= Jack V. Mackmull =

United States Army lieutenant general

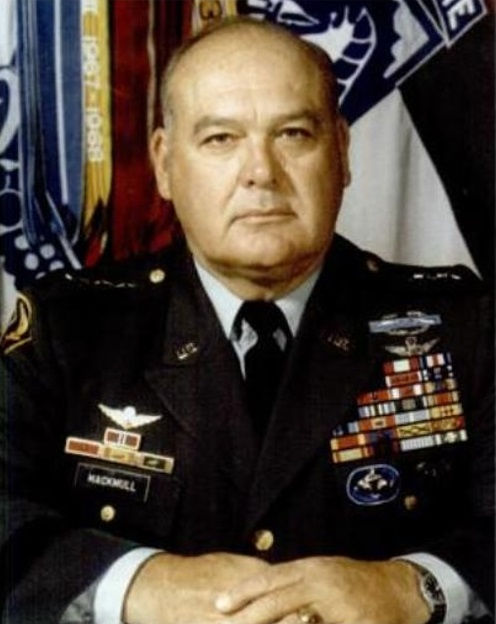
- Mackmull as commander of XVIII Airborne Corps, 1981
- Born: December 1, 1927; Dayton, Ohio, U.S.
- Died: April 3, 2011 (aged 83); Melbourne, Florida, U.S.
- Burial place: West Point Cemetery, West Point, New York, U.S.
- Education: United States Military Academy; United States Army Command and General Staff College; Armed Forces Staff College; United States Army War College
- Spouse: Beverly Marie Boehm (m. 1950)
- Children: 3
- Military career
- Allegiance: United States
- Branch: United States Army
- Service years: 1950–1984
- Rank: Lieutenant General
- Service number: 062677
- Commands: XVIII Airborne Corps; 101st Airborne Division; John F. Kennedy Special Warfare Center and School; 1st Aviation Brigade; 164th Combat Aviation Group; 13th Combat Aviation Battalion
- Conflicts: Korean War; Vietnam War
- Awards: Army Distinguished Service Medal; Silver Star; Legion of Merit (4); Distinguished Flying Cross (4); Bronze Star Medal (2)
- Other work: President, Mackmull Associates; Vice President, Army Aviation Association of America

Jack V. Mackmull (December 1, 1927 – April 3, 2011) was a career officer in the United States Army. A veteran of the Korean War and Vietnam War, he served from 1950 to 1984 and attained the rank of lieutenant general. Mackmull's commands included the John F. Kennedy Special Warfare Center and School, 101st Airborne Division, and XVIII Airborne Corps, and he was a recipient of the Army Distinguished Service Medal, Silver Star, Legion of Merit (4), and Distinguished Flying Cross (4).

A native of Dayton, Ohio, Mackmull was educated in Dayton and attended the city's Roosevelt High School. He graduated from the United States Military Academy in 1950, and was commissioned as a second lieutenant of Infantry. After initial service at posts including Alaska, in 1953, Mackmull was assigned to Korean War duty as commander of Company L, 27th Infantry Regiment and assistant operations officer (S-3) of the 27th Infantry's 3rd Battalion. Subsequent assignments included the faculty of the United States Army Command and General Staff College.

Mackmull served three tours in South Vietnam during the Vietnam War, first commanding the 13th Combat Aviation Battalion in 1964. During his second tour from 1968 to 1969, Mackmull commanded the 164th Combat Aviation Group. In 1972, Mackmull returned to South Vietnam as commander of the 1st Aviation Brigade. During this assignment, he was commended for managing the drawdown of 15,000 soldiers and over 1,000 aircraft without halting ongoing aviation operations. From 1977 to 1980, Mackmull commanded the John F. Kennedy Special Warfare Center and School.

From 1980 to 1981, Mackmull commanded the 101st Airborne Division. From 1981 to 1983, he commanded the XVIII Airborne Corps. In 1982, Mackmull led the committee that determined the army's future helicopter requirements, including an air-to-air combat capability. His efforts led to the establishment of the Army Aviation Branch, for which the army Chief of Staff, Forces Command commander, and Training and Doctrine Command commander dubbed him "Mr. Aviation". After retiring in 1984, Mackmull was a consultant to the army on Special Forces and aviation doctrine and training, a vice president of the Army Aviation Association of America, and was inducted into the Army Aviation Hall of Fame. He died in Melbourne, Florida on April 3, 2011, and was buried at West Point Cemetery.

== Early life ==
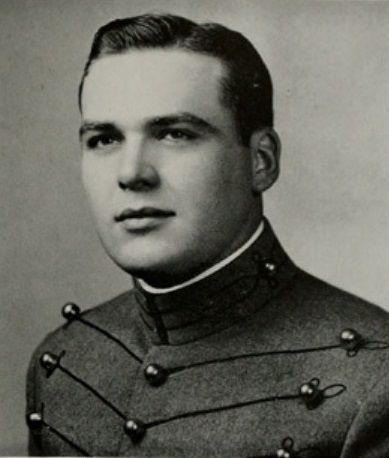
Mackmull as a West Point senior, 1950

Jack Vincent Mackmull was born in Dayton, Ohio, on December 1, 1927, the son of Milford F. and Olivia Ann (Mast) Mackmull. He was educated in Dayton, and graduated from Roosevelt High School in 1946. While at Roosevelt, Mackmull joined the National Honor Society, played football, basketball, and baseball, and was considered one of Ohio's most prominent high school athletes.

Mackmull's athletic prowess resulted in numerous college scholarship offers, as well as offers to play baseball professionally, which he declined in favor of attending the United States Military Academy (West Point). While at West Point, Mackmull played football, baseball, and basketball, and was a member of the track and field team. He graduated in 1950 ranked 565 of 670, and was commissioned as a second lieutenant of Infantry.

== Military education ==
Mackmull's professional training included:

- Infantry Officer Basic Course
- Infantry Officer Advanced Course
- Ranger School
- Airborne School
- Air Assault School
- Army Fixed-Wing Aviation School (Camp Gary, Texas)
- Army Helicopter Aviation School (Fort Wolters, Texas and Fort Rucker, Alabama)

His professional education included:

- United States Army Command and General Staff College (1961)
- Armed Forces Staff College (1966)
- United States Army War College (1968)

In addition to his professional education and training, after graduating from the War College, Mackmull attended the army's Management Program for Executives at the University of Pittsburgh. He also took graduate courses in management and business administration at George Washington University.

== Start of career ==
After receiving his commission, Mackmull was assigned to Company G, 4th Regimental Combat Team (RCT), a unit of the 2nd Infantry Division then based at Fort Lewis, Washington. He was soon assigned to Fort Richardson, Alaska, where he remained for two years as a platoon leader in different 4th RCT companies, then commanded the RCT's L Company. After attending the Infantry Officer Basic Course at Fort Benning, Georgia as a first lieutenant in 1952, he remained at Fort Benning as a member of the faculty at the Armed Forces Physical Training School for six months.

Mackmull volunteered for Korean War service and in February 1953 was assigned to the 27th Infantry Regiment, in which he served as commander of Company L. In June 1953, he was assigned as assistant operations officer (Assistant S-3) of the regiment's 3rd Battalion, and he remained with the regiment when it was reassigned to Schofield Barracks, Hawaii in July 1953. After arriving in Hawaii, he was assigned as the battalion S-3. Mackmull was subsequently promoted to captain and assigned as assistant S-3 of the 27th Regiment. Due to the absence of his superior, Mackmull frequently served as acting S-3.

== Continued career ==
After completing his fixed-wing aviation training, in 1960 Mackmull was promoted to major and selected for attendance at the United States Army Command and General Staff College. After graduating in 1961, he was assigned to the school's faculty. In 1964, Mackmull was promoted to lieutenant colonel and assigned to duty in South Vietnam as commander of the 13th Combat Aviation Battalion. After organizing the battalion and leading it overseas, he was replaced and assigned to temporary duty as a staff officer with the Army Concept Team in Vietnam, for which he documented the use of helicopters in the war and made recommendations for equipment procurement and fielding, as well as personnel training. Mackmull subsequently rotated back into command of the 13th CAB. While he was in command, the battalion flew UH-1B transports and gunships, and its three companies — the 114th at Vĩnh Long Airfield, 121st at Sóc Trăng Airfield, Company A, 502nd Aviation Battalion at Vĩnh Long, and the battalion headquarters at Cần Thơ Base Camp — supported Army of the Republic of Vietnam forces in the Mekong Delta.

After leaving Vietnam, Mackmull attended the Armed Forces Staff College. He was then assigned as chief of the army's Aviation Warrant Officer Branch. In this posting, Mackmull managed the branch's expansion as U.S. involvement in the Vietnam War began to widen. As part of this assignment, he observed that Aviation Warrant Officers had no definite career path, and wrote the plan that evolved into the army's formal Aviation Warrant Officer Program.

In December 1968, Mackmull was again assigned to Vietnam, this time as commander of the 164th Combat Aviation Group at Cần Thơ Base Camp. In this assignment, he was responsible for all aviation in the Mekong Delta at the height of wartime combat, and was commended for effectively integrating air cavalry, airmobile, attack helicopters, and aviation logistics in all operations. In June 1969, he was assigned as chief of staff of Delta Military Assistance Command, the U.S. command and control headquarters for units in the Mekong Delta, and senior advisor for the 44th Special Tactical Zone, the South Vietnamese command formed to prevent North Vietnamese infiltration via Cambodia.

== Later career ==
From 1970 to 1972, Mackmull was assigned to the office of the army's Assistant Chief of Staff for Force Development as head of the Organization and Unit Training Directorate's Unit Authorizations Division. In this role, he oversaw the army's efforts to improve automated systems that accounted for unit personnel, equipment, vehicles and weapons. From June 1972 to March 1973, Mackmull served in Vietnam for the third time, this time as commander of the 1st Aviation Brigade. As U.S. forces were withdrawing, Mackmull managed the drawdown of aviation units and equipment — 15,000 soldiers and over 1,000 aircraft — with no pause in combat aviation operations. He was promoted to brigadier general in February 1973.

In May 1973, Mackmull was assigned as deputy commander of the Army Aviation Systems Command at Granite City Army Depot in St Louis, Missouri. During this posting, he had responsibility for centralizing and automating the army's aviation logistics systems. In May 1974, Mackmull was assigned as assistant division commander (ADC) of the 101st Airborne Division, and he served until May 1976. As ADC, he oversaw design and implementation of the army's Combat Aviation Management System, multiple field manuals on air assault operations, and aviation battle drills. From May 1976 to June 1977, Mackmull was chief of staff for the XVIII Airborne Corps.

In June 1977, Mackmull was assigned as commander of the John F. Kennedy Special Warfare Center and School, and he was promoted to major general in July. As head of Special Forces, Mackmull led post-Vietnam War modernization of equipment, doctrine, tactics, and command relationships. and oversaw organization of Delta Force and Special Operations aviation doctrine and tactics. Mackmull commanded the 101st Airborne Division from June to 1980 to August 1981, and his accomplishments in this position included organizing Task Force 160, now the 160th Special Operations Aviation Regiment (Airborne). The 160th Aviation Regiment supports Special Operations by helicopter attack, assault, and reconnaissance, frequently on short notice, at night, and at high speed and low altitude.

In August 1981, Mackmull was assigned as commander of the XVIII Airborne Corps, and he was promoted to lieutenant general in September. In 1982, he participated in the Army Aviation Review study project as chairman of the Tactical Employment Committee. The committee's report and recommendations led to recognition of a future requirement for a helicopter that could engage in air-to-air combat and the 1983 establishment of the Army Aviation Branch. In addition, Mackmull oversaw the training for, planning, and execution of the army's participation in the United States invasion of Grenada. Mackmull retired in June 1984.

== Retirement and death ==
In retirement, Mackmull was a resident of first Mount Pleasant, South Carolina, and later Melbourne, Florida. For several years, he provided advice and guidance on Special Operations and aviation to the army as president of the Mackmull Associates consulting firm. In 1988, he was named honorary colonel of the newly activated 160th Special Operations Aviation Regiment (Airborne) to acknowledge his role in the development of Special Forces aviation. He was also active in the Army Aviation Association of America, including a term as one of the organization's vice presidents. In addition, Mackmull was inducted into the Army Aviation Hall of Fame.

After moving to Melbourne, Mackmull resided at the Indian River Colony Club (IRCC) retirement community. While serving on the community's board of directors, he served as vice chairman of the budget and finance committee and managed the development and installation of a fitness center. Mackmull died in Melbourne on April 3, 2011. He was buried at West Point Cemetery.

== Awards ==
Mackmull's major awards and decorations included:

- Army Distinguished Service Medal
- Silver Star
- Legion of Merit with three oak leaf clusters
- Distinguished Flying Cross with three oak leaf clusters
- Bronze Star Medal with oak leaf cluster
- Meritorious Service Medal
- Air Medal with numeral 35
- Army Commendation Medal with oak leaf cluster
- Combat Infantryman Badge
- Master Parachutist Badge
- Master Aviator Badge
- Air Assault Badge

== Family ==
In June 1950, Mackmull married Beverly Marie Boehm, whom he had known since high school. They were married until his death and were the parents of three children, Jack Jr., Stephen Jeffery, and Kimberly Ann.
