= 164th Aviation Group =

- Active: 20 December 1967 – 13 March 1973
- Country: United States
- Branch: United States Army
- Part of: 1st Aviation Brigade
- Garrison/HQ: Cần Thơ Base Camp, Vietnam
- Officially formed: 1 February 1968

Commanders
- Notable commanders: COL McDaniel, Robert D (1968)

The 164th Aviation Group is a former group of the United States Army that was operational during the Vietnam War as part of the 1st Aviation Brigade.

It was constituted "20 December 1967 in the Regular Army as Headquarters and Headquarters Company, 164th Aviation Group, and activated in Vietnam."

It was officially formed on 1 February 1968.

== Structure ==
- 18th Corps Aviation Company (1971-73)
- 163rd General Support Company (1968-72)
- 478th Heavy Helicopter Company (1970-71)
- Troop D, 3rd Squadron, 5th Cavalry (1971)
- Troop C, 16th Cavalry (1972-73)
- 7th Squadron, 1st Cavalry Regiment (1968-72) at Vĩnh Long Airfield
  - HQ Troop
  - A Air Cavalry Troop (1968-72)
  - B Air Cavalry Troop (1968-72)
  - C Air Cavalry Troop (1968-72)
  - D Ground Troop (1968-72)
- 13th Combat Aviation Battalion (1964-72) at Cần Thơ Base Camp & Sóc Trăng Airfield
  - 73rd Surveillance Airplane Company (1971)
  - 114th Assault Helicopter Company (1964-69) with the Bell UH-1B Iroquois (Huey)
  - 121st Assault Helicopter Company (1964-70) with the UH-1B Huey
  - 134th Fixed Wing Transport Company (1965-67)
  - 147th Assault Helicopter Company (1971-72)
  - 162nd Assault Helicopter Company (1969-72)
  - 175th Assault Helicopter Company (1966-69) with the UH-1 Huey
  - 191st Assault Helicopter Company (1969-71)
  - 199th Surveillance Airplane Company (1967)
  - 221st Surveillance Airplane Company (1965-67)
  - 221st Surveillance Airplane Company (1968-71)
  - 235th Assault Helicopter Company (1971)
  - 244th Surveillance Airplane Company (1967)
  - 271st Medium Helicopter Company (1968)
  - 271st Assault Support Helicopter Company (1971) with the Boeing CH-47A Chinook
  - 336th Assault Helicopter Company (1966-71) with the UH-1 Huey
  - Company A, 101st Aviation Battalion (1965)
  - Company A, 502nd Aviation Battalion (1964-66)
  - Troop C, 16th Cavalry Regiment (1970-71)
- 214th Aviation Battalion (1969-71) at Vĩnh Long Airfield
  - 114th Assault Helicopter Company (1969-71)
  - 135th Assault Helicopter Company (1969-71)
  - 175th Assault Helicopter Company (1969-71)
  - 199th Reconnaissance Airplane Company (1969-70)
  - 221st Reconnaissance Airplane Company (1971)
  - 335th Assault Helicopter Company (1969-71)
- 307th Combat Aviation Battalion (1967-71) at Cần Thơ Base Camp
  - 73rd Surveillance Airplane Company (1970-71)
  - 147th Assault Helicopter Company (1969-71)
  - 199th Reconnaissance Airplane Company (1967-69)
  - 221st Reconnaissance Airplane Company (1967-68)
  - 235th Assault Helicopter Company (1967-71)
  - 244th Surveillance Airplane Company (1967-70)
  - 271st Assault Support Helicopter Company (1968-71)

The group HHC was inactivated on 14 March 1973 at Oakland, California.

Redesignated 16 October 1995 as Headquarters and Headquarters Detachment, 164th Aviation Group, and activated in Korea.

== See also ==
- 1st Cavalry Division (United States)
- List of aviation companies of the United States Army
