= William J. Maddox Jr =

United States Army general

William J. Maddox, Jr
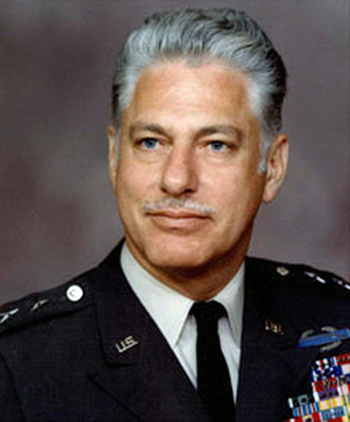
- Maj Gen. William J. Maddox Jr.
- Born: May 22, 1921; Newburgh, New York, US
- Died: January 5, 2001 (aged 79); Bedford, Texas, US
- Burial place: Arlington National Cemetery
- Relatives: Jaye Maddox (wife)
- Military career
- Allegiance: United States of America
- Branch: United States Army
- Service years: 1943–1976
- Rank: Major General
- Nickname: 'Grey Ghost'
- Commands: Platoon, 122nd Cavalry Reconnaissance Troop; Platoon, Company H, 8th Cavalry Regiment; Flight Detachment, Commander of the Military Assistance and Advisory Group in Japan; 13th Aviation Battalion; Detachment, IV Corps Advisor Group; 3rd Brigade, 25th Infantry Division; 164th Aviation Group; United States Army Aviation School; United States Army Aviation Center
- Conflicts: World War II; Korean War; Vietnam War
- Awards: Army Distinguished Service Medal; Silver Star (4); Legion of Merit (5); Distinguished Flying Cross (8); Soldier's Medal; Bronze Star (4); Purple Heart (4); Air Medal (127)

William J. Maddox Jr (May 22, 1921 – January 5, 2001) was a United States Army Aviator and a major general in the United States Army. During his career he amassed over 10,500 flying hours, almost 4,000 of those in combat over Korea, Vietnam and Cambodia.

He served three tours in Vietnam. In 1976, he commanded the United States Army Aviation Center. Maddox was instrumental in identifying the need for air mobility, developing a management structure that ensured the Army met its aviation objectives. Maddox is one of army's most highly decorated aviators.

== Biography ==
Maddox was born on May 22, 1921, in Newburgh, New York. He was a graduate of Wilson High School in Washington D.C. and Michigan State University. He received a master's degree in international relations from George Washington University. Maddox was married to Jaye Maddox (née Kurusu), the daughter of Japanese diplomat Saburo Kurusu. They had one son and daughter. Jaye Maddox died in 1999.

After his retirement from the Army, he served as Advisor to King Hussein of Jordan and served as the commandant of Jordanian Aviation Academy. He later served as managing director of Arabian Helicopters in Saudi Arabia, and as managing director of Bell Helicopters in Asia.

Maddox died on January 5, 2001, due to sepsis at a hospital in Bedford, Texas. He is buried at Arlington National Cemetery.

== Awards and decorations ==
Maddox is one of the most decorated Army Aviators. His awards include:

Combat Infantryman Badge
Army Master Aviator Badge
Army Distinguished Service Medal	Silver Star with 3 bronze oak leaf clusters	
Legion of Merit with 4 bronze oak leaf clusters	Distinguished Flying Cross with 1 silver and 2 bronze oak leaf clusters	Soldier's Medal
Bronze Star with Combat V and 3 bronze oak leaf clusters	Purple Heart with 3 bronze oak leaf clusters	Air Medal with Combat V and award numeral 127
Army Commendation Medal with Combat V and 2 bronze oak leaf clusters	Army Good Conduct Medal	American Campaign Medal
Asiatic-Pacific Campaign Medal	World War II Victory Medal	Army of Occupation Medal
National Defense Service Medal with 1 bronze service star	Korean Service Medal with Arrowhead and 3 bronze campaign stars	Vietnam Service Medal with 1 silver and 3 bronze campaign stars
Korean Defense Service Medal	Armed Forces Reserve Medal	Order of National Security Merit; Cheon-Su Medal (Korea)
National Order of Vietnam (Knight)	Vietnam Army Distinguished Service Order (2nd Class)	Vietnam Cross of Gallantry with 3 Palms and 2 Silver Stars
United Nations Korea Medal	Vietnam Campaign Medal	Republic of Korea War Service Medal

Army Presidential Unit Citation		Republic of Korea Presidential Unit Citation
Vietnam Presidential Unit Citation	Republic of Vietnam Gallantry Cross Unit Citation	Republic of Vietnam Civil Actions Unit Citation

== See also ==
- Army aviation
