= James C. Smith (general) =

American Army general

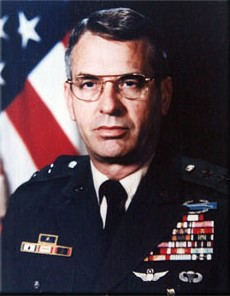
- Born: 5 September 1923; Georgia, U.S.
- Died: 14 December 2016 (aged 93); Lawrenceville, Georgia
- Military career
- Allegiance: United States
- Branch: United States Army
- Service years: 1942–1981
- Rank: Major General
- Nickname: Jim
- Commands: United States Army Aviation Center; 1st Cavalry Division; 1st Armored Division; 1st Brigade, 1st Cavalry Division; 1st Squadron, 9th Cavalry Regiment; Support Command, 1st Cavalry Division
- Conflicts: World War II; Korean War; Vietnam War
- Awards: Distinguished Service Medal; Silver Star Medal (2); Legion of Merit; Distinguished Flying Cross; Bronze Star Medal (2); Purple Heart; Air Medal

James Cliffton Smith Jr. (5 September 1923 – 14 December 2016) was a major general in the United States Army who served as commander of the United States Army Aviation Center and commandant of the Army Aviation School from 1976 to 1978. He previously served as commanding general of the 1st Cavalry Division from 1971 to 1973.

== Early life and education ==
Smith was born in Georgia, where his father was a sergeant major in the 6th Cavalry Regiment at Fort Oglethorpe. When he enlisted in the Army on 30 June 1942, a review board waived basic training and instead sent him to officer candidate school at Fort Riley. Smith completed fixed-wing flight training for artillery observation at Fort Sill in November 1946. He later received helicopter flight training and, in 1961, completed a Bachelor of General Studies degree in military science at the University of Omaha. Smith graduated from the Army Command and General Staff College in 1957 and the Army War College.

== Military career ==
During World War II, Smith was sent to Europe after being commissioned as a second lieutenant of cavalry on 14 January 1943. While serving as a platoon leader, he was shot several times by a German sniper. Smith was awarded the Silver Star Medal and a Purple Heart. He also saw combat duty during the Korean War, receiving two Bronze Star Medals.

On his first combat tour during the Vietnam War, Smith in turn commanded the Support Command, 1st Cavalry Division; the 1st Squadron, 9th Cavalry, 1st Cavalry Division; and the 1st Brigade (Airborne), 1st Cavalry Division. On his second tour, he served as deputy commander of the 1st Aviation Brigade and then as assistant commander of the 101st Airborne Division. He was awarded a second Silver Star Medal, a Distinguished Flying Cross, and an Air Medal.

After briefly serving as commander of the 1st Armored Division in 1971, Smith assumed command of the 1st Cavalry Division on 5 May 1971 at Fort Hood after the division returned to the United States from Vietnam. He relinquished command in January 1973. Smith later served as commander of the Army Aviation Center and Fort Rucker from July 1976 to December 1978.

His final assignment was as director of training in the Office of the Deputy Chief of Staff for Operations and Plans in the Department of the Army at the Pentagon. Smith retired from active duty on 28 February 1981 after almost thirty-nine years of military service.

== Personal ==
Smith was married to Doris Smith for sixty-six years. The couple had seven children and twelve grandchildren.

After his death in Lawrenceville, Georgia, Smith was interred at Arlington National Cemetery on 27 September 2017.
