= George P. Seneff Jr. =

United States Army general (1916–1998)

George Philip Seneff Jr.
- Born: August 27, 1916; Chicago, Illinois
- Died: December 2, 1998 (aged 82); Honolulu, Hawaii
- Burial place: National Memorial Cemetery of the Pacific
- Military career
- Allegiance: United States
- Branch: US Army
- Service years: 1936–1975
- Rank: Lieutenant general
- Commands: 1st Aviation Brigade; 3rd Infantry Division; III Corps; Fifth Army
- Conflicts: World War II; Vietnam War
- Awards: Distinguished Service Medal; Legion of Merit (3)

George Philip Steneff Jr. (27 August 1916 – 2 December 1998) was a United States Army Lieutenant general who served in World War II and the Vietnam War.

== Military career ==
He attended West Point graduating in the class of 1941.

During World War II he served as an artillery officer in the 14th Armored Division.

After World War II he returned to West Point where he served as a Tactical Officer from 1946 to 1948. He then served in the Armored Branch until 1950, during which time he graduated from the Army Language School and Strategic Intelligence School. He served as assistant Army attaché in London until 1953. He then served with the 82nd Reconnaissance Battalion, 2nd Armored Division, part of U.S. Army, Europe until 1955.

In 1956, he graduated from the Army Aviation School. He graduated from the National War College in 1960 and was then assigned to the U.S. delegation to NATO. In February 1963 he was appointed commanding officer of the 11th Air Assault Aviation Group and the Division Aviation Officer of the 11th Air Assault Division (Test) on the unit's activation.

In March 1966 he was appointed as commanding general, 1st Aviation Brigade, in South Vietnam. He was quick to assemble many of his former 11th Air Assault team to form a brigade staff and to publish the first handbook and standard operating procedures of the brigade. With the publication of basic operational manuals, the 1st Brigade was able to standardize aviation operational procedures throughout Vietnam, establish training schools, enforce safety regulations, and in general more effectively manage the growing aviation assets. Essentially Seneff commanded the non-organic Army aviation elements in Vietnam, but operational control was vested in the supported ground commander. In coordination with Major general William E. DePuy who then commanded the 1st Infantry Division, Seneff began a test period to determine the most satisfactory means of supporting a line infantry division with separate aviation elements. While considerable work had been done in this area during 1965, it had grown in different directions depending on the unit supported and the aviation assets available. Using the 11th Combat Aviation Battalion as the test vehicle, DePuy and Seneff soon ironed out most of the serious problems in matching aviation to the ground units. On 4 September 1967, four days after the arrival of the first Bell AH-1 Cobras in Vietnam, a Cobra piloted by Seneff made the type's first combat kill, sinking a sampan and killing four Vietcong near Muc Hoa. On 16 September 1967 Seneff passed command of the Brigade to Major general Robert R. Williams.

In October 1967 he was appointed commander of the 3rd Infantry Division in West Germany. From March 1969 he served as operations officer at United States Strike Command and as deputy director of Modern Army Selected Systems Test Evaluation and Review project ("Project MASSTER"). In July 1971 he was appointed commanding general of III Corps. In October 1973 he was appointed commanding general of Fifth Army.

== Later life ==
He died of Alzheimer's Disease on 2 December 1998 in Honolulu, Hawaii. He was buried at the National Memorial Cemetery of the Pacific.
