= Delk M. Oden =

United States Army general (1911–1997)

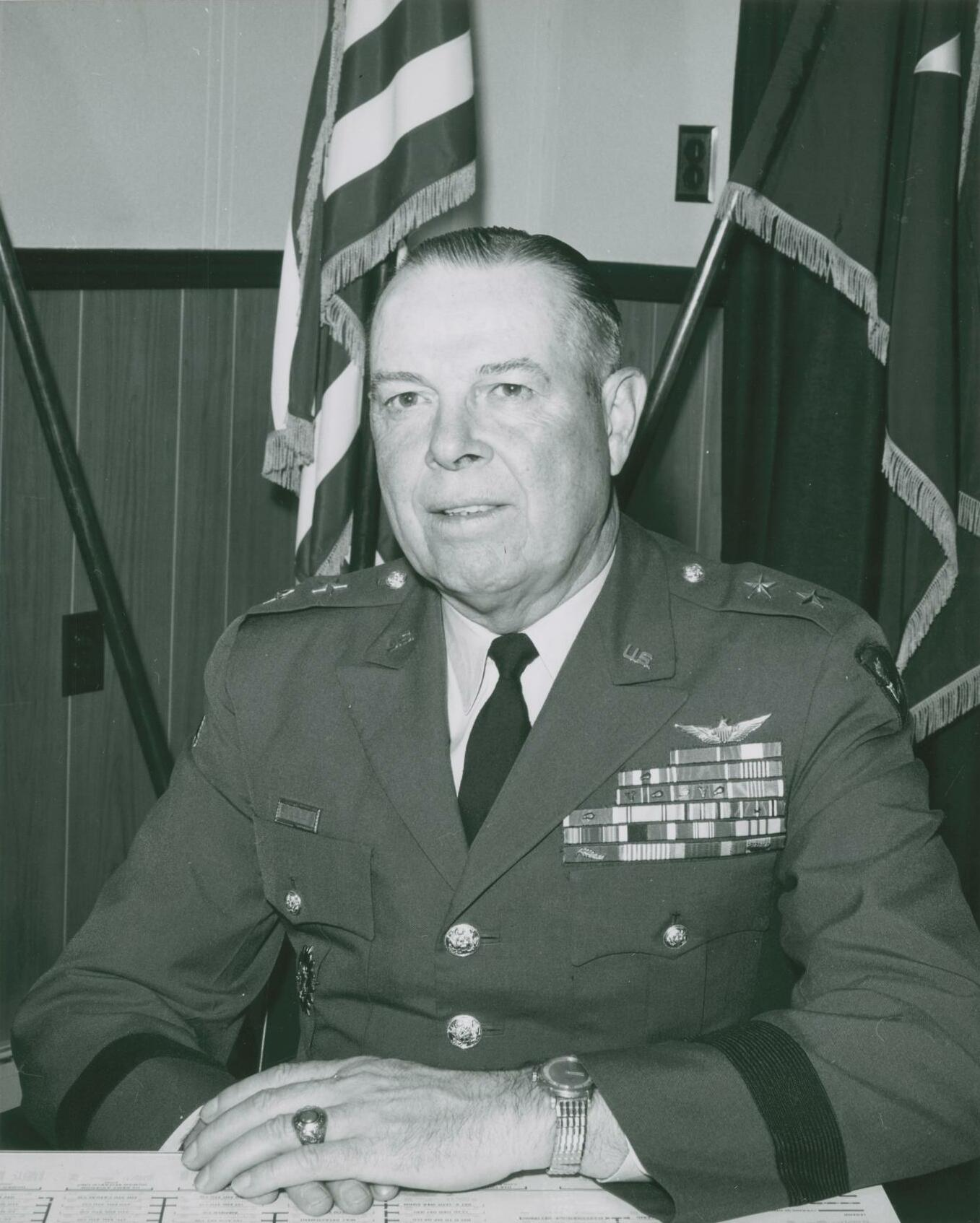
- Born: 13 July 1911; Gordon, Texas, United States
- Died: 13 June 1997 (aged 85); Fort Belvoir, Virginia, United States
- Burial place: Arlington National Cemetery, Virginia, United States
- Military career
- Allegiance: United States
- Branch: United States Army
- Service years: 1930–1932; 1937–1970
- Rank: Major general
- Commands: U.S. Army Aviation Center; U.S. Army Support Command, Vietnam; 35th Tank Battalion; 704th Tank Destroyer Battalion
- Conflicts: World War II; Vietnam War
- Awards: Distinguished Service Cross; Distinguished Service Medal (2); Silver Star (2); Legion of Merit; Soldier's Medal; Bronze Star (2); Purple Heart (2); Croix de Guerre (2)

Signature
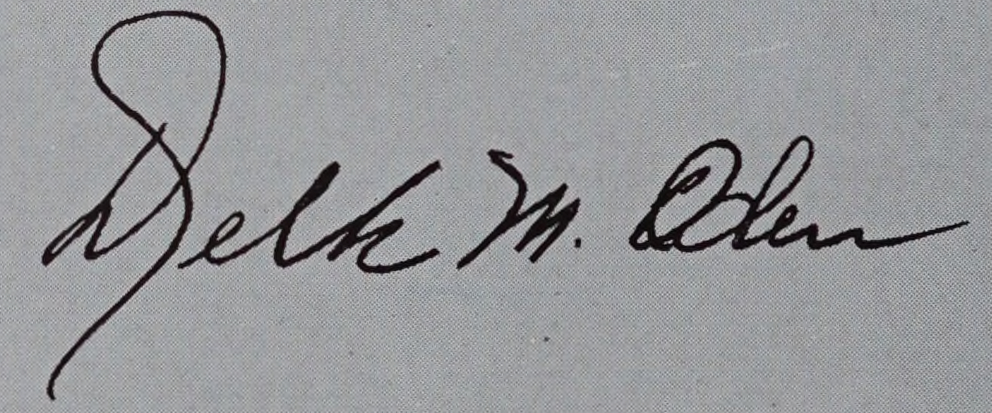

Delk McCorkle Oden (13 July 1911 – 13 June 1997) was a major general in the United States Army who served during World War II and the Vietnam War.

== Early life ==
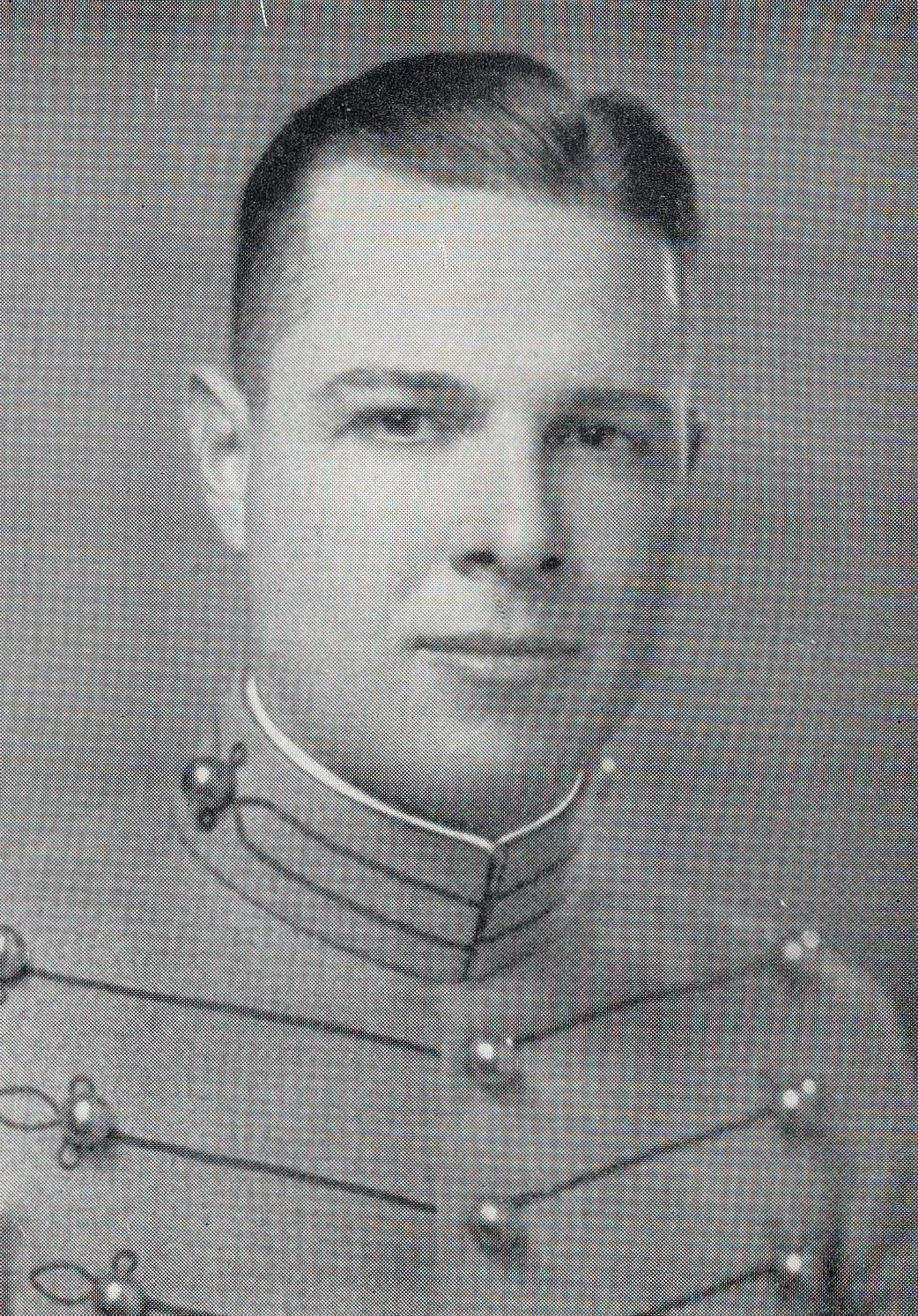
Oden as a United States Military Academy cadet c. 1937

Oden was born in Gordon, Texas. He enlisted in the Army on 1 July 1930. Oden attended Marion Military Institute.

== Military career ==
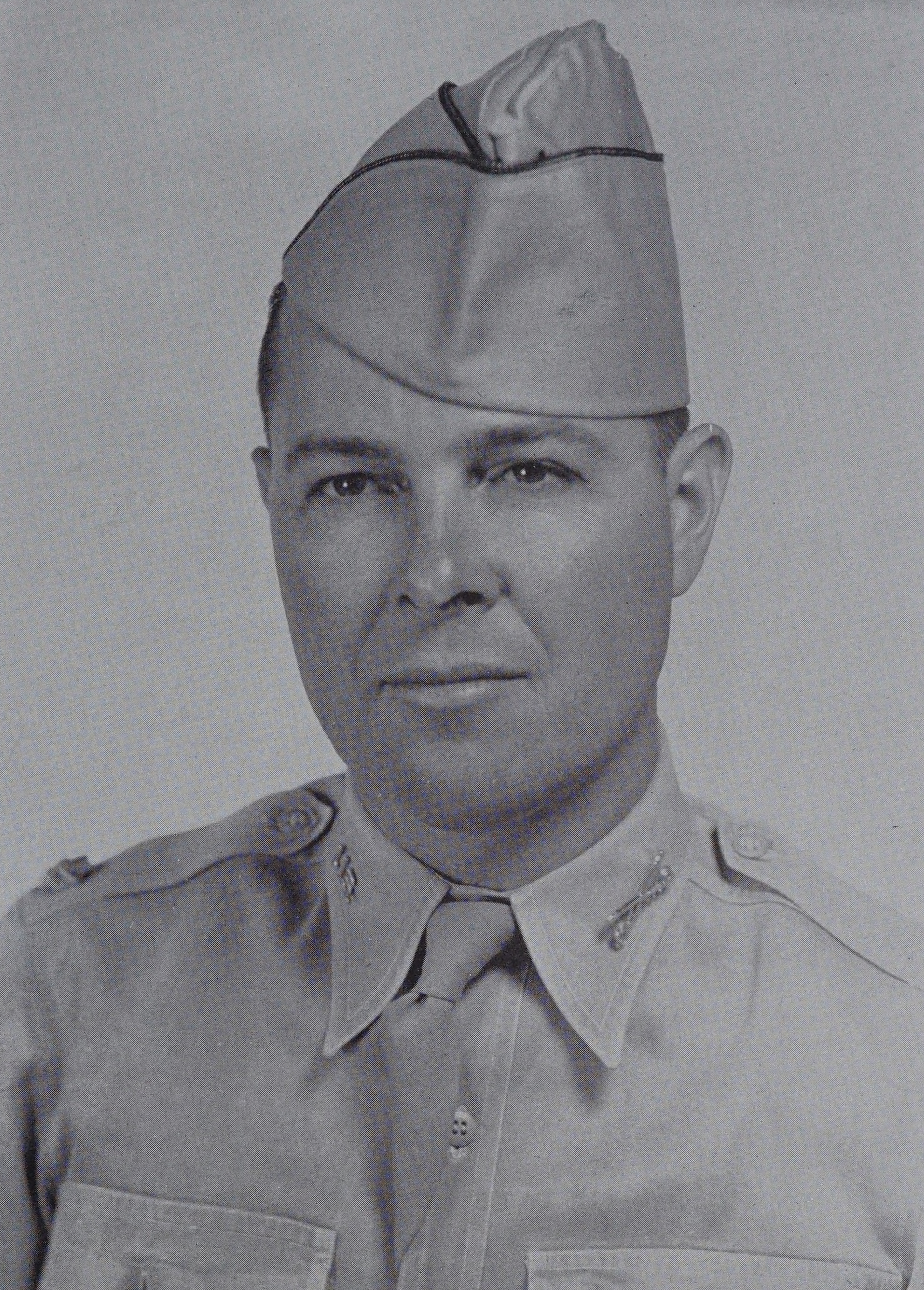
Oden as Commanding Officer of the 704th Tank Destroyer Battalion c. 1942

Appointed to the United States Military Academy, he graduated with a B.S. degree in 1937 and was commissioned as a second lieutenant of infantry assigned to the 27th Infantry Regiment in Hawaii.

Oden returned to the continental United States in November 1939 and then served in the 7th and 10th Cavalry Regiments. He was promoted to first lieutenant on 12 June 1940 and captain on 9 September 1940.

In January 1942 he transferred to the 84th Armored Reconnaissance Battalion of the 4th Armored Division. Following promotion to major on 1 February 1942, he took command of the 704th Tank Destroyer Battalion in July 1942. He was promoted to lieutenant colonel on 21 January 1943 and his unit was responsible for testing the M18 Hellcat tank destroyer, still attached to the 4th Armored Division.

The 4th Armored Division began unloading at Normandy on 9 July. On 15 August he led Task Force Oden comprising the 704th and the 10th Armored Infantry Battalion and the 66th Armored Field Artillery Battalion as part of the attack on Orléans and with other 4th Division units they liberated the city by 16 August. In August 1944, Delk was reassigned to command the 35th Tank Battalion, also part of the 4th Armored Division. During the Battle of the Bulge the 35th Tank Battalion was part of Combat Command A which was split into two task forces with Oden commanding another Task Force Oden which advanced towards Bastogne from Wolwelange along the Bastogne-Arlon highway. On 28 March 1945, while leading the 35th Tank Battalion in combat near Guissen, Germany, he would be involved in actions leading to the award of the Distinguished Service Cross.

From October 1945 to March 1946 he served as Chief of Staff of the 4th Armored Division. He returned to the U.S. and served as Plans officer on the General Staff at the Pentagon from April to August 1946. He attended the Command and General Staff College at Fort Leavenworth from August 1946 to June 1947. He served as Plans officer at the Pentagon again from December 1947 to August 1949. He attended the Armed Forces Staff College at Norfolk, Virginia from September 1949 to January 1950.

In February 1950 he was assigned to Turkey, serving first as director of instruction at the Turkish Armored School until June 1950 and then as chief of staff of the U.S. military aid mission until June 1952. He was promoted to colonel on 29 June 1951. He returned to the U.S. and attended the Army War College from July 1952 to June 1953. He was then assigned to Austria serving as Chief of Staff U.S. Forces from July 1953 to August 1955 and then as Army attaché until October 1956. He returned to the U.S. and served on the Regular Army Augmentation Board from January to July 1957 and then attended the Army Aviation School at Fort Rucker from September to December 1957. He commanded Combat Command A, 1st Armored Division from December 1957 to May 1959. He then served as assistant commandant of the Army Aviation School at Fort Rucker until June 1961. From June to October 1961 he served as a member of the Hoelscher Committee on reorganisation of the Department of the Army. He was promoted to brigadier general on 22 August 1961. He then served as director of army aviation at the Pentagon from October 1961 to May 1963, and during this time he served on the Howze Board.

In May 1963 he was assigned to South Vietnam as Chief of the Army section of Military Assistance Advisory Group, Vietnam. In May 1964 he was appointed Commanding General, U.S. Army Support Command, Vietnam and served in that role until March 1965.

He returned to the U.S. and served as Director of Officer Personnel of the Army at the Pentagon from April 1965. He served as Commanding General, U.S. Army Aviation Center, Fort Rucker from March 1967 to September 1970. He retired from the Army on 1 October 1970 as a Major General.

== Later life ==
In 1973, he joined Bell Helicopter International and became the President and Chief Operations Officer. He left Bell in 1975, retiring in Washington D.C.

Oden died on 13 June 1997 and was buried at Arlington National Cemetery on 23 June 1997. His wife Margaret Avery Oden (4 February 1914 – 15 May 2002) was interred next to him on 4 October 2002.

== Decorations ==
His decorations included the Distinguished Service Cross, Distinguished Service Medal (2), Silver Star (2), Legion of Merit, Soldier's Medal, Bronze Star (2), Purple Heart (2) and the Croix de Guerre (2).
