= 13th Aviation Regiment =

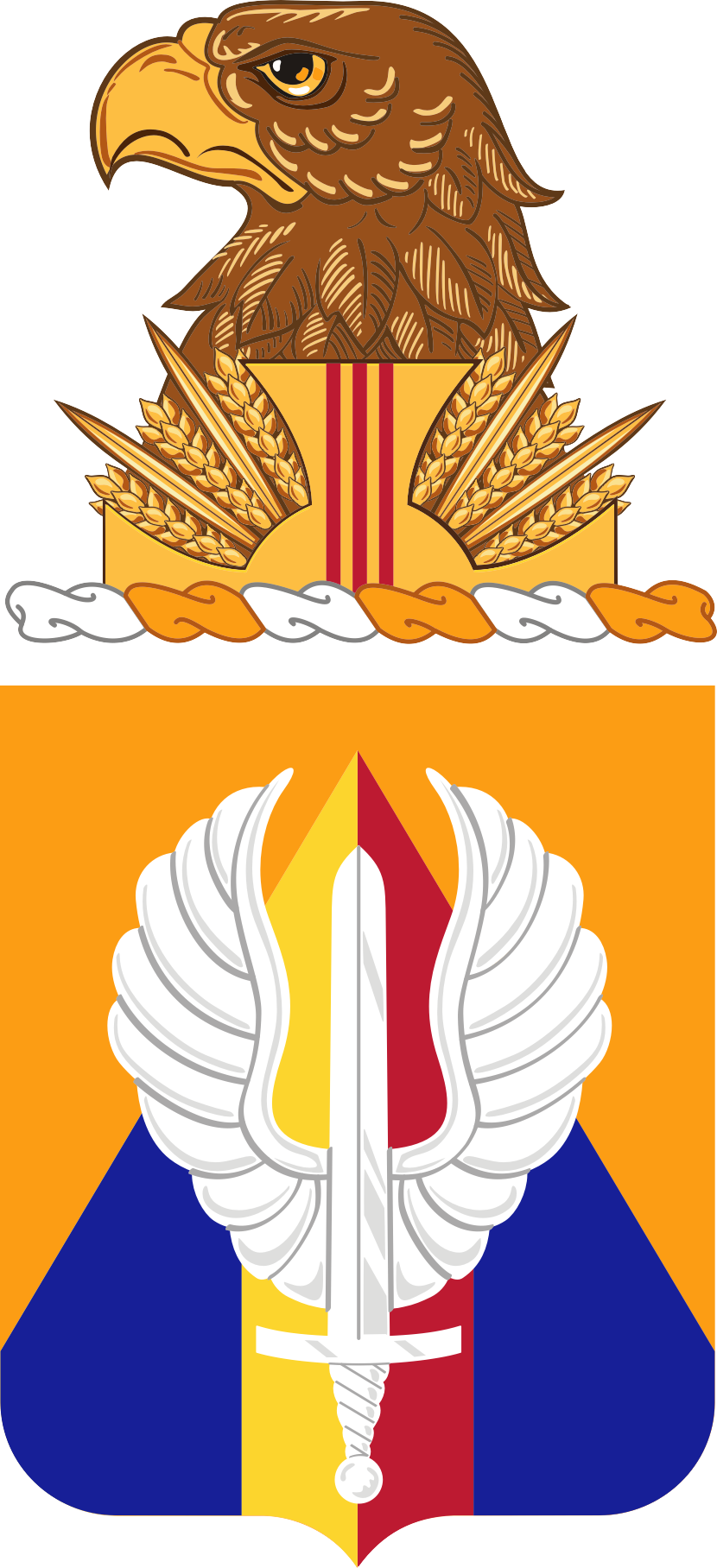
- 13th Aviation Regiment coat of arms
- Country: United States
- Branch: United States Army
- Type: Aviation
- Role: Air Traffic Controller and Aviation Operations Specialist Training
- Part of: TRADOC
- Garrison/HQ: Fort Novosel, Alabama
- Mottos: "Swift and Deadly"

Insignia
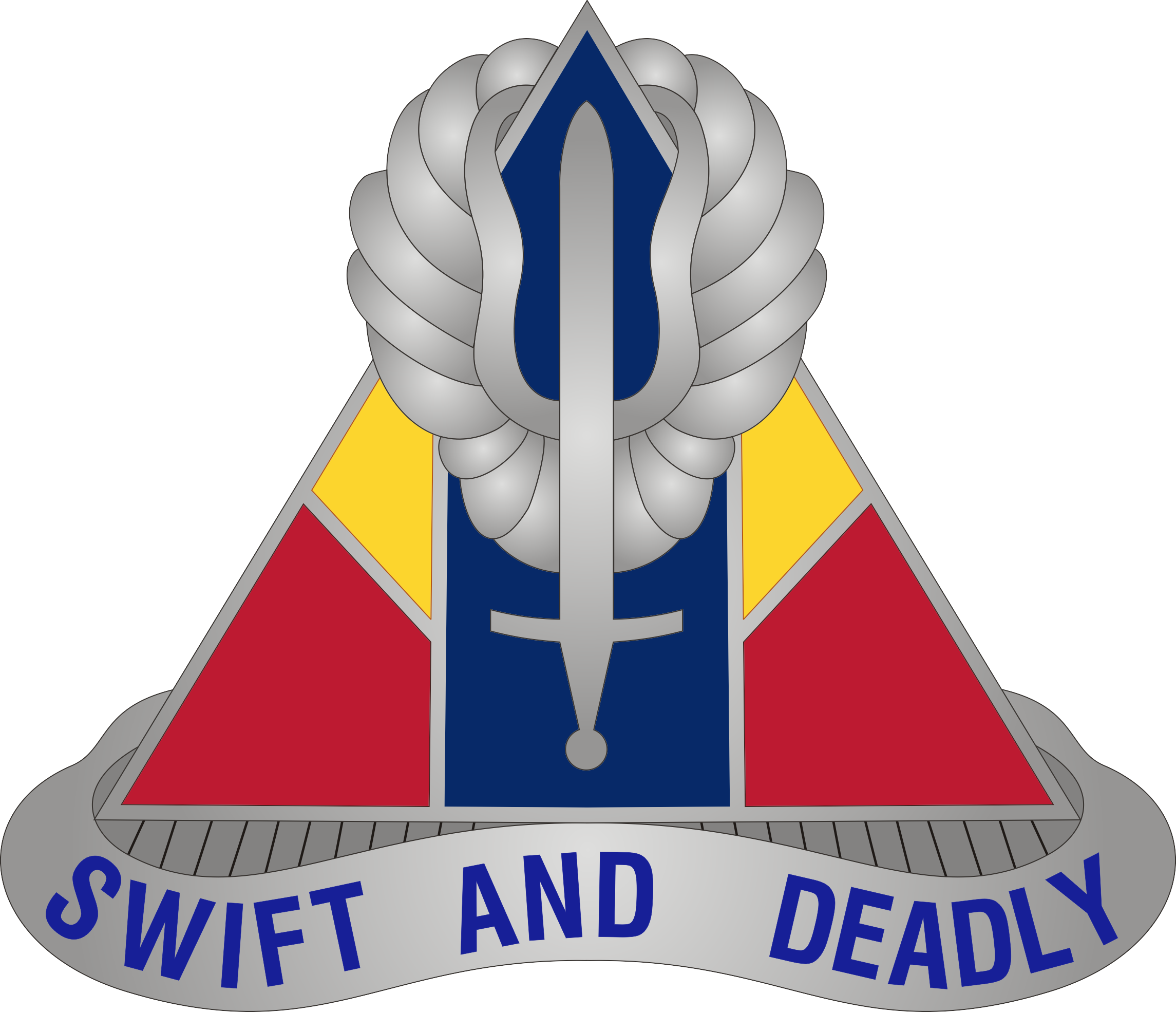
- Distinctive Unit Insignia

The 13th Aviation Regiment is a regiment of the United States Army.

== 1st Battalion, 13th Aviation ==
The 1st Battalion, 13th Aviation Regiment manages new recruits who have recently graduated basic training and who have reported to Fort Novosel to receive their military occupational specialty identifier before reporting to their first duty station. The battalion orchestrates and implements the majority of enlisted training at Fort Novosel. The 6th Military Police Detachment and an element of the 46th Engineer Battalion is also assigned to 1-13th. Fort Novosel’s military and civilian firefighters are assigned under the 6th MP Detachment.

== 2nd Battalion, 13th Aviation ==
The 2nd Battalion, 13th Aviation Regiment, which replaced the Unmanned Aircraft Systems Training Battalion (UASTB)(Provisional), is based at Fort Huachuca, Arizona. Its primary mission is to train soldiers in the operation and maintenance of a variety of Unmanned Aircraft Systems. 2–13th Aviation is a tenant unit of Fort Huachuca, but its parent unit is the 1st Aviation Brigade at Fort Novosel, Alabama, home of the United States Army Aviation Center of Excellence.

The battalion operates the largest UAS training center in the world, with over 125,000 square feet (11,600 m^{2}) of training space, four hangars, two runways, and 24-hour operational capacity. The battalion trains approximately 2,000 Soldiers, Marines, and foreign military students each year.

Formerly part of Company E, 305th Military Intelligence Battalion (E-305th MIB), the Unmanned Aircraft Systems Training Battalion (UASTB) (Provisional) was activated on 19 April 2006 during the transition of authority for UAS training from the U.S. Army Intelligence Center to the U.S. Army Aviation Warfighting Center. The UASTB was later redesignated as the 1-210th Aviation Regiment and was finally redesignated as the 2–13th Aviation Regiment on 11 June 2011.

=== Alpha Company ===
Alpha Company's soldiers train to become Military Occupational Specialty (MOS) 15W Unmanned Aircraft Systems Operators and 15E Unmanned Aircraft Systems Repairers qualified on the RQ-7B Shadow and the MQ-1C Gray Eagle Unmanned Aircraft Systems. Alpha Company's 500+ Soldiers are held to the highest standards of discipline, professionalism, and physical fitness. To help them meet these standards, Alpha Company relies on Advanced Individual Training Platoon Sergeants, all with Army Aviation backgrounds. Alpha Company also provides administrative, training, and logistical support for the battalion.

=== Bravo Company ===
Bravo Company's mission is to train UAS Operators on the remote operation of the RQ-7B Shadow and the MQ-1C Gray Eagle Unmanned Systems. Bravo Company also oversees the UAS Instructor Operator Course.

=== Charlie Company ===
Charlie Company's mission is to train UAS Repairers on the maintenance, troubleshooting, and electrical theory of the RQ-7B Shadow and the MQ-1C Gray Eagle Unmanned Systems. Charlie Company also oversees the Tactical UAS Warrant Officer Technician Course, UAS Command and Staff Officer Course, and the UAS Platoon Leader Course.
