= 1st Aviation Brigade (United States) =

- Active: 1966–1973; 1977–present
- Country: United States of America
- Branch: United States Army
- Type: Aviation brigade
- Role: Aviation
- Size: Brigade
- Part of: United States Army Aviation Center of Excellence
- Garrison/HQ: Fort Rucker, Alabama

Commanders
- Current commander: Colonel Jason T. Woodward

Insignia
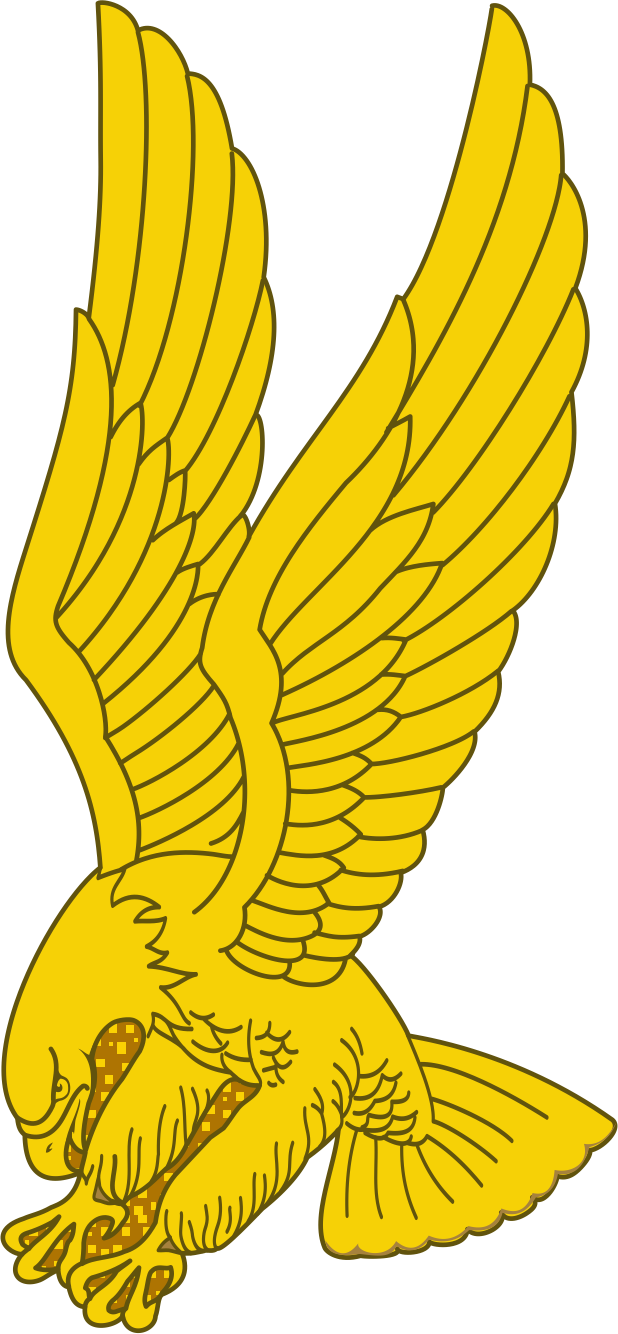
- 1st Aviation Brigade DUI

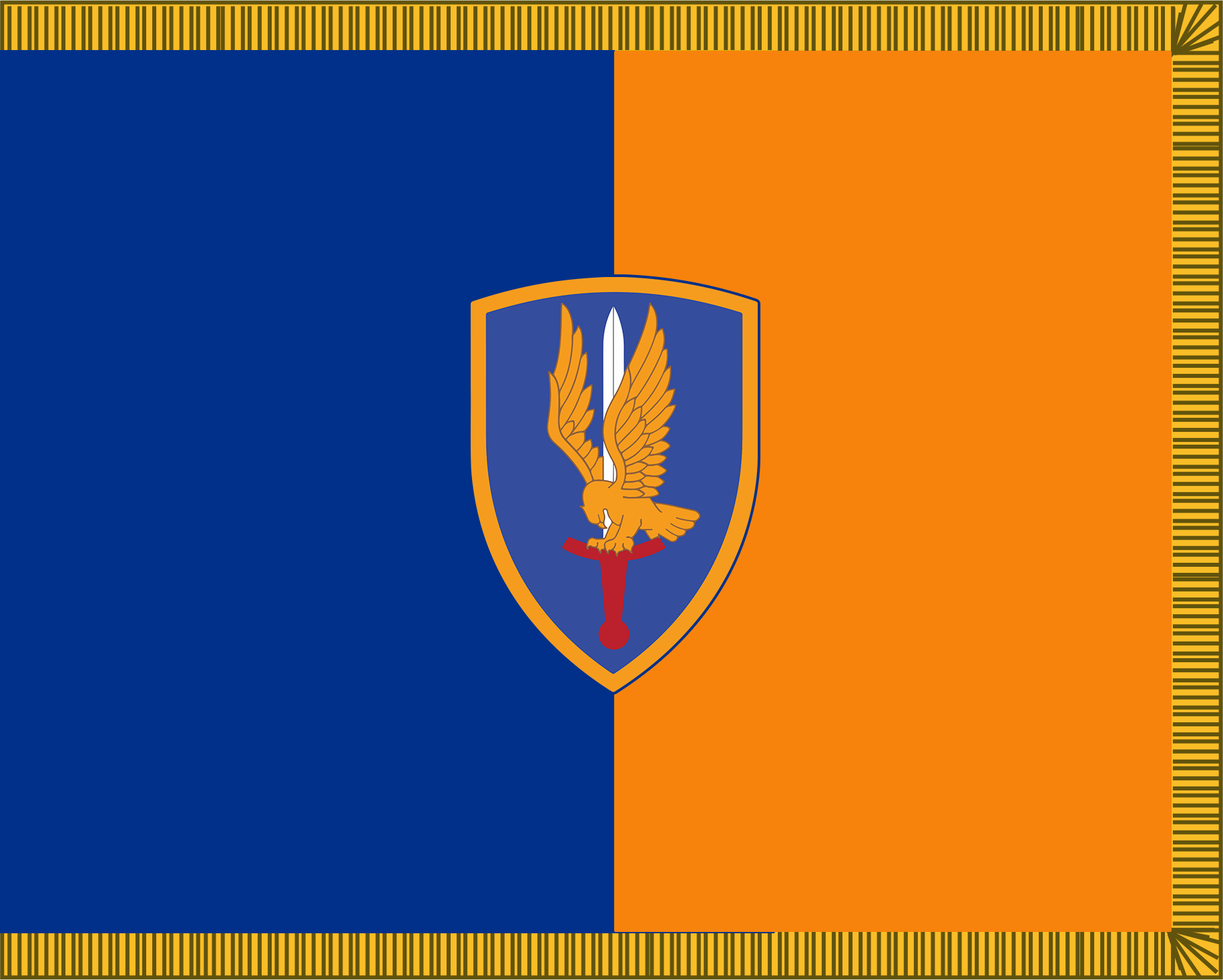
- 1st Aviation Brigade Flag

The 1st Aviation Brigade is an aviation brigade of the United States Army, stationed at Fort Rucker in Alabama. It commands three distinctly different battalions—the 1st Battalion, 13th Aviation Regiment; the 1st Battalion, 145th Aviation Regiment; and the 2nd Battalion, 13th Aviation Regiment, the former Unmanned Aircraft Systems Training Battalion at Fort Huachuca, Arizona.

== History ==
=== Formation and Vietnam service ===
The 1st Aviation Brigade traces its origins to the Vietnam War. In April 1965 the U.S. Army Aviation Brigade (Provisional) was activated with the existing 13th, 14th, 52nd, and 145th Aviation Battalions, (Note: September 24th, 1963 brought to a close the 45th Transportation Battalion and gave birth to the 145th Combat Aviation Battalion.) already in South Vietnam, reporting to it. In August 1965 it became the 12th Aviation Group, which then doubled in size and was used to form the 1st Aviation Brigade in March 1966. Dunstan, in Vietnam Choppers writes that the numerous independent aviation companies deployed during the war's early years had become difficult to move between sectors because they had developed 'individual means of operating in conjunction with the formations they supported.' Thus the brigade was formed to achieve standardization.

Brigadier General George P. Seneff Jr., the Staff Aviation Officer at Military Assistance Command, Vietnam (MACV), became the brigade commander. Because the requirements varied in each part of South Vietnam, the brigade tried to collocate one assault helicopter company with each U.S. brigade and in course of time each Republic of Korea brigade. The companies supporting Army of the Republic of Vietnam units were located in centralized positions to best provide support. The brigade assigned one combat aviation battalion headquarters in direct support of each infantry division and this battalion headquarters normally worked with that division no matter how many companies might be assigned for a specific mission. The Brigade Headquarters and Headquarters Company was located in Saigon from May 1966 until August 1967. Then the HQ moved to Long Binh where it remained until Long Binh was closed in the early autumn of 1972. The HQ then moved to the MACV compound at Tan Son Nhut, where it stayed until withdrawal.

At this time the 52nd Aviation Battalion supported the 4th Infantry Division in the Central Highlands, the 10th Aviation Battalion supported the brigade of the 101st Airborne Division and the Republic of Korea division, the 11th Combat Aviation Battalion supported the 1st Infantry Division, the 214th supported the 9th Infantry Division and the 269th Aviation Battalion supported the 25th Infantry Division. The 13th Battalion, which was later to become a full group, remained in the Mekong Delta. Two aviation groups, the 17th and the 12th, supervised the aviation assets in the II and III Corps Tactical Zones respectively. The aviation group commander was also the aviation officer for the U.S. Field Force commander.

Allen M. Burdett Jr., commanded the brigade from 1969 to 1970 and afterwards commanded the Army's Aviation Center of Excellence (from 1970 to 1973).

During June 1970, the 1st Aviation Brigade reached its largest size: four combat aviation groups, 16 combat aviation battalions and 83 companies totalling over 4,000 aircraft and 27,000 personnel. (Note: Constituted 25 April 1966 in the Regular Army as Headquarters and Headquarters Company, 222d Aviation Battalion. Activated 25 May 1966 in Vietnam.) The 34th General Support Group (Aviation Maintenance and Supply) was transferred to the control of 1st Aviation Brigade in November 1971 where it continued in operation well into 1972. On the signing of the cease-fire on 28 January 1973, the Brigade, then commanded by Jack V. Mackmull, had been reduced to 5,000 personnel and 420 aircraft in four combat aviation groups. The brigade returned to Fort Rucker, Alabama, on 24 March 1973, and was inactivated on 6 April 1973.

According to Shelby Stanton's Vietnam Order of Battle, subordinate brigade units in South Vietnam included:

- 11th, 12th, 16th, 17th, 160th, 165th Aviation Groups
- the 164th Aviation Group was activated from the assets of a Provisional Aviation Group in the IV Corps Tactical Zone in 1968, and was located at Can Tho throughout its time in Vietnam.
- 10th, 11th, 13th, 14th, 52nd, 58th, 145th, 210th, 212th, 214th, 222nd, 223rd, 268th, 269th, (Note: Note the 187 Aslt Hel Co served with this battalion March 1967-Apr 1971, before being transferred to the 11th Avn Bn., with which it served Apr 1971-14 Feb 72, inactivated that day. Stanton, Vietnam Order of Battalion, 113, 119.) 307th, 308th Aviation Battalions
- PHANTOM, DELTA, CAPITAL, I Corps, BUFFALO Aviation Battalions (Provisional)
- 7th Squadron, 1st Cavalry Regiment (12th, then 164th Aviation Group); 1st Squadron, 9th Cavalry (after 10 April 1973, when the 1st Cavalry Division left Vietnam); 3rd Squadron, 17th Cavalry (part of the 12th Aviation Group); 7th Squadron, 17th Cavalry (attached to 17th Aviation Group). These units were all Air Cavalry Squadrons

=== Current formation ===
On 18 February 1977 the brigade was reactivated at Fort Rucker as a training formation. Vietnam War combat veteran John Bahnsen commanded the 1st Aviation Brigade in the late 1970s and early 1980s.

The 1st Aviation Brigade's primary mission has been to train and develop future aviation warfighting leaders. Including the lessons learned from deployed units, instructors and students write, review, and coordinate Army Aviation combined arms doctrine for aviation units below brigade level.

The course curriculum consists of a wide range of professional military education subjects, with emphasis on combined arms battlefield integration. The tactical training is further reinforced with state-of-the-art simulation, allowing students to assume various command and staff positions at all command levels while fighting simulated battles throughout a wide spectrum of tactical scenarios. Equally important is the initial entry training (IET) taught to entry level Aviation Branch Soldiers. IET teaches fundamental skills for U.S. Army personnel to perform their occupational specialties in an aviation unit.

== In popular culture ==
- In the TV-series The A-Team (1983–87), the fictional character of Army Captain Howling Mad Murdock wears the shoulder sleeve insignia of the 1st Aviation Brigade in the episode "A Nice Place to Visit".
- In the 2017 movie, Kong: Skull Island the U.S. Army Aviation unit assigned to support the scientific research team, wear the 1st Aviation Brigade patch on their jungle fatigues and flight suits.
