= 8th Aerial Port Squadron =

Inactive US Air Force unit

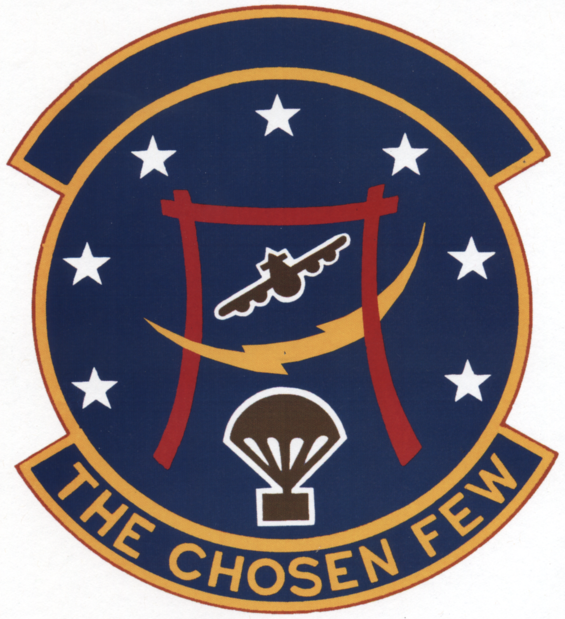
- Active: 1962–73
- Country: United States
- Branch: United States Air Force
- Engagements: Vietnam War

The 8th Aerial Port Squadron is an inactive unit of the United States Air Force.

== History ==
The squadron was activated on 8 December 1962 at Tan Son Nhut Air Base, South Vietnam as part of the 315th Troop Carrier Group, Assault, replacing the 6493rd Aerial Port Squadron (provisional). The 6493rd included 135 permanently assigned personnel, 15 others on temporary assignment and 61 Vietnamese and Thai nationals for unskilled tasks. Most were located at Tan Son Nhut and Bangkok's Don Muang Royal Thai Air Force Base.

In May 1963 the squadron established detachments at Qui Nhon Airfield (Detachment 6) and Cần Thơ Base Camp (Detachment 7). In June a detachment moved to Bien Hoa Air Base (Detachment 5) from Thailand. In October Military Air Transport Service air terminal detachments at Tan Son Nhut and Dong Muang were merged into the 8th Aerial Port Squadron. In December 1963 Detachment 4 was formed at Nha Trang Air Base.

In December 1964 a detachment was established at Vung Tau Air Base.

In April 1965 the 6th Aerial Port Squadron was established at Don Muang to replace 8th Squadron detachment there.

On 1 December 1965 the 14th Aerial Port Squadron was established at Cam Ranh Air Base and the 15th Aerial Port Squadron was established at Danang Air Base, together with the 8th they had 35 detachments across South Vietnam.

In September 1966 the squadron received the National Defense Transportation Award for its outstanding service while operating "under combat conditions, in a hostile environment, coupled with shortages of material and personnel."

In early 1968 an aerial port mobility team drawn from the 8th and 15th Aerial Port Squadrons served at Khe Sanh Combat Base during the Battle of Khe Sanh.

On 1 February 1971 a combat control team from the squadron was deployed to the reopened Dong Ha Combat Base to provide communications and traffic control services in support of Operation Lam Son 719. Two six-man aerial port mobility teams were later moved to the reopened Khe Sanh Combat Base where they handled cargo in support of the operation.

The start of the Easter Offensive in late March 1972 found the aerial port system severely depleted by Vietnamization and hard-pressed to meet the demands for transport of South Vietnamese forces north. Cargo handling rose from 18,000 tons in March to 47,000 tons in April and 51,000 tons in March. The squadron attributed a rising accident rate to personnel fatigue.

=== Assignments ===
- 315th Troop Carrier Group, 8 December 1962 – 8 March 1966
- 2nd Aerial Port Group, 15 October 1966 - 1973
