= Allen M. Burdett Jr. =

United States Army officer

Lieutenant General Allen Mitchell Burdett Jr.
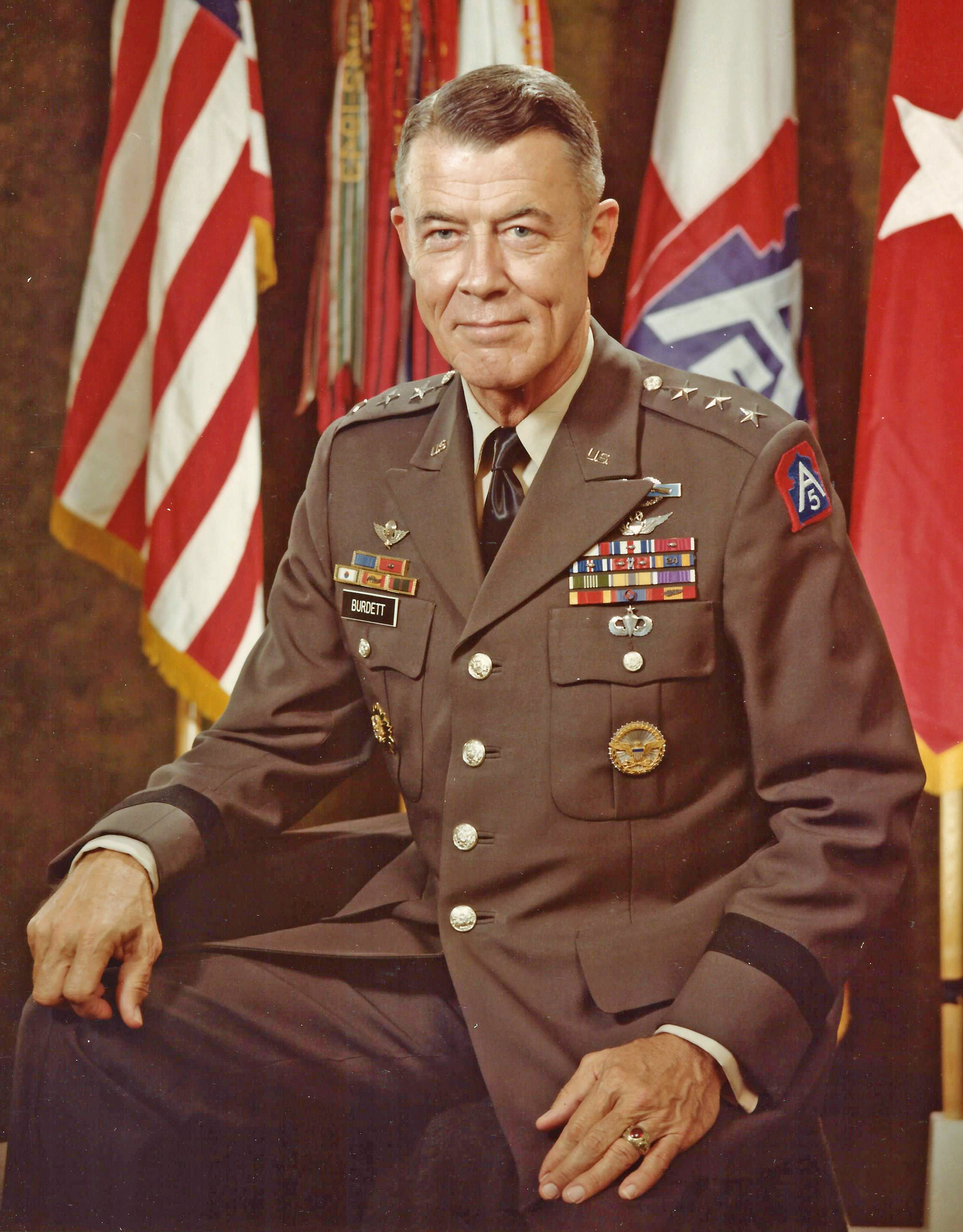
- Born: August 25, 1921; Washington, D.C.
- Died: July 8, 1980 (aged 58); San Antonio, Texas
- Burial place: Fort Sam Houston National Cemetery, San Antonio, Texas
- Spouse: Antoinette Salley (1948–1980) (his death)
- Relatives: Allen M. Burdett, Sr. (father); Margaret Burdett (mother); Lucien Burdett (brother); Allen M. Burdett III (son); Douglas Burdett (son); William Burdett (son); Margaret Burdett (daughter)
- Military career
- Allegiance: United States
- Branch: United States Army
- Service years: 1943–1978
- Rank: Lieutenant General
- Service number: 0-26048
- Commands: see below
- Conflicts: World War II; Korean War; Vietnam War
- Awards: Army Distinguished Service Medal; Silver Star Medal; Legion of Merit; Distinguished Flying Cross; Bronze Star Medal; Air Medal; Purple Heart

Allen Mitchell Burdett Jr. (25 August 1921 – 8 July 1980) was a United States Army lieutenant general.

== Early life ==
Burdett was born in Washington, D.C., on August 25, 1921, to Allen Sr. and Margaret Burdett. He also had a brother named Lucien. His ancestors fought in every American conflict since the Revolutionary War. His father, a highly respected military judge, became the Army's senior JAG colonel. As a Boy Scout at Fort Leavenworth, Kansas, Burdett began his lifelong friendship with a future United States Military Academy (USMA) classmate, Arch Hamblen. Upon graduation from Western High School in Washington, D.C., in 1939, he was appointed to the USMA by Senator Richard Russell Jr. of Georgia.

== Education ==
- 1943: Bachelor of Science, United States Military Academy
- 1951: Graduate Infantry School
- 1953: Command and General Staff College
- 1955: Armed Forces Staff College, Norfolk, Virginia
- 1959: Army War College
- 1965: Master's degree in International Affairs, George Washington University

== Military service ==
=== Dates of rank ===
- June 1, 1943: Second lieutenant
- December 1, 1943: First lieutenant
- November 6, 1944: Captain
- August 7, 1946: Major
- March 16, 1953: Lieutenant colonel
- September 1, 1959: Colonel
- October 22, 1966: Brigadier general
- c. 1970: Major general
- 1973: Lieutenant general

=== Assignments ===
- 1940 – 1943: Attended the United States Military Academy, graduated on June 1, 1943
- 1943 – 1947: Served in World War II with the Headquarters and Headquarters Company, 255th Infantry Regiment, 63rd Infantry Division, commissioned (ASN: O-26048), reached the rank of major
- 1947 – 1950: Assistant professor, military science and tactics, Georgia Institute of Technology
- 1950 – 1952: S3 and battalion executive officer, 508th Airborne Regimental Combat Team
- 1953 – 1954: Infantry battalion commander, regimental executive officer, 31st Infantry Regiment, 7th Infantry Division
- 1954: G1 and G2, 7th Infantry Division
- 1955 – 1958: Army Representative Office of the Commandant of the United States Air Force Academy
- 1960 – 1962: Director of the Combat Devels and worked in the office of the deputy assistant commandant of the Army Aviation School
- 1962 – 1965: Executive officer to the Assistant Secretary of the Army
- 1965 – 1966: Commanding officer of the 11th Aviation Group, 1st Cavalry Division
- 1966 – 1968: Military assistant in the Office of the Director of the Office of Defense, Research and Engineering
- 1968 – 1969: Assistant division commander, 101st Airborne Division
- 1969 – 1970: Commanding general of the 1st Aviation Brigade
- 1970: Director of Army Aviation, Office of the Assistant Chief of Staff for Force Development, Department of the Army
- 1970 – 1973: Commanding general of the United States Army Aviation Center and commandant of the United States Army Aviation School, Fort Rucker, Alabama
- 1973 – 1975: Commanding general of III Corps, Fort Hood, Texas
- 1975 – 1978: Commanding general of the 5th United States Army, Fort Sam Houston, Texas
- 1978: Retired from military service on June 30, 1978, with the rank of lieutenant general.

== Personal life ==
On 19 April 1948, Burdett married Antoinette Salley in Asheville, North Carolina. Together they had four children (Allen III, Douglas, William, and Margaret). His daughter was killed in a car accident in 1984. His wife died on April 24, 2008.

== After retirement ==
He continued his work with the Board of Directors of the United Services Automobile Association (USAA). He was a longtime member of the Army-Navy Town Club and the Army-Navy Country Club; as a member of the Falls Church Presbyterian Church, Falls Church, Virginia, he served as a deacon; as a member of the Covenant Presbyterian Church, San Antonio, he was a ruling elder. He was also a member of the Society of the Cincinnati.

== Death ==
Burdett died of cancer on July 8, 1980, in San Antonio, Texas, following a two-month illness. He was buried in the Fort Sam Houston National Cemetery in San Antonio, Texas.

== Awards & decorations ==
- Combat Infantryman Badge
- United States Army Senior Aviator Badge
- Senior Parachutist Badge
- Army Staff Identification Badge
- Office of the Secretary of Defense Identification Badge
- Army Distinguished Service Medal with bronze oak leaf cluster
- Silver Star Medal with bronze oak leaf cluster
- Legion of Merit with bronze oak leaf cluster
- Distinguished Flying Cross with bronze oak leaf cluster
- Bronze Star Medal with 2 oak leaf clusters
- Air Medal with 24 oak leaf clusters
- Army Commendation Medal
- Air Force Commendation Medal
- Purple Heart
- National Order of Vietnam 5th Class
- Republic of Vietnam Gallantry Cross with palm
- Vietnam Air Force Distinguished Service Order
- Presidential Unit Citation
- Meritorious Unit Commendation with oak leaf cluster
- Republic of Korea Presidential Unit Citation

In 1980 he was inducted into the Army Aviation Hall of Fame in Atlanta, Georgia.

The Lt. Gen. Allen M. Burdett Jr. Army Aviation Flight Safety Award was named in his honor in 1970.

The National Boy Scout Court of Honor awarded him the Silver Beaver, one of Scouting's highest awards.

The San Antonio chapter of the American Red Cross honored him by establishing a volunteer award in his name.
