= Cần Thơ Base Camp =

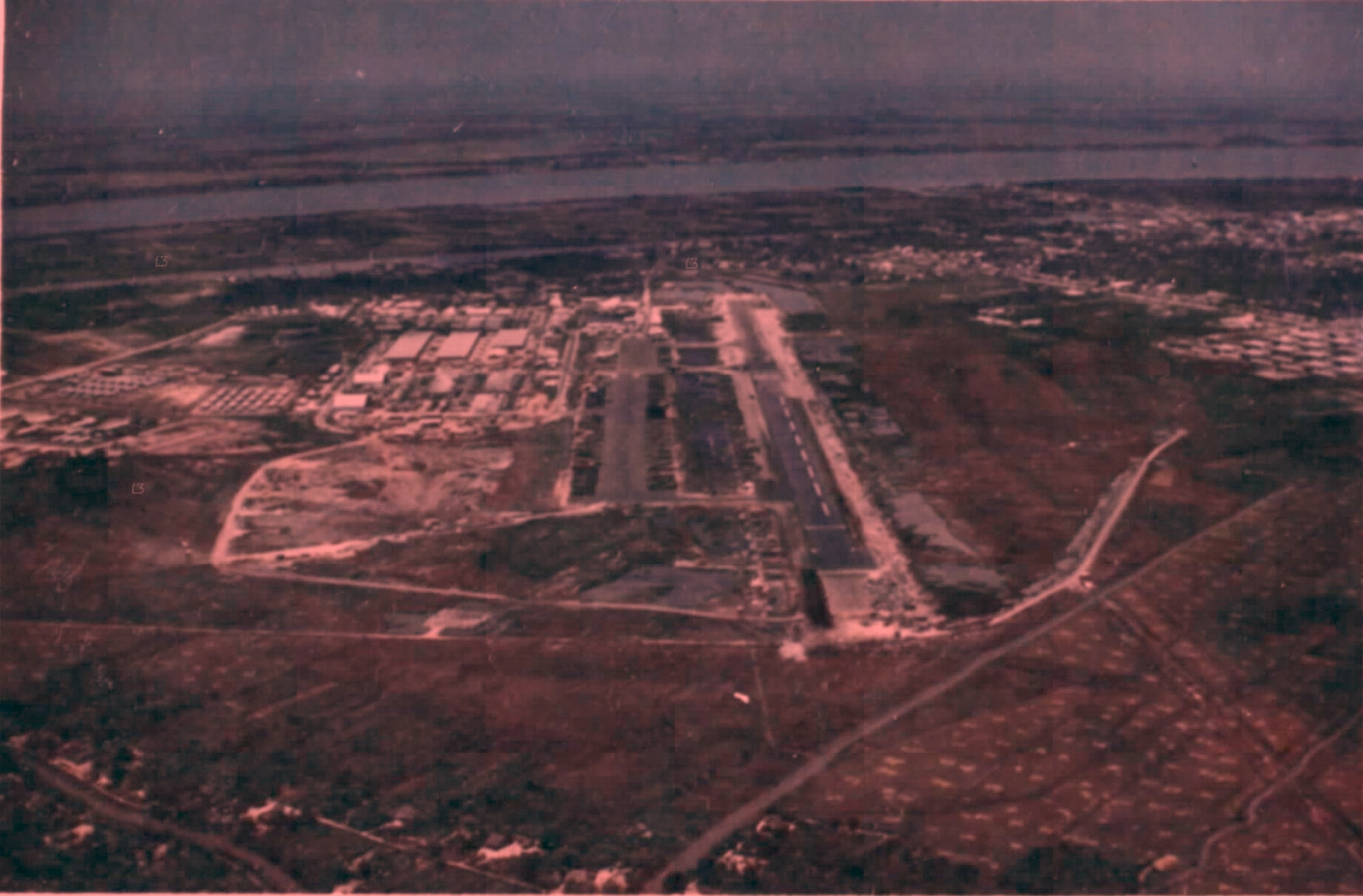
- An aerial view of Can Tho in March 1968

Site information
- Type: Army
- Controlled by: People's Army of Vietnam

Location
- Coordinates: 10.052°N 105.762°E

Site history
- Built: 1930s
- In use: 1930s-present
- Battles/wars: Vietnam War

Garrison information
- Occupants: 9th Infantry Division; Mobile Riverine Force; ARVN 9th Division

Cần Thơ Army Airfield
- IATA: none; ICAO: none

Summary
- Elevation AMSL: 7 ft (2.1 m)
- Interactive map of Cần Thơ Army Airfield

Runways
Direction	Length		Surface
Direction	ft	m	Surface
	3,900	1,189	asphalt

Cần Thơ Base Camp (also known as Cần Thơ Army Airfield) is a former U.S. Army, U.S. Air Force (USAF), Army of the Republic of Vietnam (ARVN), Republic of Vietnam Air Force (RVNAF) and current People's Army of Vietnam (PAVN) base west of Cần Thơ in the Mekong Delta in southern Vietnam.

== History ==
Cần Thơ airfield was originally established during the French colonial period and was later used by the Japanese during World War II.

=== USAF/RVNAF use ===
In June 1962 Detachment 3, 6220th Air Base Squadron was established at Cần Thơ. On 8 July 1963 a Detachment of the 33rd Tactical Group was established at Cần Thơ.

In May 1963 Detachment 7, 8th Aerial Port Squadron was established at Cần Thơ. On 8 July 1963 a Detachment of the 33rd Tactical Group was established at Cần Thơ replacing Detachment 3, 6220th Air Base Squadron.

The RVNAF maintained a detachment from its 122nd Liaison Squadron equipped with 5 O-1 Bird Dogs.

In mid-1963 Military Assistance Command, Vietnam (MACV) proposed the construction of a 6,000-foot (1,800 m) runway near Cần Thơ to replace the existing 3,000-foot (910 m) runway at Sóc Trăng Airfield which was unsuitable for night and wet weather operations with a projected US$4.5 million construction cost and a 2-year construction period.

On the night of 16 July 1963 a Viet Cong (VC) mortar attack on Cần Thơ Airfield wounded 17 ARVN and US Special Forces troops.

In July 1963 the 19th Tactical Air Support Squadron was activated at Bien Hoa Air Base, becoming operational on 15 September, it maintained a detachment of 6 O-1s at Cần Thơ.

In January 1964 given the need for heavier aircraft to be available for quick reaction air support in the Mekong Delta, CINCPAC approved the construction of a new airfield at Cần Thơ for a cost of US$2.5 million to be ready within one year.

Construction of the new Binh Thuy Air Base, 7 km northwest of Cần Thơ Airfield began in February 1964.

In April 1964, Detachment 3, 619th Tactical Control Squadron was organized at the base. In the same month the RVNAF 74th Tactical Wing was established.

=== 1966-72 ===
The base was originally established by the 9th Infantry Division.

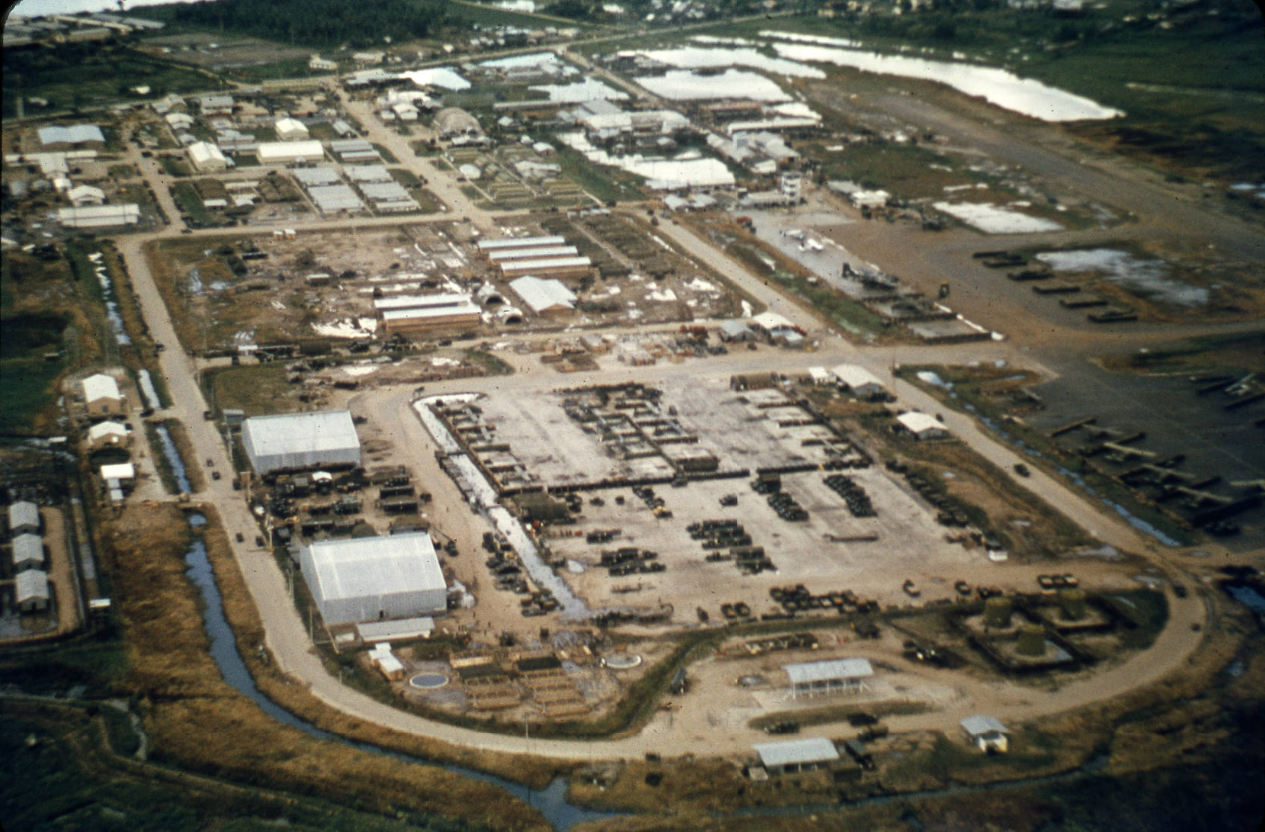
Airfield facilities, 25 September 1967

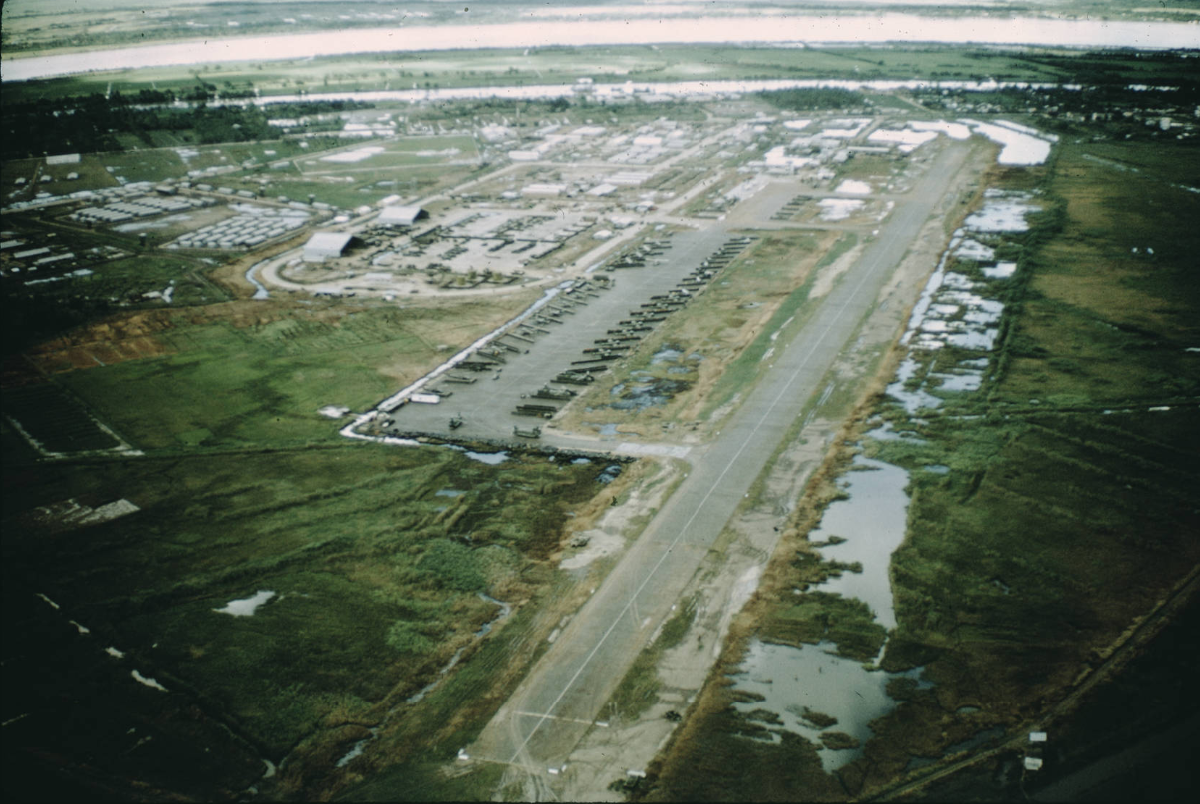
Airfield, 25 September 1967

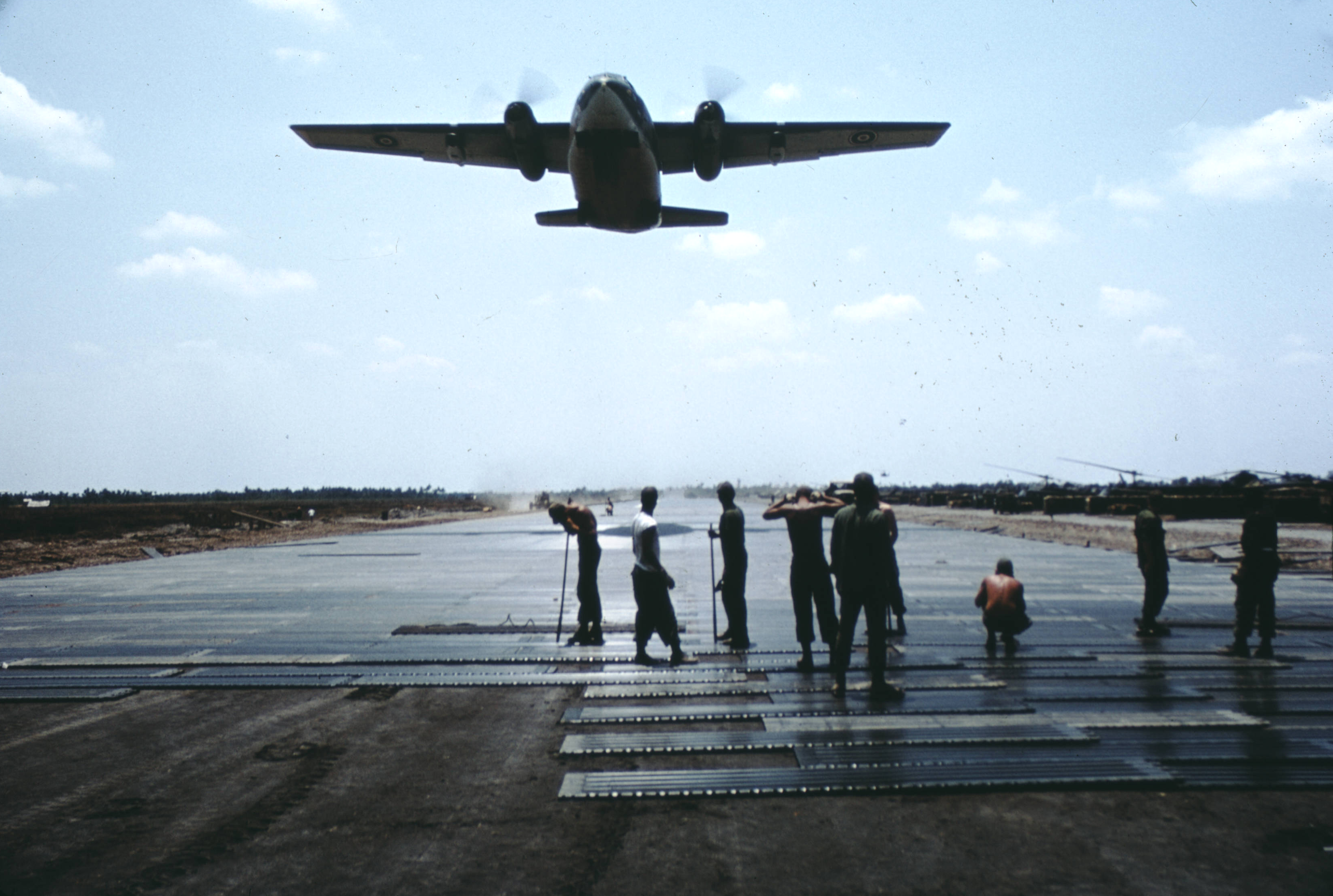
Airfield repairs, 28 March 1968

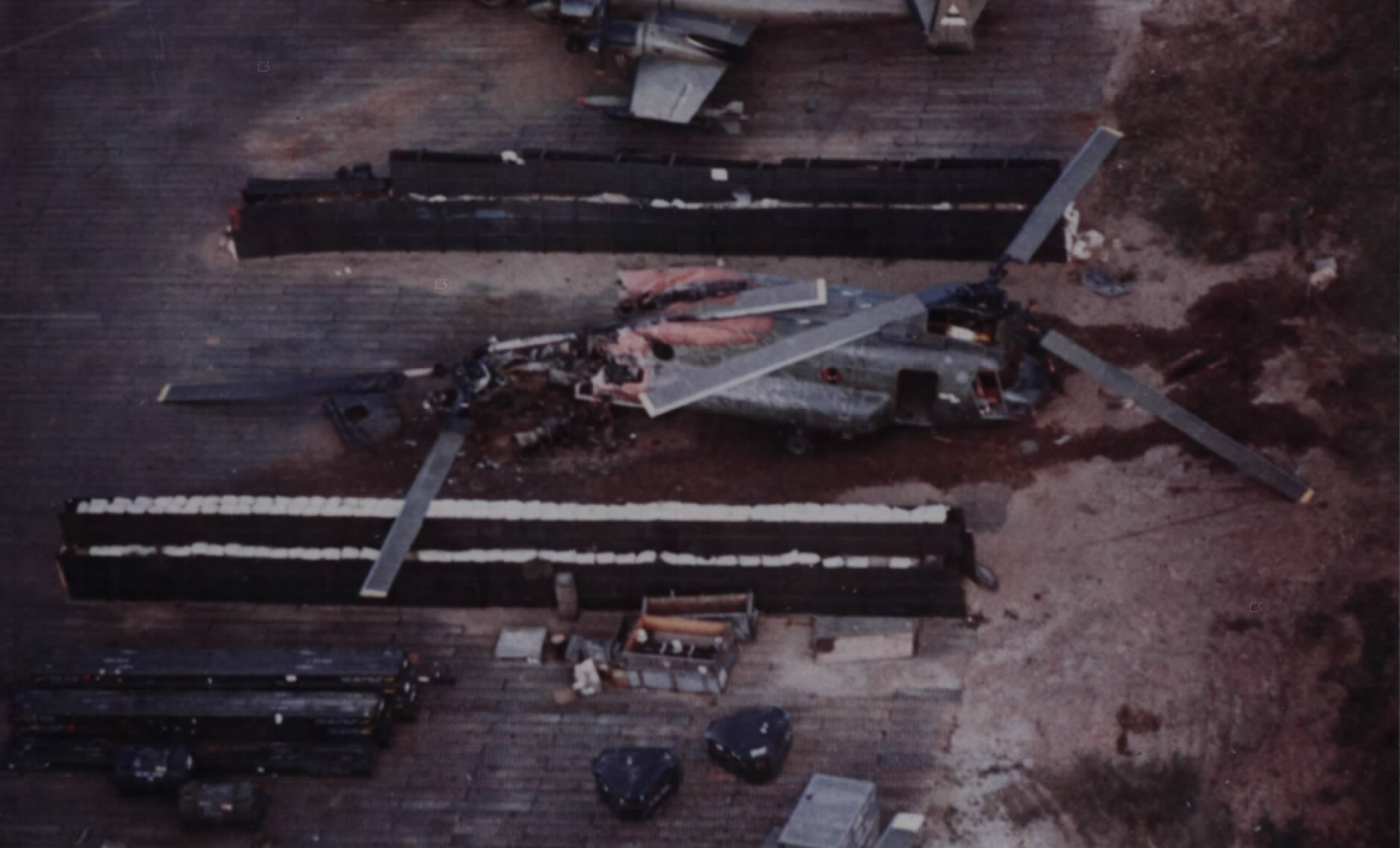
CH-47 destroyed in rocket attack on the Camp, 13 January 1969

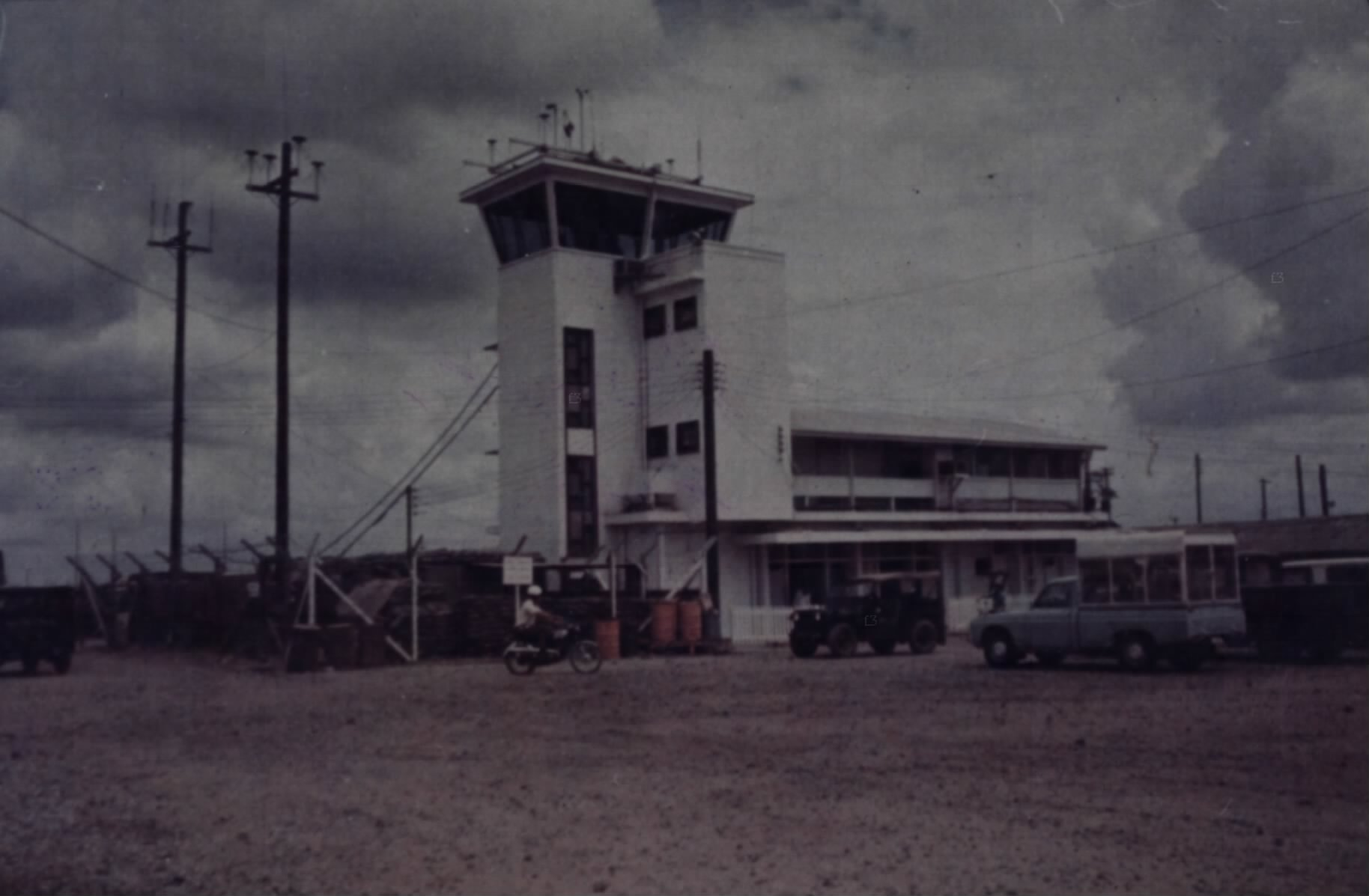
Cần Thơ control tower, 29 April 1970

Other units stationed here included:

- 52nd Signal Battalion (15 October 1966 – 13 October 1971)
- Battery H, 29th Artillery (March–October 1967)
- 6th Battalion, 77th Artillery (July 1968-June 1969)
- 13th Aviation Battalion
- 18th Aviation Company (August 1971-March 1973)
- 235th Aviation Company (November 1967-August 1971)
- 244th Aviation Company (July 1967-November 1970)
- 271st Aviation Company (February 1968-September 1971)
- Troop C, 16th Cavalry (May 1970-January 1971)
- 191st Assault Helicopter Company (September 1969 - 31 August 1971)

The US Air Force 619th Tactical Control Squadron Detachment 3 provided air traffic control until June 1972.

=== 1972-5 ===
Cần Thơ was a base for the ARVN 9th Division until April 1975.

== Current use ==
The base remains in use by the PAVN as the headquarters of the 9th Military Region. The airfield is no longer used but still clearly visible on satellite images.
