= Vinh Long Airfield =

Vĩnh Long Airfield
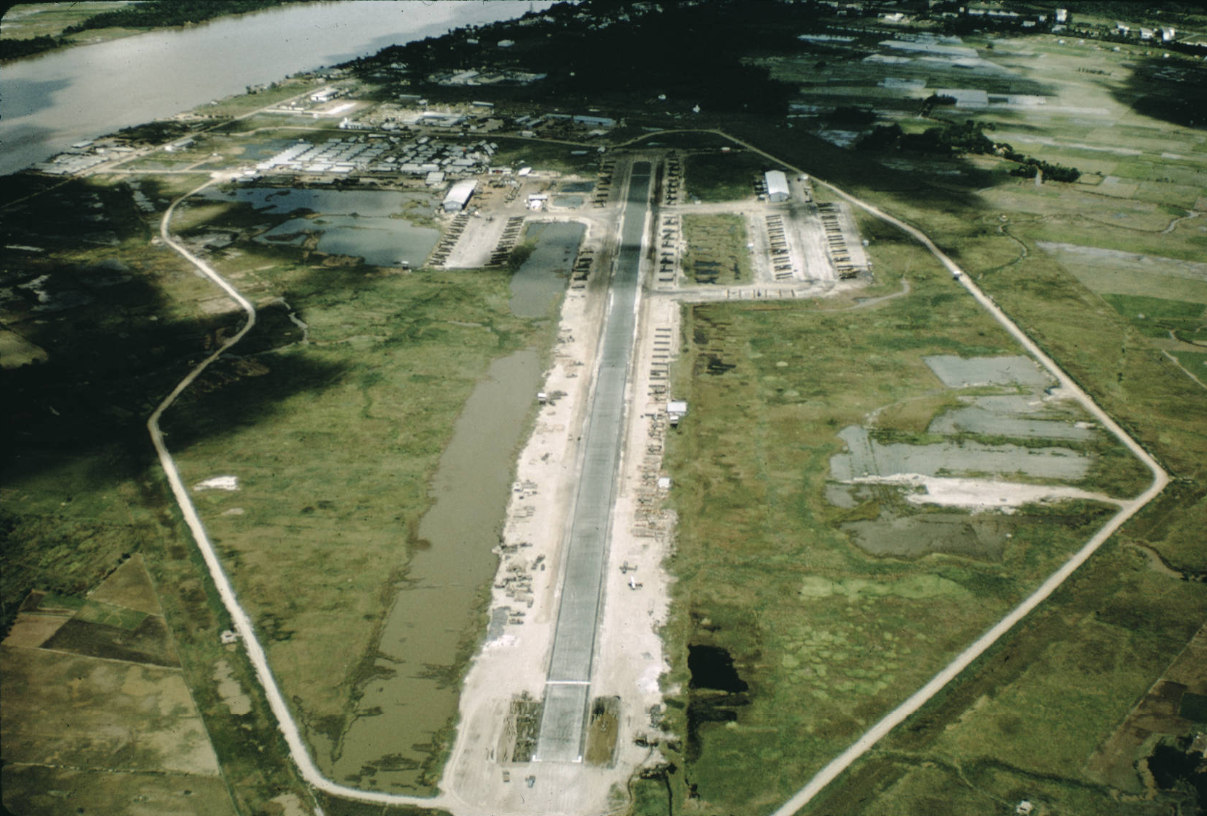
- 25 September 1967

Location
- Coordinates: 10.251°N 105.947°E

Site history
- Built: 1963
- In use: 1963-75
- Battles/wars: Vietnam War

Vĩnh Long Airfield
- IATA: XVL; ICAO: none

Summary
- Elevation AMSL: 10 ft (3.0 m)

Runways
Direction	Length		Surface
Direction	ft	m	Surface
	3,000	914	asphalt

Vĩnh Long Airfield (also known as Vĩnh Long Army Airfield, Gauvin-Upton Airfield or Shannon-Wright Compound) is a former United States Army base west of Vĩnh Long in Vĩnh Long Province, Mekong Delta, Vietnam.

== History ==
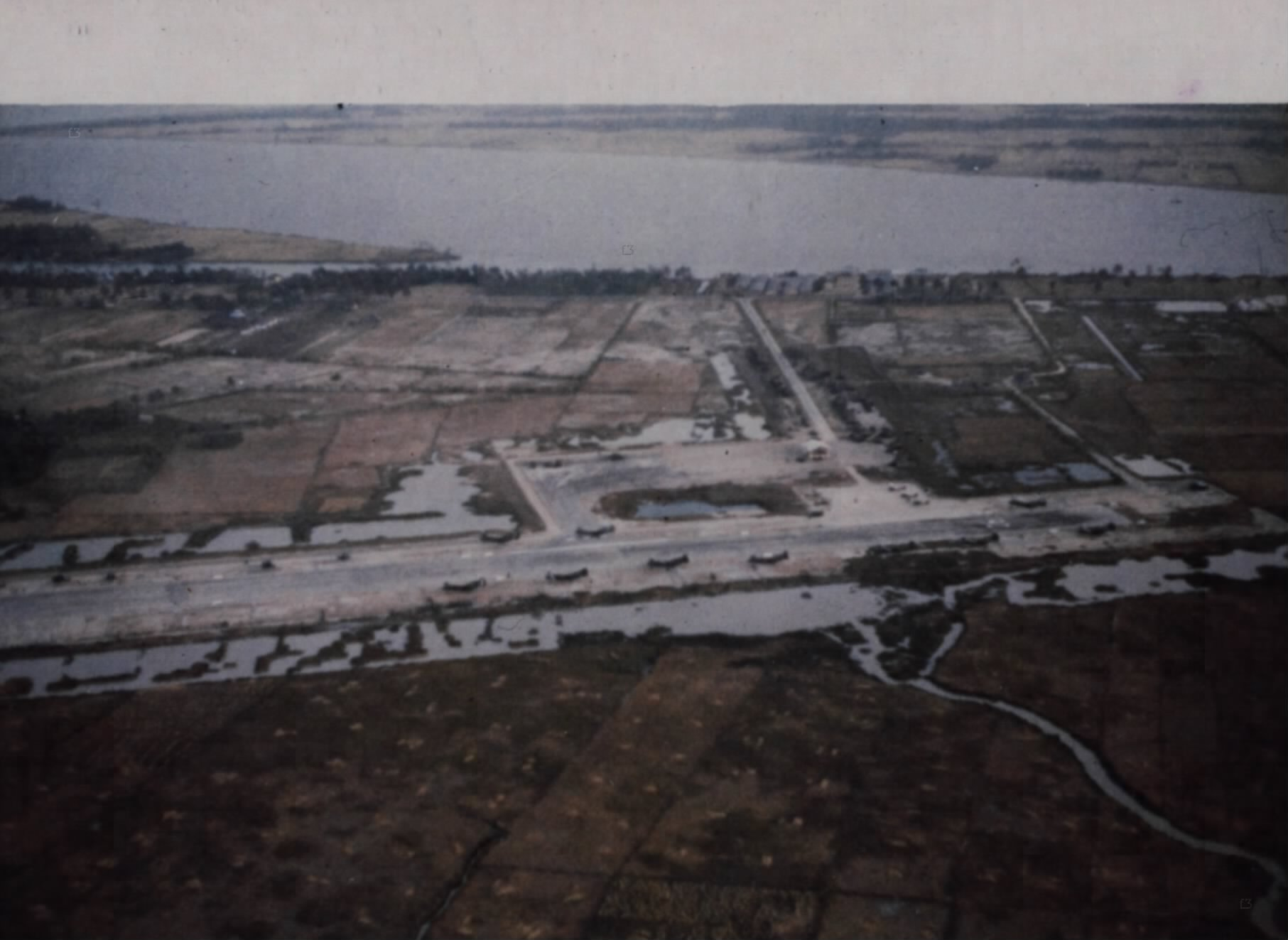
CH-21s at Vĩnh Long, February 1963

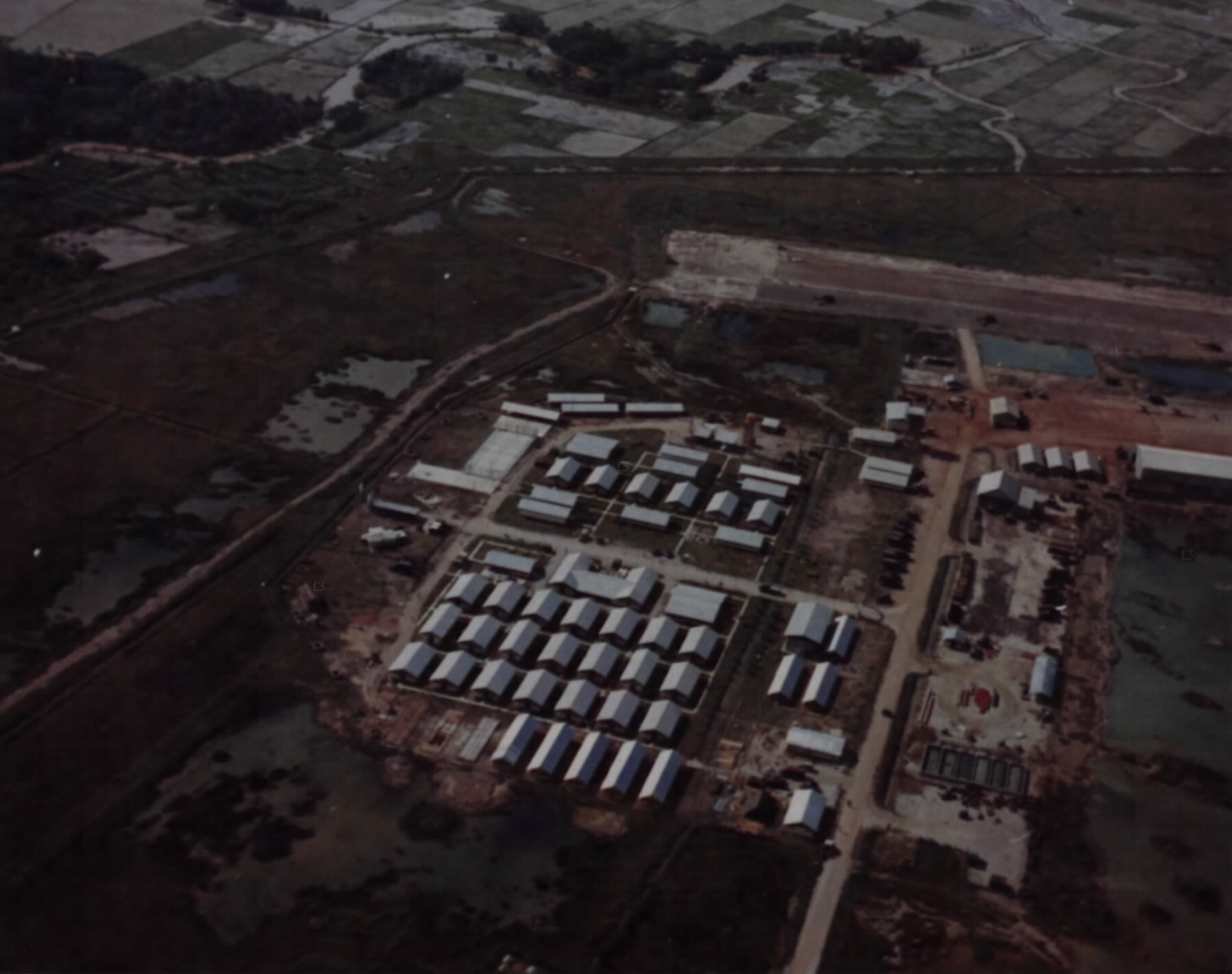
Airfield facilities, October 1964.jpg

The base was originally established in 1963 approximately 3 km west of Vĩnh Long and 48 km southwest of Mỹ Tho. The base was named after 1st. Lt. Kenneth Arthur Shannon and Spc. 5 Wyley Wright of the 114th Aviation Company who were killed in action on 15 March 1964.

The base was attacked by Vietcong forces as part of the Tet Offensive on 31 January 1968 resulting in seven U.S. killed and three Bell UH-1 Iroquois helicopters destroyed. In 1970 the Airfield was attacked on May 5th receiving 45 rounds of incoming mortar fire causing heavy damage to helicopters and buildings. Spec 4 Dennis Michael Sheppard was wounded when his bunker took a direct hit. The mortar attack was followed up with a ground assault eventually the enemy withdrew.

The 2nd Brigade, 9th Infantry Division comprising:

- 3rd Battalion, 47th Infantry
- 4th Battalion, 47th Infantry

was based here from April–May 1968.

Other units stationed at Vĩnh Long at various times included:

- 7th Squadron, 1st Cavalry Regiment (June 1968-April 1972)
- 62nd Aviation Company (October–December 1964)
- 114th Assault Helicopter Company (May 1963-February 1972)
- 175th Assault Helicopter Company (September 1966-February 1972)
- 199th Assault Helicopter Company (July 1967-October 1970)
- 292nd Finance Section (1967-October 1972)
- 502nd Aviation Battalion (December 1964-September 1966)
- HA(L)-3 Detachment 3 (January 1968)
- 28th and 96th Avionics Signal Detachment
- A Company, 501st Aviation Battalion arrived during December 1964

== Current use ==
The base was renovated into many civil facilities and the runway has become Võ Văn Kiệt street. The airfield is now permanently closed as an active military facility. It is currently used by the Vietnamese government for driver testing. Portions of the base have been transformed into a military museum featuring hardware such as UH-1 Huey helicopters, tanks, and other weaponry from the war. The original French colonial buildings, a bunker, and the two historic water towers from the 1960s U.S. base era are still intact and serve as town landmarks.

== Accidents and incidents ==
- On 18 December 1970 two OH-6 Cayuse light observation helicopters collided shortly after takeoff and crashed destroying both and killing all four crewmen
