= United States Army Aviation Center of Excellence =

Coordinates: 31.3296°N 85.7117°W

U.S. Army Aviation Center of Excellence
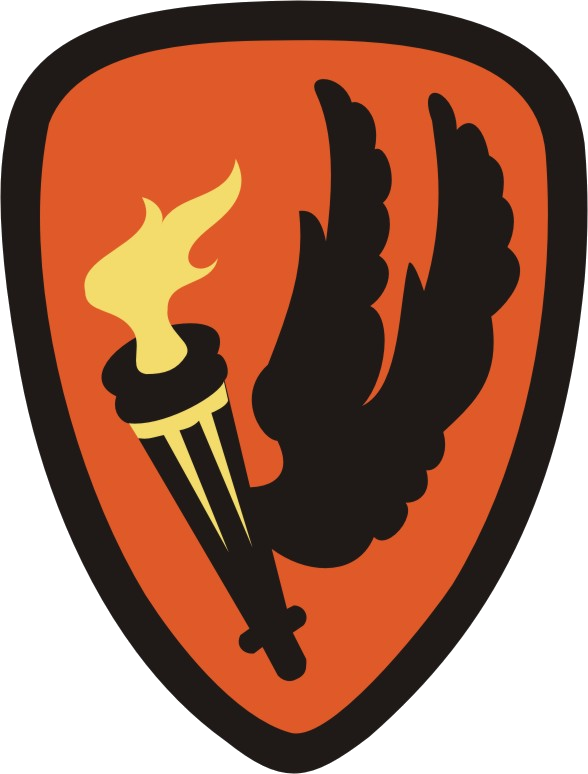
- Shoulder Sleeve Insignia
- Active: 2006; 20 years ago – present
- Country: United States
- Branch: United States Army
- Role: Training and Development
- Part of: United States Army Combined Arms Command
- Garrison/HQ: Fort Rucker, Alabama
- Website: https://home.army.mil/rucker/

Commanders
- Current commander: MG Phillip C. Baker
- Command Sergeant Major: CSM Kirk R. Coley

Insignia
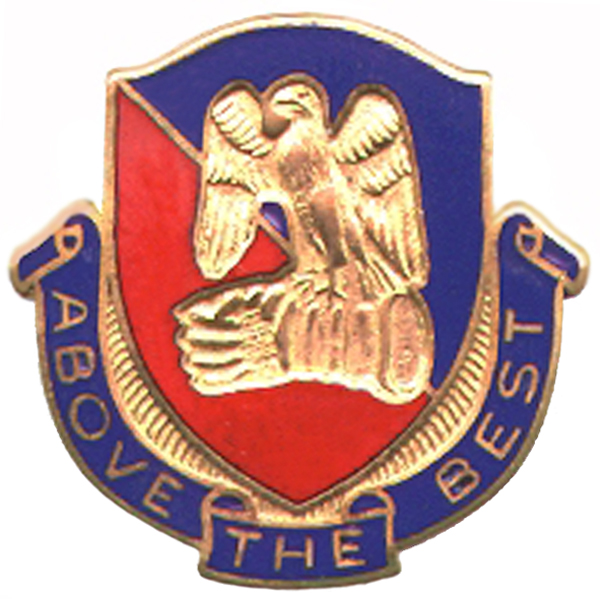
- Distinctive unit insignia

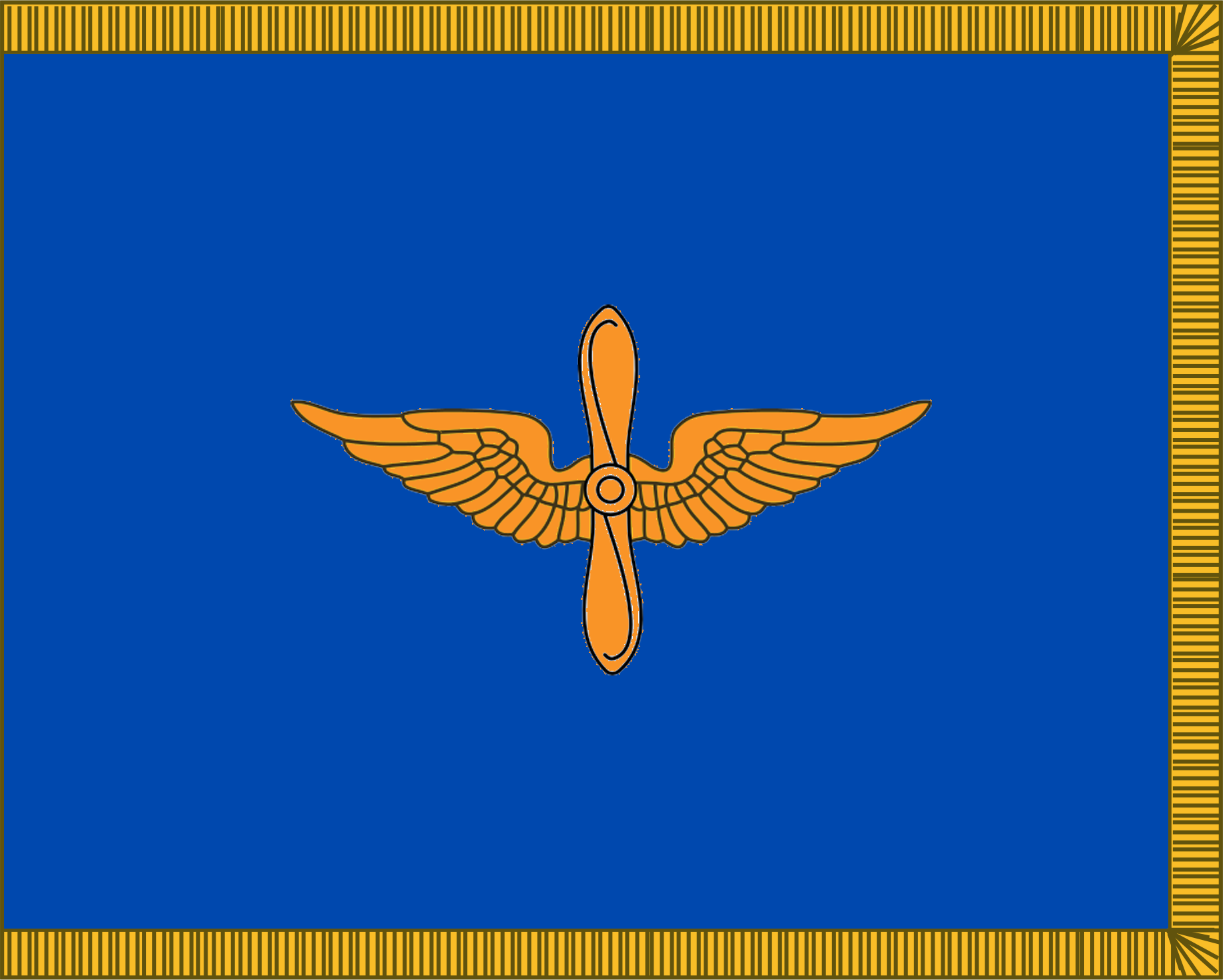
- US Army Aviation Branch Flag

The U.S. Army Aviation Center of Excellence (AVCOE) is the United States Army Aviation Branch's headquarters, and its training and development center, located at Fort Rucker, Alabama. The Aviation Center of Excellence, as a national army aviation school, coordinates and deploys aviation operations and trains aviation officers in a variety of topics, including classroom navigation instruction, aircraft piloting, and basic combat.

The Center of Excellence includes three aviation brigades, the 1st Aviation Brigade, 110th Aviation Brigade, and 128th Aviation Brigade, various army tenant organizations, and a non-commissioned officers' academy.

== History ==
Most training of pilots and mechanics for World War II army aviators was conducted by the Department of Air Training within the Field Artillery School at Henry Post Army Airfield, Oklahoma, although the Army Air Forces conducted some primary training of Army Aviation personnel. In early 1953, during the Korean War, the Department of Air Training at Post Field expanded and became the Army Aviation School. As a result of the expansion of both aviation and artillery training, Post Field became overcrowded. So the Army decided to move the Army Aviation School to a different post. When no satisfactory permanent Army post was found, Camp Rucker (now Fort Rucker, formerly Fort Novosel) was chosen as a temporary post. The Army Aviation School moved to Alabama in August,1954 and the first class began at Rucker that October.

On February 1,1955, the Army Aviation Center was officially established at Rucker. In the same year during the month of October, the post was given permanent status and changed their name from Camp Rucker to Fort Rucker. Before the mid-1950s, the Air Force had provided primary training for Army Aviation pilots and mechanics. In 1956, the U.S. Department of Defense gave the Army control over its preparation. Gary and Wolters Air Force Bases in Texas is where the Air Force had been conducting this training. Also transferred to the Army and lacking adequate facilities at Fort Rucker, Army Aviation continued primary fixed-wing training at Camp Gary until 1959 and primary rotary-wing training at Fort Wolters until 1973.

The pioneer African American flying instructor Milton Crenchaw taught at then-Camp Rucker from 1954 to 1966.

In 1956, the Army Aviation Center began assembling and testing weapons on helicopters. These tests were conducted while the Air Force still theoretically had exclusive responsibility for aerial fire support. This led to the development of armament systems for Army helicopters.

In 2005, the Base Realignment and Closure Commission proposed that Aviation logistics establishments at Fort Eustis should be consolidated with the Aviation Center and School at Fort Rucker. Although this did not take place, the U.S. Army Aviation Warfighting Center was eventually renamed the U.S. Army Aviation Center of Excellence on June 26, 2006.

== Command and Directorates ==
The Unmanned Aerial Systems Center of Excellence (UAS COE), as the U.S. Army UAS Proponent's principle management agency, provides intensive, centralized total capacity management and Unmanned Aerial System integration.

The UAS COE provides "integration and coordination with all Army organizations, the joint services, and other Defense Department agencies to achieve the U.S. Army UAS strategy that includes concepts for current, emerging and future UAS interoperability with all manned and unmanned systems".

The 110th Aviation Brigade consists of four battalions using three different sites. The 1st Battalion, 11th Aviation Regiment, operates and manages air traffic control services for USAACE/Fort Novosel and the National Airspace System. The 1st Battalion, 14th Aviation Regiment all operate from Hanchey Army Heliport and conduct graduate-level training using the AH-64 Apache attack helicopter. The 1st Battalion, 212th Aviation Regiment operates from Lowe Army Heliport and Shell Army Heliport and conducts combat and night operational training, using OH-58 Kiowa, UH-1 Iroquois, and UH-60 Blackhawk helicopters. 1st Battalion, 223rd Aviation Regiment operates from Cairns Army Airfield and Knox Army Heliport and conducts flight training using the CH-47 Chinook helicopter and C-12 Huron aircraft.

== Training ==
At the center, students learn to fly in aviation assets to assist United States forces with the 110th Aviation Brigade. Students usually spend 15–18 months in aviation school, learning a wide range of subjects, and finally graduating with their "wings" or Aviator's Badge. When second lieutenants arrive at Fort Rucker after graduating from their commissioning source (USMA, ROTC, or OCS) they secure housing and they attend the two-month Basic Officer Leadership Course (BOLC) at Fort Rucker. Upon completion, they join the rest of their classmates who usually consists of Junior Warrant Officers that have previous enlisted experience.

Before starting academics, students must complete Dunker training and Army SERE (Survival, Evasion, Resistance, and Escape) school. After SERE, students transition to Initial Entry Rotary Wing Aeromedical Training (also known as "aeromed") at the U.S. Army School of Aviation Medicine. They learn subjects about flight and the human body. The information taught in these classes is tested frequently by the instructor pilots (IPs) throughout flight school. Flight training varies by student and aircraft type, but in general, students will complete basic flight training, instrument flight training, and basic combat skills training in a UH-72A Lakota.

== List of commanding generals ==
No.	Commanding General		Term		
No.	Portrait	Name	Took office	Left office	Duration
1	Carl I. Hutton	Brigadier General; Carl I. Hutton (1906–1966)	1 February 1955	June 1957	~2 years, 134 days
2	Bogardus S. Cairns	Major General; Bogardus S. Cairns (1910–1958)	June 1957	9 December 1958 †	~1 year, 176 days
–	James S. Luckett	Colonel; James S. Luckett (1907–1974); Acting	9 December 1958	16 February 1959	69 days
3	Ernest F. Easterbrook	Major General; Ernest F. Easterbrook (1908–1989)	16 February 1959	March 1962	~3 years, 27 days
4	Robert R. Williams	Brigadier General; Robert R. Williams (1918–2009)	March 1962	August 1963	~1 year, 152 days
5	Clifton F. von Kann	Major General; Clifton F. von Kann (1915–2014)	August 1963	28 February 1965	~1 year, 196 days
6	John J. Tolson III	Major General; John J. Tolson III (1915–1991)	1 March 1965	March 1967	~2 years, 0 days
7	Delk M. Oden	Major General; Delk M. Oden (1911–1997)	March 1967	September 1970	~3 years, 197 days
8	Allen M. Burdett Jr.	Major General; Allen M. Burdett Jr. (1921–1980)	September 1970	31 August 1973	~2 years, 349 days
9	William J. Maddox Jr.	Major General; William J. Maddox Jr. (1921–2001)	1 September 1973	30 June 1976	2 years, 303 days
10	James C. Smith	Major General; James C. Smith (1923–2016)	1 July 1976	December 1978	~2 years, 167 days
11	James H. Merryman	Major General; James H. Merryman (1929–2003)	December 1978	28 July 1980	~1 year, 225 days
12	Carl H. McNair Jr.	Major General; Carl H. McNair Jr. (1933–2022)	28 July 1980	June 1983	~2 years, 322 days
13	Bobby J. Maddox	Major General; Bobby J. Maddox (born 1936)	June 1983	January 1985	~1 year, 213 days
14	Ellis D. Parker	Major General; Ellis D. Parker (1932–2020)	January 1985	September 1989	~4 years, 242 days
15	Rudolph Ostovich III	Major General; Rudolph Ostovich III (born 1941)	September 1989	22 July 1991	~1 year, 309 days
16	John D. Robinson	Major General; John D. Robinson (born 1937)	22 July 1991	28 July 1994	3 years, 6 days
17	Ronald E. Adams	Major General; Ronald E. Adams (born 1943)	28 July 1994	12 September 1996	2 years, 46 days
18	Daniel J. Petrosky	Major General; Daniel J. Petrosky (born 1944)	12 September 1996	23 September 1998	2 years, 11 days
19	Anthony R. Jones	Major General; Anthony R. Jones (born 1948)	23 September 1998	9 August 2001	2 years, 320 days
20	John M. Curran	Major General; John M. Curran (born 1952)	9 August 2001	10 December 2003	2 years, 123 days
21	Edward J. Sinclair	Brigadier General; Edward J. Sinclair (born 1954)	10 December 2003	29 June 2006	2 years, 201 days
22	Virgil L. Packett II	Major General; Virgil L. Packett II	29 June 2006	11 July 2008	2 years, 12 days
23	James O. Barclay III	Major General; James O. Barclay III	11 July 2008	19 August 2010	2 years, 39 days
24	Anthony G. Crutchfield	Major General; Anthony G. Crutchfield (born 1960)	19 August 2010	10 August 2012	1 year, 357 days
25	Kevin W. Mangum	Major General; Kevin W. Mangum (born 1960)	10 August 2012	20 March 2014	1 year, 222 days
26	Michael D. Lundy	Major General; Michael D. Lundy	20 March 2014	6 April 2016	2 years, 17 days
27	William K. Gayler	Major General; William K. Gayler	6 April 2016	17 June 2019	3 years, 72 days
28	David J. Francis	Major General; David J. Francis	17 June 2019	21 July 2022	3 years, 34 days
29	Michael C. McCurry II	Major General; Michael C. McCurry II	21 July 2022	26 July 2024	2 years, 5 days
30	Clair A. Gill	Major General; Clair A. Gill	26 July 2024	26 August 2026	2 years, 31 days
31	Phillip C. Baker	Major General; Phillip C. Baker	26 August 2026	Incumbent	57 days
