= Soc Trang Airfield =

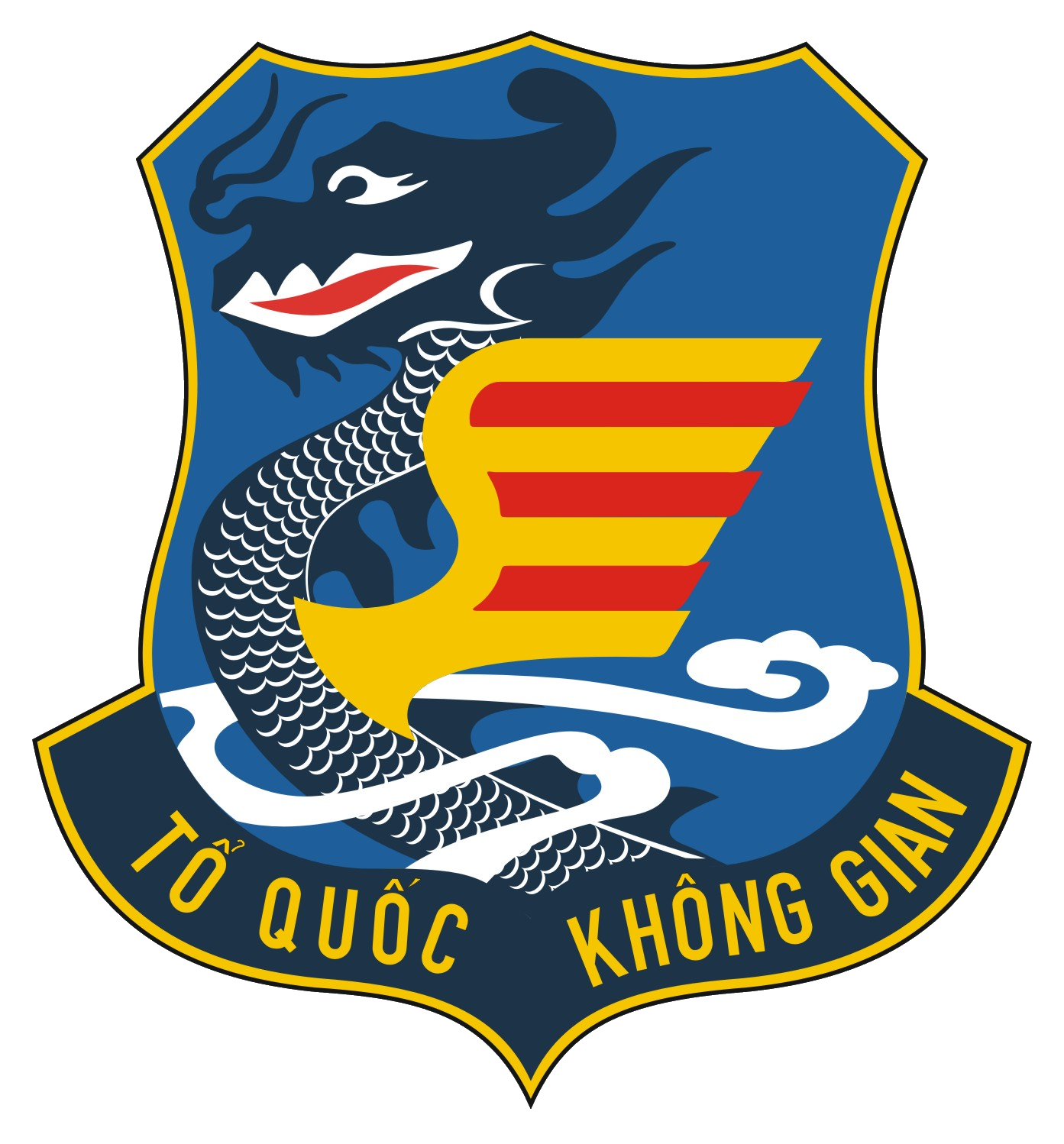
Sóc Trăng Airfield
- Sóc Trăng, Sóc Trăng Province in South Vietnam
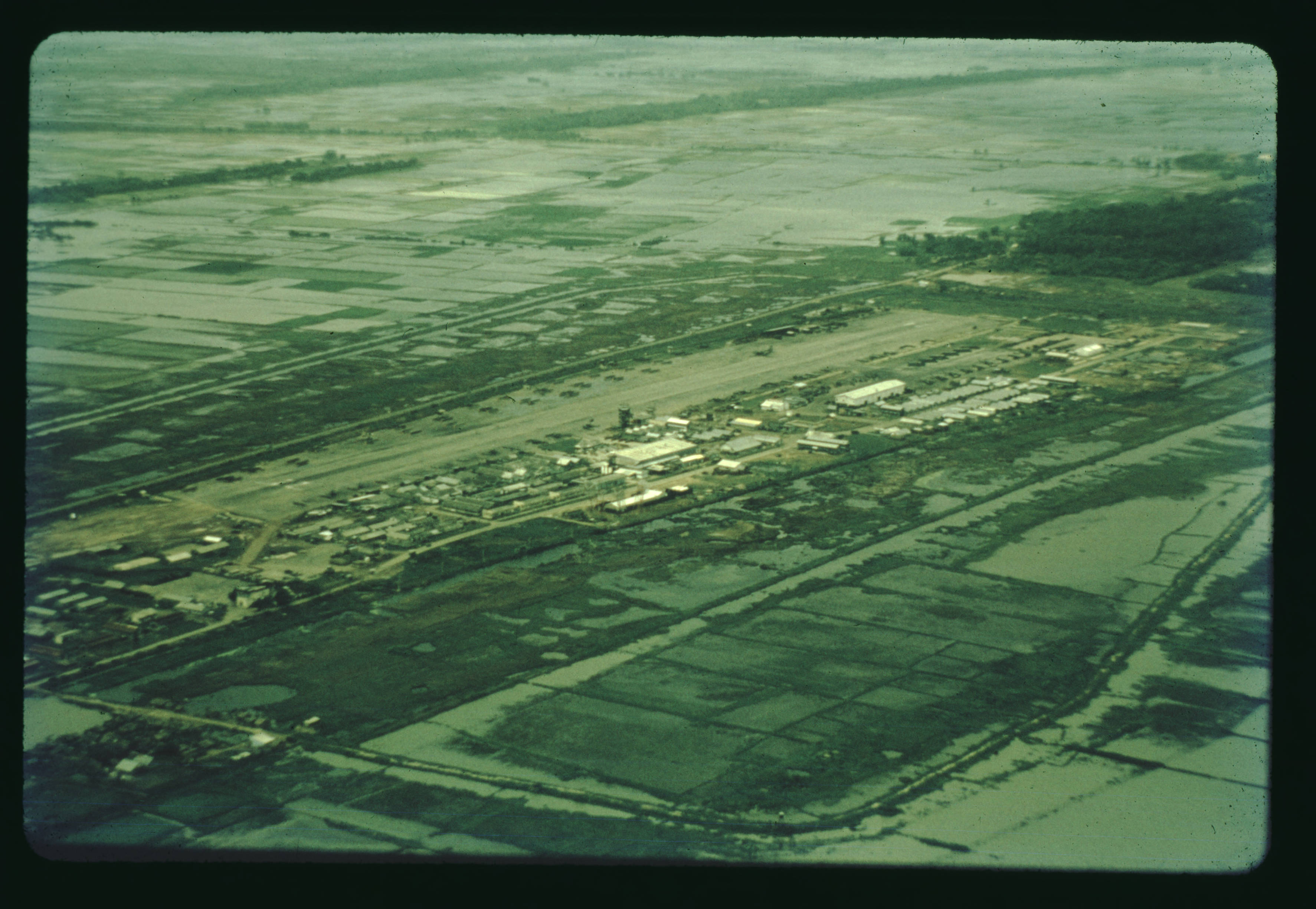
- Sóc Trăng Airfield, 28 July 1968

Site information
- Owner: Army of the Republic of Vietnam
- Operator: United States Marine Corps (USMC); United States Army (US Army)

Location
- Coordinates: 09.58°N 105.959°E

Site history
- Built: 1940
- In use: 1940-1975
- Battles/wars: Vietnam War

Airfield information
- Identifiers: IATA: SOA
- Elevation: 10 feet (3 m) AMSL
Runways
Direction	Length and surface
03/21	3,200 feet (975 m) Asphalt

Sóc Trăng Airfield was a French colonial, Imperial Japanese Army, United States Marine Corps (USMC), United States Army (US ARMY) and Army of the Republic of Vietnam (ARVN) and Republic of Vietnam Air Force (RVNAF) base located in Sóc Trăng in southern Vietnam.

== History ==
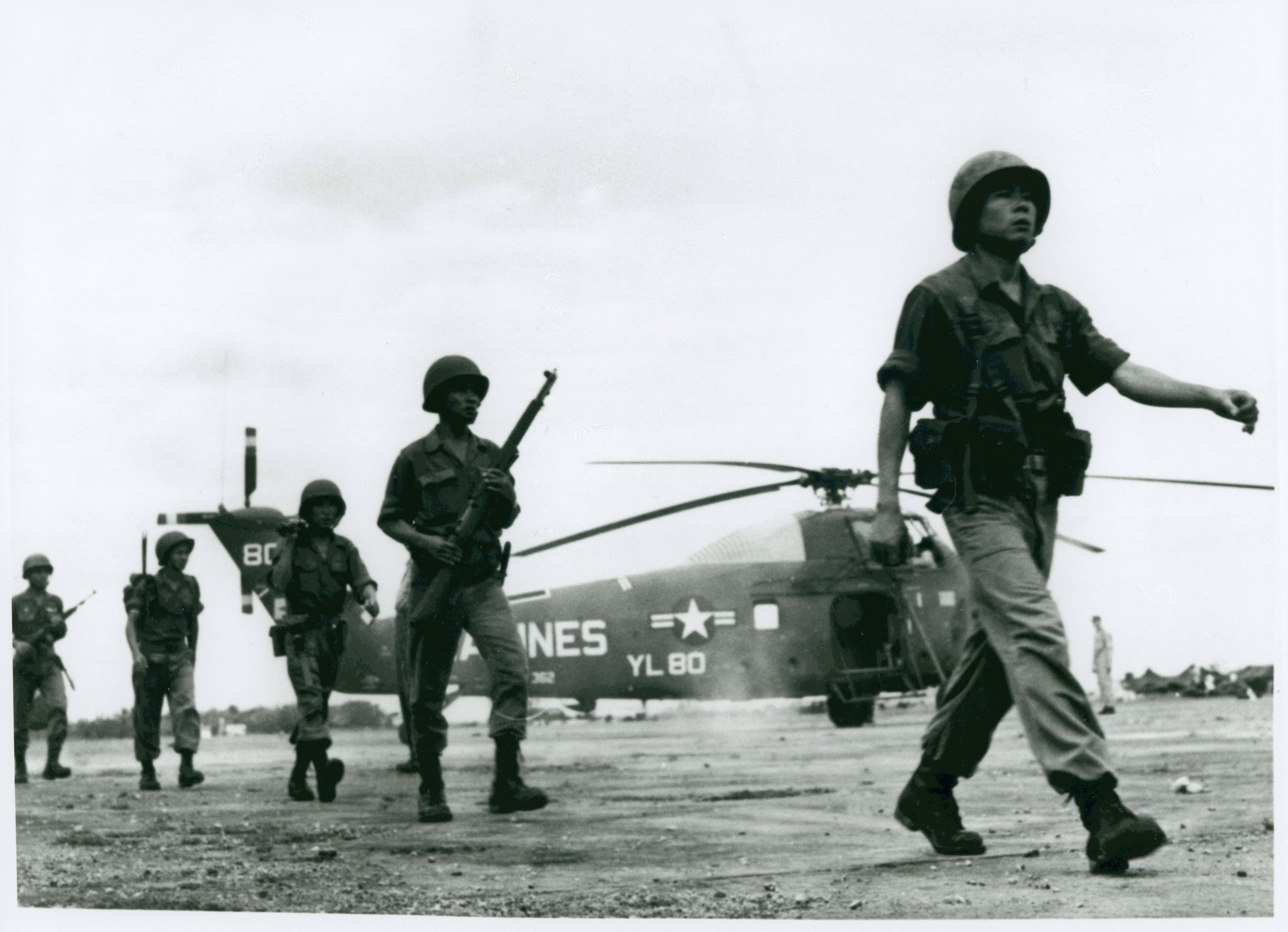
Vietnamese troops with an HMM-362 UH-34

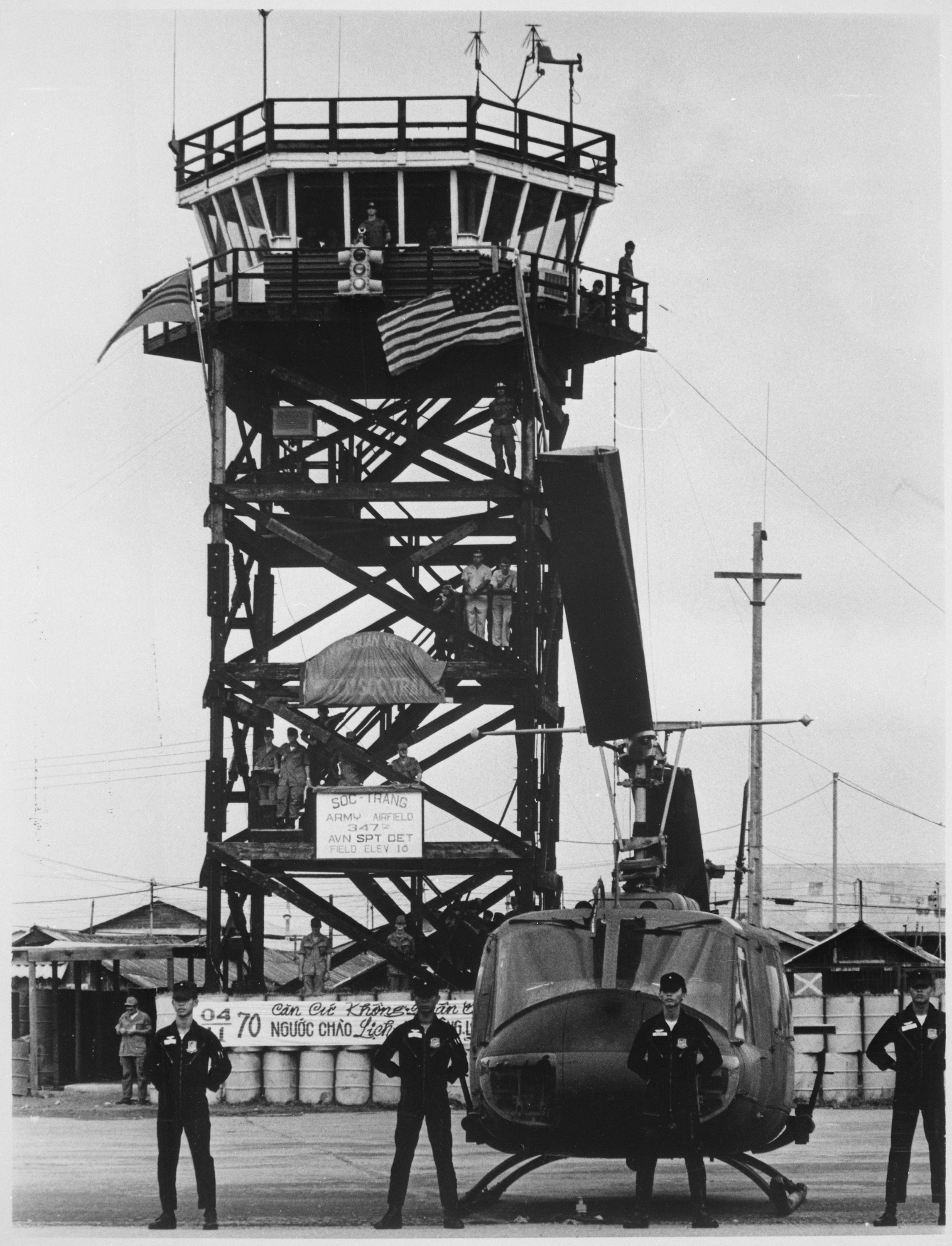
Transfer ceremony, 4 November 1970

Sóc Trăng Airfield was originally established in the French colonial era, it was subsequently used by the Japanese forces from 1940 to 1945.

HMM-362 with Sikorsky UH-34s codenamed Operation Shufly was the first USMC helicopter unit to serve in Vietnam arriving on 15 April 1962. Sóc Trăng was selected for the deployment because it had one of the few hard-surfaced runways in South Vietnam. HMM-362's mission was to provide transport and resupply for ARVN units throughout the Mekong Delta. On 1 August HMM-163 replaced HMM-362. In early September HMM-163 began moving north to Da Nang Air Base, completing the redeployment by 20 September.

Other units stationed at Sóc Trăng included:

- 93d Transportation Company from June 1962 to 23 June 1963
- 121st Aviation Company (Airmobile Light) from 23 June 1963. The 121st Aviation Company was activated using the personnel and equipment of the 93d Transportation Company, which was simultaneously inactivated.
- 336th Assault Helicopter Company
- Detachment A, 57th Medical Detachment (Helicopter Ambulance) (Provisional) with Bell UH-1B Hueys from March 1964.
- 82nd Medical Detachment (Helicopter Ambulance) from October 1964 to 15 March 1969

On 4 November 1970, the control of Sóc Trăng was passed to the RVNAF.

== Accidents and incidents ==
- On 19 May 1967, two UH-1D Iroquois (#64-13521 and #66-01154) of the 336th AHC collided on approach to Sóc Trăng causing both helicopters to crash killing all 4 crewmen on one helicopter and 1 crewman on the other
- On 12 August 1972, Lockheed C-130E Hercules #62-1853 of the 776th Tactical Airlift Squadron was shot down on takeoff from Sóc Trăng, killing 30 of 44 passengers and crew on board

== Current use ==
The airfield remains visible on satellite images.
