= List of transportation units of the United States Army =

This list does not include the 3 historic companies from Massachusetts 1058 1166 1060th This is a List of transportation units of the United States Army from the Transportation Corps.

== Brigades ==
| Insignia | Brigade | Affiliation | HQ Location | Years active | Notes |
|---|---|---|---|---|---|
| | 3rd Transportation Brigade | 377th Theater Sustainment Command | Army Reserve | 4 May 1966 – Present | |
| | 4th Transportation Brigade | U.S. Army Europe (USAREUR) | Camp King, Oberursel West Germany | 1975-1981 | Inactive |
| | 7th Transportation Brigade | 3rd Sustainment Command (Expeditionary) | Joint Base Langley–Eustis (VA) | 1 October 1978 – Present | |
| 8th Transportation Brigade DUI | 8th Transportation Brigade | U.S. Army Transportation School | Fort Eustis | 1986-2010 | Inactive |
| | 107th Transportation Brigade | Seventh Army | Ludwigsburg, West Germany | 1965-1990 | Inactive The brigade was a unit of the US Army in Europe from June 1965 under the COSTAR II reorganization. The Brigade was responsible for command and control, air transport, motor transport, terminal transfer and transportation movement in Seventh Army. The unit was a part of 7th Field Army Support Command (FASCOM) which was inactivated on October 1, 1990. |
| | 143rd Transportation Brigade | | Orlando, Florida | 1968-1985 | Inactive |
| | 184th Transportation Brigade | | | | Is Now 184th Sustainment Command Mississippi National Guard |
| | 319th Transportation Brigade | 364th Expeditionary Sustainment Command | Camp Parks, Dublin, California | 2024-present | |
| | 425th Transportation Brigade | FORSCOM | Fort Sheridan, Illinois | 1945-1990s(?) | Inactive |
| | 595th Transportation Brigade | U.S. Army Transportation Command | Camp Arifjan, Kuwait | 2010-present | CENTCOM |
| | 596th Transportation Brigade | U.S. Army Transportation Command | Military Ocean Terminal Sunny Point (NC) | 2009-present | ARTRANS |
| | 597th Transportation Brigade | U.S. Army Transportation Command | Joint Base Langley–Eustis (VA) | 2010-present | ARTRANS |
| | 598th Transportation Surface Brigade | U.S. Army Transportation Command | Sembach Kaserne, Germany | | EUCOM/USAFRICOM |
| | 599th Transportation Brigade | U.S. Army Transportation Command | Wheeler Army Airfield (HI) | 1986-present | PACOM |
| | 1179th Transportation Brigade | U.S. Army Transportation Command | Fort Hamilton (NY) | 1997-present | Army Reserve |
| | 1189th Transportation Brigade | U.S. Army Transportation Command | North Charleston (SC) | 1997-present | Army Reserve |
| | 1190th Transportation Brigade | U.S. Army Transportation Command | Baton Rouge (LA) | | Army Reserve |
| | 1394th Transportation Brigade | U.S. Army Transportation Command | Marine Corps Base Camp Pendleton (CA) | | Army Reserve |

== Battalions ==
Transportation Motor Transport Battalion

The transportation motor transport battalion is designed to support the movement of personnel and matériel for divisions and corps in an area of operation. It is normally attached to a sustainment brigade and consists of a headquarters and headquarters detachment providing command and control of between three and seven motor transport companies, detachments or teams.

Movement Control Battalion

The movement control battalion is charged with regulating all movement within its area of operation, including along the main supply route (MSR) and alternate supply routes (ASR). Subordinate to the Theater Sustainment Command and/or Expeditionary Sustainment Command, it is a vital component in the planning and execution of deployment, redeployment and distribution operations. The battalion exercises control of between four and ten movement control teams, which are assigned to key areas or transportation nodes.

| Insignia | Battalion | Subordinate to | Affiliation | HQ Location | Years active | Notes |
|---|---|---|---|---|---|---|
| | 6th Transportation Battalion | 7th Transportation Brigade | | | Inactive | |
| | 7th Transportation Battalion | 82nd Sustainment Brigade | | | Inactive | |
| | 10th Transportation Battalion | 7th Transportation Brigade | | Fort Eustis | | |
| | 11th Transportation Battalion | 7th Transportation Brigade | | Fort Eustis | | |
| | 14th Transportation Battalion | 21st Theater Sustainment Command | | | Inactive | |
| | 24th Transportation Battalion | 7th Sustainment Brigade | | | Inactive | |
| | 25th Movement Control Battalion | 19th Expeditionary Sustainment Command | | Camp Carroll, South Korea | | |
| | 31st Transportation Battalion | 24th Infantry Division (United States) | | Will Kaserne, Germany | Inactive | In 1957, reflagged from the 42nd AAA Battalion. |
| | 39th Movement Control Battalion | 21st Theater Sustainment Command | | Germany | | |
| | 45th Transportation Battalion | | | | Inactive | In 1963 changed to 145th Aviation Battalion. |
| | 49th Transportation Battalion | 13th Expeditionary Sustainment Command | | Fort Cavazos | | |
| | 53rd Movement Control Battalion | 7th Transportation Brigade | | Fort Eustis | Inactive | |
| | 57th Transportation Battalion | 593rd Expeditionary Sustainment Command | | | Inactive | |
| | 58th Transportation Battalion | 3rd Chemical Brigade | | Fort Leonard Wood | | |
| | 71st Transportation Battalion | U.S. Army Transportation School | | Fort Gregg-Adams | | |
| | 106th Transportation Battalion | 101st Sustainment Brigade | | | Inactive | |
| | 112th Transportation Battalion | | Ohio Army National Guard | North Canton (OH) | | |
| | 164th Transportation Battalion | | Massachusetts Army National Guard | Dorchester (MA) | | |
| | 180th Transportation Battalion | 4th Sustainment Brigade | | | Inactive | |
| | 220th Transportation Battalion | | Missouri Army National Guard | Fredericktown (MO) | | |
| | 228th Transportation Battalion | | Pennsylvania Army National Guard | Fort Indiantown Gap (PA) | | |
| | 246th Transportation Battalion | 272nd Regional Support Group | Michigan Army National Guard | Jackson (MI) | | |
| | 254th Transportation Battalion | | Florida Army National Guard | West Palm Beach (FL) | | |
| | 257th Movement Control Battalion | 641st Regional Support Group | Army Reserve | Gainesville (FL) | | |
| | 313th Movement Control Battalion | 55th Sustainment Brigade | Army Reserve | Baltimore (MD) | | |
| | 314th Transportation Battalion | | Army Reserve | | Inactive | |
| | 330th Transportation Battalion | 3rd Sustainment Command (Expeditionary) | | Fort Bragg | | |
| | 332nd Transportation Battalion | 641st Regional Support Group | Army Reserve | Tampa (FL) | | |
| | 346th Transportation Battalion | 166th Regional Support Group | Army Reserve | Roosevelt Roads Naval Station (PR) | | |
| | 354th Movement Control Battalion | 77th Sustainment Brigade | Army Reserve | Fort Totten (NY) | | |
| | 385th Transportation Battalion | 654th Regional Support Group | Army Reserve | Tacoma (WA) | | |
| | 419th Movement Control Battalion | 321st Sustainment Brigade | Army Reserve | Peoria (IL) | | |
| | 420th Movement Control Battalion | | Army Reserve | Sherman Oaks (CA) | | |
| | 436th Movement Control Battalion | 77th Sustainment Brigade | Army Reserve | Staten Island (NY) | | |
| | 446th Movement Control Battalion | 510th Regional Support Group | Army Reserve | Los Angeles (CA) | | |
| | 450th Movement Control Battalion | 561st Regional Support Group | Army Reserve | Manhattan (KS) | | |
| | 457th Transportation Battalion | 644 Regional Support Group | Army Reserve | Fort Snelling (MN) | | |
| | 462nd Movement Control Battalion | 77th Sustainment Brigade | Army Reserve | Trenton (NJ) | | |
| | 470th Movement Control Battalion | 649 Regional Support Group | Army Reserve | Elwood (IL) | | |
| | 483rd Transportation Battalion | 650th Regional Support Group | Army Reserve | Vallejo (CA) | | |
| | 484th Movement Control Battalion | 89th Sustainment Brigade | Army Reserve | Springfield (MO) | | |
| | 615th Transportation Battalion | 111th Sustainment Brigade | New Mexico Army National Guard | Springer City (NM) | | |
| | 718th Transportation Battalion | 643rd Regional Support Group | Army Reserve | Columbus (OH) | | |
| | 719th Movement Control Battalion | 655 Regional Support Group | Army Reserve | Brockton (MA) | | |
| | 729th Transportation Battalion | 163rd Regional Support Group | Army Reserve | Grafenwöhr, Germany | | |
| | 757th Transportation Battalion (Rail) | 643rd Regional Support Group | Army Reserve | Milwaukee (WI) | Inactivated 2016 | |
| | 766th Transportation Battalion | 643rd Regional Support Group | Army Reserve | South Bend (IN) | | |
| | 812th Transportation Battalion | 207th Regional Support Group | Army Reserve | Charlotte (NC) | | |
| | 821st Transportation Battalion | 561st Regional Support Group | Army Reserve | Topeka (KS) | | |
| | 828th Transportation Battalion | 642nd Regional Support Group | Army Reserve | Livingston (AL) | | |
| | 831st Transportation Battalion | 595th Transportation Brigade | | Manama (Bahrain) | | |
| | 832nd Transportation Battalion | 597th Transportation Brigade | | Joint Base Langley–Eustis (VA) | | |
| | 833rd Transportation Battalion | 596th Transportation Brigade | | Joint Base Lewis-McChord (WA) | | |
| | 834th Transportation Battalion | 596th Transportation Brigade | | Concord (CA) | | |
| | 835th Transportation Battalion | 599th Transportation Brigade | | Okinawa (Japan) | | |
| | 836th Transportation Battalion | 599th Transportation Brigade | | Yokohama (Japan) | | |
| | 837th Transportation Battalion | 599th Transportation Brigade | | Busan (South Korea) | | |
| | 838th Transportation Battalion | 598th Transportation Brigade | | Kaiserslautern (Germany) | | |
| | 839th Transportation Battalion | 598th Transportation Brigade | | Livorno (Italy) | | |
| | 840th Transportation Battalion | 595th Transportation Brigade | | Camp Arifjan (Kuwait) | | |
| | 841st Transportation Battalion | 597th Transportation Brigade | | North Charleston (SC) | | |
| | 842nd Transportation Battalion | 597th Transportation Brigade | | Beaumont (TX) | | |
| | 1030th Transportation Battalion | | Virginia Army National Guard | Gate City (VA) | | |
| | 1050th Transportation Battalion | | South Carolina Army National Guard | Newberry (SC) | | |
| | 1120th Transportation Battalion | | Arizona Army National Guard | Glendale (AZ) | | |
| | 1144th Transportation Battalion | | Illinois Army National Guard | | Inactive | |
| | 1173th Deployment and Distribution Support Battalion | 1189th Transportation Brigade | Army Reserve | Brockton (MA) | | |
| | 1174th Deployment and Distribution Support Battalion | 1179th Transportation Brigade | Army Reserve | Fort Totten (NY) | | |
| | 1181st Deployment and Distribution Support Battalion | 1190th Transportation Brigade | Army Reserve | Meridian (MS) | | |
| | 1182nd Deployment and Distribution Support Battalion | 1189th Transportation Brigade | Army Reserve | North Charleston (SC) | | |
| | 1184th Deployment and Distribution Support Battalion | 1190th Transportation Brigade | Army Reserve | Mobile (AL) | | |
| | 1185th Deployment and Distribution Support Battalion | 1179th Transportation Brigade | Army Reserve | Lancaster (PA) | | |
| | 1186th Deployment and Distribution Support Battalion | 1189th Transportation Brigade | Army Reserve | Jacksonville (FL) | | |
| | 1188th Deployment and Distribution Support Battalion | 1189th Transportation Brigade | Army Reserve | Decatur (GA) | | |
| | 1192nd Deployment and Distribution Support Battalion | 1190th Transportation Brigade | Army Reserve | New Orleans (LA) | | |
| | 1395th Deployment and Distribution Support Battalion | 1394th Transportation Brigade | Army Reserve | Joint Base Lewis-McChord (WA) | | |
| | 1397th Deployment and Distribution Support Battalion | 1394th Transportation Brigade | Army Reserve | Vallejo (CA) | | |
| | 1398th Deployment and Distribution Support Battalion | 1179th Transportation Brigade | Army Reserve | Baltimore (MD) | | |

== Companies ==
=== Motor Transport Company ===
Motor transport companies provide for the transport of personnel and a variety of commodities, including petroleum products, bulk cargo, and containers. They normally operate as part of a transportation battalion, a Combat Sustainment Support Battalion (CSSB) or Division Sustainment Support Battalion (DSSB). There are four basic types of motor companies:

==== Light-Medium Truck Company ====
The light-medium truck company provides for transportation of bulk cargo, containers and personnel using the Family of Medium Tactical Vehicles (FMTV). It may operate as part of a motor transport battalion, a CSSB or a DSSB. It consists of a headquarters platoon, a light-medium truck platoon, a medium truck platoon, and a maintenance section. Vehicle complement comprises 50 medium tactical vehicle cargo trucks, including the M1078 and M1083 variants, along with 25 trailers of the same payload capacity; and 10 M1088 medium tactical vehicle tractor trucks with 20 M871 trailers. Its total one-time lift capability is 225 short tons of breakbulk cargo; 404 short tons of breakbulk ammunition; 440 pallets; 10 TEU; or 600 personnel with gear.

==== Medium Truck Company ====
Medium truck companies come in six different varieties, whether they provide for the transport of general cargo, petroleum products, or containers. Their organization is the same, with a headquarters platoon, three medium truck platoons, and a maintenance section.

===== PLS Truck Company =====
The Palletized Load System is designed to provide ground transportation for dry and refrigerated containers with a container roll-in/roll-out platform (CROP) or other types of cargo on PLS flatracks. When equipped with tank racks or load handling system compatible water tank racks (HIPPOs) it can also transport bulk petroleum products or water. Standard complement is 60 PLS trucks, 60 PLS trailers, and 360 flatracks or CROPs, giving it a one-time lift capability of 421 short tons of breakbulk cargo; 757 short tons of breakbulk ammunition; 960 pallets; 120 TEU; 240,000 gallons of bulk water; or 300,000 gallons of bulk fuel.

===== Medium Truck Company Cargo =====
The medium truck company cargo is designed to provide transport for containerized and non-containerized cargo, including palletized bulk water or refrigerated cargo. Two types of medium truck cargo companies exist. The first is composed of 60 M915 series tractor trucks and 120 M872 40 ft semitrailers, generally used for line haul operations but also capable of local operations. In addition to handling dry or refrigerated cargo, the trailer can be fitted with a mounted fabric tank to transport 4,750 gallons of water or a HIPPO carrying 2,000 gallons along with integrated pump, engine and hose reel. Its one-time lift capability is 447 short tons of breakbulk cargo; 803 short tons of ammunition; 1,080 pallets, 120 TEU, 247,200 gallons of using fabric tanks; or 240,000 gallons of water using HIPPOs. The second comprises 60 M1088 medium tactical vehicle tractor trucks with 120 M871 trailers, with a one-time lift capability of 288 short tons of breakbulk cargo; 517 short tons of breakbulk ammunition; 840 pallets; 60 TEU; or 180,000 gallons of water using fabric tanks or HIPPOs.

===== Medium Truck Company POL =====
The medium truck company POL's mission is the transport of petroleum, oil, and lubricant (POL) products to distribution points. Three different types of POL companies exist. The medium truck company POL (7.5k) EAB Line Haul provides for line haul transportation of bulk fuel, consisting of 60 M915 trucks with 60 7.5k trailers with a total transport capacity of 450,000 gallons. The medium truck company POL (5k) Line Haul is equipped with 60 M915 tractor trucks and 60 5k trailers for a total transport capacity of 300,000 gallons. The medium truck company POL (5k) EAB Tactical provides both line haul and local operations, utilizing 60 M1088 tractor trucks and 60 M967 5k trailers with a total transport capacity of 300,000 gallons.

==== Heavy Truck Company ====
The mission of the Heavy Equipment Transport System (HET) company is the port clearance, tactical movement and recovery of heavy maneuver forces. Operating as part of a transportation battalion or CSSB, it consists of a headquarter platoon, four HET platoons, and a maintenance platoon. Vehicle compliment includes 96 HET systems, each comprising a M1070 truck tractor and M1000 semitrailer. The company is also equipped with medium equipment trailers design to transport loads 60 tons or less.

==== Composite Truck Company ====
Composite truck companies provide tailored support to division and corps elements with a combination of FMTV and PLS trucks. The composite truck company (heavy) provides support for armored divisions and consists of a headquarters platoon, a medium tactical vehicle platoon for 20 FMTVs, two PLS platoons for 40 PLS trucks and trailers, a HET platoon for 18 HET systems, and a maintenance section. The composite truck company (light) is designed to support light divisions and has the same composition minus the HET platoon. Both types of companies also include 20 MRAP vehicles.

| Company | Part of Battalion | Affiliation | HQ Location | Detachment Location(s) | Years active | Notes |
|---|---|---|---|---|---|---|
| 8th | 45th Transportation Battalion / 52nd Aviation Battalion | | Fort Bragg | | -1963 | (Light Helicopter). CH-21C. In 1963 became 117th Aviation Company (Airmobile Light). |
| 33rd | 45th Transportation Battalion | | | | -1963 | (Light Helicopter). CH-21C.In 1963 became 118th Aviation Company (Airmobile Light). |
| 57th | 45th Transportation Battalion / 52nd Aviation Battalion | | Fort Lewis | | -1963 | (Light Helicopter). CH-21C.In 1963 became 120th Aviation Company (Airmobile Light). |
| 81st | 45th Transportation Battalion | | | | -1963 | (Light Helicopter). CH-21C.In 1963 became 119th Aviation Company (Airmobile Light). |
| 93rd | 45th Transportation Battalion / 52nd Aviation Battalion | | | | -1963 | (Light Helicopter). CH-21C.In 1963 became 121st Aviation Company (Airmobile Light). |
| 114th | 347th Regional Support Group | MN ARNG | Duluth | Chisholm | | |
| 139th | | KS ARNG | | | | |
| 144th | 927th Combat Service Support Battalion | FL ARNG | Marianna, Florida | | | |
| 222nd | 1120th Transportation Battalion | AZ ARNG | Florence Military Reservation | | | |
| 224th | | MN ARNG | Austin | | | |
| 339th | | | | | | (Direct Support).Sikorsky CH-37B Mojave. |
| 458th | | | | | | |
| 593rd | 17th Special Troops Battalion | NV ARNG | Las Vegas | | | |
| 611th | | | | | | (Aircraft Direct Support). CH-37B Mojave. |
| 1048th | 143d Combat Service Support Battalion | CT ARNG | Stratford, CT | | 2002- | |
| 1049th | | DE ARNG | Seaford | | | |
| 1136th | | ME ARNG | Bangor | Sanford; Calais | | |
| 1160th | | GA ARNG | Rome | | | Brand new unit, no relation to underneath unit. |
| 1160th | | GA ARNG | | | 1970s-2006 | Became Company B, 1st Battalion, 169th General Support Aviation Battalion in 2006. |
| 1148th | | GA ARNG | Fort Gordon | | | |
| 1218th | 254th Transportation Battalion | FL ARNG | | | | |
| 1230th | | GA ARNG | Thomasville | | | |
| 1404th | 1120th Transportation Battalion | AZ ARNG | Bellemont | Show Low | | |
| 1460th | | MI ARNG | Midland | | | |
| 1461st | | MI ARNG | Jackson | Augusta | | |
| 1462nd | | MI ARNG | Howell | | | |
| 1463rd | | MI ARNG | Wyoming | Sturgis | | |
| 1687th | 298th Support Battalion | MS ARNG | | | | (Medium Truck). |
| 1859th | 757th Combat Sustainment Support Battalion | NV ARNG | | | | |
| 1864th | 17th Special Troops Battalion | NV ARNG | | | | |
| 2220th | 1120th Transportation Battalion | AZ ARNG | Tucson | Douglas | | |

=== Detachments ===
| Insignia | Detachment | Part of | Affiliation | HQ Location | Detachment Location | Years active | Notes |
|---|---|---|---|---|---|---|---|
| | 80th Transportation Detachment | | | | | | |
| | 98th Transportation Detachment | | | | | | |
| | 140th Transportation Detachment | | | | | | |
| | 150th Transportation Detachment | | | | | | |
| | 151st Transportation Detachment | | | | | | |
| | 165th Transportation Detachment | | | | | | |
| | 166th Transportation Detachment | | | | | | |
| | 171st Transportation Detachment | | | | | | |
| | 255th Transportation Detachment | | | | | | |
| | 256th Transportation Detachment | | | | | | |
| | 329th Transportation Detachment | | | | | | |
| | 390th Transportation Detachment | | | | | | |
| | 391st Transportation Detachment | | | | | | |
| | 392nd Transportation Detachment | | | | | | |
| | 393rd Transportation Detachment | | | | | | |
| | 394th Transportation Detachment | | | | | | |
| | 398th Transportation Detachment | 11th Armored Cavalry Regiment | | | | | |
| | 400th Transportation Detachment | | | | | | |
| | 402nd Transportation Detachment | | | | | | |
| | 403rd Transportation Detachment | | | | | | |
| | 405th Transportation Detachment | | | | | | |
| | 407th Transportation Detachment | | | | | | |
| | 408th Transportation Detachment | | | | | | |
| | 409th Transportation Detachment | | | | | | |
| | 411th Transportation Detachment | | | | | | |
| | 483rd Transportation Detachment | | | | | | |
| | 484th Transportation Detachment | | | | | | |
| | 544th Transportation Detachment | | | | | | |
| | 545th Transportation Detachment | | | | | | |
| | 571st Transportation Detachment | | | | | | |
| | 573rd Transportation Detachment | | | | | | |
| | 598th Transportation Detachment | | | | | | |
| | 602nd Transportation Detachment | | | | | | |
| | 603rd Transportation Detachment | | | | | | |
| | 604th Transportation Detachment | | | | | | |
| | 605th Transportation Detachment | | | | | | |
| | 606th Transportation Detachment | | | | | | (Petrol Liaison) |
| | 610th Transportation Detachment | | | | | | |
| | 611th Transportation Detachment | | | | | | |
| | 619th Transportation Detachment | | | | | | |
| | 647th Transportation Detachment | | | | | | |
