= 145th Aviation Regiment =

- Active: 1964–
- Country: United States
- Branch: United States Army
- Type: Aviation Regiment
- Part of: 1st Aviation Brigade
- Garrison/HQ: Fort Rucker

145th Aviation Regiment is an aviation regiment of the United States Army. It was previously the 145th Combat Aviation Battalion which was operational during the Vietnam War under the control of the 12th Combat Aviation Group.

== History ==
- HQ & HQ Company at Bien Hoa from sometime between November 1966 and January 1967
- 145th Security Platoon at Bien Hoa from sometime between November 1966 and January 1967
- 87th Quartermaster Detachment (PETRL) at Bien Hoa from sometime between November 1966 and January 1967
- 68th Assault Helicopter Company at Bien Hoa from 17 July 1966
  - 391st Transportation Detachment (KD) at Bien Hoa from sometime between November 1966 and January 1967
  - 282nd Signal Detachment (RL) at Bien Hoa from sometime between November 1966 and January 1967
  - 430th Medical Detachment (OA) at Bien Hoa from sometime between November 1966 and January 1967
- 117th Assault Helicopter Company at Bien Hoa from 1 January 1968 until sometime between February 1970 and April 1970
  - 140th Transportation Detachment (KD) at Bien Hoa from 1 January 1968
  - 256th Signal Detachment (RL) at Bien Hoa from 1 January 1968
- 118th Assault Helicopter Company at Bien Hoa
  - 573rd Transportation Detachment (KD) at Bien Hoa
  - 198th Signal Detachment (RL) at Bien Hoa
- 190th Assault Helicopter Company at Bien Hoa from 8 September 1967
  - 605th Transportation Detachment (KD) at Bien Hoa from 1967
  - 520th Medical Detachment (OA) at Bien Hoa from 1967
- 334th Aviation Company (Armed)/(Assault Helicopter)/(Aerial Weapons Company) at Bien Hoa from sometime between February and April 1967
  - 571st Transportation Detachment (KD) at Bien Hoa
  - 320th Signal Detachment (RL) at Phu Loi

== Current structure ==
- 1st Battalion
  - A Company
  - B Company
  - D Company
