= 6th Transportation Battalion (United States) =

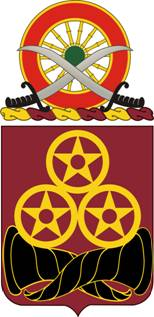
- Coat of arms
- Active: 1943 – 1949; 1952 – 1972; 1979 – 2012
- Country: United States
- Branch: United States Army
- Role: Transportation
- Size: Battalion
- Part of: 7th Transportation Brigade
- Garrison/HQ: Fort Eustis, Virginia (1979–2012)

Insignia
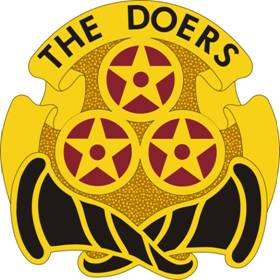
- Distinctive unit insignia

The 6th Transportation Battalion is a transportation battalion of the United States Army first constituted in 1943. The 6th Transportation Battalion has participated in World War II, the Vietnam War, Operation Desert Storm, and Operation New Dawn.

The battalion's inactivation ceremony was held on 28 August 2012.

== Operation New Dawn 2011–12 ==
The battalion returned from a one-year deployment to Kuwait in March/April 2012.

== Lineage ==
Constituted 17 June 1943 in the Army of the United States as Headquarters and Headquarters Detachment, 6th Quartermaster Troop Transport Battalion

Activated 26 August 1943 at Fort Devens, Massachusetts

Reorganized and re-designated 20 November 1943 as Headquarters and Headquarters Detachment, 6th Quartermaster Battalion, Mobile

Converted and re-designated 1 August 1946 as Headquarters and Headquarters Detachment, 6th Transportation Corps Truck Battalion

Re-designated 22 April 1947 as Headquarters and Headquarters Detachment, 6th Transportation Truck Battalion

Inactivated 19 January 1949 in Germany

Re-designated 16 July 1952 as Headquarters and Headquarters Company, 6th Transportation Truck Battalion, and allotted to the Regular Army

Activated 15 August 1952 at Fort Eustis, Virginia

Reorganized and re-designated 20 February 1959 as Headquarters and Headquarters Detachment, 6th Transportation Battalion

Inactivated 14 June 1972 at Oakland Army Base, California

Activated 16 March 1979 at Fort Eustis, Virginia

== Campaign participation credit ==
World War II: Northern France; Rhineland; Central Europe

Vietnam: Counteroffensive, Phase II; Counteroffensive, Phase III; Tet Counteroffensive; Counteroffensive, Phase IV; Counteroffensive, Phase V; Counteroffensive, Phase VI; Tet 69/Counteroffensive; Summer-Fall 1969; Winter-Spring 1970; Sanctuary Counteroffensive; Counteroffensive, Phase VII; Consolidation I; Consolidation II; Cease-Fire

Southwest Asia: Defense of Saudi Arabia; Liberation and Defense of Kuwait; Cease-Fire

Iraq Campaign

== Decorations ==
- Meritorious Unit Commendation (Army) for VIETNAM 1966–1967
- Meritorious Unit Commendation (Army) for VIETNAM 1968–1969
- Meritorious Unit Commendation (Army) for VIETNAM 1969–1970
- Meritorious Unit Commendation (Army) for SOUTHWEST ASIA
