= 31st Transportation Battalion =

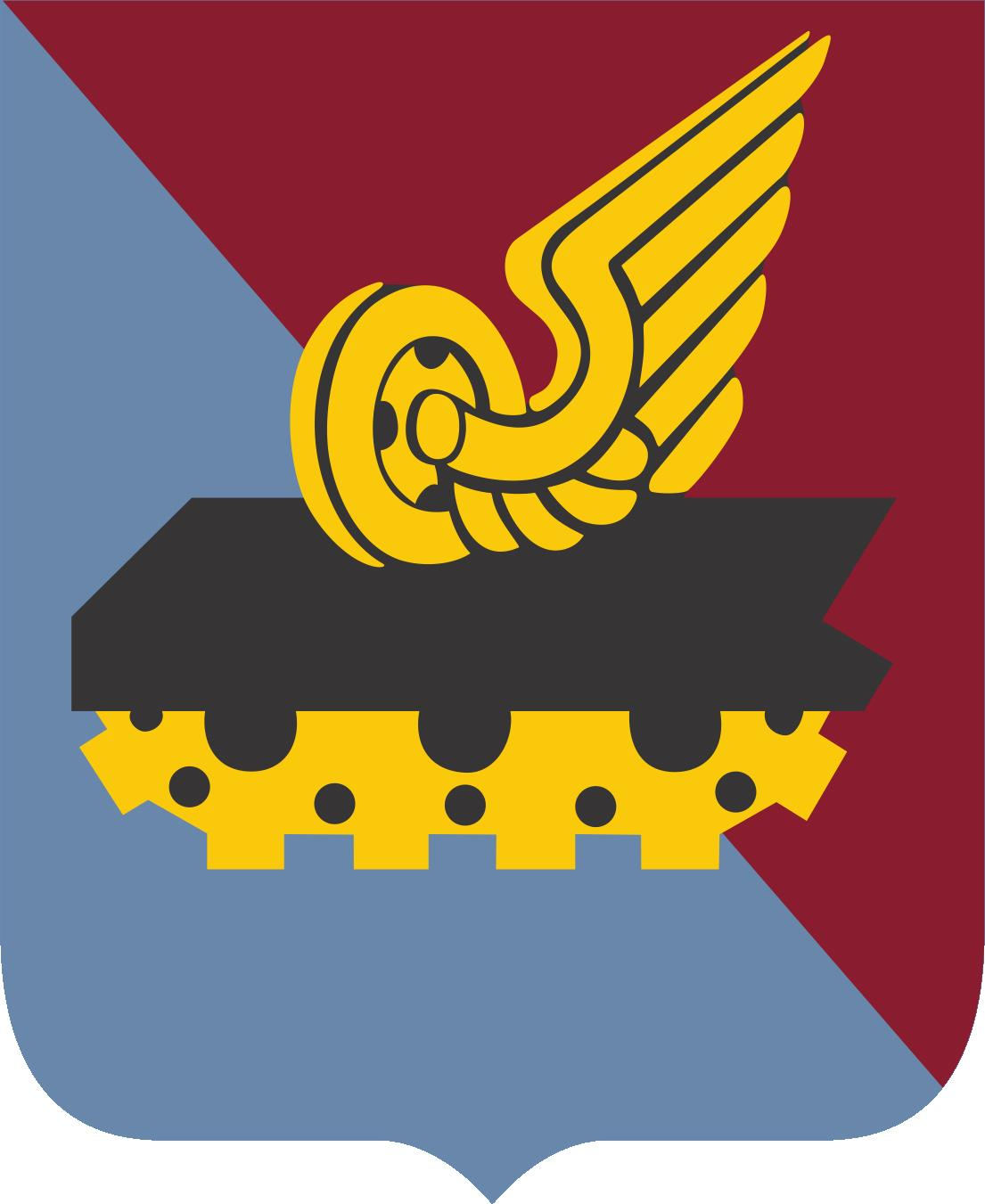
- Coat of Arms
- Active: 1 Dec 1958–30 Jun 1962
- Country: United States
- Branch: United States Army
- Type: Transportation
- Size: Battalion
- Part of: 24th Infantry Division
- Garrison/HQ: Will Kaserne, Germany
- Motto(s): Motus Est Virtus (Mobility Is Power)
- Anniversaries: December 1st
- Equipment: M35 series 2½-ton 6×6 cargo truck; M59 armored personnel carrier; M113 armored personnel carrier

Insignia
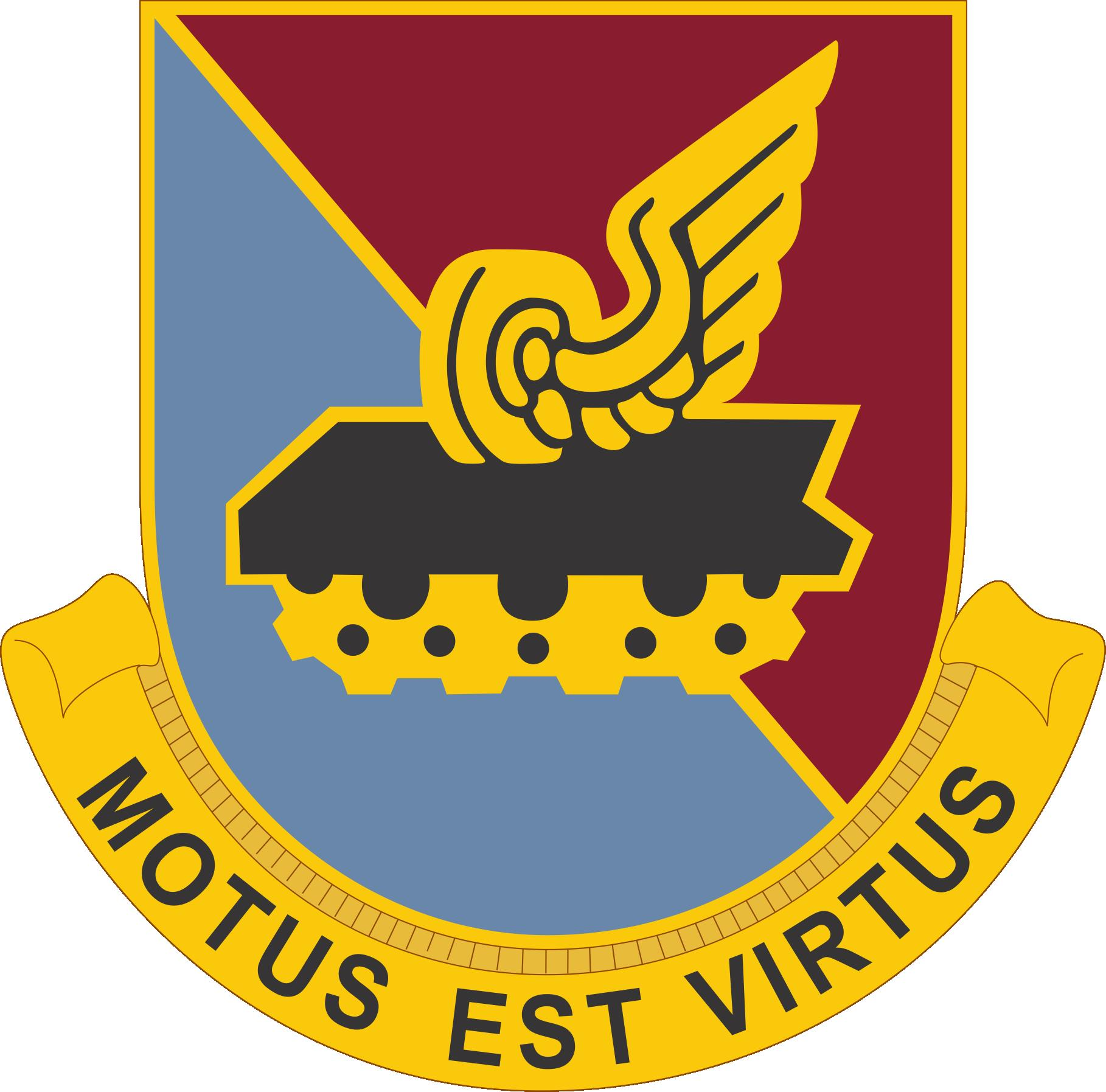
- Distinctive Unit Insignia (DUI)

The 31st Transportation Battalion was a transportation battalion that served under the 24th Infantry Division from 1957 to 1962.

== History ==
The 42nd Anti-aircraft Artillery (AAA) Battalion was reflagged on December 1, 1957, as the 31st Transportation Battalion and was assigned to the 9th Infantry Division stationed at Fort Carson, Colorado. It would have the responsibility of basic training until it was assigned to the reflagged 24th Infantry Division in Jun 1958. The 31st Trans Bn was initially set up as a pentomic transportation battalion which consisted of Company A (2½-ton 6×6 cargo trucks) and Companies B and C (armored personnel carriers). In December 1960, the 31st Trans Bn consisted as follows:

- Headquarters and Headquarters Detachment
- Company A
- Company B
- Company C
- 396th Transportation Company
- 518th Transportation Company
- 533rd Transportation Company
- 596th Transportation Company

Due to the failure of the pentomic division and the restructuring of the US Army to the Reorganization Objective Army Division (ROAD), the 31st Transportation Battalion would become inactivated on June 30, 1962, at Will Kaserne in Munich, Germany.

== Heraldry ==
=== Distinctive Unit Insignia ===
Description

A Gold color metal and enamel device 1 1/8 inches (2.86 cm) in height overall consisting of a shield rounded at the bottom blazoned: Per bend Gules (Brick Red) and Azure (Light Blue) in fess an armored vehicle Sable and Or carrying a winged wheel of the last detailed of the third. Attached below and to the sides of the shield is a Gold scroll inscribed “MOTUS EST VIRTUS” in Black letters.

Symbolism

The colors brick red and golden yellow are used for the Transportation Corps. The light blue symbolizes the unit's assignment to provide mobility to the Infantry Division. The armored vehicle and winged wheel refer to the type of vehicle used and the mobility function. The motto is based on the Chief of Staff's description of the mission of the Transportation Corps and translates to “Mobility is Power.”

Background

The distinctive unit insignia was approved on 21 November 1958.

=== Coat of Arms ===
Blazon

Shield

Per bend Gules (Brick Red) and Azure (Light Blue) in fess an armored vehicle Sable and Or carrying a winged wheel of the last detailed of the third.

Crest

None. Motto

MOTUS EST VIRTUS (Mobility Is Power).

Symbolism

Shield

The colors brick red and golden yellow are used for the Transportation Corps. The light blue symbolizes the unit's assignment to provide mobility to the Infantry Division.

Crest

None.

Background

The coat of arms was approved on 21 November 1958.
