= Combat Sustainment Support Battalion =

US Army combat service support battalion

A Combat Sustainment Support Battalion (CSSB) is a combat service support battalion of the United States Army. A CSSB can be attached to a sustainment brigade to support the brigade combat teams and support brigades assigned to a corps with maintenance, transportation, supply, field services, and distribution functions. The CSSB is task-organized with the subordinate units necessary to carry out its mission.

== Composition ==
The CSSB is a modular organization that is tasked to support between one and three brigade-sized formations, consisting of a command group and staff, and any combination of the following support companies:

=== Transportation Units ===
Units of the Transportation Corps provide for the movement of personnel and matériel (minus medical supplies) in support of Army operations. Those that are assigned under the control of a CSSB include Motor Truck Companies, Movement Control Battalions and/or Movement Control Teams.

=== Quartermaster Support Company (QSC) ===
The QSC is considered the workhorse of the CSSB, providing food service and supervision/common tools for unit level maintenance with between two and four subsistence or area support platoons. With a typical task organization of one subsistence and three area support platoons (the latter of which can operate at two different locations simultaneously each), the QSC can receive, store and issue a cumulative 94 short tons of Class I supplies a day (including refrigeration) and 204 short tons of Class II, III (P), IV and IX supplies.

=== Petroleum, Oil and Lubricant Supply Company (PSC) ===
A PSC is charged with receiving, storing and distributing petroleum, oil and lubricant (POL) products. Each PSC is composed of three platoons which contain Area Support Sections (which can store and receive 360,000 gallons of POL) and Distribution Sections (transporting 146,250 gallons of POL daily) and can operate up to six hot refueling sites. A PSC equipped for tactical sustainment support can store 1.8 million gallons of POL and receive/issue 600,000 gallons daily; when equipped for operational sustainment support it can store 5 million gallons and receive/issue 900,000 gallons daily. A PSC may also be assigned a POL Quality Analysis Team to conduct quality evaluation of POL products.

=== Quartermaster Field Service Company (FSC) ===
Known also as the SLCR Company, the FSC is a Quartermaster Corps unit designed to provide shower, laundry and clothing repair service for approximately 21,000 soldiers. It consists of multiple SLCR sections, each of which can support 500 soldiers per day. In total the FSC can process 315,000 pounds of laundry on a weekly basis (assuming 15lbs per soldier per week). It can also conduct delousing as deemed necessary by the medical authority.

=== Support Maintenance Company (SMC) ===
An SMC provides tactical and operational field maintenance support for all units within the sustainment brigade's area of operation. It consists of a company headquarters providing command and control for cellular platoons, modules teams performing system repair and replacement and return to user operations. Up to 10% of an SMC's overall strength can consist of civilian augmentation as needed.

=== Component Repair Company (CRC) ===
The CRC provides support to the theater supply system, conducting component repair and return of repaired item to the supply system. The CRC operates anywhere along the distribution network, beginning at the national source of repair. The unit can attach platoons, sections and teams to an SMC or other sustainment units.

=== Collection & Classification Company (C&C Co) ===
A C&C Co establishes and operates collection and classification facilities for the receipt, inspection, disassembly, preservation and disposition of both domestic and foreign Class VII and IX materiel. This includes both serviceable and unserviceable material, with an exception made for cryptographic equipment, missile systems, aircraft, airdropped materiel, UAVs and medical equipment. C&C teams are often attached forward, at the discretion of the Distribution Management Center.

=== Quartermaster Collection Company - Mortuary Affairs (MA) ===
This company coordinates the evacuation of remains and personal effects to the Theater Mortuary Evacuation Point (TMEP) and can operate a Mortuary Affairs Decontamination Control Point (MADCP) when supported by a chemical decontamination company. It consists of two Forward Collection Platoons (FCP) which can process 240 remains a day from up to twelve locations and evacuate them to a Main Collection Platoon (MCP) which can process 400 remains a day.

=== Quartermaster Mortuary Affairs Company (MAC) ===
The MAC is organized with two personal effects platoons, two evacuation/mortuary platoons, and one collection platoon. It operates the TMEP, which can process and evacuate 500 remains per day, and operate five Mortuary Affairs Collection Points (MACP). Each MACP can operate at a separate location to receive, process and coordinate the return of 100 remains and personal effects per day to CONUS.

=== Quartermaster Water Purification and Distribution Company (WPDC) ===
A WPDC is charged with the creation, storage and distribution of potable water with between two and four platoons assigned to the company, either water purification platoons (operating six Reverse osmosis systems) and/or water storage and distribution platoons. In the typical configuration of two platoons each, the WPDC can generate 360,000 or 240,000 gallons of potable water from a fresh water or salt water source per day; static storage of 160,000 gallons of water at one location or 80,000 gallons at two locations; and distribution of 66,000 gallons of water per day (assuming 75% equipment availability and two trips per day).

=== Quartermaster Heavy Airdrop Supply Company (QHASC) ===
A QHASC has the capability to pack and conduct maintenance of parachutes for up to 450 soldiers during a 45-day period and the temporary storage and/or rigging of up to 200 short tons of equipment intended for airdrop operations. Additionally, it can provide assistance in the loading of equipment into aircraft, their release in flight, and technical advice and assistance in the recovery and evacuation of airdropped equipment.

=== Aerial Delivery Support Company (ADSC) ===
The ADSC is composed of between two and four Aerial Delivery Support Platoons, each of which can 400 personnel parachutes or 13 High Altitude Low Opening (HALO) parachutes per day and up to 75 short tons of containerized or type V heavy drop platforms. It can also provide field level maintenance of airdrop equipment and limited receipt, storage and issue of air items.

=== Quartermaster Force Provider Company ===
This company provides command and control for between one and six Force Provider Platoons, each of which operates a Force Provider module which can provide billeting and other services for up to 550 soldiers. When six modules are combined they can provide support for up to 3,300 soldiers. The Force Provider Company can be assigned to a CSSB or Theater Sustainment Command, typically during a Theater Opening operation, or can be detached to operate separately in an austere environment.

=== Quartermaster Heavy Material Support Company (HMSC) ===
The mission of the HMSC is to receive, store, and issue 1,400 tons of Class VII material per day (excluding aircraft and medical, marine or railway-oriented equipment). It also includes a deprocessing platoon which, during a 12-hour shift, can deprocess (as required) 300 tons of Class VII equipment to ready-for-issue status per day.
