= 10th Supply and Transportation Battalion =

10th Supply and Transportation Battalion may refer to:

- 10th Transportation Battalion (United States)
- 10th Sustainment Brigade
- 10th Brigade Support Battalion of the 1st Brigade Combat Team, 10th Mountain Division (United States), the successor unit of the original 10th S&T
