= 4th Transportation Command (Terminal) =

- 4th Transportation Command (Terminal) 4th Transportation Brigade SSI approved 28 June 1967
- Active: 1942–1989
- Country: United States
- Branch: US Army
- Engagements: World War II Normandy Northern France Vietnam Defensive Counteroffensive Counteroffensive, Phase II Counteroffensive III Tet Counteroffensive Counteroffensive, Phase IV Counteroffensive, Phase V Counteroffensive, Phase VI Tet 69/Counteroffensive Summer-Fall 1969 Winter-Spring 1970 Sanctuary Counteroffensive Counteroffensive, Phase VII Consolidation I Consolidation II Cease-Fire
- Decorations: Meritorious Unit Commendation, Streamer embroidered FRANCE 1944 Meritorious Unit Commendation, Streamer embroidered FRANCE 1945 Meritorious Unit Commendation, Streamer embroidered VIETNAM 1968-1969 Vietnam Cross of Gallantry with Palm

Insignia
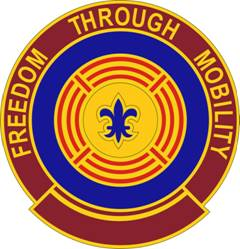
- Identification symbol: 4th Transportation Command DUI

The 4th Transportation Command was originally activated 25 March 1942 in the Army of the United States as Headquarters and Headquarters Company, 4th Port of Embarkation at Fort Lawton, Washington. The unit moved to France on 7 November 1942 as 4th Port Headquarters and Headquarters Company, Transportation Corps. After its service in World War II it was Inactivated 7 December 1945 at Camp Kilmer, New Jersey.

It was reactivated 15 July 1954 as Headquarters and Headquarters Company, 4th Transportation Command (Terminal) at Fort Eustis, Virginia. Later it was redesignated 23 June 1961 as Headquarters and Headquarters Company, 4th Transportation Command and sent to Cam Ranh Bay Vietnam. After its mission in Vietnam had ended it was moved and inactivated 28 June 1972 at Fort Lewis, Washington.

It was again reactivated and re-designated 1 April 1975 as Headquarters and Headquarters Company, 4th Transportation Brigade and Activated in Germany at Camp King, Oberursel West Germany . Re-designated 16 February 1981 as Headquarters and Headquarters Company, 4th Transportation Command with a final inactivation on 13 December 1989 with its subordinate units being absorbed by the 21st Theater Army Area Command.

== Commanders of 4th Transportation Brigade ==
| COL Richard J. Pollard | 8 Mar 1964 | 2 Sep 1965 |
| COL Richard H. Chapin | 3 Sep 1965 | 1 Feb 1968 |
| COL Robert W. Larson | 2 Feb 1968 | 2 Jun 1970 |
| COL Frederick P. Howland | 3 Jun 1970 | 24 Sep 1971 |
| COL Eric O. Rodenbeck | 25 Sep 1971 | 21 Dec 1971 |
| COL Joseph O. Meerbott | 22 Dec 1971 | 23 Aug 1973 |
| COL Franklin J. Glunn | 24 Aug 1973 | 10 Jul 1974 |
| COL John K. Henderson | 11 Jul 1974 | 6 Apr 1976 |
| COL Vincent M. Russo | 7 Apr 1976 | 18 May 1978 |
| COL Jimmy D. Ross | 19 May 1978 | 8 Jan 1980 |
| COL James Howard Dunn | 9 Jan 1980 | 18 Feb 1980 |

== Insignia ==
Shoulder Sleeve Insignia is a brick red shield 2 inches by 2 inches with a yellow border a yellow wheel and trident. The shoulder sleeve insignia was originally approved for the 4th Transportation Command on 28 June 1967.

Distinctive Unit Insignia is a gold color metal and enamel device made of three circles of brick red, blue and gold with a blue fleur-de-lis in the center and the motto "FREEDOM THROUGH MOBILITY. The distinctive unit insignia was originally approved for the 4th Transportation Brigade on 9 October 1975.
