= 11th Transportation Battalion (United States) =

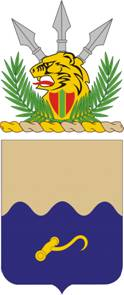
- Coat of arms
- Active: 1941–46; 1948–70; 1972–present
- Country: United States
- Branch: U.S. Army
- Type: Transportation
- Role: Port management
- Size: Battalion
- Part of: 7th Transportation Brigade
- Garrison/HQ: Fort Story, Virginia

Commanders
- Commander: LTC Angela P. Somnuk
- Command Sergeant Major: CSM Antoine L. Smith

Insignia
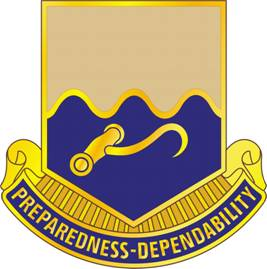
- Distinctive unit insignia

The 11th Transportation Battalion ("Over the Shore") is a transportation battalion of the United States Army first formed in 1936. The 11th Transportation Battalion is a subordinate unit of the 7th Transportation Brigade.

== Lineage ==
- Constituted 1 May 1936 in the Regular Army as the 396th Quartermaster Battalion
- Activated 1 October 1941 at Fort Hamilton, New York
- Converted and redesignated 17 September 1942 as the 396th Port Battalion, Transportation Corps
- Battalion broken up 23 March 1944 and its elements reorganized and redesignated as follows:
  - Headquarters and Headquarters Detachment as Headquarters and Headquarters Detachment, 396th Port Battalion
  - (Companies A, B, C, and D as the 692d, 693d, 694th, and 695th Port Companies, respectively-hereafter separate lineages)
- Inactivated 13 March 1946 in France
- Redesignated 29 September 1948 as Headquarters and Headquarters Detachment, 11th Transportation Port Battalion
- Activated 4 October 1948 at Fort Eustis, Virginia
- Reorganized and redesignated 27 December 1950 as Headquarters and Headquarters and Service Company, 11th Transportation Port Battalion
- Reorganized and redesignated 1 November 1952 as Headquarters, 11th Transportation Port Battalion
- Reorganized and redesignated 1 December 1953 as Headquarters and Headquarters and Service Company, 11th Transportation Port Battalion
- Reorganized and redesignated 2 October 1954 as Headquarters and Headquarters Detachment, 11th Transportation Battalion
- Inactivated 12 February 1970 in Vietnam
- Redesignated 3 April 1972 as Headquarters and Headquarters Company, 11th Transportation Battalion, and activated at Fort Eustis, Virginia

The 11th Transportation Battalion was originally constituted on 1 May 1936 in the Regular Army as the 396th Quartermaster Battalion (Port). The Transportation Corps was not established until 1942. On 17 September 1942, the battalion was converted and re-designated as the 396th Port Battalion in the Transportation Corps.

The battalion served with distinction during World War II, participating in the first large-scale Logistics Over The Shore mission during the 1943 invasion of Sicily. Later, the battalion was in charge of several marshaling yards in France and in Germany.

On 29 September 1948, the battalion was re-designated as the 11th Transportation Port Battalion. Later, the battalion was reorganized and re-designated as the 11th Transportation Battalion. During the Vietnam War, the battalion also served with distinction receiving three Meritorious Unit Commendations and numerous campaign credits spanning the period of 1965 through 1970.

Although the battalion headquarters did not deploy to the Gulf War, over 500 soldiers attached to four units were sent to augment the 7th Transportation Group. In the fall of 1994, the battalion deployed to Haiti, in support of Operation Uphold Democracy, and again served with distinction receiving the Army Superior Unit Award. Immediately afterward, the battalion deployed to Southwest Asia in support of Operation Vigilant Warrior. 11th Transportation Battalion Operated LACV-30 Hovercraft from 1983 to 1994.

The last LARC-LXs were retired with the inactivation of the 309th Transportation (LARC LX) Company, 11th Transportation Battalion, on 15 October 2001.

Since then the battalion has participated in numerous joint and combined exercises both in and out of CONUS. In January 2003 the battalion deployed again to Southwest Asia in support of Operations Enduring and Iraqi Freedoms.

Today, the 11th Transportation Battalion conducts multi-modal and terminal transportation operations. It consists of over 850 Soldiers who practice 27 different military occupational specialties in Seaport Operations Companies, an Inland Cargo Transfer Company, a Headquarters Detachment, a Harbormaster Detachment, and an Automated Cargo Documentation Detachment in support of the 7th Sustainment Brigade at Fort Eustis, Virginia. The battalion currently has deployment rotations in continuous support of the global war on terrorism.

== Campaign participation credit ==
OEF/OIF Rotation 1, -Kuwait 2002–2003(Shuaiba Port)

World War II: Sicily (with arrowhead); Rome-Arno; Southern France; Rhineland

Vietnam: Defense; Counteroffensive; Counteroffensive, Phase II; Counteroffensive, Phase III; Tet Counteroffensive; Counteroffensive, Phase IV; Counteroffensive, Phase V; Counteroffensive, Phase VI; Tet 69/Counteroffensive; Summer-Fall 1969; Winter-Spring 1970

== Decorations ==
- Meritorious Unit Commendation (Army) for VIETNAM 1965–1966
- Meritorious Unit Commendation (Army) for VIETNAM 1966–1967
- Meritorious Unit Commendation (Army) for VIETNAM 1968
- Army Superior Unit Award for AUG-OCT 1994
- Army Superior Unit Award for OCT-DEC 1994
- Meritorious Unit Commendation (Army) for Operation Iraqi Freedom 2007–2008
