= LACV-30 =

Lighter Air Cushioned Vehicle, 30 Tons
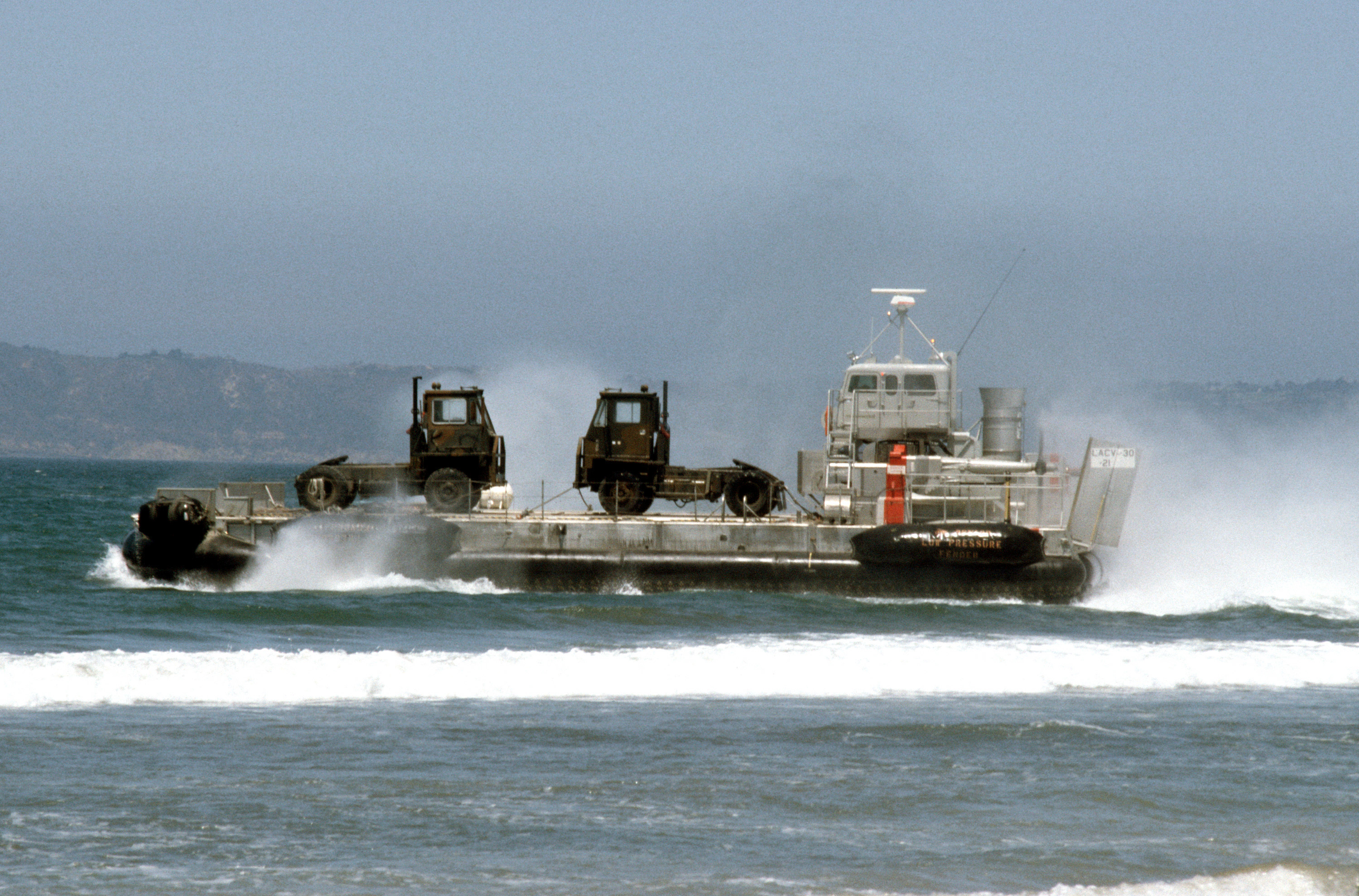
- A US Army LACV-30
- Type: Hovercraft
- Place of origin: United States

Service history
- Used by: U.S. Army

Production history
- Manufacturer: Bell Aerospace Textron
- Unit cost: $5.833 million (1983)
- Produced: 1983-1994
- No. built: 26

Specifications
- Mass: 29,510 kilograms (65,060 lb)
- Length: 24 metres (79 ft)
- Width: 12 metres (39 ft)
- Crew: 5
- Engine: 2 Pratt & Whitney PT6T Twin-Pac gas turbines 1800 hp (ea.)
- Payload capacity: 30 tons (27 tonnes)
- Maximum speed: 97 kilometres per hour (60 mph)

The LACV-30 (Lighter Air Cushion Vehicle, 30 tons) was a hovercraft used by the U.S. Army Mobility Equipment Research and Development Command (MERADCOM) for offloading cargo from amphibious ships. For logistic transport, the Army was already using the LARC-V and LARC-LX, huge 4-wheeled vehicles referred to as 'barges on wheels'. The Army used the LACV-30 to transport 20 ft. standard MILVAN containers as well as outsize loads that would not fit on a LARC-V or LARC-LX. MERADCOM operated 24 LACV-30s between 1983 and 1994.

The LACV-30 was derived from the civilian Bell Voyageur air-cushion vehicle (hovercraft). It is capable of carrying 30 tons (27 tonnes). The hull is that of a large barge, but behind the deck house at the stern, there are 2 air propellers, which are followed by rudders, while under the hull there is a cushion of air which is inflated by 2 fans. There is a large crane at the bow, with a rectangular superstructure shaped like that of a typical river barge.

A noteworthy feature of the vehicle is that, if necessary, it can be divided into 15 sections that can be transported and reassembled, and put in the water by its crew. The LACV-30 was capable of traveling in conditions of up to sea state 3.

The LACV-30 was criticized for its high purchase and operating costs: it consumed five to seven times as much fuel as a conventional lighter. An Army report further criticized its poor reliability, availability, and maintainability. The LACV-30 was also often unable to carry the advertised 30 tons, with typical loads being 22 to 23 tons, although modifications begun in 1983, namely adding a new stern seal and raising the longitudinal seal, enabled the LACV-30 to carry 30-35 tons.

The LACV-30s were operated by 8th and 331st Transportation Companies in the U.S. Army's 11th Transportation Battalion from 1983 to 1994. Each company had 12 vehicles. The U.S. Navy conducted tests on the LACV-30 from 1985–1988.

Following their Army service, most LACV-30s were sold to a Native Alaskan company for use as cargo and passenger transports in Alaska. In 1996, the U.S. Postal Service investigated the possibility using LACV-30 hovercraft to deliver mail to remote villages in the vicinity of Bethel, Alaska. The LACV-30 was rejected for environmental concerns, particularly its high noise level. The LACV-30 is comparable in noise level to modern military jets or first-generation commercial jet airliners.
