= 7th Transportation Brigade =

7th Transportation Brigade (Expeditionary)
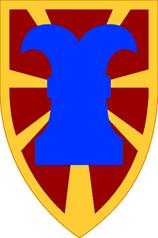
- 7th Transportation Brigade (Expeditionary) shoulder sleeve insignia
- Active: 1942–present
- Country: United States
- Branch: United States Army Transportation Corps
- Type: Transportation Brigade (Expeditionary)
- Size: Brigade
- Part of: 3rd Corps Sustainment Command
- Garrison/HQ: Fort Eustis, Virginia
- Decorations: Meritorious Unit Commendation

Commanders
- Current commander: COL John E. Gray
- Command Sergeant Major: CSM Arcelia Staggers
- Notable commanders: COL Beth A. Behn

Insignia
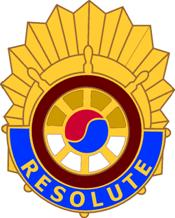
- Distinctive Unit Insignia

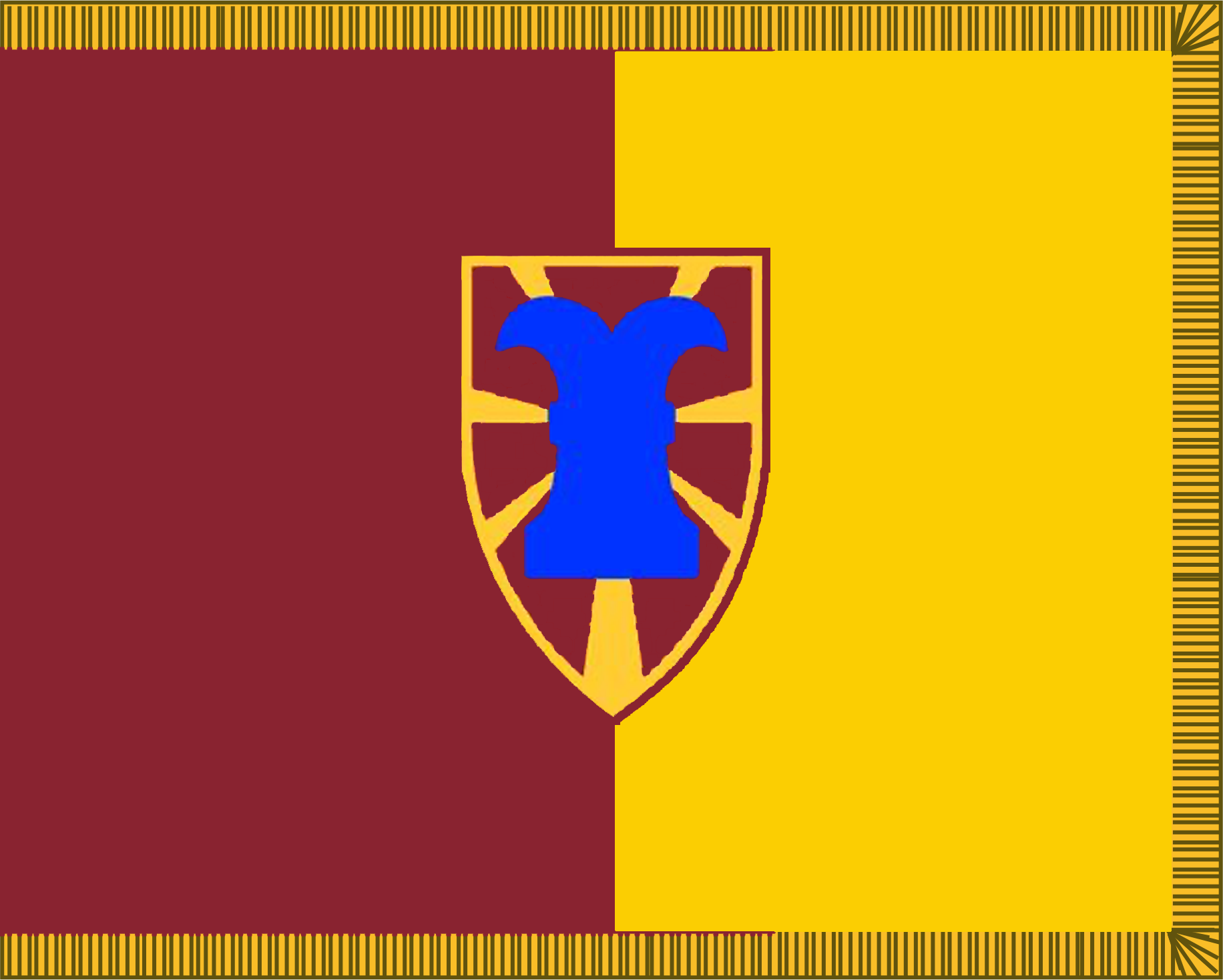
- 7th Transportation Brigade Flag.png

The 7th Transportation Brigade (Expeditionary) is a Transportation brigade of the United States Army. It is known and referred to as "the most deployed unit in the Army" because of its continuous mission to provide logistical support to all branches of the service for both training and war-time activities.

== Units ==
- 7th Transportation Brigade (Expeditionary), Fort Eustis
  - 10th Transportation Battalion (Terminal)
  - 11th Transportation Battalion (Terminal)

== History ==
The 7th Transportation Group was the "Army's Navy." The 7th Transportation Group was the only Composite Transportation Group within the Active Component of the U.S. Army. The 7th Transportation Group has served around the world in time of conflict since its activation in 1942. The 7th Transportation Group executes missions such as the annual Joint Logistics-Over-the-Shore (JLOTS) operations.

The 7th Transportation Group's mission is to "conduct multi-modal transportation operations in support of the Reception, Staging, Onward Movement and Integration (RSOI) of joint and/or combined forces into a theater of operations". While the focus is normally on the group's ability to operate common-user seaports, coastal and inland waterway Main Supply Routes (MSRs), theater rail terminals and local and line haul truck transportation, the group's capabilities extend beyond these functions.

The group is structured with one Movement Control Battalion and two Terminal Battalions. All three battalions are composite and multi-functional. In total, the group has a current strength of just over 4000 soldiers, operates 59 vessels, and 1100 ground vehicles. Almost a quarter of these vehicles are material handling equipment.

The unit supports all branches of the service by moving troops, equipment, and supplies. It also performs humanitarian missions. To do this, the 7th Transportation Group operates ports, rail terminals, and coastal and inland watch ways all over the world. Operation Uphold Democracy Haiti/Retrograde is an example of deployment of 7th Transportation Group personnel.

During World War II, the 7th Transportation Group commanded ports in the United Kingdom. During the Korean War, the 7th Group was redesignated as the 7th Medium Port and was responsible for all port operations in Pusan, Korea, in support of UN Forces. During the Vietnam War, the command provided a training base for the deployment of all watercraft and terminal service units deployed to the Republic of Vietnam.

During the Grenada evacuation operation, elements of the group deployed on two separate occasions to discharge and load cargo by sea and air. The command was called upon again during Operation Just Cause in Panama, where it deployed to provide airfield and control group support and functional services.

During the period of 1990 and 1991, the 7th Transportation Group played a key role in the success of Operations Desert Shield, Storm and Farewell. Within days of the Iraqi invasion of Kuwait, elements of the group began pouring into the Saudi desert. After the 82d Airborne Division, transporters from the 7th Transportation Group, Fort Eustis, Virginia were the next soldiers to deploy to the Middle East, readying the ports, air terminals and lines of communication for the rest of the U.S. military. Once the troops were in place, the 22d Support Command had to provide materiel and stores to the forward units. Until the arrival of the 32d Transportation Group in January, the 7th Transportation Group served as the Support Command's long-distance trucker as well as manager of the ports. Opening the first seaports and airfields, the command grew to 9,200 soldiers.

Little more than a year after the return from Saudi Arabia, the group became involved in the deployment of over 1,100 soldiers in support of Operation Restore Hope in December 1992. The last rotation of soldiers departed the Port of Mogadishu in April 1994 after the United Nations assumed command of the humanitarian operation. Four months later, the group was again involved in another humanitarian mission in Mombasa, Kenya, providing relief support to Rwanda during Operation Support Hope.

In September 1994, at the onset of Operation Uphold Democracy, the group deployed over 1,500 soldiers to Haiti, providing transportation support to U.S. and allied forces. During October 1994, the group deployed over 580 soldiers to southwest Asia in support of Operation Vigilant Warrior.

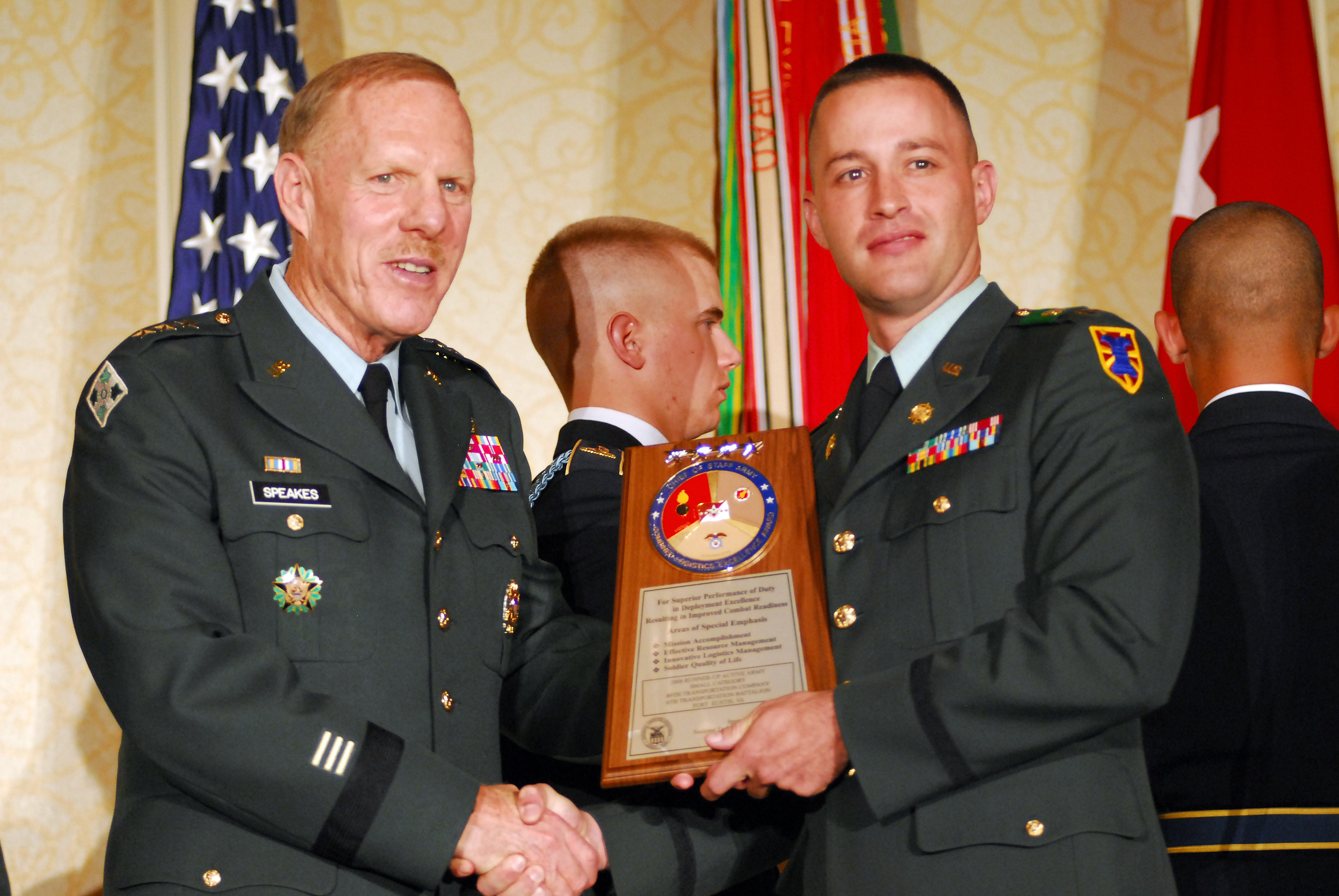
2LT Joseph Pittard of 89th Transportation Company, 6th Transportation Battalion, 7th Sustainment Brigade receives an award for his Unit's Deployment Excellence.

Craney Island was one of several strategic landmarks in the 7th Transportation Group exercise called "Resolute Shamrock '95." The battalion-sized training event involved about 500 soldiers, collectively, from the group's four battalions. They included the 6th, 10th and 24th Trans. battalions from Fort Eustis, and the 11th Trans Bn. from Fort Story, Virginia, whose 309th Transportation Company is the only active-duty unit in the Army that operates the LARCs, the Army's only amphibious vehicles at that time. About 100 soldiers from the U.S. Army Transportation School at Fort Eustis also participated in the exercise. Resolute Shamrock began 6 March, when the 24th Transportation Battalion was alerted to a simulated crisis situation. Within 24 hours, it had set up a processing center at Fort Eustis, where soldiers received shots and updated wills. About 300 of them underwent DNA testing, the results of which remain in their personnel files for identification purposes. Simultaneously, soldiers from the Causeway Company began reconfiguring one of the causeway piers that had been towed by tugboat from Fort Eustis to Craney Island. Back at Fort Eustis, 24th Transportation Battalion soldiers began moving a token number of their vehicles and equipment to Lambert's Point in Norfolk, Virginia. There other 7th Group soldiers and U.S. Army Transportation School students uploaded the materials, via another causeway pier, onto a fast sealift ship. LCU-2000s (landing craft, utility) and mike boats then transported the vehicles and equipment from the FSS to Craney Island. Later in the exercise, during operations at a secondary port at the Little Creek Naval Amphibious Base at Virginia Beach, the smaller craft came alongside a second LSV to offload cargo.

7th Group soldiers deployed to Hungary and Bosnia in December 1995 to support the NATO Implementation Force.

In early 1996, 7th Group soldiers played a key role in the withdrawal of U.S. forces from Haiti. Throughout 1997, Group soldiers participated in exercises and operations across 17 countries, including a deployment to Kuwait in support of Operation Desert Thunder. In April 1999, the Defense Department managed ground transportation for NATO's 50th-anniversary summit in Washington DC. The District of Columbia National Guard Armory served as the operations center, with soldiers from 6th Battalion, 7th Transportation Command, Fort Eustis, Virginia, mainly involved in the mission. A planning team from 7th Transportation Group had been working with these units since the beginning of the year.

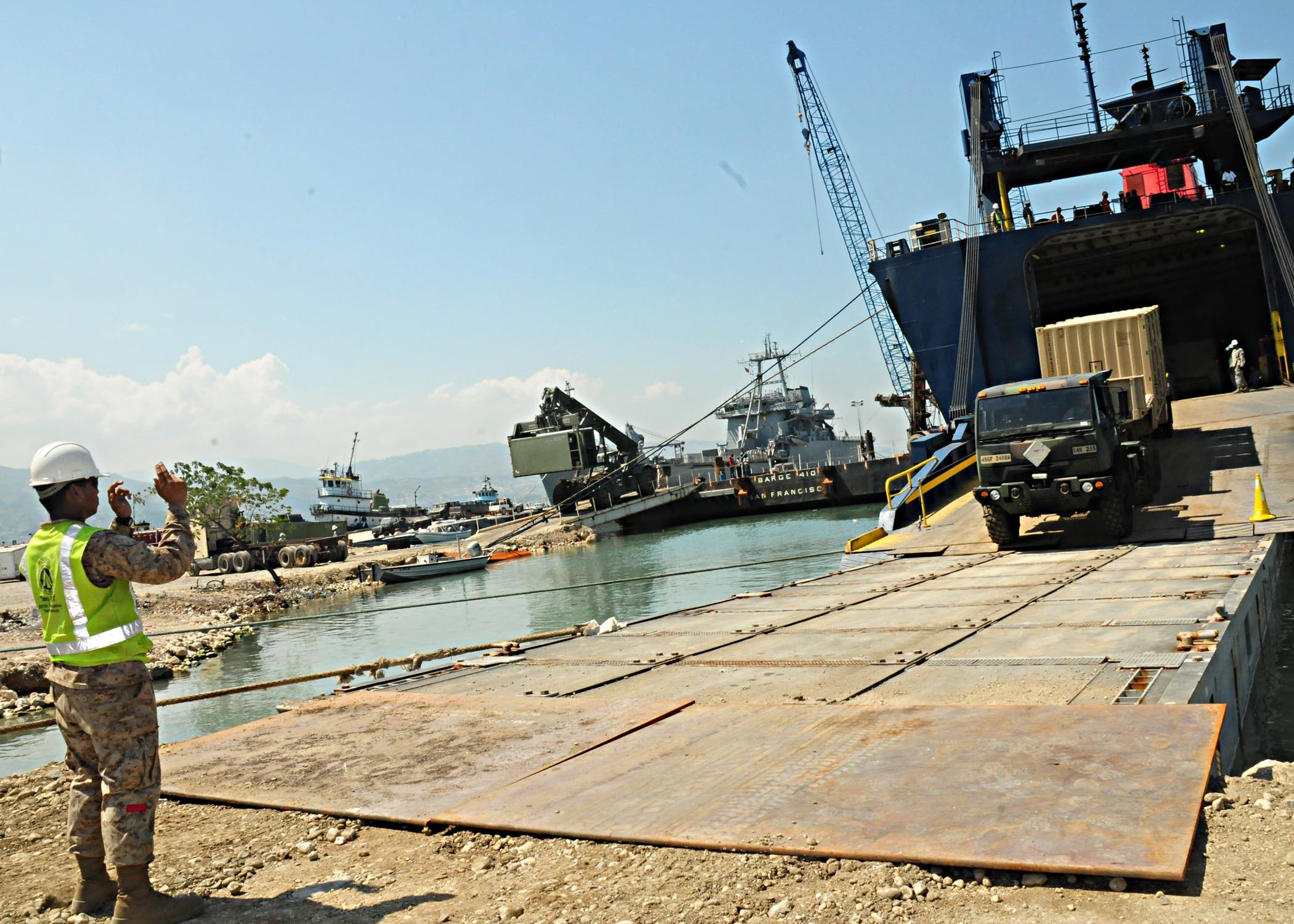
Service members from the U.S. Army 7th Sustainment Brigade off-load construction vehicles and equipment for Operation Unified Response in Port-au-Prince, Haiti.

The Army and Navy conducted a joint logistics over-the-shore (JLOTS) operation at MCB camp Pendleton, California, as part of Exercise Turbo Patriot in September 2000. The 143rd Transportation Command, an Army Reserve headquarters from Orlando, Florida, oversaw the exercise. The 7th Transportation Group (Composite) from Fort Eustis, Virginia, the Navy's Amphibious Group Three from San Diego, and the Military Sealift Command provided forces, ships, and equipment. Equipment belonging to the 25th Infantry Division (Light) from Schofield Barracks, Hawaii, was loaded aboard the USNS Seay, a large, medium speed, roll-on-roll-off (LMSR) ship, at Pearl Harbor, Hawaii, and sailed to the California coast. There the equipment was downloaded in the open ocean and moved to a bare beach by Army and Navy lighters.

== Insignia ==
=== Distinctive unit insignia ===
The Distinctive Unit Insignia was approved on 21 September 1971, consisting of a gold demi-sun with eleven gold beveled rays, surmounted in base by a gold ship's steering wheel of eight spokes with brick red rim, bearing at the hub a Korean Taeguk (scarlet at the top and blue at base), the areas in the lower half of the wheel between the spokes pierced, all above a semicircular blue enamel scroll with ends folded over the horizontal handles of the steering wheel and inscribed, "RESOLUTE" in gold letters. The eleven sun rays refer to the unit's service in Europe, World War II, and its participation in ten campaigns in the Korean War. The Taeguk alludes to the organization's two Meritorious Unit Commendations, Korea and the two Republic of Korea Presidential Unit Citation awards. The ship's steering wheel and the blue scroll allude to the organization's mission to command units employed in the operation of water terminals. Brick red and golden (gold) yellow are colors used for the Transportation Corps.

=== Shoulder Sleeve Insignia ===
The shoulder sleeve insignia was originally approved for the 7th Transportation Command on 3 Apr 1967. As an exception to policy requested by then Group Commander Colonel Edward T. Fortunato, on 1 Mar 1984 the insignia was authorized for wear by personnel of the 7th Transportation Group. It consists of a brick red shield within a golden yellow border, issuing from the center point throughout seven golden yellow rays surmounted by a blue chess-rook. The rays issuing from the center of the shield refer to the receiving and dispersal of personnel and cargo. The rays are seven in number in reference to the numerical designation of the organizations. The "rook" is the chess piece for a castle, medieval stronghold of fighting men and supplies. The name is derived from the Persian word "rokh", meaning a soldier, and is used to represent the military troops and equipment being transferred from one mode of transportation to another at the organization. Blue, the Infantry color, refers to the organization's capability of defending itself as Infantry against hostile ground attack. Brick red and golden yellow are for the Transportation Corps.

== See also ==
- List of transportation units of the United States Army
