= List of quartermaster units of the United States Army =

This is a List of Quartermaster units of the United States Army from the Quartermaster Corps.

== Brigades ==
Insignia	Brigade	Affiliation	HQ Location	Years active	Notes
	Quartermaster Brigade				
	23rd Quartermaster Brigade		Fort Lee, Virginia	February 12, 1987	Quartermasters Corps Training unit

== Battalions ==
Insignia	Battalion	Subordinate to	Affiliation	HQ Location	Years active	Notes
	Quartermaster Battalion					

== Companies ==
Insignia	Company	Part of Battalion	Affiliation	HQ Location	Detachment Location(s)	Years active	Notes
	100th Quartermaster Company	17th Special Troops Battalion	Nevada Army National Guard	Las Vegas			
	639th Quartermaster Supply Company		Montana Army National Guard	Havre	Libby Kalispell		
	1387th Quartermaster Company	184th Sustainment Command	Mississippi Army National Guard				
	Quartermaster Company						

== Detachments ==
Insignia	Detachment	Part of Company	Affiliation	HQ Location	Detachment Location	Years active	Notes
	5th Quartermaster Detachment						
	52nd Quartermaster Detachment						
	53rd Quartermaster Detachment						
	62nd Quartermaster Detachment						
	87th Quartermaster Detachment						
	255th Quartermaster Detachment						
	391st Quartermaster Detachment						
