= 425th Transportation Brigade (United States) =

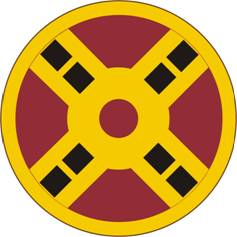
- Active: 1945-inactive
- Disbanded: unknown
- Country: United States
- Branch: US Army Reserve
- Role: Transportation
- Size: Brigade
- Motto: Strength In Mobility

Insignia
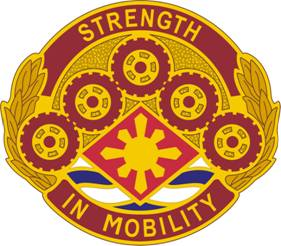
- 425TH TRANSPORTATION DUI

The 425th Transportation Brigade (United States) was a unit of the US Army Reserve. The unit's history begins with US Forces Pacific during World War II, as HHC 100th Highway Transport Services in May 1945 in Manila, Philippines. The unit transported supplies to both American units and Filipino guerrillas. It was deactivated in 1946.

It was redesignated 425th Highway Transport Services and reactivated in 1947 in Chicago, Ill. as a part of Fifth Army in the US Army Reserve. In 1949 it would be redesignated again as 425th Highway Transportation Division. It would undergo several other reorganizations and move to Oak Park, Ill. in 1957.

In 1960 it would be assigned to XI US Army Corps and redesignated 425th Transportation Command. In 1964 the unit would move to Forest Park, Ill. and be reorganized several times before 1972 when it would be redesignated 425th Transportation Brigade.

The unit deployed to Kuwait for Operation Desert Shield and Operation Desert Storm and was deactivated sometime afterwards, but no public records show the date.

The unit earned two Meritorious Unit Commendations - the first in the Philippines in 1945 and the second from U.S. Army Pacific (USARPAC) in 1946. And it earned the Asiatic-Pacific Theater Streamer.

== Subordinate Units (circa 1988) ==
- 336th Transportation Group - Lake Bluff Ill.
  - 32nd Transportation Det. - Fort McCoy Wi.
  - 77th Transportation Det. - Fort McCoy, Wi.
  - 226th Transportation Det. - Fort Sheridan, Ill.
  - 304th Transportation Det. - Des Moines, Iowa
  - 339th Transportation Det. - Fort Sheridan, Ill.
  - 340th Transportation Det. - Fort McCoy, Wi.
  - 343rd Transportation Det. Fort Smelling, Minn.
  - 677th Transportation Det. - Fort Sheridan, Ill.
  - 900th Transportation Det. - Fort Sheridan, Ill.
- 419th Transportation Battalion - Peoria, Ill.
  - 542nd Transportation Company - Kingsbury, Ind.
  - 724th Transportation Company - Peoria, Ill.
  - 724th Transportation Company Det. 1 - Davenport, Iowa
  - 685th Transportation Company - Lake Station, Ind.
- 791st Transportation Battalion - Grand Rapids, Mich.
  - 180th Transportation Company - Grand Rapids, Mich.
  - 180th Transportation Company Det. 1 - Fort Wayne, Ind.
  - 182nd Transportation Company - Traverse City, Mich.
- 457th Transportation Battalion - Fort Smelling, Minn.
  - 353rd Transportation Company - Buffalo, Minn.
  - 890th Transportation Company - Green Bay, Wis.
  - 915th Transportation Company - Council Bluffs, Iowa
- 757th Transportation Battalion (Railway) - West Allis, Wis.
- 226th Transportation Company - Granite City, Ill.
  - 1150th Transportation Company - West Allis, Wis.
  - 1151st Transportation Company - West Allis, Wis.
  - 1152nd Transportation Company - West Allis, Wis.
