= 650th Regional Support Group =

- Country: United States
- Branch: United States Army Reserve
- Size: Brigade
- Part of: 311th Sustainment Command (Expeditionary)
- Garrison/HQ: Sloan (NV)

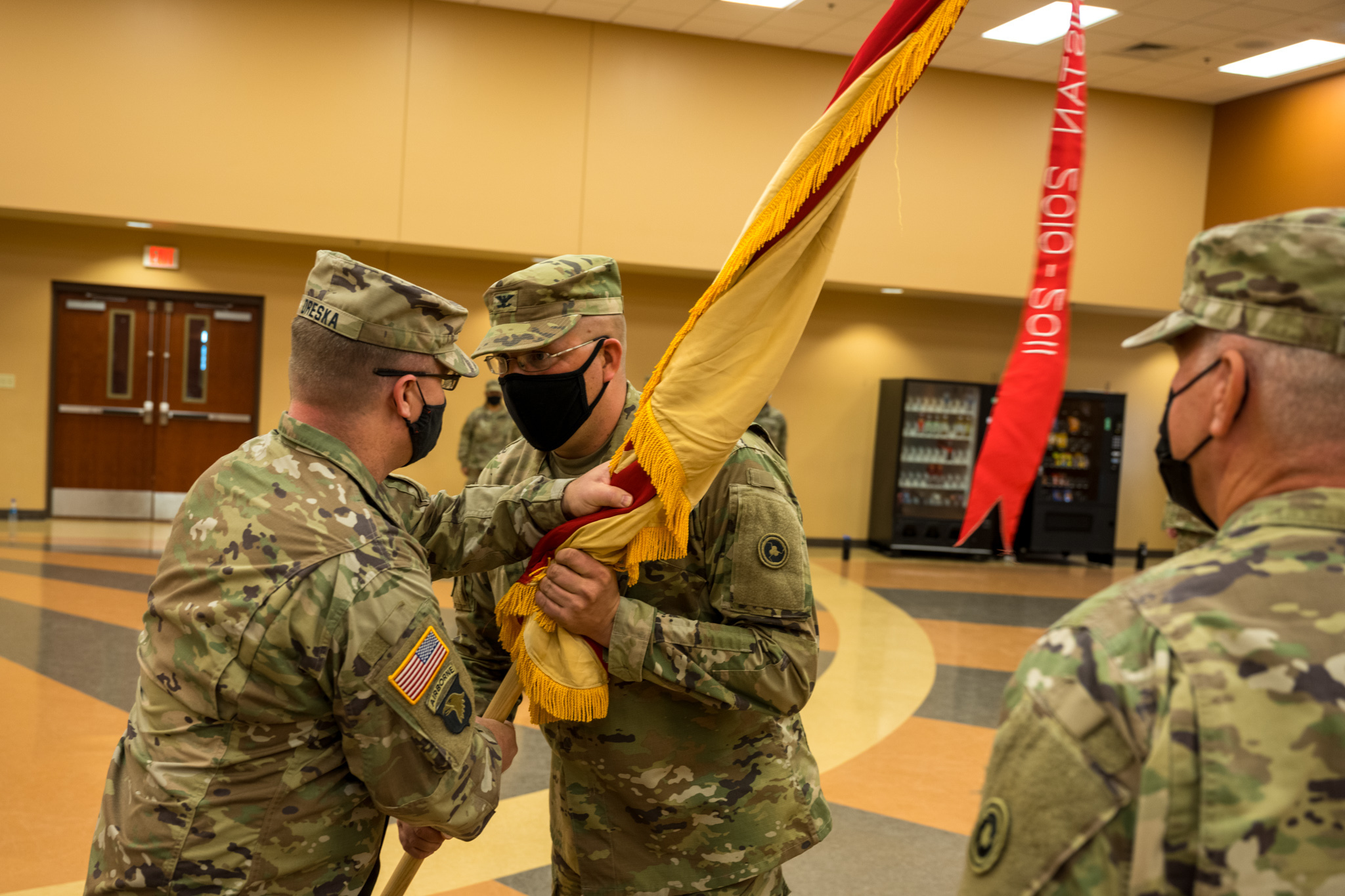
Brig. Gen. John M. Dreska, commanding general, 311th Expeditionary Sustainment Command, passes the colors Col. David Nowicki during a change of command ceremony held on August 15, 2021.

650th Regional Support Group is a United States Army Reserve unit which controls a Combat Sustainment Support Battalion and Transportation units within California and Nevada. The current Commander for this unit is Colonel David G. Nowicki. COL Nowicki is a logistics officer.

== Organization ==
The 650th Regional Support Group is a subordinate unit of the 311th Expeditionary Sustainment Command. As of January 2026 the group consists of the following units:

- 650th Regional Support Group, in Sloan (NV)
  - Headquarters and Headquarters Company, 650th Regional Support Group, in Sloan (NV)
  - 314th Combat Sustainment Support Battalion, in Sloan (NV)
    - Headquarters and Headquarters Company, 314th Combat Sustainment Support Battalion, in Sloan (NV)
    - 257th Transportation Company (Combat HET), at Nellis Air Force Base (NV)
      - Detachment 1, 257th Transportation Company (Combat HET), in Red Rock (AZ)
    - 306th Quartermaster Company (Petroleum Support), in Sloan (NV)
    - 645th Transportation Company (Inland Cargo Transfer Company — ICTC), in Sloan (NV)
    - 948th Transportation Detachment (Movement Control Team), at Nellis Air Force Base (NV)
    - 957th Transportation Detachment (Movement Control Team), at Nellis Air Force Base (NV)
  - 469th Combat Sustainment Support Battalion, in Mountain View (CA)
    - Headquarters and Headquarters Company, 469th Combat Sustainment Support Battalion, in Mountain View (CA)
    - 227th Transportation Company (Inland Cargo Transfer Company — ICTC), in Sacramento (CA)
    - 330th Transportation Detachment (Movement Control Team), in Fresno (CA)
    - 728th Transportation Medium Truck Company (PLS) (EAB Tactical), in Vallejo (CA)
    - 729th Transportation Medium Truck Company (Cargo) (EAB Linehaul), in Fresno (CA)
      - Detachment 1, 729th Transportation Medium Truck Company (Cargo) (EAB Linehaul), in Bakersfield (CA)

Abbreviations: PLS — Palletized Load System; HET — Heavy Equipment Transporter; EAB — Echelon Above Brigade
