= List of aviation companies of the United States Army =

This is a List of aviation companies of the United States Army from the United States Army Aviation Branch.

== Numbered companies ==
Company	First HQ Location	Aircraft operated	Years active	Groups assigned to	Designation	Notes
1st Aviation Company	Thailand; Vung Tau		1962-63			
3rd Aviation Company	Fort Benning		1957-1963; 1964; 1971-72			4th Battalion, 3rd Aviation Regiment.
4th Aviation Company	Fort Lewis		1957-1963			4th Aviation Regiment.
10th Aviation Company	Germany		1957-1958			
11th Aviation Company	Fort Benning; Phuoc Linh	Grumman OV-1 Mohawk; Bell UH-1 Huey				
17th Aviation Company	Fort Riley; Long Binh	de Havilland Canada C-2 Caribou		12th Combat Aviation Group; 16th Aviation Group; 101st Air Cavalry Division	(Assault Helicopter)	
18th Aviation Company	Fort Riley; Qui Nhon	de Havilland Canada U-1A Otter			(Utility Airplane) (Corps)	
19th Aviation Company		Sikorsky CH-37B Mojave				
21st Aviation Company	Fort Lewis; Chu Lai	Cessna O-1 Bird Dog	1965-1972	12th Combat Aviation Group; 16th Combat Aviation Group	(Reconnaissance Airplane)	"The Black Aces"
25th Aviation Company	Fort Hood; Long Binh		1957-1988	12th Combat Aviation Group	(Corps)	25th Aviation Regiment.
28th Aviation Company	Capital City Airport, Pennsylvania		1 June 1959			The unit was reorganized as the 28th Aviation Battalion on 1 April 1963
35th Aviation Company						
41st Aviation Company	Camp Murray		1959-2005			Originally divisional aviation company for the 41st Infantry Division. Now the 168th Aviation Regiment.
48th Aviation Company	Fort Benning; Phan Rang, Ninh Hoa, Dong Ha, Marble Mountain	Bell UH-1B, C, D, H, Bell AH-1G HueyCobra			(Assault Helicopter)	
54th Aviation Company	Vung Tau			12th Combat Aviation Group	(Utility Airplane)	
57th Aviation Company	Fort Sill; Vung Tau	CV-2 Caribou UH-1 Huey; AH-1G HueyCobra	-1967 1968- 1971-	12th Combat Aviation Group	Fixed Wing (Assault Helicopter)	
59th Aviation Company	Tan Son Nhut				(Assault Helicopter) (Corps)	
60th Aviation Company	Ninh Hoa	AH-1 HueyCobra UH-1H Huey			(Assault Helicopter)	
61st Aviation Company	Fort Bragg; Vung Tau	CV-2 Caribou	-1967	12th Combat Aviation Group	(Assault Helicopter)	
62nd Aviation Company	Fort Benning; XXIV Corps Headquarters, Phu Bai then Marble Mountain	UH-1H, OH-58, OH-6, CH-47C, U-21	1969-1973	1st Aviation Brigade	(Corps)	1973–1987, V Corps, 11th Aviation Battalion, 12th CAG, Maurice Rose AAF, West Germany
68th Aviation Company	Fort Benning; Bien Hoa	UH-1B/C Huey	1964-1965	12th Combat Aviation Group	(Assault Helicopter)	Formerly the Utility Tactical Transport; Helicopter Company (UTTHCO) until 1964.
71st Aviation Company	Chu Lai	UH-1B Huey		12th Combat Aviation Group	(Assault Helicopter)	Previously Company A, 501st Aviation Battalion
73rd Aviation Company	Fort Rucker; Vung Tau	TO-1		12th Combat Aviation Group	(Surveillance Airplane)	
74th Aviation Company	Phu Loi	de Havilland Canada U-6A Beaver		12th Combat Aviation Group	(Reconnaissance Airplane)	
82nd Aviation Company	Fort Bragg		1957-1960 ?-2005			82nd Aviation Regiment.
92nd Aviation Company	Fort Benning; Qui Nhon; Fort Carson; Dong Ba Thin	UH-1H, UH-1C Huey	1967-		(Assault Helicopter)	
101st Aviation Company	Fort Campbell		1956-2005			101st Aviation Regiment.
114th Aviation Company	Fort Knox; Vinh Long	UH-1B/C Huey; AH-1G HueyCobra	1963-		(Airmobile Light). (Assault Helicopter)	
116th Aviation Company	Fort Bragg; Cu Chi	UH-1 Huey		12th Combat Aviation Group	(Assault Helicopter)	
117th Aviation Company	Long Binh	UH-1B Huey	1963-	12th Combat Aviation Group; 17th Combat Aviation Group	(Airmobile Light) (Assault Helicopter)	Previously 8th Transportation Company (Light Helicopter).
118th Aviation Company	Bien Hoa	UH1-B/D Huey	1963-	12th Combat Aviation Group	(Airmobile Light). (Assault Helicopter)	Previously 33rd Transportation Company (Light Helicopter).
119th Aviation Company	Pleiku	UH-1B/C Huey	1963-		(Airmobile Light). (Assault Helicopter)	Previously 81st Transportation Company (Light Helicopter).
120th Aviation Company	Long Binh	UH-1B Huey	1963-	12th Combat Aviation Group; 1st Aviation Brigade; 165th Aviation Group	(Airmobile Light). (Assault Helicopter).	Previously 57th Transportation Company (Light Helicopter).
121st Aviation Company	Soc Trang	UH-1B Huey	1963-		(Airmobile Light). (Assault Helicopter).	Previously 93rd Transportation Company (Light Helicopter).
123rd Aviation Company						
125th Aviation Company	Fort Benning; Bien Hoa				(Air Traffic Control)	
128th Aviation Company	Fort Campbell; Phu Loi	UH-1D Huey		12th Combat Aviation Group	(Assault Helicopter)	
129th Aviation Company	Fort Campbell; An Son	UH-1H Huey; AH-1 HueyCobra	1969-		(Assault Helicopter)	
131st Aviation Company	Fort Riley; Phu Bai	Grumman OV-1 Mohawk			(Surveillance Airplane)	
132nd Aviation Company	Fort Benning; An Khe; Chu Lai				(Assault Support Helicopter)	
134th Aviation Company	Fort Bragg; Can Tho	CV-2 Caribou	-1967	12th Combat Aviation Group	(Assault Helicopter)	
135th Aviation Company	Fort Benning; Dong Ba Thin	UH-1 Huey		12th Combat Aviation Group	(Assault Helicopter)	
137th Aviation Company						
138th Aviation Company						
144th Aviation Company						
146th Aviation Company						
147th Aviation Company	Fort Benning; Vung Tau	CH-47A Chinook	1965-	12th Combat Aviation Group; 164th Aviation Group	(Assault Support Helicopter)	
155th Aviation Company	Ban Me Thuot East Airfield		1965–1971		(Assault Helicopter)	
156th Aviation Company						
161st Aviation Company	Fort Benning; Qui Nhon					
162nd Aviation Company	Fort Benning; Dong Tam	UH-1D Huey		12th Combat Aviation Group	(Assault Helicopter)	
163rd Aviation Company	Gia Le	CH-47C Chinook	1971-			
169th Aviation Company						
170th Aviation Company	Fort Benning; Pleiku	UH-1H Huey			(Assault Helicopter)	
171st Aviation Company	Alaska; Saigon					
172nd Aviation Company	Alaska; Saigon					
173rd Aviation Company	Fort Benning; Lai Khe	UH-1D Huey; AH-1 HueyCobra		12th Combat Aviation Group	(Assault Helicopter)	
174th Aviation Company	Fort Benning; Duc Pho	UH-1H Huey			(Assault Helicopter)	
175th Aviation Company	Fort Benning; Qui Nhon	UH-1 Huey			(Assault Helicopter)	
176th Aviation Company	Fort Benning; Chu Lai	UH-1H Huey			(Assault Helicopter)	
178th Aviation Company	Fort Benning; Chu Lai	CH-47B Chinook	1969-	12th Combat Aviation Group	(Assault Support Helicopter)	
179th Aviation Company	Fort Benning; Pleiku	CH-47A Chinook	1967-		(Assault Support Helicopter)	
180th Aviation Company	Fort Benning; Phu Hiep				(Assault Support Helicopter)	
182nd Aviation Company		UH-1H Huey				
183rd Aviation Company	Fort Hood; Dong Ba Thin				(Reconnaissance Airplane)	
184th Aviation Company	Fort Sill; Phu Loi			12th Combat Aviation Group	(Reconnaissance Airplane)	
185th Aviation Company	Fort Knox; Ban Me Thuot East Airfield				(Reconnaissance Airplane)	
187th Aviation Company	Fort Bragg; Tay Ninh	UH-1 Huey; AH-1G HueyCobra		12th Combat Aviation Group	(Assault Helicopter)	
188th Aviation Company	Fort Campbell; Bien Hoa			12th Combat Aviation Group; 16th Aviation Group; 101st Air Cavalry Division	(Assault Helicopter)	
189th Aviation Company	Fort Carson; Pleiku				(Assault Helicopter)	
190th Aviation Company	Fort Campbell; Bien Hoa	UH-1C Huey		12th Combat Aviation Group	(Assault Helicopter)	
191st Aviation Company	Fort Bragg; Dong Tam	UH-1D/H Huey	1968-	12th Combat Aviation Group	(Assault Helicopter)	
192nd Aviation Company	Fort Riley; Phan Thiet				(Assault Helicopter)	
195th Aviation Company	Fort Carson; Long Binh			12th Combat Aviation Group	(Assault Helicopter)	
196th Aviation Company	Fort Sill; An Son				(Assault Support Helicopter)	
197th Aviation Company	Bien Hoa	UH-1B Huey	1964-65			Previously 68th Aviation Company.
199th Aviation Company	Fort Hood; Vinh Long				(Reconnaissance Airplane)	
200th Aviation Company	Fort Benning; Bear Cat			12th Combat Aviation Group; 16th Aviation Group; 101st Air Cavalry Division	(Assault Support Helicopter)	
203rd Aviation Company	Fort Sill; Phu Hiep; Da Nang	L19/0-1 Bird Dog			(Reconnaissance Airplane)	
205th Aviation Company	Fort Sill; Phu Loi			12th Combat Aviation Group	(Assault Support Helicopter)	
213th Aviation Company	Fort Benning; Phu Loi	CH-47 Chinook	1967-	12th Combat Aviation Group	(Air Mobile Medium) (Assault Support Helicopter)	
219th Aviation Company	Fort Hood; Pleiku				(Reconnaissance Airplane)	
220th Aviation Company	Fort Lewis; Phu Bai				(Reconnaissance Airplane)	
221st Aviation Company	Fort Bragg; Soc Trang				(Reconnaissance Airplane)	
225th Aviation Company	Fort Lewis; Phu Hiep				(Surveillance Airplane)	
227th Aviation Company					(Assault Helicopter)	
235th Aviation Company	Fort Benning; Can Tho	AH-1G HueyCobra	1967-		(Assault Helicopter) (Aerial Weapons) (Aero Weapons) (Attack Helicopter)	
238th Aviation Company	Fort Riley; An Khe	AH-1G HueyCobra			(Aerial Weapons)	
240th Aviation Company	Fort Hood; Bear Cat	UH-1 Huey		12th Combat Aviation Group	(Assault Helicopter)	
242nd Aviation Company	Fort Benning; Cu Chi	CH-47A Chinook		12th Combat Aviation Group	(Assault Support Helicopter)	
243rd Aviation Company	Fort Sill; Dong Ba Thin	CH-47A Chinook		17th Combat Aviation Group	(Assault Support Helicopter)	
244th Aviation Company	Fort Lewis; Can Tho				(Surveillance Airplane)	
245th Aviation Company	Fort Lewis; Da Nang	OV-1 Mohawk		1st Aviation Battalion	(Surveillance Airplane)	
271st Aviation Company	Fort Benning; Can Tho	CH-47 Chinook			(Assault Support Helicopter)	
272nd Aviation Company	Fort Sill	CH-47 Chinook	1966-	12th Combat Aviation Group; 101st Air Cavalry Division	(Assault Support Helicopter)	
273rd Aviation Company	Fort Sill; Long Binh	Sikorsky CH-54A Tarhe		12th Combat Aviation Group	(Heavy Helicopter) (Assault Support Helicopter)	
281st Aviation Company	Fort Benning; Nha Trang				(Assault Helicopter)	
282nd Aviation Company	Fort Benning; Da Nang	UH-1D Huey			(Assault Helicopter)	
284th Aviation Company		n/a	1966-1977		(Air Traffic Control)	Previously the Army Air Traffic Control; Regulation and Identification Company
334th Aviation Company	Bien Hoa	UH-1B/C Huey; AH-1G HueyCobra	1966–1969; 1967-	12th Combat Aviation Group	(Armed Helicopter) (Assault Helicopter) (Aerial Weapons)	Previously 197th Aviation Company.
335th Aviation Company	Bien Hoa	UH-1B/C/D/H/M Huey; AH-1G HueyCobra; CH-54A Tarhe	1966- 1971-1976	173rd Airborne Brigade; 1st Aviation Brigade; 12th Combat Aviation Group; 17th Combat Aviation Group	(Airmobile Light) (1966) (Assault Helicopter) (1966–1971) (Heavy Helicopter)	Previously Company A, 82nd Aviation Battalion
336th Aviation Company	Fort Campbell; Soc Trang	UH-1 Huey			(Assault Helicopter)	
355th Aviation Company	Fort Sill; Phu Hiep				(Heavy Helicopter)	
361st Aviation Company	Fort Hood; Pleiku; FSB Blackhawk	UH-1C Huey; AH-1G HueyCobra	1968-	12th Combat Aviation Group; 17th Combat Aviation Group	(Assault Helicopter) (Escort) (Aerial Weapons) (Aero Weapons)	
362nd Aviation Company	Bien Hoa				(Assault Support)	
478th Aviation Company	Fort Benning; Gia Le	CH-54A Tarhe	1965-		(Heavy Helicopter)	
501st Aviation Company	Fort Polk		1957-2005			501st Aviation Regiment.
Command Aviation Company	Vietnam; Tan Son Nhut		Vietnam	1966-73	(Corps) (USARV)	Previously USARV Flight Detachment

== Non-numbered companies ==
Company	First HQ Location	Aircraft operated	Years active	Designation	Notes
Company A, 1st Aviation Battalion	Fort Riley		1963-1987	(Divisional)	1st Battalion, 1st Aviation Regiment
Company B, 1st Aviation Battalion	Fort Riley	UH-1C Huey; AH-1G HueyCobra ?	1963-70 -1987		Joined with D Troop 1/4 CAV to become C Troop 16 CAV 2nd Battalion, 1st Aviation Regiment
Company C, 1st Aviation Battalion	Fort Riley		1981-1987		3rd Battalion, 1st Aviation Regiment
Company B, 2nd Aviation Battalion	Fort Benning		1963-1988		2nd Battalion, 2nd Aviation Regiment
Company A, 3rd Aviation Battalion	Germany		1963-1987		1st Battalion, 3rd Aviation Regiment
Company B, 3rd Aviation Battalion	Germany		1963-1987		2nd Battalion, 3rd Aviation Regiment.
Company E, 3rd Aviation Battalion	Germany		1979-1991		Company E, 3rd Aviation Regiment.
Company A, 4th Aviation Battalion	Fort Lewis		1963-1987	(Divisional)	1st Battalion, 4th Aviation Regiment.
Company B, 4th Aviation Battalion	Fort Lewis	UH-1C Huey; AH-1G HueyCobra	1963-1987		2nd Battalion, 4th Aviation Regiment.
Company C, 4th Aviation Battalion	Fort Carson		1980-1993		4th Battalion, 4th Aviation Regiment.
Company A, 5th Aviation Battalion	Fort Benning				
Company B, 9th Aviation Battalion	Fort Riley	UH-1C Huey; AH-1G HueyCobra		(Divisional)	
Headquarters and Headquarters Company, 10th Aviation Battalion	Fort Benning		1968-2005		10th Aviation Regiment.
Company A, 10th Aviation Battalion	Germany		1986-1988	(Combat)	1st Battalion, 10th Aviation Regiment.
Company B, 10th Aviation Battalion	Germany		1986-1988	(Combat)	2nd Battalion, 10th Aviation Regiment.
Company C, 10th Aviation Battalion	Germany		1986-2005	(Combat)	3rd Battalion, 10th Aviation Regiment.
Company A, 25th Aviation Battalion	Schofield Barracks		1962-1988	(Divisional)	1st Battalion, 25th Aviation Regiment.
Company B, 25th Aviation Battalion	Schofield Barracks	UH-1C Huey; AH-1G HueyCobra	1963-1988	(Divisional)	2nd Battalion, 25th Aviation Regiment.
Company C, 25th Aviation Battalion	Schofield Barracks		1979-1988	(Divisional)	Headquarters and Headquarters Company, 3rd Battalion, 25th Aviation Regiment.
Headquarters and Headquarters Company, 52nd Aviation Battalion	Fort Bragg	(Combat)	1962-1995		52nd Aviation Regiment.
Headquarters and Headquarters Company, 58th Aviation Battalion	South Vietnam		1968-1987		1st Battalion, 58th Aviation Regiment.
Company B, 58th Aviation Battalion	Germany		1986-1987		3rd Battalion, 58th Aviation Regiment.
Company A, 82nd Aviation Battalion	Fort Bragg		1962-2005		1st Battalion, 82nd Aviation Regiment.
Company B, 82nd Aviation Battalion	Fort Bragg		1962-2005		2nd Battalion, 82nd Aviation Regiment.
Company D, 82nd Aviation Battalion	Fort Bragg		1957-2005		Company D, 82d Aviation Regiment.
Company A, 101st Aviation Battalion	Fort Campbell		1962-2005	(Divisional)	1st Battalion, 101st Aviation Regiment.
Company B, 101st Aviation Battalion	Fort Campbell		1962-2005	(Divisional)	2nd Battalion, 101st Aviation Regiment.
Company C, 101st Aviation Battalion	Fort Campbell		1968-2005	(Divisional)	3rd Battalion, 101st Aviation Regiment.
Company D, 101st Aviation Battalion	Fort Campbell		1968-2005	(Assault Helicopter)	4th Battalion, 101st Aviation Regiment.
Headquarters and Headquarters Company, 101st Aviation Battalion	Fort Campbell		1962-2005		7th Battalion, 101st Aviation Regiment.
Company B, 123rd Aviation Battalion		UH-1C Huey; AH-1G HueyCobra			
Company C, 123rd Aviation Battalion	South Vietnam		1967-2005		Company C, 123rd Aviation Regiment.
Company A, 158th Aviation Battalion	Fort Carson		1968-2005		Headquarters and Headquarters Company, 1st Battalion, 158th Aviation Regiment.
Company B, 158th Aviation Battalion	Fort Carson		1968-2005		Headquarters and Headquarters Company, 2d Battalion, 158th Aviation Regiment.
Company C, 158th Aviation Battalion	Fort Riley		1968-2005		3rd Battalion, 158th Aviation Regiment.
Company D, 158th Aviation Battalion	Fort Carson		1968-2005	(Assault Helicopter)	Company D, 158th Aviation Regiment.
Company B, 159th Aviation Battalion	South Vietnam		1968-2005		Headquarters and Headquarters Company, 2nd Battalion, 159th Aviation Regiment.
Company C, 159th Aviation Battalion	Fort Sill		1968-2005		Headquarters and Headquarters Company, 3rd Battalion, 159th Aviation Regiment.
Company I, 159th Aviation Battalion	Fort Bragg		1987-2005		Company I, 159th Aviation Regiment.
Company K, 159th Aviation Battalion	Fort Stewart		1987-2005		Company K, 159th Aviation Regiment.
Company A, 160th Aviation Battalion	Fort Campbell		1982-2005		1st Battalion, 160th Aviation Regiment.
Company B, 160th Aviation Battalion	Fort Campbell		1982-2005		2nd Battalion, 160th Aviation Regiment.
Company C, 160th Aviation Battalion	Fort Campbell		1982-2005		3rd Battalion, 160th Aviation Regiment.
Company D, 160th Aviation Battalion	Fort Campbell		1982-2005		Headquarters and Headquarters Company, 4th Battalion, 160th Aviation Regiment.
Company E, 160th Aviation Battalion	Fort Campbell		1982-2005		Company E, 160th Aviation Regiment.
Headquarters and Headquarters Company, 210th Aviation Battalion	Fort Bragg		1967-2005		210th Aviation Regiment.
Headquarters and Headquarters Company, 1st Battalion, 210th Aviation Battalion	Fort Rucker		1996-2005		1st Battalion, 210th Aviation Regiment.
Headquarters and Headquarters Company, 2nd Battalion, 210th Aviation Battalion	Fort Rucker		2005		2nd Battalion, 210th Aviation Regiment.
Headquarters and Headquarters Company, 214th Aviation Battalion	Fort Campbell		1967-2005		214th Aviation Regiment.
Company A, 214th Aviation Battalion	Fort Lewis		1981-2005		1st Battalion, 214th Aviation Regiment.
Headquarters and Headquarters Company, 222nd Aviation Battalion	South Vietnam		1966-2005		222nd Aviation Regiment.
Company A, 222nd Aviation Battalion	Fort Campbell		1986-2005		1st Battalion, 222nd Aviation Regiment.
Company A, 227th Aviation Battalion	Fort Benning		1963-2005	(Assault Helicopter)	1st Battalion, 227th Aviation Regiment.
Company B, 227th Aviation Battalion	Fort Benning		1963-2005	(Assault Helicopter)	2nd Battalion, 227th Aviation Regiment.
Company C, 227th Aviation Battalion	Fort Benning		1963-2005	(Assault Helicopter)	3rd Battalion, 227th Aviation Regiment.
Company D, 227th Aviation Battalion	Fort Benning	UH-1C Huey; AH-1G HueyCobra	1963-2005	(Assault Helicopter)	4th Battalion, 227th Aviation Regiment.
Company A, 229th Aviation Battalion	Fort Benning		1964-2005	(Assault Helicopter)	1st Battalion, 229th Aviation Regiment.
Company B, 229th Aviation Battalion			1965-	(Assault Helicopter)	
Company D, 229th Aviation Battalion		AH-1G HueyCobra	Feb 1968 -	(Assault Helicopter)	
Company D, 149th Aviation Battalion	Phoenix, Arizona		1982-2005		285th Aviation Regiment.
Company A, 501st Aviation Battalion	Fort Hood	UH-1 Huey	1962-2005		1st Battalion, 501st Aviation Regiment.
Company B, 501st Aviation Battalion	Fort Hood		1962-2005		2nd Battalion, 501st Aviation Regiment.
Company C, 501st Aviation Battalion	Germany		1978-2005		3rd Battalion, 501st Aviation Regiment.
Company A, 502nd Aviation Battalion	Vinh Long	UH-1 Huey			
A Battery, 2/20th ARA		UH-1C Huey; AH-1G HueyCobra			
B Battery, 2/20th ARA		UH-1 Huey; AH-1G HueyCobra			
C Battery, 2/20th ARA		UH-1 Huey; AH-1G HueyCobra			
A Battery, 4/77th ARA		AH-1G HueyCobra			
B Battery, 4/77th ARA		AH-1G HueyCobra			
C Battery, 4/77th ARA		AH-1G HueyCobra			

== See also ==
- List of United States Army aircraft battalions
