= 17th Sustainment Brigade (United States) =

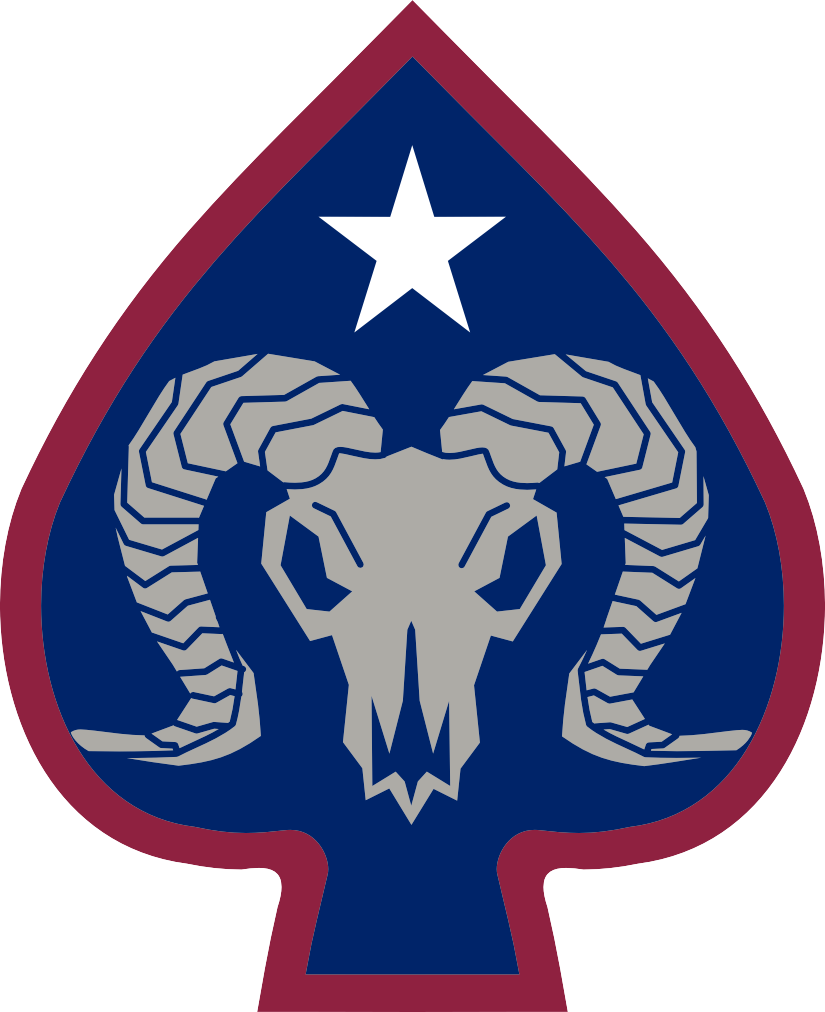
- Shoulder sleeve insignia
- Founded: 2011 - present
- Country: United States
- Branch: United States Army National Guard
- Type: Sustainment
- Size: Brigade
- Part of: Nevada National Guard
- Garrison/HQ: Las Vegas, Nevada

Commanders
- Current Commander: COL Joseph Claros
- Previous Commander: COL Amy Klima

Insignia
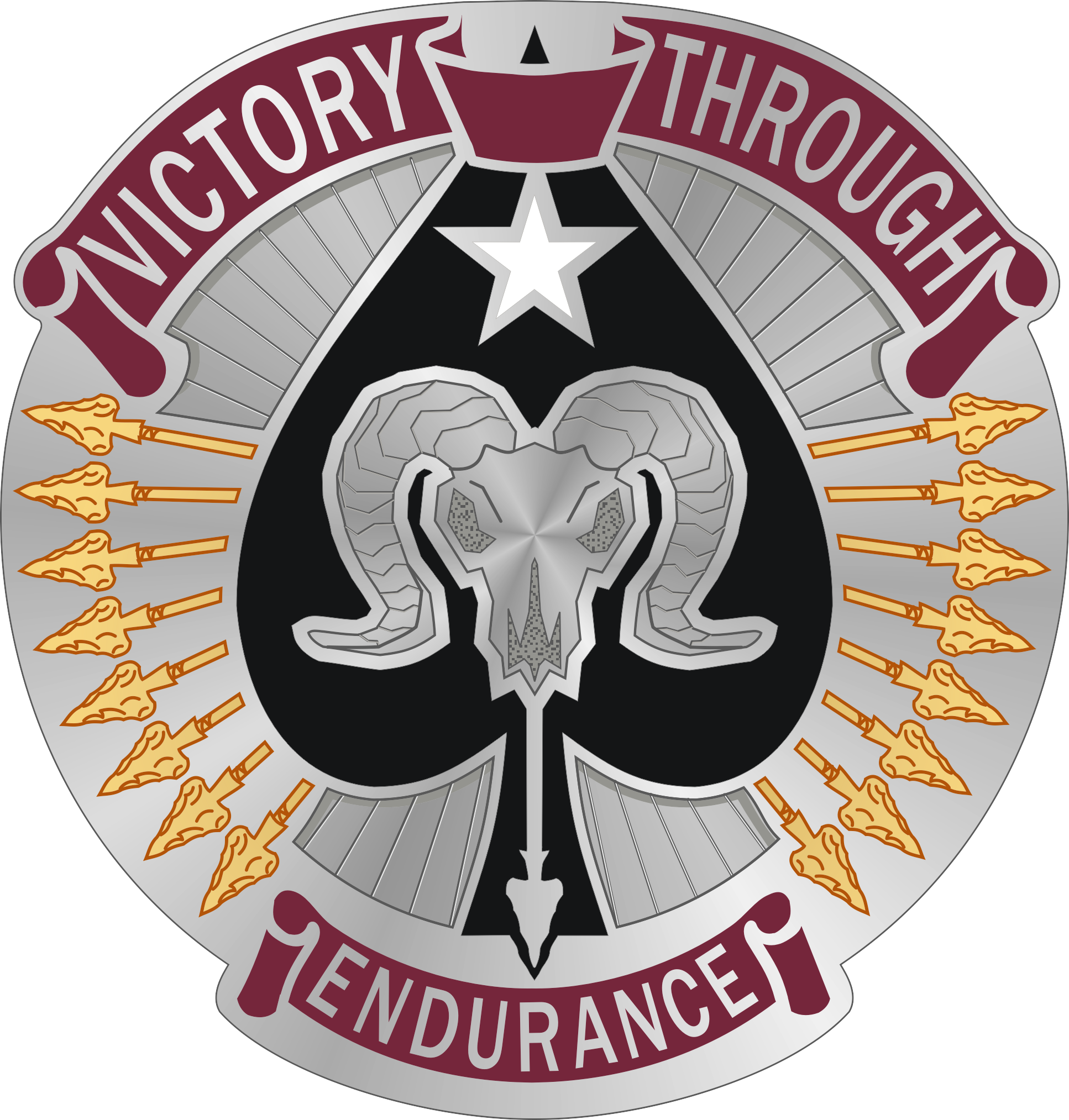
- Distinctive unit insignia

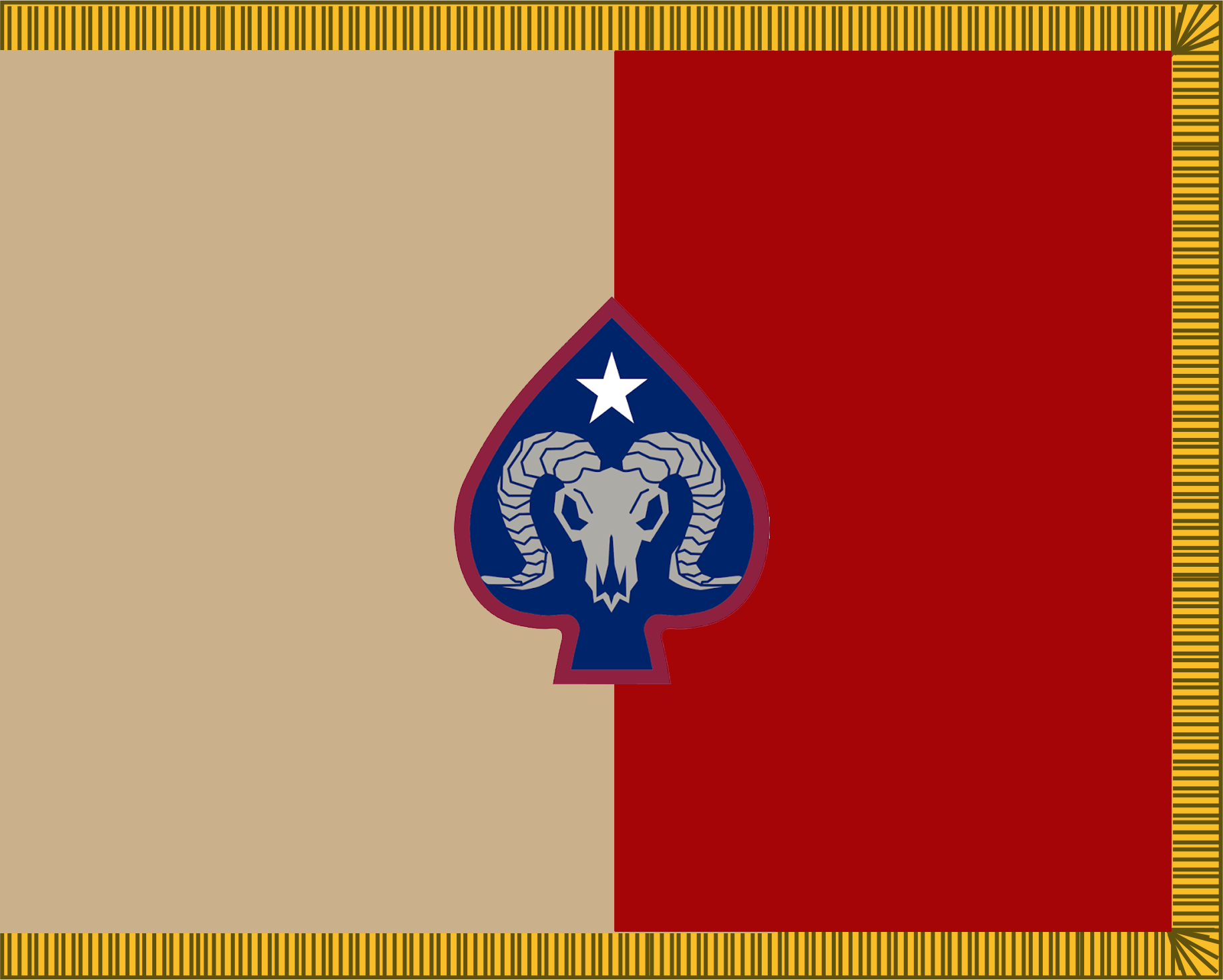
- 17th Sustainment Brigade Flag

The 17th Sustainment Brigade (SB) is a Sustainment Brigade of the United States Army and the Nevada National Guard.

== Mission ==
The 17th Sustainment Brigade (17th SB) provides command and control for 3-7 sustainment functional logistics battalions, as well as assigned human resources and financial management companies. Its responsibilities include overseeing theater distribution, supporting redeployment operations, and providing logistical support to joint, interagency, and multinational forces. Additionally, the brigade is prepared to assist civilian agencies when directed.

== History ==
The Brigade was activated in 2011 to provide command and control for the Special Troops Battalion of the brigade and the 757th Combat Sustainment Support Battalion. In June 2012 the brigade was given administrative control of the 1st Squadron, 221st Cavalry Regiment.

== Organization ==
- 17th Sustainment Brigade, in North Las Vegas
  - 17th Special Troops Battalion, in Las Vegas
    - Headquarters and Headquarters Company, 17th Sustainment Brigade, in North Las Vegas
    - 72nd Military Police Company (Combat Support), in Henderson
    - 100th Quartermaster Company (Water Purification and Distribution), in North Las Vegas
    - 240th Engineer Company (Engineer Construction Company), in North Las Vegas
    - 593rd Transportation Company (Medium Truck) (POL, 5K GAL), in North Las Vegas
    - 777th Engineer Detachment (Concrete Section), in North Las Vegas
    - 1864th Transportation Company (Medium Truck) (PLS), in Las Vegas
    - 3665th Ordnance Company (EOD), in North Las Vegas, Nevada
  - 757th Combat Sustainment Support Battalion, in Reno
    - Headquarters and Headquarters Company, 757th Combat Sustainment Support Battalion, in Reno
      - 121st Quartermaster Unit (Field Feeding), in Reno
    - 106th Public Affairs Detachment, in Reno
    - 137th Military Police Detachment (Law Enforcement), in Carson City
    - 150th Ordnance Company (Support Maintenance), in Carson City
    - 609th Engineer Company (Mobility Augmentation Company, in Fallon
    - 1859th Transportation Company (Medium Truck) (Cargo), in Reno

== Commander ==
Commander and Colonel Joseph Claros was born on December 28, 1979, in San Salvador, El Salvador. He immigrated to the United States with his family in the early 1980s.

Claros joined the military in 1998 to pay for college. He graduated from Washington State University in 2002. He deployed to Iraq (2004–5), Afghanistan (2009), South Korea (2013–15), and the Middle East (2016). He is married with two children.
