= Fürst-Wrede-Kaserne =

Barracks

Coordinates: 48°12′29″N 11°35′31″E

names
founding name	Verdun-Kaserne (Nazi use)
1945 to 1972	Will Kaserne (U.S. use)
current name	Fürst-Wrede-Kaserne (Bundeswehr use)

Fürst-Wrede-Kaserne has been a military facility in Munich, Germany, since 1936 when it was built by the Munich Heeresbauamt (army construction bureau) under its original name Verdun-Kaserne. After World War II the U.S. forces renamed it Will Kaserne, and the Bundeswehr renamed it once more in honor of Karl Philipp von Wrede on 17 April 1972.

== History ==
Originally, the fully motorized 7th Anti-Tank Detachment (Panzerabwehrabteilung 7) and an artillery unit used the barracks. After the war the facility was enlarged and renamed by the American troops who occupied it in 1951; the 169th Infantry Regiment, 43rd Division. The 43rd Division only stayed in Germany during the Korean War time. After that, elements of the 24th Division moved into Will Kaserne and stayed there until it was returned to the German government.

In 1969 the Bundeswehr acquired the installation. Until the beginning of the 1990s, the 200th Anti-Aircraft Regiment Flugabwehrregiment 200 (FlaRgt 200), the 200th Drone Battery (Drohnenbatterie 200) and the 4th Company of the 210th Maintenance Battalion Instandsetzungsbataillons 210 (4th InstBtl 210) were stationed there.

In 1993 the 1st and 3rd companies as well as the headquarters of the 760th Feldjäger (Military Police) Battalion moved from Bayern-Kaserne into the barracks. The battalion was renumbered the 451st Feldjäger Bn in 2003. Further users of the barracks have been the 60th Regional Network Control Center (Regionales Netzführungszentrum 60), the 663rd/900th Stationary Signal Center (Festes Fernmeldezentrum der Bundeswehr 663/900), the Kraftfahrausbildungszentrum Munich (motor training center) and Service Team 4 of the Munich Bundeswehr Service Center.

The northern part of the barracks was sold in 2006. Since March 2008, the facility's infrastructure has been redeveloped as part of a public-private partnership project in conjunction with a subsidiary of Hochtief construction company.

== See also ==
- List of barracks in Munich

From January 1956 until March 1957 Will Kaserne was occupied by the 88th Abn AAA Battalion of the 11th Airborne Division. At that time in 1957 the 88th AAA was deactivated and the members were transferred to other units in the 11th and others.
