= 10th Transportation Battalion (United States) =

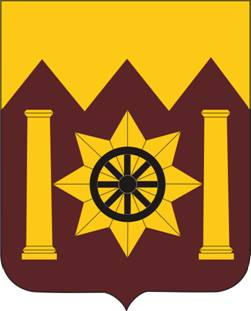
- 10 Trans Bn coat of arms
- Active: 25 Jul 1942 – 31 Jan 1947; 2 Sep 1954 – present
- Country: United States
- Branch: United States Army
- Type: Transportation
- Role: Terminal Operations
- Size: Battalion
- Part of: 7th Transportation Brigade
- Garrison/HQ: Fort Eustis, Virginia
- Nickname: Waterborne Battalion
- Motto: "WATERBORNE!"

Commanders
- Commander: LTC Michael R. Dembeck
- Command Sergeant Major: CSM Daniel J Hoyt
- Notable commanders: LTC Lydia Y. Thornton 2018-2020 LTC Natasha S. Stanley 2016-2018 LTC Kimberly D. Nash 2014-2016 LTC Megan A. Gumpf 2012-2014

Insignia
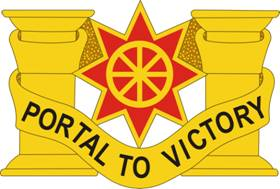
- 10 Transportation Battalion unit insignia

The 10th Transportation Battalion is a transportation battalion of the United States Army first constituted in 1942. The 10th Transportation is a subordinate unit of the 7th Transportation Brigade.

== Lineage ==
Constituted 6 July 1942 in the Army of the United States as Headquarters and Headquarters Company, 10th Port of Embarkation

Activated 25 July 1942 at the San Francisco Port of Embarkation, California

Converted and redesignated 7 November 1942 as the 10th Port Headquarters and Headquarters Company, Transportation Corps

Inactivated 31 January 1947 in Italy

Redesignated 23 August 1954 as Headquarters and Headquarters Detachment, 10th Transportation Battalion, and allotted to the Regular Army

Activated 2 September 1954 at Fort Eustis, Virginia

Reorganized and redesignated 30 November 1971 as Headquarters and Headquarters Company, 10th Transportation Battalion

== Campaign participation credit ==
World War II: Sicily; North Apennines; Rome-Arno

Vietnam: Defense; Counteroffensive; Counteroffensive, Phase II; Counteroffensive, Phase III; Tet Counteroffensive; Counteroffensive, Phase IV; Counteroffensive, Phase V; Counteroffensive, Phase VI; Tet 69/Counteroffensive; Summer-Fall 1969; Winter-Spring 1970; Sanctuary Counteroffensive; Counteroffensive, Phase VII; Consolidation I

Southwest Asia: Defense of Saudi Arabia; Liberation and Defense of Kuwait; Cease-Fire

== Decorations ==
- Meritorious Unit Commendation (Army) for EUROPEAN THEATER
- Meritorious Unit Commendation (Army) for VIETNAM 1965–1966
- Meritorious Unit Commendation (Army) for VIETNAM 1967–1968
- Meritorious Unit Commendation (Army) for SOUTHWEST ASIA
