= Transportation Corps =

Military unit

- Insignia of the Transportation Corps (Note: Adopted in 1943, the branch insignia depicts a ship's steering wheel, superimposed thereon a shield charged with a winged car wheel on a rail.)
- Active: 1942–present
- Country: United States
- Branch: Army
- Type: Transportation
- Size: Corps
- Part of: Department of the Army
- Headquarters: Fort Lee, Virginia, U.S.
- Motto: Spearhead of Logistics
- Colors: Brick red with golden yellow
- Anniversaries: July 31 (Organization Day)
- Engagements: World War II; Korean War; Vietnam; Southwest Asia; Kosovo; War on Terrorism

Insignia
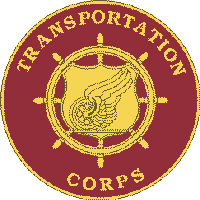
- Branch plaque

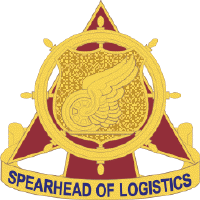
- Regimental insignia

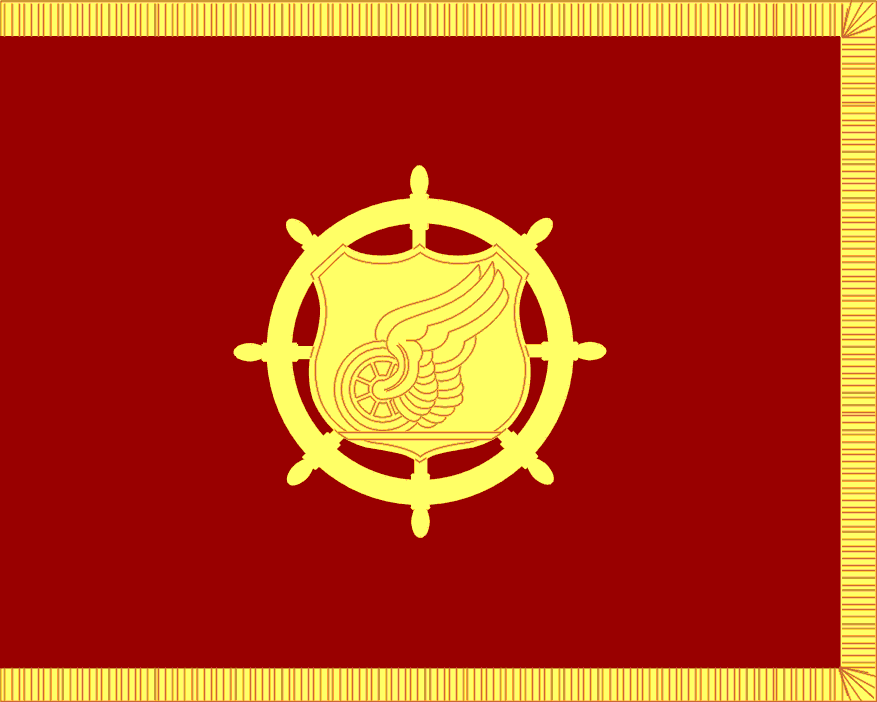
- Flag
- Abbreviation: TC

The Transportation Corps (TC) is a combat service support branch of the United States Army responsible for the movement of personnel and material by truck, rail, air, and sea. It is one of the three Army logistics branches, the others being the Ordnance and Quartermaster corps.

The Corps is headquartered at Fort Lee, Virginia. The officer in charge of the branch for doctrine, training, and professional development purposes is the Chief of Transportation and Commandant of the Transportation School. The Corps' motto is "Spearhead of Logistics."

== History ==
=== Background ===
During the Civil War, transportation proved to be an integral part of military logistics through the organization of railroads as a viable and efficient means of military transportation. The Army centralized the management of rail into the United States Military Railroad (USMRR). The Army Quartermaster purchased eight City-class ironclads on the Mississippi River in February 1862, a full month before the USS Monitor and CSS Virginia set sail. City Point, Virginia in 1864 would become the largest port operation in the Western Hemisphere in 1864.

By 1864, five of the nine divisions in the Quartermaster Department dealt exclusively with transportation. The Army Transport Service was one of the divisions that was responsible for land and water transport. A substantial number of battles were won because of the field commander's ability to swiftly and effectively move troops and supplies. Most wounded soldiers were carried away in a banana-shaped cart called a gondola.

During the Spanish–American War, the task of mobilizing and deploying a largely volunteer force to Cuba and the Philippines magnified the need for a separate transportation service within the Quartermaster Department. Army transporters worked with both the civilian railroads and the maritime industry to pull together a successful intermodal operation.

The American Expeditionary Force that deployed to France during World War I emphasized the need for a single transportation manager. William W. Atterbury, a former railroad executive, was commissioned as a brigadier general and appointed as the Director-General of Transportation and a separate Motor Transport Corps was established to manage trucks on August 15, 1918. The Motor Transport Corps subsequently conducted Transcontinental Motor Convoys in 1919 and 1920. The transportation functions of the United States Army were consolidated on March 9, 1942, into the Transportation Division of the newly created Services of Supply.

=== Formation ===
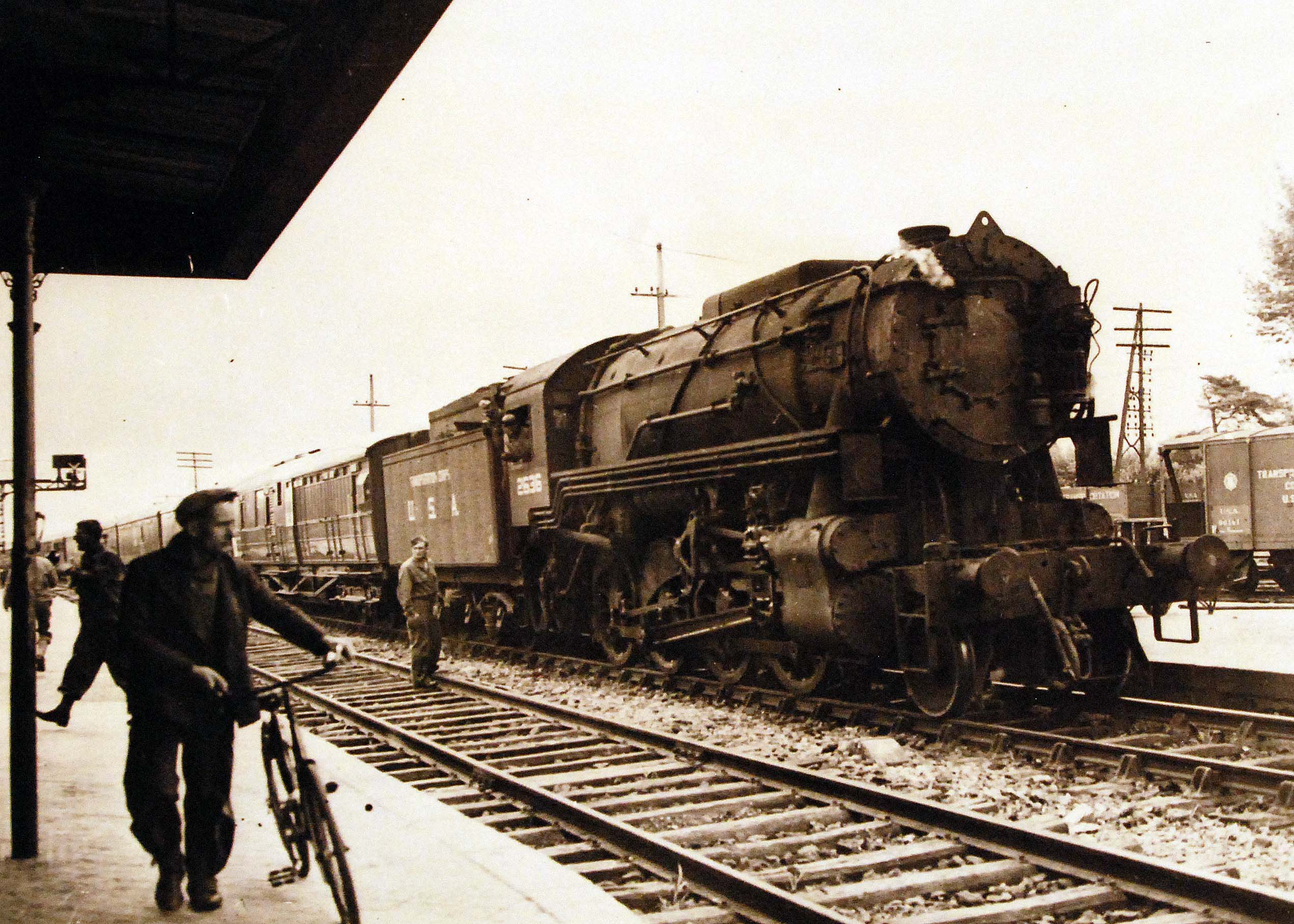
American hospital train in France

On July 31, 1942, the Transportation Corps was established as a separate branch by War Department General Order No. 38. By the end of World War II the Transportation Corps had moved more than 30 million soldiers within the continental United States; and 7 million soldiers plus 126 million tons of supplies overseas. From the beginning in England in late May 1942, the Transportation Corps operations in the ETO were directed by Colonel (later Major General) Frank S. Ross who had been selected by Maj. Gen. John C. H. Lee, Commanding General, Services of Supply (after the D-Day invasion called the Communications Zone, or Com-Z), European Theater of Operations.

One of the greatest feats of the Transportation Corps, via the Military Railway Service, was the rebuilding of France's shattered railroad network after D-Day and the transportation of 1,500 locomotives and 20,000 railway cars specially built for the lighter French track system starting with D-Day + 38. To speed the process, and avoid delays caused by French channel ports and docks destroyed by the retreating Germans, the Transportation Corps brought the heavy railroad stock across the channel and across the beaches in specially built LSTs.

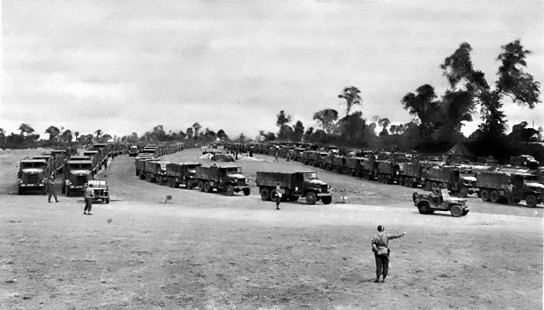
Red Ball Express: Trucks moving through a regulating point in 1944

As allied forces rapidly advanced across France in the summer of 1944, a special transportation operation nicknamed the Red Ball Express was carried out from 25 August to 16 November. The Red Ball Express provided around the clock truck convoys from allied held ports to supply troops on the front in a giant, one-way loop. There were other lesser known truck-route express operations: the Green Diamond Express operated out of Cherbourg due south, to serve the forces advancing on Brittany and Brest. Later the White Ball Highway Express operated out of Le Havre to the same depots served by the Red Ball. Later still, the A B C Highway moved men and supplies from the Belgian port of Antwerp to the front.

The story of the Red Ball Express was told in the 1950s movie Red Ball Express. There was a short lived television series in the early 1970s named Roll Out which focused on the experiences of a fictional African American motor transportation unit involved with the Red Ball Express.

=== Cold War ===
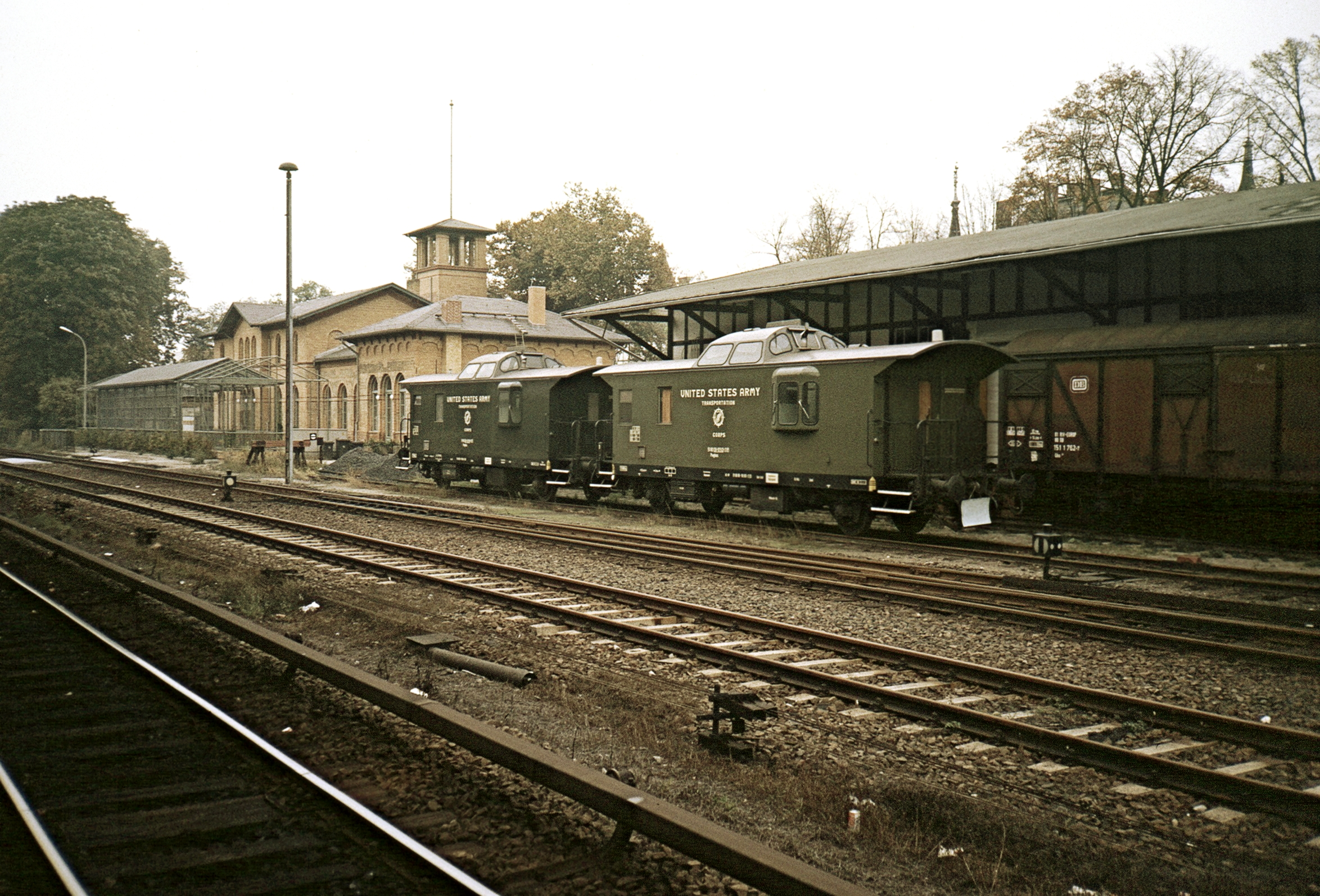
The Berlin Duty Train at Berlin-Lichterfelde West station in 1986

The Cold War between the United States and the Soviet Union extended from 1945 into 1991, spanning the Gulf War. When the Soviet Union cordoned off the city of Berlin in 1948, the Transportation Corps played a vital role in sustaining the city. Two years later, on 28 June 1950, President Harry S. Truman established the Transportation Corps as a permanent branch of the Army.

During the Korean War, the Transportation Corps kept the UN Forces supplied through three winters. By the time the armistice was signed, the Transportation Corps had moved more than 3 million soldiers and 7 million tons of cargo. The Vietnam War saw the most diversified assortment of transportation units ever assembled. For over a decade the Transportation Corps provided continuous support for American and allied forces through an unimproved tropical environment using watercraft, amphibians, motor trucks and Transportation Corps aircraft. The enemy threat to convoys required a unique solution - gun trucks.

On 31 July 1986, the Transportation Corps was inducted into the U.S. Army Regimental System. In 1990 the Transportation Corps faced one of its greatest challenges with the onset of the Gulf War. During Operation Desert Shield and Operation Desert Storm, the Transportation Corps working out of ports on three continents demonstrating its ability to deploy and sustain massive forces.

=== War on Terrorism ===
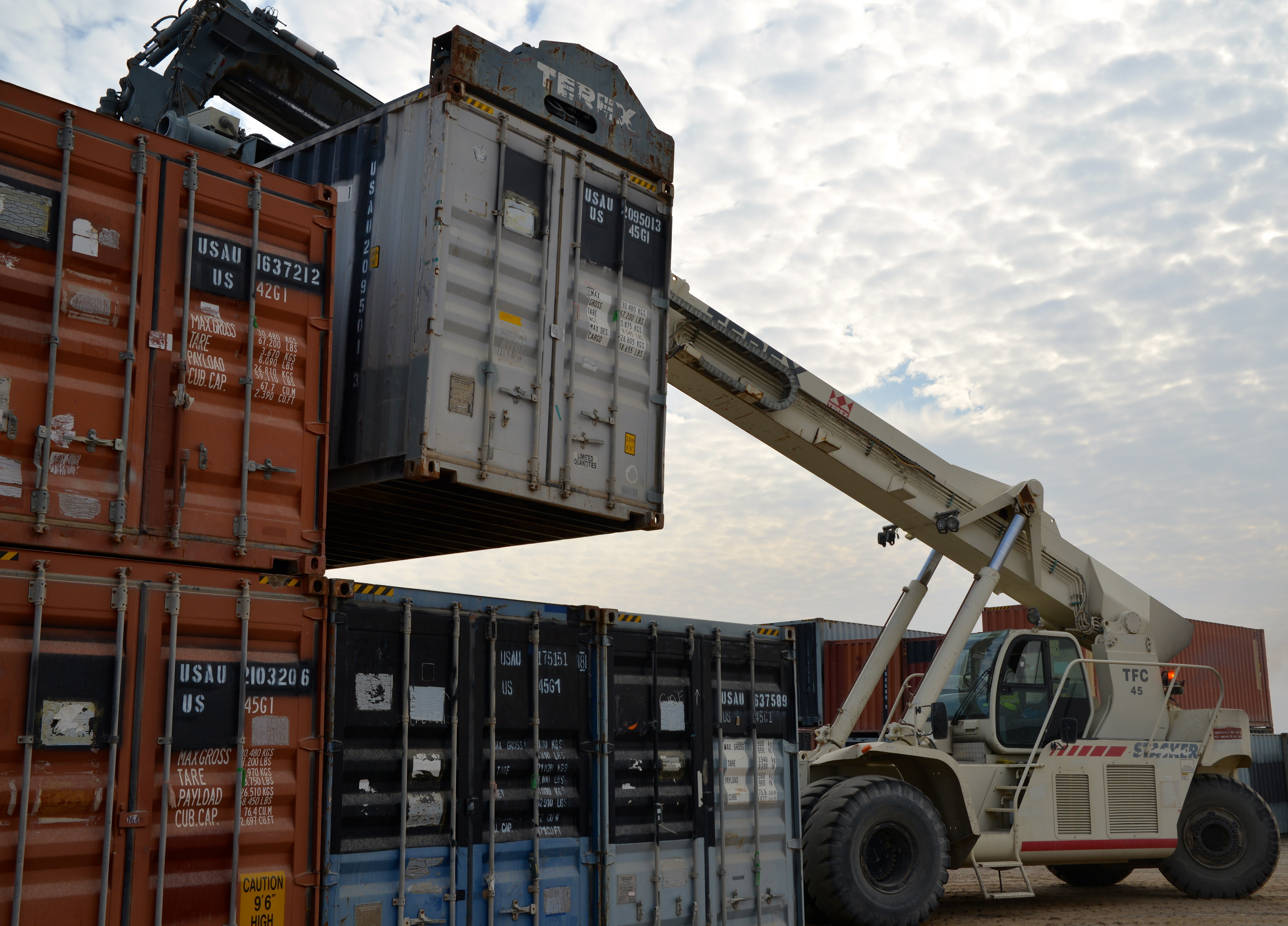
Soldiers with the 143rd Sustainment Command, inspect shipping containers at Camp Arifjan, Kuwait, in 2013

The 143rd Transportation Command opened the port and supported the push to Baghdad in March 2003. After Baghdad fell in April, the maneuver operation matured into a sustainment operation with a hub and spoke supply line. Once the enemy began attacking convoys, the truck drivers responded with an age old solution of hardening trucks with steel and adding machine guns thus making gun trucks and convoy security a permanent part of Transportation doctrine. No matter how great the threat, the Transportation Corps delivered the goods.

During Operation New Dawn, the Transportation Corps was responsible for retrograding all the equipment out of Iraq by the December 2012 deadline. Operations in Somalia, Rwanda, Haiti, Bosnia, and Iraq have also seen the deployment of large numbers of transportation units.

== See also ==
- List of ships of the United States Army
- List of transportation units of the United States Army
