= Joint Base Langley–Eustis =

US military joint service installation near Hampton, Virginia, United States

- Newport News, Virginia in the United States of America
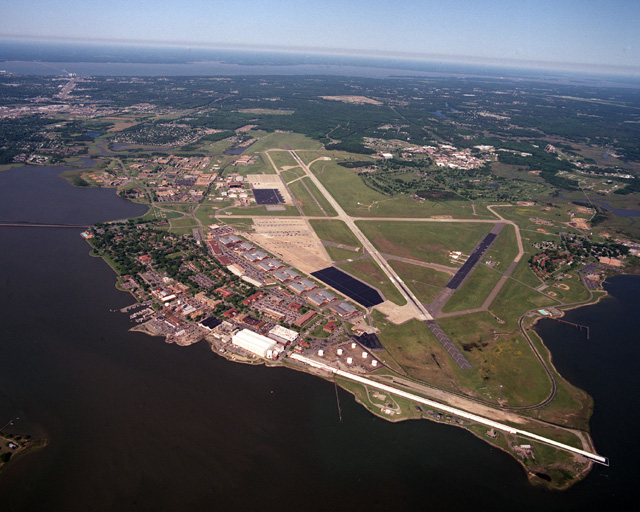
- Aerial view of the airfield of Joint Base Langley–Eustis in 2011

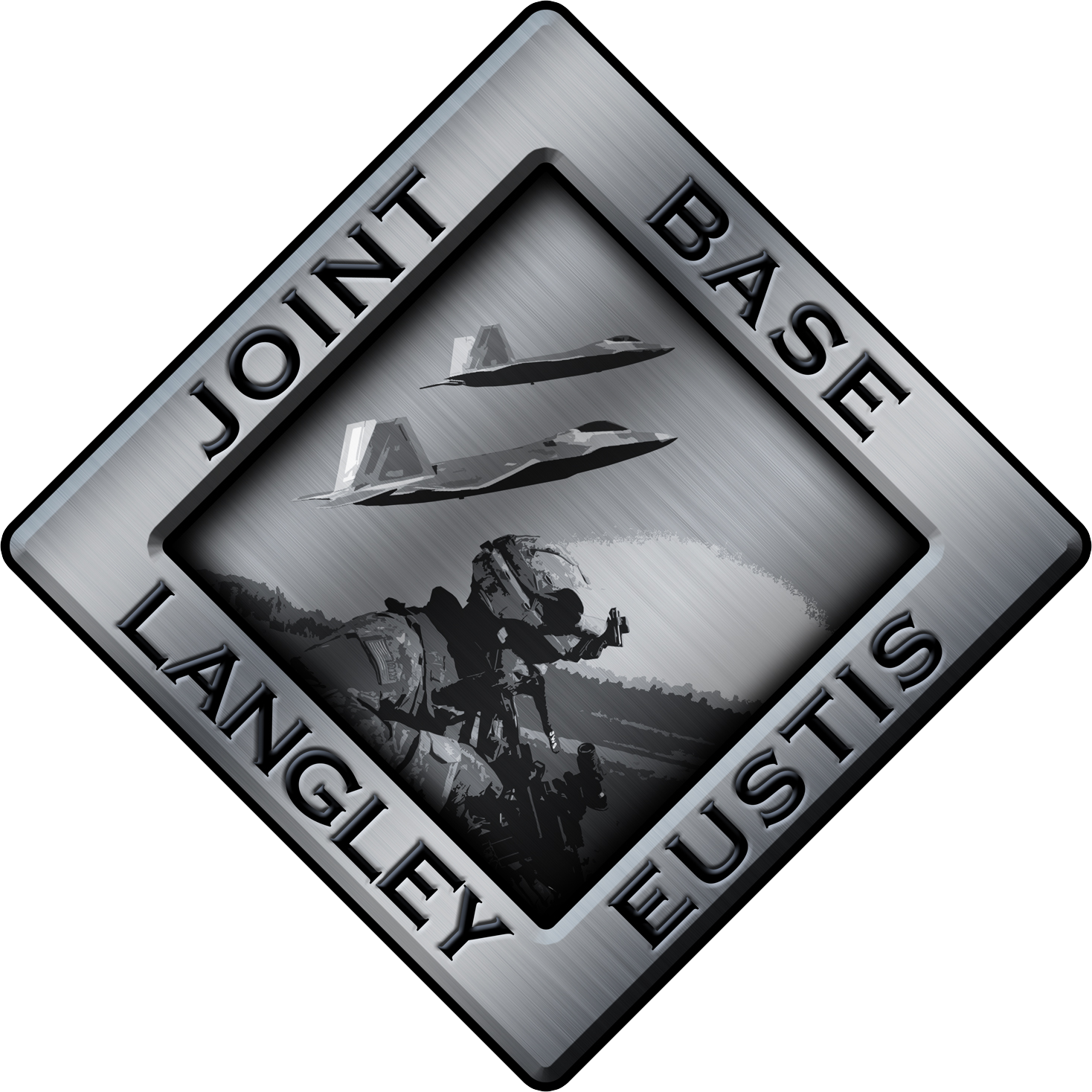

Site information
- Type: U.S. military joint base
- Owner: Department of Defense
- Operator: US Air Force
- Controlled by: Air Combat Command (ACC)
- Condition: Operational
- Website: www.jble.af.mil

Location
- Locations of Fort Eustis and Langley Air Force Bases in the Hampton Roads area
- Location of Joint Base Langley-Eustis in Virginia
- Coordinates: 37°04′58″N 076°21′38″W (Air Base); 37°09′33″N 076°34′30″W (Army Base)

Site history
- Built: 1917 (as Langley Field and 1918 (as Camp Abraham Eustis)
- In use: 2010 – present (as Joint Base)

Garrison information
- Current commander: Colonel Clinton A. Ross (USAF)
- Garrison: 633rd Air Base Wing (Host)

Airfield information
- Identifiers: IATA: LFI/FAF, ICAO: KLFI/KFAF, FAA LID: LFI/FAF, WMO: 745980
- Elevation: 8 feet (2 m) AMSL
Runways
Direction	Length and surface
08/26	10,002 feet (3,049 m) Concrete

Joint Base Langley–Eustis (IATA: LFI/FAF (Note: The IATA code for Langley AFB is LFI, the IATA code for Felker AAF is FAF.), ICAO: KLFI/KFAF (Note: The ICAO code for Langley AFB is KLFI, the ICAO code for Felker AAF is KFAF.), FAA LID: LFI/FAF (Note: The FAA code for Langley AFB is LFI, the FAA code for Felker AAF is FAF.)) is a United States military facility located adjacent to Hampton and Newport News, Virginia. The base is an amalgamation of the United States Air Force's Langley Air Force Base and the United States Army's Fort Eustis which were merged on October 1, 2010. The base was established in accordance with congressional legislation implementing the recommendations of the 2005 Base Realignment and Closure Commission. The legislation ordered the consolidation of the two facilities which were nearby, but separate military installations, into a single joint base, one of twelve formed in the United States as a result of the law.

Unlike other joint bases that share common perimeters, the two components are geographically separated by 17 miles. In January 2010, the Air Force reactivated the 633rd Air Base Wing to assume host unit and installation support functions at each location. The installation assumed its full operational capability (FOC) in October 2010. The 633rd ABW commander is Col Gregory Beaulieu, and Chief Master Sgt. Kennon D. Arnold is its command chief master sergeant. The 633rd ABW is responsible to Air Combat Command.

== Langley Air Force Base ==
Langley Air Force Base is the first half of Joint Base Langley–Eustis and is home to JBLE's Air Force units. With the 633rd Air Base Wing as its host unit, this portion of the base is home to three fighter squadrons, one fighter training squadron, and several intelligence units and other non-flying units.

Langley also hosts the Headquarters of Air Combat Command (ACC).

Langley is also home to the F-22 Raptor Demo Team. This team, who travels all over the world performing different maneuvers used in air combat, is used to help recruit for the United States Air Force. Performing in airshows and other special events all around the world, the squadron is the only demonstration team in the world to use the F-22 Raptor.

== Fort Eustis ==
Fort Eustis, a historic Army installation and the second half of Joint Base Langley–Eustis, is an area to train service members in transportation, aviation maintenance, logistics and deployment doctrine with its diverse landscape and easy access to the James River.

The installation is the training ground for the majority of the transportation MOSs (with the exception of the 88M truck driver specialty located at Fort Leonard Wood, Mo.) and all of the helicopter maintenance technicians. It is the home of the Transportation Regiment, and received the transfer of some activities that were conducted at Fort Monroe, which was decommissioned on September 15, 2011 under BRAC.

== Based units ==
Notable units based at Joint Base Langley-Eustis.

Units marked GSU are Geographically Separate Units, which although based at Joint Base Langley-Eustis, are subordinate to a parent unit based at another location.

=== United States Air Force ===
Air Combat Command (ACC)

- Headquarters Air Combat Command
  - ACC Communications Support Squadron
  - Fifteenth Air Force
    - 633rd Air Base Wing (Host Unit)
      - 633rd Air Base Wing Staff Agencies
      - 633rd Comptroller Squadron
      - 633rd Medical Group
        - 633rd Operational Medical Readiness Squadron
        - 633rd Dental Squadron
        - 633rd Healthcare Operations Squadron
        - 633rd Medical Support Squadron
        - 633rd Surgical Operations Squadron
      - 633rd Mission Support Group
        - 633rd Civil Engineer Squadron
        - 633rd Communications Squadron
        - 633rd Contracting Squadron
        - 633rd Logistics Readiness Squadron
        - 633rd Force Support Squadron
        - 633rd Security Forces Squadron
      - 733rd Mission Support Group
        - 733rd Civil Engineer Squadron
        - 733rd Force Support Squadron
        - 733rd Security Forces Squadron
        - 733rd Logistics Readiness Squadron
    - 1st Fighter Wing
      - 1st Operations Group
        - 27th Fighter Squadron – F-22 Raptor
        - 94th Fighter Squadron – F-22 Raptor
        - 71st Fighter Training Squadron – T-38 Talon
        - F-22 Raptor Demo Team - F-22 Raptor
        - 1st Operations Support Squadron
      - 1st Maintenance Group
        - 27th Fighter Generation Squadron
        - 94th Fighter Generation Squadron
        - 1st Munitions Squadron
        - 1st Maintenance Squadron
        - 1st Equipment Maintenance Squadron
        - 1st Component Maintenance Squadron
  - Sixteenth Air Force
    - 363rd Intelligence, Surveillance and Reconnaissance Wing
      - 363rd Intelligence, Surveillance, and Reconnaissance Group
        - 17th Intelligence Squadron
        - 36th Intelligence Squadron
        - 20th Intelligence Squadron, Detachment 1
        - 363rd Intelligence Support Squadron
    - 480th Intelligence, Surveillance and Reconnaissance Wing
      - 27th Intelligence Squadron
      - 497th Intelligence, Surveillance and Reconnaissance Group
        - 10th Intelligence Squadron
        - 30th Intelligence Squadron
        - 45th Intelligence Squadron
        - 497th Operations Support Squadron
    - 688th Cyberspace Wing
      - 690th Cyberspace Operations Group
        - 83rd Network Operations Squadron (GSU)
- United States Air Force Warfare Center
  - 505th Command and Control Wing
    - 505th Test and Training Group
      - 605th Test and Evaluation Squadron, Operating Location Alpha (GSU)

Air Education and Training Command (AETC)

- Second Air Force
  - 82nd Training Wing
    - 82nd Training Group
      - 362nd Training Squadron, Detachment 1 (GSU)

Air Force Materiel Command (AFMC)

  - 635th Supply Chain Operations Wing
    - 735th Supply Chain Operations Group (GSU)
      - 438th Supply Chain Operations Squadron
      - 439th Supply Chain Operations Squadron
      - 440th Supply Chain Operations Squadron
      - 441st Vehicle Support Chain Operations Squadron

United States Air Force Band

- The United States Air Force Heritage of America Band

Air Force Reserve Command (AFRC)

- Fourth Air Force
  - 940th Air Refueling Wing
    - 940th Operations Group
      - 710th Combat Operations Squadron (GSU)
- Tenth Air Force
  - 655th Intelligence, Surveillance and Reconnaissance Wing
    - 755th Intelligence, Surveillance and Reconnaissance Group (GSU)
      - 42nd Intelligence Squadron
      - 63rd Intelligence Squadron
      - 718th Intelligence Squadron
  - 960th Cyberspace Wing
    - 860th Cyberspace Operations Group
      - 51st Network Operations Squadron (GSU)

Air National Guard (ANG)

- Virginia Air National Guard
  - 192nd Wing
    - 192nd Operations Group
      - 149th Fighter Squadron - F-22 Raptor
      - 192nd Intelligence Squadron
      - 185th Cyberspace Operations Squadron
      - 192nd Operations Support Squadron
    - 192nd Maintenance Group
      - 192nd Aircraft Maintenance Squadron
      - 192nd Maintenance Squadron
      - 192nd Maintenance Operations Flight
    - 192nd Mission Support Group
      - 192nd Support Squadron
      - 192nd Security Forces Squadron
    - 192nd Medical Group

Civil Air Patrol (CAP)

- Mid-Atlantic Region
  - Virginia Wing
    - Group 2
      - Langley Composite Squadron (MAR-VA-025) (GSU)

=== United States Army ===
United States Army Forces Command (FORSCOM)

- XVIII Airborne Corps
  - 7th Transportation Brigade (Expeditionary) (GSU)
    - 10th Transportation Battalion
    - 11th Transportation Battalion
    - 53rd Movement Control Battalion

Military Surface Deployment and Distribution Command (SDDC)

- 597th Transportation Brigade
  - 832nd Transportation Battalion

United States Army Training and Doctrine Command (TRADOC)

- Headquarters United States Army Training and Doctrine Command
- United States Army Aviation Center of Excellence
  - 128th Aviation Brigade (GSU)
    - 210th Aviation Regiment
    - 222nd Aviation Regiment

Joint Special Operations Command (JSOC)

- Aviation Technology Office (ATO/AVTEG)

=== United States Coast Guard ===
- Port Security Unit 305

=== Department of Defense ===
Air Land Sea Space Application Center (ALSSA)

United States Northern Command (USNORTHCOM)

- Joint Task Force – Civil Support (JTF-CS)

=== National Aeronautics and Space Administration ===
Langley Research Center
