= Quad City Air Show =

Airshow held in Davenport, Iowa, US

Quad City Airshow
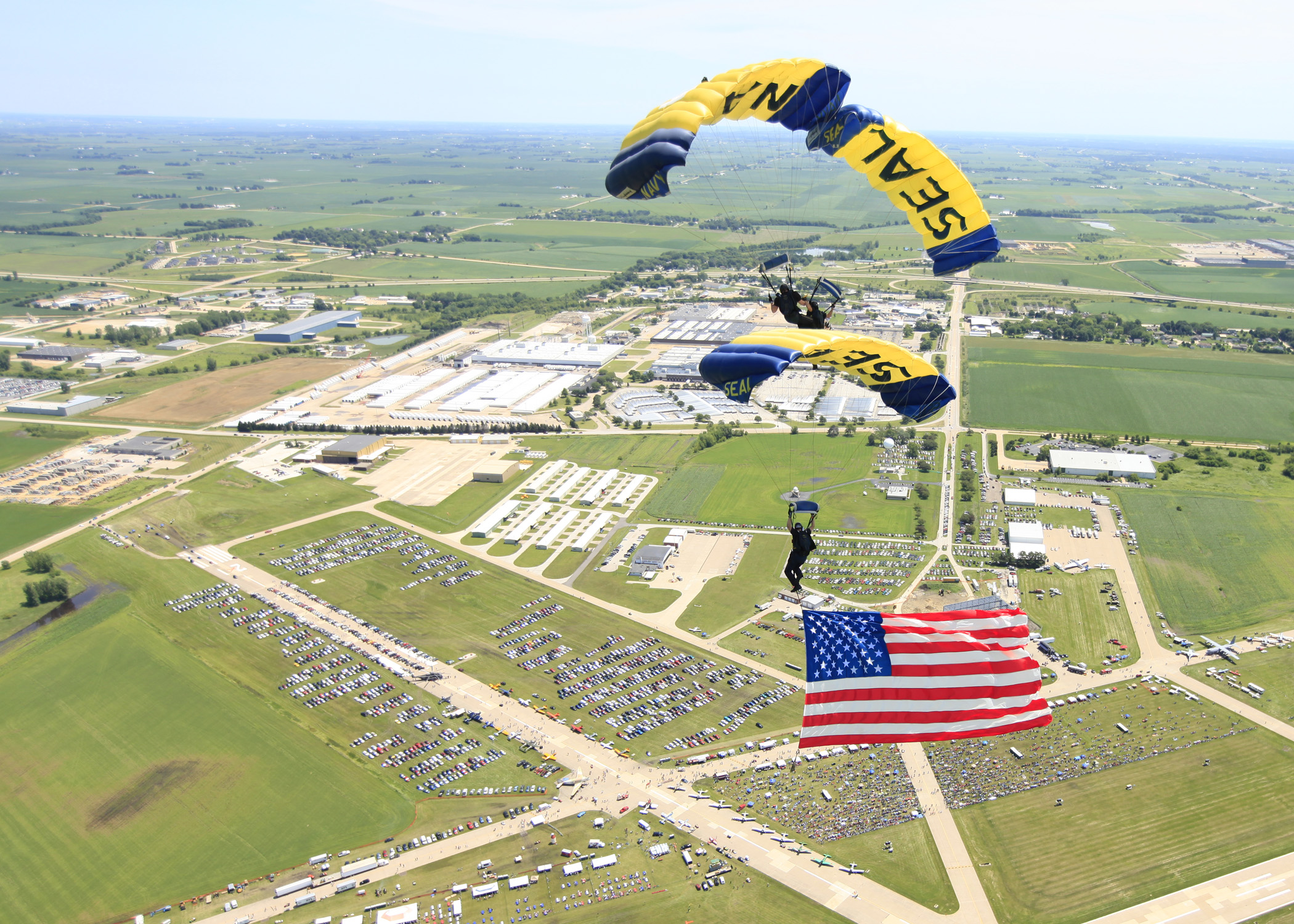
- U.S. Navy parachute demonstration team at the 2010 Quad City Airshow
- Genre: Air show
- Dates: May/June/July/August/September
- Frequency: Annually
- Venue: Davenport Municipal Airport
- Location: Davenport, Iowa
- Country: United States
- Attendance: 100,000 (2010)
- Major events: static displays aerobatic displays
- Website: web.archive.org/web/20120327231156/http://www.quadcityairshow.com:80/

The Quad City Airshow is an annual event at the Davenport Municipal Airport in Davenport, Iowa and is the largest airshow in the state of Iowa.

== Performers and performances ==
The Quad City Airshow has been hosted at the Davenport Municipal Airport since 1987. It is one of the longest-running airshows and the largest airshow in the state of Iowa. The show has hosted all of the North American Military Demonstration Teams, and several International performers. The 2016 air show which was held June 25th and 26th was headlined by the ACC F-16 demo team & Tora! Tora! Tora!

Headline Performers

1988: No Headliner
1989: U.S. Navy Blue Angels
1990: No Headliner
June 1991: No Headliner
September 1991: Snowbirds
1992: U.S. Navy Blue Angels
1993: U.S. Air Force Thunderbirds
1994: U.S. Navy Blue Angels
1995: U.S. Air Force Thunderbirds
1996: U.S. Navy Blue Angels
1997: U.S. Air Force Thunderbirds
1998: U.S. Air Force Thunderbirds
1999: U.S. Navy Blue Angels
2000: U.S. Air Force Thunderbirds
2001: U.S. Navy Blue Angels
2002: U.S. Air Force Thunderbirds & Snowbirds
2003: U.S. Navy Blue Angels
2004: Masters of Disaster
2005: U.S. Air Force Thunderbirds, F-16 Viper West Demo Team (F-16 Fighting Falcon), F-15 Eagle East Demo Team (F-15 Eagle)
2006: U.S. Navy Blue Angels
2007: U.S. Air Force Thunderbirds
2008: U.S. Navy Blue Angels
2009: U.S. Navy Blue Angels, USAF A-10 West Demo (A-10 Thunderbolt II), USMC AV-8B Harrier Demo (AV-8B Harrier II)
2010: Tora! Tora! Tora!, US Navy F/A-18C Hornet VFA-122 Demo Team (F/A-18 Hornet), USAF F-15E Strike Eagle East Demo (F-15 Eagle), USAF A-10 West Demo (A-10 Thunderbolt II)
2011: U.S. Navy Blue Angels & HopperFlight (L-39 Albatros)
2012: U.S. Air Force Thunderbirds
2013: Tora! Tora! Tora!
2014: F-22 Raptor Demo Team & Randy Ball (MiG-17)
2015: U.S. Navy Blue Angels, Red Star & The Dragon Airshow Team (L-29 Delfín & BAC 167 Strikemaster), & Greg Colyer (T-33 Shooting Star)
2016: U.S. Air Force F-16 Viper Demonstration Team & Tora! Tora! Tora!
2017: No Performance
2018: No Performance
2019: U.S. Navy Blue Angels, ACC A-10 Demonstration Team (A-10 Thunderbolt II) & USAF C-17 Globemaster III Demonstration Team (C-17 Globemaster III)
2020: No Airshow
2021: No Airshow
2022: No Airshow
2023: U.S. Air Force Thunderbirds & F-22 Raptor Demo Team
2024: Randy Ball (MiG-17), U.S. Navy E/A-18G Growler Demo Team & F-22 Raptor Demo Team
2025: U.S. Air Force Thunderbirds, Randy Ball (MiG-17) & Tora! Tora! Tora!
2026: No Airshow

== Crashes ==
- June 23, 2013 - John Klatt was forced to land his MX Aircraft MXS after he experienced an engine failure. He released the aircraft's canopy, which had become coated with oil, in order to regain forward visibility to land. He suffered some minor burns and bruises, but is otherwise fine. The aircraft is in need of repairs.
- September 1, 2012 - Glenn Smith, a member of the HopperFlight Team died while executing a crossover break maneuver when his Aero L-39C Albatros failed to pull out of a 45-degree bank and crashed into an alfalfa field while flying in formation. The aircraft was destroyed by the impact and post-impact fire.
- June 29, 1992 - An AV-8B Harrier II leaving the airshow crashed on takeoff, killing pilot Maj. Jeffrey Smith. The jet lost engine power on takeoff, and the pilot quickly ran out of runway. The Harrier veered left across a field and then dipped into a shallow drainage ditch, shearing off the nose and the main landing gear. He ejected, but later died from his injuries sustained. The jet was damaged beyond repair.
