= 10th Reconnaissance Squadron =

10th Reconnaissance Squadron may refer to:

- The 89th Tactical Missile Squadron, designated the 10th Reconnaissance Squadron (Light) from January 1941 to August 1941
- The 400th Missile Squadron, designated the 10th Reconnaissance Squadron (Heavy) for seven days in April 1942
- The 910th Air Refueling Squadron, designated the 10th Reconnaissance Squadron (Fighter) from April 1943 to August 1943
- The 10th Intelligence Squadron, designated the 10th Reconnaissance Squadron, Very Long Range (Photographic) from December 1945 to March 1946, and 10th Reconnaissance Squadron, Photographic from November 1947 to June 1949

== See also ==
- The 10th Photographic Reconnaissance Squadron
- The 10th Strategic Reconnaissance Squadron
- The 10th Tactical Reconnaissance Squadron, so designated from August 1943 to March 1946
- The 10th Tactical Reconnaissance Squadron, so designated from June 1949 to January 1950
