= 497th Intelligence, Surveillance and Reconnaissance Group =

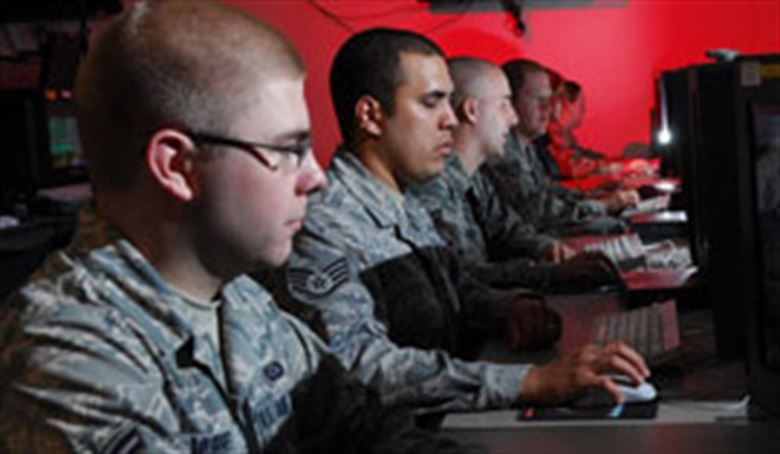
- 30th Intelligence Squadron airmen at Distributed Common Ground System station 1
- Active: 1967–1992; 1993–2001; 2003–present
- Country: United States
- Branch: United States Air Force
- Role: Military intelligence
- Part of: Air Combat Command
- Garrison/HQ: Langley Air Force Base, Virginia
- Motto(s): Pervigilus Latin Ever Vigilant
- Decorations: Air Force Meritorious Unit Award; Air Force Outstanding Unit Award

Insignia
- 497th Intelligence, Surveillance and Reconnaissance Group emblem (approved 7 July 1994)

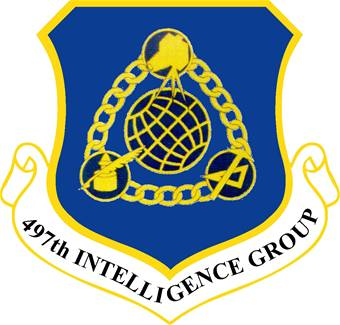
- 497 Reconnaissance Technical Group emblem

The United States Air Force's 497th Intelligence, Surveillance and Reconnaissance Group is an intelligence unit located at Joint Base Langley–Eustis, Virginia.

== Mission ==
The 497th Group delivers real-time high-confidence intelligence, surveillance and reconnaissance products and services to Joint and Coalition forces and other designated government agencies.

The Group consists of four active duty Squadrons, the 497th Operations Support Squadron, the 45th Intelligence Squadron, the 30th Intelligence Squadron and 10th Intelligence Squadron, one Air National Guard unit, the 192nd Intelligence Squadron (VA ANG), and a new classic Air Reserve unit, the 718th Intelligence Squadron, stood up to support the total force integration of the Wing and combat ISR operations.

== History ==
=== Background ===
In 1951, United States Air Forces Europe (USAFE) recognized its need for a reconnaissance technical squadron in the European theater to process and produce aerial reconnaissance materials, interpret photographic reconnaissance interpretation, and to compile and reproduce aeronautical charts and related products. Therefore, it activated the 497th Reconnaissance Technical Squadron at Wiesbaden Air Base, Germany on 3 May 1951. However, USAFE lacked resources in theater to train and man the unit, so the 497th Squadron moved to Shaw Air Force Base, South Carolina, the home of the 363d Tactical Reconnaissance Wing in July 1951.

After the completion of training, the squadron sailed on the USS General S. D. Sturgis for Europe, where it was stationed at sites in Wiesbaden while its base at the Schierstein Administrative Office was being renovated. By the end of April, the unit moved to Schierstein. On 6 June 1966, USAFE transferred the personnel of its Directorate of Air Targets to the squadron, which became the "USAFE Intelligence Research Center." With the increased mission, the Air Force decided to inactivate the 497th Reconnaissance Technical Squadron, and on 1 October 1967, it organized the 497th Reconnaissance Technical Group, which assumed the personnel, equipment and expanded mission of the 497th Squadron.

=== United States Air Forces Europe intelligence support ===
The 497th Reconnaissance Technical Group provided intelligence support to flying units in Europe during the Cold War. In September 1968, the group assumed a joint intelligence role when the Army incorporated personnel into the 497th. The next year, USAFE moved to Ramstein Air Base while the group remained at Schierstein. With the move, the unit stopped producing charts and maps but assumed operational control of the photographic processing facility at Wiesbaden Air Base. Marine Corps personnel were added to the group in 1978, and a micrographics production capability was added as well.

In the Spring of 1979, the Air Force activated an Operating Location of the group at Ramstein Air Base to provide expanded imagery intelligence support to Headquarters, USAFE. The group accomplished photographic intelligence exploitation including studies, analysis and estimates as well as precision targeting, plotting and production. Ity also staffed and supported the USAFE Intelligence Development Center and processed and interpreted reconnaissance imagery for the commander of United States European Command and North Atlantic Treaty Organization's Allied Command Europe, and specified U.S. intelligence agencies. In 1982, the 496th Reconnaissance Technical Squadron, based at RAF Alconbury, was activated and assigned to the group. It provided imagery services to Air Force units in the United Kingdom and served as a backup to the group's main operating location. In September 1989, the group detachment at Ramstein became a squadron, the 495th Reconnaissance Technical Squadron.

The Group provided intelligence imagery products during the build-up and execution of Operations Desert Shield and Desert Storm. On 1 July 1991, the group moved to RAF Molesworth, United Kingdom, where it served as the foundation for European Command's Joint Analysis Center. With the fall of the Soviet Union and withdrawal of Russian forces from Eastern Europe, the Air Force inactivated the group on 1 July 1992.

=== Air Intelligence Agency support ===
The Air Force redesignated the group as the 497th Intelligence Group and activated it at Bolling Air Force Base, District of Columbia on 1 October 1993 as part of Air Intelligence Agency. The group's mission included three main functions: intelligence systems, operations applications, and security and communications management. As the Air Force developed its doctrine for information superiority and information operations, the 497th was redesignated the 497th Information Operations Group on 1 August 2000. The group was the primary planning, policy implementation, and functional management arm of the Directorate of Intelligence, Surveillance and Reconnaissanceof Headquarters, United States Air Force. The unit also supported a number of Air Staff offices, and other united States Department of Defense and joint customers around the world. Its provided intelligence infrastructure services and security, weapons system support, automation, and information operations support to users worldwide. It contributed to development of intelligence support infrastructure requirements for weapons systems. The group inactivated on 1 February 2001.

=== Air Combat Command ===
The group returned to its former name as the 497th Intelligence Group and was activated at Langley Air Force Base, Virginia on 1 December 2008. The 10th and 30th Intelligence Squadrons were assigned to the group. On 1 January 2009, the unit was again redesignated, this time as the 497th Intelligence, Surveillance, and Reconnaissance Group. Prior to the establishment of the 480th Intelligence, Surveillance, and Reconnaissance Group, the 497th's 31st Intelligence Squadron performed duties as the Air Force component supporting the National Security Agency Central Security Service-Georgia operations site.

The 497th operates a $750 million Distributed Common Ground System AN/GSQ-272 weapons system, commonly referred to as the Distributed Ground System-1 (DGS-1) or "Sentinel-1". The DGS-1 infrastructure includes analytical and reporting elements for imagery and signals intelligence obtained through Lockheed U-2 Dragon Lady, General Atomics MQ-1 Predator, General Atomics MQ-9 Reaper, and Northrop Grumman RQ-4 Global Hawk reconnaissance platforms. It provides "all source" analysis and fusion, via the Distributed Common Ground System analysis and reporting team.

The group now provides real-time tactical and national intelligence collection, exploitation, analysis, and reporting operations providing imagery, full motion video, and cryptologic intelligence to United States Central Command, United States Southern Command and United States European Command combat operations, plans, and forces. The group also has two associate units from the reserve elements, the 192d Intelligence Squadron of the Virginia Air National Guard and the 718th Intelligence Squadron of Air Force Reserve Command. While these two units are not assigned to the group, they work alongside the group's personnel and operate the same equipment.

== Lineage ==
- Established as the 497th Reconnaissance Technical Group and activated on 22 August 1967 (not organized)

Organized on 1 October 1967
Inactivated on 1 July 1992

- Redesignated 497th Intelligence Group and activated on 1 October 1993

Redesignated 497th Information Operations Group on 1 August 2000
Inactivated on 1 February 2001

- Redesignated 497th Intelligence Group on 23 October 2003

Activated on 1 December 2003
Redesignated 497th Intelligence, Surveillance, and Reconnaissance Group on 1 January 2009

=== Assignments ===
- United States Air Forces in Europe, 22 Aug 1967 (not organized until 1 October 1967)
- 7455th Tactical Intelligence Wing, 1 September 1985 – 1 July 1992
- Air Intelligence Agency, 1 October 1993
- National Air Intelligence Center, 31 January 2000 – 1 February 2001
- 480th Intelligence Wing (later 480th Intelligence, Surveillance, and Reconnaissance Wing), 1 December 2003 – present

=== Components ===
- 10th Intelligence Squadron, 1 December 2003 – present (Note: Components stationed with group headquarters, except as noted.)
- 30th Intelligence Squadron, 1 December 2003 – present
- 31st Intelligence Squadron, 16 July 2008 – 1 November 2010 (attached to 480th Intelligence, Surveillance, and Reconnaissance Group (Provisional) after 15 April 2010)
- 45th Intelligence Squadron, c. 1 July 2012 – present
- 495th Reconnaissance Technical Squadron, 1 September 1989 – 1 July 1992

Ramstein Air Base, Germany

- 496th Reconnaissance Technical Squadron, 1 October 1982 – 1 July 1992

RAF Alconbury, England

- 497th Operations Support Squadron, 6 July 2012 – present
- 7113d Special Activities Squadron, 1 July 1973 – 1 September 1973

=== Stations ===
- Schierstein Administrative Office (later, Schierstein Compound), Germany, 1 October 1967
- RAF Molesworth, England, 1 July 1991 – 1 July 1992
- Bolling Air Force Base, District of Columbia, 1 October 1993 – 1 February 2001
- Langley Air Force Base (later Joint Base Langley–Eustis), Virginia, 1 December 2003 – present

=== Awards ===
Award streamer	Award	Dates	Notes
	Air Force Meritorious Unit Award	1 June 2004-31 May 2006	497th Intelligence Group
	Air Force Meritorious Unit Award	1 June 2006-31 May 2007	497th Intelligence Group
	Air Force Outstanding Unit Award	1 October-31 December 1967	497th Reconnaissance Technical Group
	Air Force Outstanding Unit Award	1 January 1971-30 June 1972	497th Reconnaissance Technical Group
	Air Force Outstanding Unit Award	1 July 1973-30 June 1975	497th Reconnaissance Technical Group
	Air Force Outstanding Unit Award	1 July 1976-30 June 1978	497th Reconnaissance Technical Group
	Air Force Outstanding Unit Award	1 July 1978-30 June 1979	497th Reconnaissance Technical Group
	Air Force Outstanding Unit Award	1 July 1983-30 June 1985	497th Reconnaissance Technical Group
	Air Force Outstanding Unit Award	1 July 1986-30 June 1988	497th Reconnaissance Technical Group
	Air Force Outstanding Unit Award	1 July 1988-30 June 1990	497th Reconnaissance Technical Group
	Air Force Outstanding Unit Award	1 July 1990-30 June 1992	497th Reconnaissance Technical Group
	Air Force Outstanding Unit Award	1 October 1994-30 September 1996	497th Intelligence Group
	Air Force Outstanding Unit Award	1 June 2007-31 May 2009	497th Intelligence Group (later 497th Intelligence, Surveillance, and Reconnaissance Group)
	Air Force Outstanding Unit Award	1 June 2009-31 May 2011	497th Intelligence, Surveillance, and Reconnaissance Group
	Air Force Outstanding Unit Award	1 June 2011-31 May 2013	497th Intelligence, Surveillance, and Reconnaissance Group
