= 10th Intelligence Support Squadron =

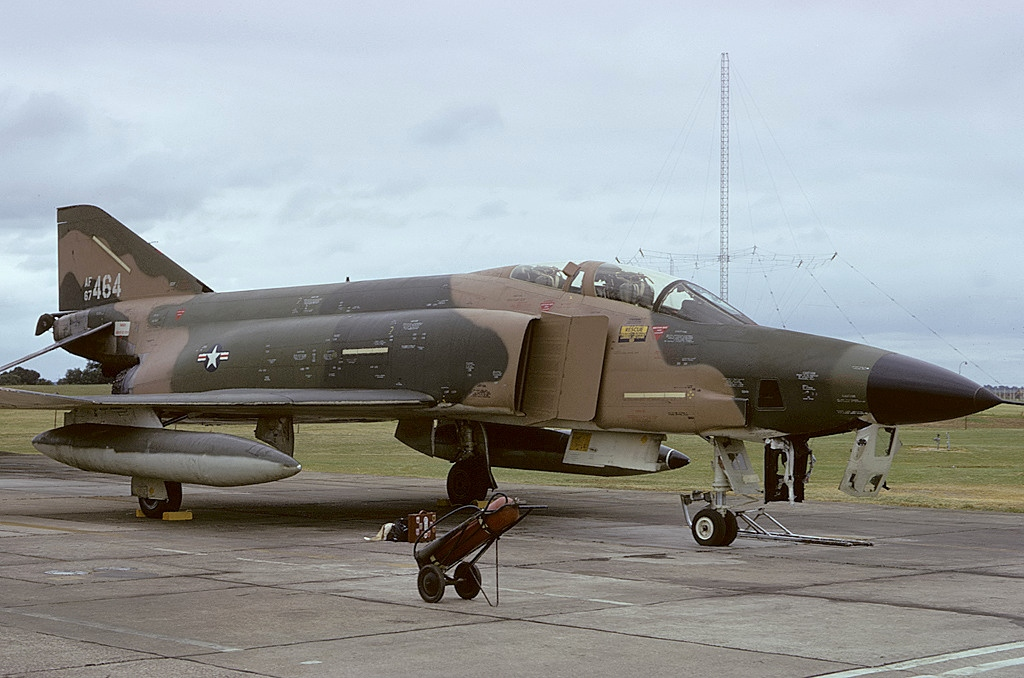
- McDonnell Douglas RF-4C Phantom II as flown by the 10th Tactical Reconnaissance Squadron
- Active: 1943–1946; 1947–1950; 1952–1958; 1965–1971; 1993–present
- Country: United States
- Branch: United States Air Force
- Role: Military intelligence support
- Part of: Air Combat Command
- Garrison/HQ: Langley Air Force Base, Virginia
- Engagements: American Theater of World War II; China Burma India Theater; Pacific Theater of Operations
- Decorations: Distinguished Unit Citation; Air Force Outstanding Unit Award with Combat "V"; Air Force Meritorious Unit Award; Air force Outstanding Unit Award

Insignia
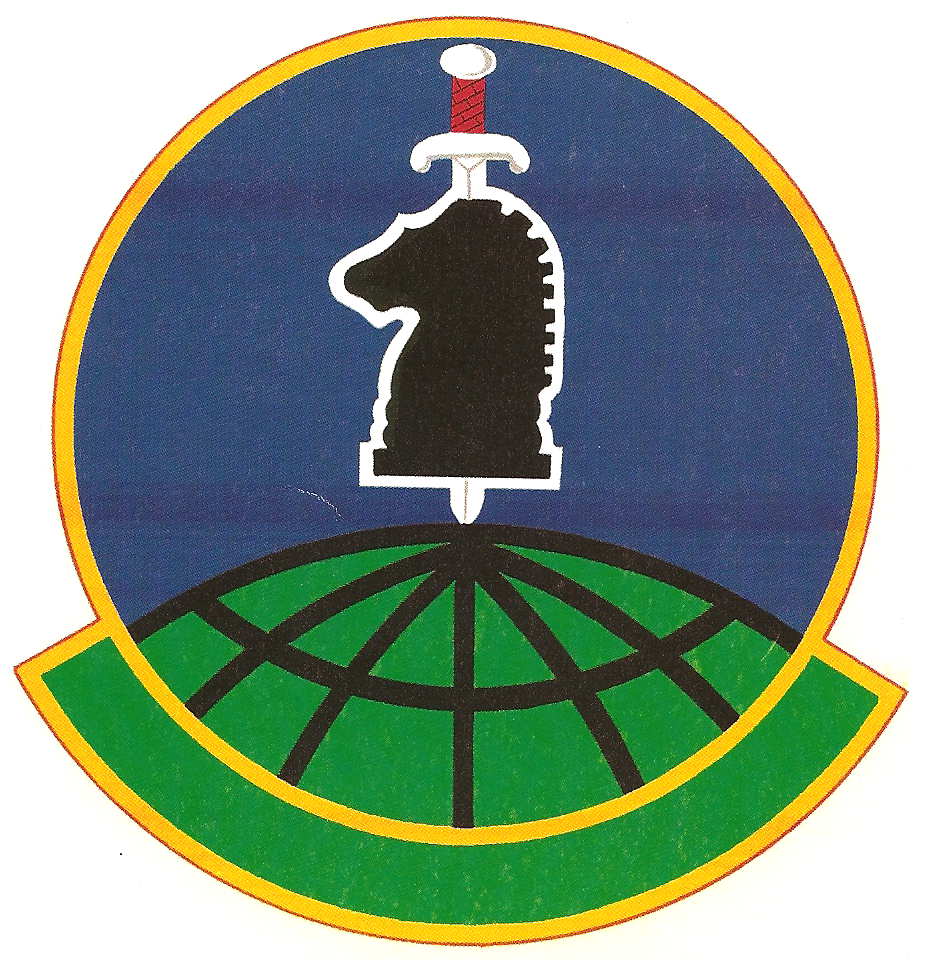
- 10th Intelligence Support Squadron emblem (Note: Approved 13 October 1993.)

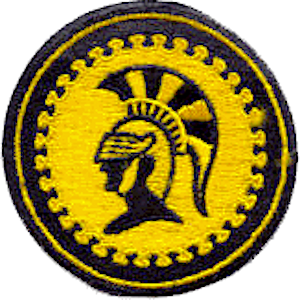
- Patch with 10th Strategic Reconnaissance Squadron emblem (Note: Approved 19 April 1957. Description: On an Air Force golden yellow disc within a black border nebuly, fimbriated of the first [color mentioned], edged of the second [color mentioned], a black silhouetted head of a Greek warrior in profile, wearing an Air Force golden yellow helmet, details and outlines black; on the helmet's visor three black lightning bolts fesswise.)

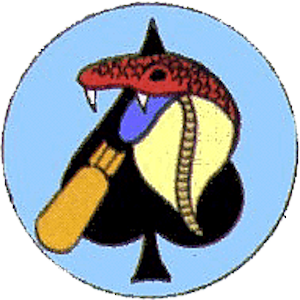
- 678th Bombardment Squadron emblem

The United States Air Force's 10th Intelligence Support Squadron is an intelligence unit located at Langley Air Force Base, Virginia.

The squadron was first activated during World War II as the 678th Bombardment Squadron, a United States Army Air Forces combat organization. It was part of the first Boeing B-29 Superfortress group formed for the 58th Bombardment Wing, and served in the China Burma India Theater and Pacific Ocean Theater as part of Twentieth Air Force. The squadron's aircraft engaged in very heavy bombardment operations against Japan. The squadron received the Distinguished Unit Citation for its combat operations on three occasions. When the unit was returned to the United States in 1945 it was redesignated as the 10th Reconnaissance Squadron, but it was inactivated in March 1946.

== Mission ==
The squadron commander provides intelligence to the Air Combat Command Air Operations Center and other national agencies. The squadron integrates into theater C4I, collects, analyzes and correlates raw intelligence products, and provides indications and warning, target and order of battle analysis, battle damage assessment, mission planning support, targeting support, reconnaissance support and exercise support for combat command elements. It also provides overall logistical and communications support to Deployable Ground Station One, which is ready for deployment within 72 hours of notification to disseminate near real-time intelligence to tactical combatants, theater battle managers and National Command Authority.

== History ==
=== World War II ===
The squadron was first activated as the 678th Bombardment Squadron on 1 March 1943 at Davis-Monthan Field, Arizona as one of the original squadrons of the 444th Bombardment Group. The 444th was assigned to the first B-29 Superfortress wing, the 58th Bombardment Wing. After a period of organization at Davis-Monthan the squadron moved to Great Bend Army Air Field, Kansas. for training, initially flying Boeing B-17 Flying Fortresses, Consolidated B-24 Liberators and Martin B-26 Marauders. The group engaged in training on the new aircraft and its mission of long range precision bombing. At Great Bend, the squadron received early model B-29s and prototype YB-29s, however aircraft were still undergoing development and were frequently modified by Boeing technicians in the field while the squadron was undergoing training in Kansas. In November 1943 The 444th reorganized as a "Very Heavy" group and added the 7th Bombardment Maintenance Squadron, which was paired with the 678th to maintain its B-29s.

==== Operations from India ====
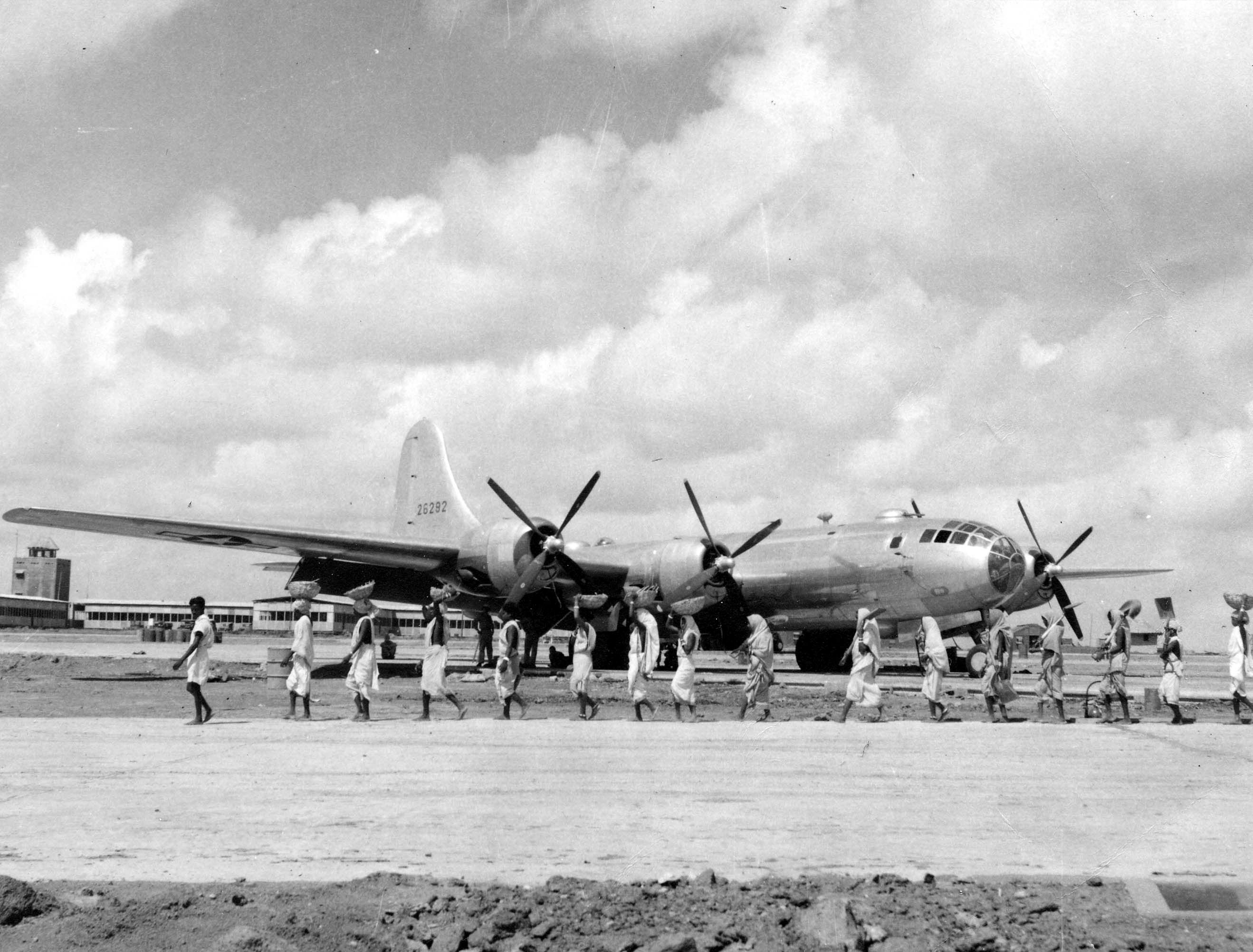
678th Bombardment Squadron Boeing B-29 with diamond tail markings used in the CBI (Note: Airplane is Boeing B-29-5-BW Superfortress, serial 42-6292. Baugher, Joe (26 April 2023). "1942 USAF Serial Numbers". Joe Baugher.)

In early April 1944, the squadron left the United States and deployed to a former B-24 Liberator airfield at Charra Airfield, India. The first airplane of the 444th group landed at Charra on 11 April 1944. Due to the lack of revetments at Charra the squadron's airplanes were parked wingtip to wingtip on the field's shorter runway. Charra served only as a maintenance and staging base. Its runways were too short for a B-29 to take off fully loaded. While the squadron was stationed there, all missions were flown from the bases of the other bombardment groups of the 58th Bombardment Wing.

From India, the 678th planned to fly missions against Japan from advanced airfields in China. However, all the supplies of fuel, bombs and spare parts needed to support operations from the forward bases in China had to be flown from India over The Hump. For this role, one aircraft from the squadron was stripped of combat equipment and used as a flying tanker. Each aircraft carried seven tons of fuel, but the amount that was delivered to China depended on weather, including headwinds and aircraft icing which increased the fuel consumption of the "tankers."

The squadron flew its first combat mission on 5 June 1944 against the Makasan railroad yards at Bangkok, Thailand. Ten days later the 678th participated in the first American air attack on the Japanese home islands since the 1942 Doolittle Raid, staging through Chinese bases on a nighttime raid against the iron and steel works at Yawata, Japan. It returned to Yawata on 20 August on a daytime raid for which the unit was awarded the Distinguished Unit Citation. Operating from bases in India and at times staging through fields in China, the group struck transportation centers, naval installations, aircraft plants and other targets in Burma, China, Thailand, Japan and Formosa.

On 12 October 1944 the group reorganized. The 679th Bombardment Squadron and the four bombardment maintenance squadrons were disbanded and their personnel and equipment were transferred to 677th and the other squadrons of the group. As the new year started, Japanese advances forced withdrawal from the Chinese forward operating bases. Unable to continue attacks on Japan, the unit continued attacking targets in Southeast Asia.

==== Operations from the Marianas ====
In the spring of 1945 the 444th and the other groups of the 58th wing moved to West Field (Tinian) in the Marianas in order to continue operations against Japan. The group and squadron participated in the bombing of strategic objectives, strategic mining of the Inland Sea and in incendiary attacks on urban areas for the duration of the war. The 678th received a second Distinguished Unit Citation for attacking oil storage facilities at Oshima, bombing an aircraft plant near Kobe, and dropping incendiaries on Nagoya in May 1945. The squadron struck light metal industries at Osaka in July 1945, receiving a third Distinguished Unit Citation for this action. The squadron's final mission was flown against Hikari, Japan on 14 August 1945, the day before the Japanese surrender.

=== Reconnaissance operations ===
==== Continental Air Forces ====
The 678th returned to the United States and Merced Army Air Field, California in November 1945 where it became part of Fourth Air Force of Continental Air Forces. Shortly after arriving at Merced, the squadron converted to the reconnaissance mission and became the 10th Reconnaissance Squadron, Very Long Range (Photographic). March 1946 saw more changes as the 10th squadron was reassigned to the 311th Reconnaissance Wing, which inactivated it at the end of the month. Some of its assets were used to form a provisional unit, the Air Weather Reconnaissance Unit 1.57 (Provisional), which was formed for monitoring nuclear tests.

==== Air reserves ====
The squadron was activated again in the reserve as the 10th Reconnaissance Squadron (Photographic) in 1947 at Rochester Airport, New York as part of the 26th Reconnaissance Group, which was located at Niagara Falls Municipal Airport. It does not appear that the squadron was fully manned or equipped with operational aircraft while at Rochester.

The May 1949 Air Force Reserve program called for a new type of unit, the Corollary unit, which was a reserve unit integrated with an active duty unit. The plan called for corollary units at 107 locations. It was viewed as the best method to train reservists by mixing them with an existing regular unit to perform duties alongside the regular unit. The squadron moved on paper to Langley Air Force Base, Virginia in June 1949. At Langley it became a corollary of the active duty 363d Tactical Reconnaissance Group. It was assigned advanced trainers and trained for supporting Army ground units providing aerial photography with these second-line aircraft for battlefield intelligence. It received a few jet North American RF-86A Sabres in late 1949. President Truman's reduced 1949 defense budget required reductions in the number of units in the Air Force, and the 10th was inactivated and not replaced.

==== Strategic Air Command ====
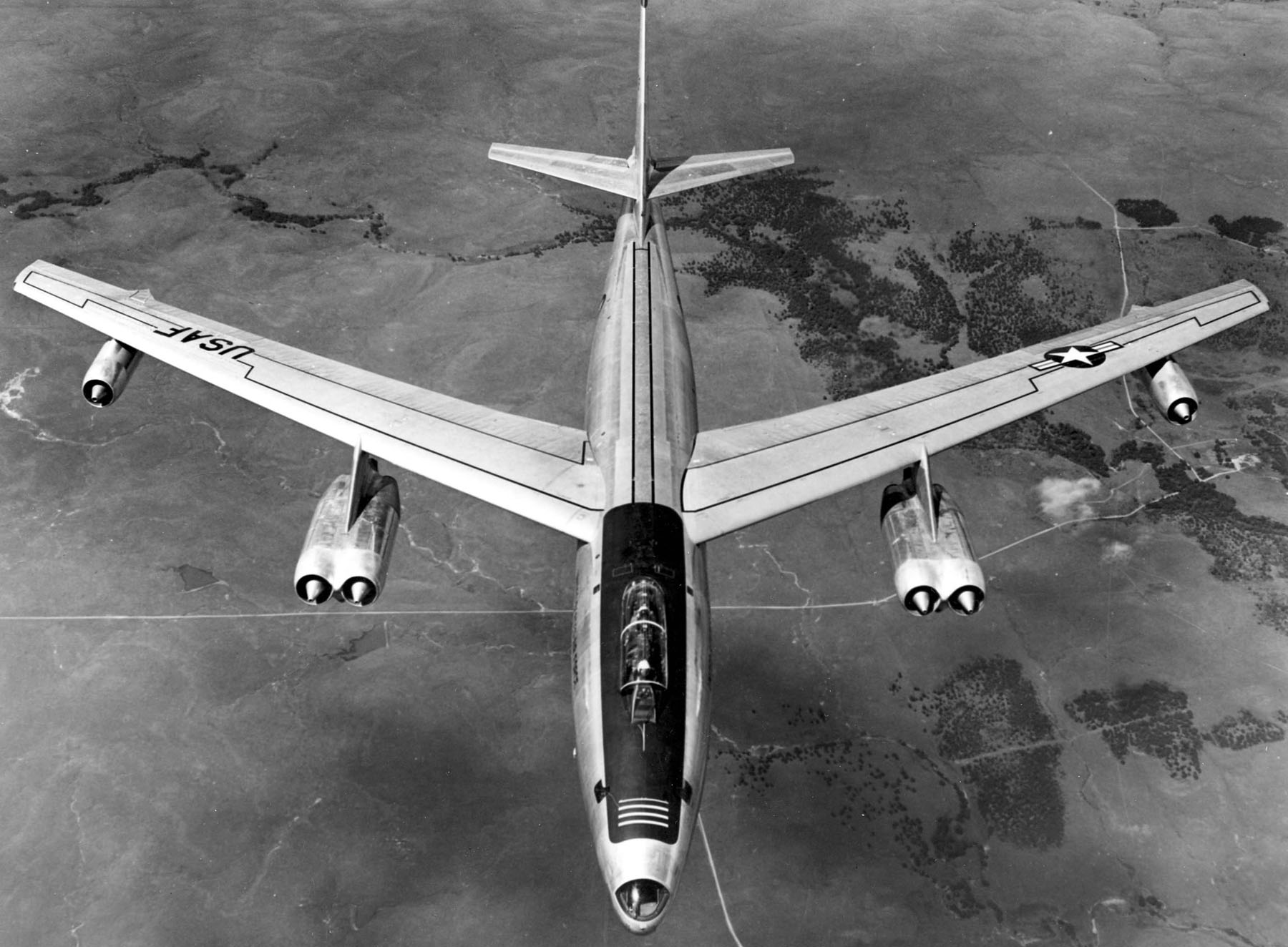
Boeing RB-4E Stratojet

The squadron was reactivated at Lockbourne Air Force Base, Ohio as the 10th Strategic Reconnaissance Squadron, part of the active duty 26th Strategic Reconnaissance Wing in 1952. Due to Korean War the squadron had minimum personnel strength until mid-1953. The squadron gathered intelligence on a global scale using Boeing RB-47E Stratojets, participating in a variety of SAC directed exercises and operations between 1953 and 1958. These included numerous simulated combat missions and deployments, ranging from a few days to a few months. The squadron became non-operational in January 1958 as phased down for inactivation due to budget constraints, inactivating in July.

==== Tactical Air Command ====
The squadron reactivated at Mountain Home Air Force Base, Idaho, on 1 January 1966 as a Tactical Air Command McDonnell RF-4C Phantom II reconnaissance squadron. It conducted replacement training for combat crew members being deployed to Southeast Asia during the Vietnam War. It was inactivated in June 1971 as part of the drawdown of forces assigned to Indochina.

=== Intelligence activities ===
The second predecessor of the squadron is the 600th Electronic Security Squadron, which was activated in August 1992 and assigned to the 693d Intelligence Wing to provide intelligence support to Air Combat Command (ACC) at Langley Air Force Base, Virginia. In October 1993 the United States Air Force consolidated the 600th with the 10th and designated the consolidated unit the 10th Intelligence Squadron and reassigned it to the 67th Intelligence Group. However, operational control of the unit was exercised by Ninth Air Force

The squadron teamed with the 30th Intelligence Squadron to operate the multisource intelligence collection and dissemination contingency airborne reconnaissance system deployable ground station-one (DGS-1). Either deployed or in garrison, it used DGS-to conduct information operations and integrate into theater command, control, communications, computer and intelligence (C4I) architecture. It provided multisensor, correlated, near real-time information warfare products to warfighting command elements in peace, crisis and war. It provided warning, target and order of battle analysis; battle damage assessment; mission planning, targeting, sensitive reconnaissance, and exercise support for warfighting command elements.

It also provided administrative support to cryptologic support group elements of ACC and operated the Senior Year Electro-Optical Reconnaissance System ground maintenance training center, training Senior Year units worldwide. It provided logistical and communications support to DGS-1 operations. The squadron had two Operating Locations, OL-CP in Chesapeake, Virginia, supporting multiservice project Crosshair, and OL-FK in Norfolk, Virginia, provides cryptologic support group support to the United States Atlantic Command.

The consolidated squadron was redesignated the 10th Intelligence Support Squadron in July 2022.

== Lineage ==
10th Tactical Reconnaissance Squadron

- Constituted as the 678th Bombardment Squadron (Heavy) on 15 February 1943

Activated on 1 March 1943
Redesignated 678th Bombardment Squadron (Heavy) (B-29) on 26 April 1943
Redesignated 678th Bombardment Squadron, Very Heavy on 20 November 1943
Redesignated 10th Reconnaissance Squadron, Very Long Range (Photographic) on 17 December 1945.
Inactivated on 31 March 1946
Redesignated 10th Reconnaissance Squadron (Photographic) on 8 October 1947
Activated in the reserve on 6 November 1947
Redesignated 10th Tactical Reconnaissance Squadron (Photographic) on 27 June 1949
Inactivated on 28 January 1950
Redesignated 10th Strategic Reconnaissance Squadron, Medium on 9 May 1952
Activated on 28 May 1952
Inactivated on 1 July 1958
Redesignated 10th Tactical Reconnaissance Squadron, Photo-Jet and activated on 3 November 1965 (not organized)
Organized on 1 January 1966
Redesignated 10th Tactical Reconnaissance Squadron on 1 October 1966
Inactivated on 30 June 1971
Consolidated with the 600th Electronic Security Squadron on 1 October 1993

10th Intelligence Squadron

- Constituted as the 600th Electronic Security Squadron on 1 August 1992

Activated on 27 August 1992
Consolidated with the 10th Tactical Reconnaissance Squadron and redesignated 10th Intelligence Squadron on 1 October 1993
Redesignated 10th Intelligence Support Squadron on 1 July 2022.

=== Assignments ===
- 444th Bombardment Group, 1 March 1943
- 311th Reconnaissance Wing, 7 March 1946 – 31 March 1946
- 26th Reconnaissance Group, 6 November 1947
- Ninth Air Force, 27 June 1949 – 28 January 1950
- 26th Strategic Reconnaissance Wing, 28 May 1952 – 1 July 1958
- Tactical Air Command, 3 November 1965 (not organized)
- 67th Tactical Reconnaissance Wing, 1 January 1966 – 30 June 1971
- 693d Intelligence Wing, 27 August 1992
- 67th Intelligence Group, 1 October 1993
- 480th Intelligence Group, 31 January 2000
- 497th Intelligence Group (later 497th Intelligence, Surveillance and Reconnaissance Group), 1 December 2003 – present

=== Stations ===
- Davis-Monthan Field, Arizona, 1 March 1943
- Great Bend Army Air Field, Kansas, 3 August 1943 – 12 March 1944
- Charra Airfield, India, c. 13 April 1944
- Dudhkundi Airfield, India, 1 July 1945 – April 1945
- West Field (Tinian), Northern Mariana Islands, April–27 October 1945
- Merced Army Air Field (later Castle Field), California, 15 November 1945 – 31 March 1946
- Rochester Airport, New York, 6 November 1947
- Langley Air Force Base, Virginia, 27 June 1949 – 28 January 1950
- Lockbourne Air Force Base, Ohio, 28 May 1952 – 1 July 1958
- Mountain Home Air Force Base, Idaho, 1 January 1966 – 30 June 1971
- Langley Air Force Base, Virginia, 27 August 1992 – present

=== Aircraft ===
- Convair B-24 Liberator, 1943
- Boeing B-17 Flying Fortress, 1943–1944
- Boeing YB-29 Superfortress, 1943–1944
- Boeing B-29 Superfortress, 1943–1946
- Boeing F-13A Superfortress, 1943–1946
- North American AT-6 Texan, 1948–1949
- Beechcraft AT-11 Kansan, 1948
- North American RF-86A Sabre, 1949
- Boeing YRB-47 Stratojet, 1954
- Boeing RB-47 Stratojet, 1954–1958
- McDonnell RF-4C Phantom II, 1966–1971

=== Awards and campaigns ===
Award streamer	Award	Dates	Notes
	Distinguished Unit Citation	20 August 1944	Yawata, Japan 678th Bombardment Squadron
	Distinguished Unit Citation	10–14 May 1945	Japan 678th Bombardment Squadron
	Distinguished Unit Citation	24 July 1945	Osaka, Japan 678th Bombardment Squadron
	Air Force Outstanding Unit Award with Combat "V" Device	1 June 2002 – 31 May 2003	10th Intelligence Squadron
	Air Force Meritorious Unit Award	1 June 2004 – 31 May 2006	10th Intelligence Squadron
	Air Force Meritorious Unit Award	1 June 2006 – 31 May 2007	10th Intelligence Squadron
	Air Force Meritorious Unit Award	1 June 2014 – 31 May 2015	10th Intelligence Squadron
	Air Force Meritorious Unit Award	1 June 2015 – 31 May 2016	10th Intelligence Squadron
	Air Force Meritorious Unit Award	1 June 2016 – 31 May 2017	10th Intelligence Squadron
	Air Force Meritorious Unit Award	1 June 2019 – 31 May 2020	10th Intelligence Squadron
	Air Force Meritorious Unit Award	1 June 2020 – 31 May 2021	10th Intelligence Squadron
	Air Force Outstanding Unit Award	21 March 1956 – 9 May 1956	10th Strategic Reconnaissance Squadron
	Air Force Outstanding Unit Award	1 August 1966 – 31 May 1968	10th Tactical Reconnaissance Squadron
	Air Force Outstanding Unit Award	1 October 1993 – 30 September 1994	10th Intelligence Squadron
	Air Force Outstanding Unit Award	1 October 1994 – 30 September 1995	10th Intelligence Squadron
	Air Force Outstanding Unit Award	1 October 1997 – 30 September 1998	10th Intelligence Squadron
	Air Force Outstanding Unit Award	1 October 1999 – 30 September 2000	10th Intelligence Squadron
	Air Force Outstanding Unit Award	1 June 2007 – 31 May 2009	10th Intelligence Squadron
	Air Force Outstanding Unit Award	1 June 2009 – 31 May 2011	10th Intelligence Squadron
	Air Force Outstanding Unit Award	1 January 2013 – 31 December 2013	10th Intelligence Squadron
	Air Force Outstanding Unit Award	1 June 2017 – 31 May 2018	10th Intelligence Squadron

Campaign streamer	Campaign	Dates	Notes
	American Theater of World War II without inscription	1 March 1943 – 13 March 1944	678th Bombardment Squadron
	India-Burma	13 April 1944 – 28 January 1945	678th Bombardment Squadron
	Central Burma	29 January 1945 – April 1945	678th Bombardment Squadron
	Air Offensive, Japan	13 April 1944 – April 1945	678th Bombardment Squadron
	China Defensive	13 April 1944 – 4 May 1945	678th Bombardment Squadron
	Western Pacific	17 April 1945 – 2 September 1945	678th Bombardment Squadron
	Global War on Terror Service	11 September 2001–	10th Intelligence Squadron
