= 30th Intelligence Squadron =

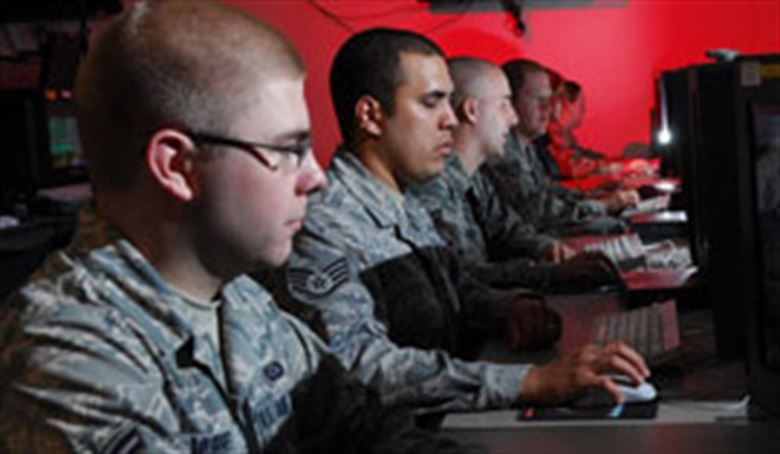
- 30th Intelligence Squadron airmen at Distributed Ground Station-1
- Active: 1967–1970; 1977–1982; 1992–present
- Country: United States
- Branch: United States Air Force
- Role: Intelligence
- Part of: Air Force Intelligence, Surveillance and Reconnaissance Agency
- Garrison/HQ: Joint Base Langley-Eustis
- Motto: We Show the Way
- Engagements: Vietnam War
- Decorations: Presidential Unit Citation; Air Force Meritorious Unit Award; Air Force Outstanding Unit Award with Combat "V" Device; Air Force Outstanding Unit Award; Republic of Vietnam Gallantry Cross with Palm

Insignia
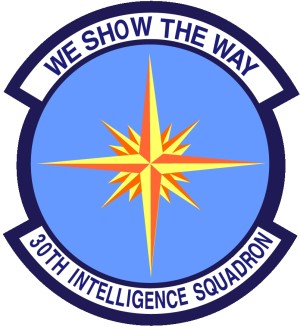
- 30th Intelligence Squadron emblem (approved 22 July 1968)

The 30th Intelligence Squadron is an active United States Air Force unit, stationed at Langley Air Force Base, Virginia and operating Distributed Ground Station-1 in association with reserve and Virginia Air National Guard squadrons.

The squadron was first activated as the 460th Reconnaissance Technical Squadron in Vietnam, where it earned two Presidential Unit Citations and two Air Force Outstanding Unit Awards with Combat "V" Device for its support of combat reconnaissance operations in Southeast Asia. It performed a similar mission for Tactical Air Command from 1977 to 1982.

== Mission ==
The 30th Intelligence Squadron operates Distributed Ground Station 1 at Langley Air Force Base, Virginia. The station is part of the Air Force Distributed Common Ground System weapon system. This system produces, exploits and disseminates intelligence information collected from multiple sources, including the Lockheed U-2, Northrop Grumman RQ-4 Global Hawk, General Atomics MQ-9 Reaper and General Atomics MQ-1 Predator, to support contingency operations.

== History ==
=== Vietnam War ===
The squadron was first activated as the 460th Reconnaissance Technical Squadron in June 1967 at Tan Son Nhut Air Base, Republic of Vietnam and assigned to the 460th Tactical Reconnaissance Wing. The squadron absorbed the mission, personnel and equipment of the 13th Reconnaissance Technical Squadron, which moved on paper to Clark Air Base, Philippines. The squadron processed intelligence information, primarily for the use of Seventh Air Force and its units until it was inactivated in 1970 and its mission transferred to the 12th Reconnaissance Intelligence Technical Squadron, which was already stationed at Tan Son Nhut with the implementation of the Tactical Reconnaissance Intelligence Enhancement Program. Under this program, the 460th operated a sophisticated reconnaissance technical support facility, designed to do in-depth imagery processing, interpretation, reproduction, and intelligence exploitation with facilities for mass duplication of film for external agencies. The 12th had acted as a command-level reconnaissance technical unit, responsive to the needs of the air component commander of MACV. The squadron's inactivation and merger of interpretation and production to a single squadron coincided with the reduction of the tactical reconnaissance force in Vietnam marked by the withdrawal of the 16th Tactical Reconnaissance Squadron from Vietnam to Japan.

=== Reactivation ===
The squadron was reactivated in the fall of 1977 at Langley Air Force Base, where it provided similar services to Tactical Air Command.

After two redesignations while inactive, the squadron returned to Langley in 1992 as the 30th Air Intelligence Squadron. It dropped the "Air" from its name in 1994. In the spring of 2011, the squadron's forces were augmented by the 718th Intelligence Squadron, a reserve associate unit whose operations are integrated with those of the 30th. The 192d Intelligence Squadron of the Virginia Air National Guard acts as an additional associate of the 30th.

== Lineage ==
- Constituted as the 460th Reconnaissance Technical Squadron and activated on 8 May 1967 (not organized)

Organized on 15 June 1967
Inactivated on 31 March 1970

- Activated on 1 October 1977

Inactivated on 1 August 1982
Redesignated 30th Reconnaissance Technical Squadron on 16 Oct 1984
Redesignated 30th Air Intelligence Squadron on 1 August 1992

- Activated on 27 August 1992

Redesignated 30th Intelligence Squadron on 1 October 1994

=== Assignments ===
- Pacific Air Forces, 8 May 1967 (not organized)
- 460th Tactical Reconnaissance Wing, 15 June 1967 – 31 March 1970
- Ninth Air Force, 1 October 1977
- Tactical Air Command, 1 October 1978 – 1 August 1982
- 548th Air Intelligence Group, 27 August 1992
- 609th Air Intelligence Group, 1 October 1994
- 480th Intelligence Group, 7 December 2001
- 497th Intelligence Group, 1 December 2003 – present

=== Stations ===
- Tan Son Nhut Air Base, South Vietnam, 15 June 1967 – 31 March 1970
- Langley Air Force Base, Virginia, 1 October 1977 – 1 August 1982
- Langley Air Force Base, Virginia, 27 August 1992 – present

=== Awards and campaigns ===
Award streamer	Award	Dates	Notes
	Presidential Unit Citation	Vietnam 1 September 1967 – 10 July 1968	460th Reconnaissance Technical Squadron
	Presidential Unit Citation	Vietnam 11 July 1968 – 31 August 1969	460th Reconnaissance Technical Squadron
	Air Force Meritorious Unit Award	1 June 2004-31 May 2006	30th Intelligence Squadron
	Air Force Meritorious Unit Award	1 June 2006-31 May 2007	30th Intelligence Squadron
	Air Force Outstanding Unit Award with Combat "V" Device	1 September 1967-30 April 1968	460th Reconnaissance Technical Squadron
	Air Force Outstanding Unit Award with Combat "V" Device	1 July 1969-31 March 1970	460th Reconnaissance Technical Squadron
	Air Force Outstanding Unit Award with Combat "V" Device	1 June 2002-31 May 2003	30th Intelligence Squadron
	Air Force Outstanding Unit Award	1 January 1993-30 September 1994	30th Air Intelligence Squadron
	Air Force Outstanding Unit Award	1 June 2002-31 May 2003	30th Intelligence Squadron
	Air Force Outstanding Unit Award	1 July 1996-31 March 1998	30th Intelligence Squadron
	Air Force Outstanding Unit Award	31 May 1998-31 May 2000	30th Intelligence Squadron
	Air Force Outstanding Unit Award	1 June 2001-31 May 2002	30th Intelligence Squadron
	Vietnamese Gallantry Cross with Palm	[15 Jun] 1967-[31Mar] 1970	460th Reconnaissance Technical Squadron

Campaign Streamer	Campaign	Dates	Notes
	Vietnam Air Offensive, Phase II	15 June 1967 – 31 March 1968	460th Reconnaissance Technical Squadron
	Vietnam Air/Ground	22 January 1968 – 7 July 1968	460th Reconnaissance Technical Squadron
	Vietnam Air Offensive, Phase III	1 April 1968 – 31 October 1968	460th Reconnaissance Technical Squadron
	Vietnam Air Offensive, Phase IV	1 November 1968 – 22 February 1969	460th Reconnaissance Technical Squadron
	Tet 1969/Counteroffensive	23 February 1969 – 8 June 1969	460th Reconnaissance Technical Squadron
	Vietnam Summer-Fall 1969	9 June 1969 – 31 October 1969	460th Reconnaissance Technical Squadron
	Vietnam Winter-Spring 1970	3 November 1969 – 31 March 1970	460th Reconnaissance Technical Squadron
