= 633rd Air Base Wing =

633d Air Base Wing

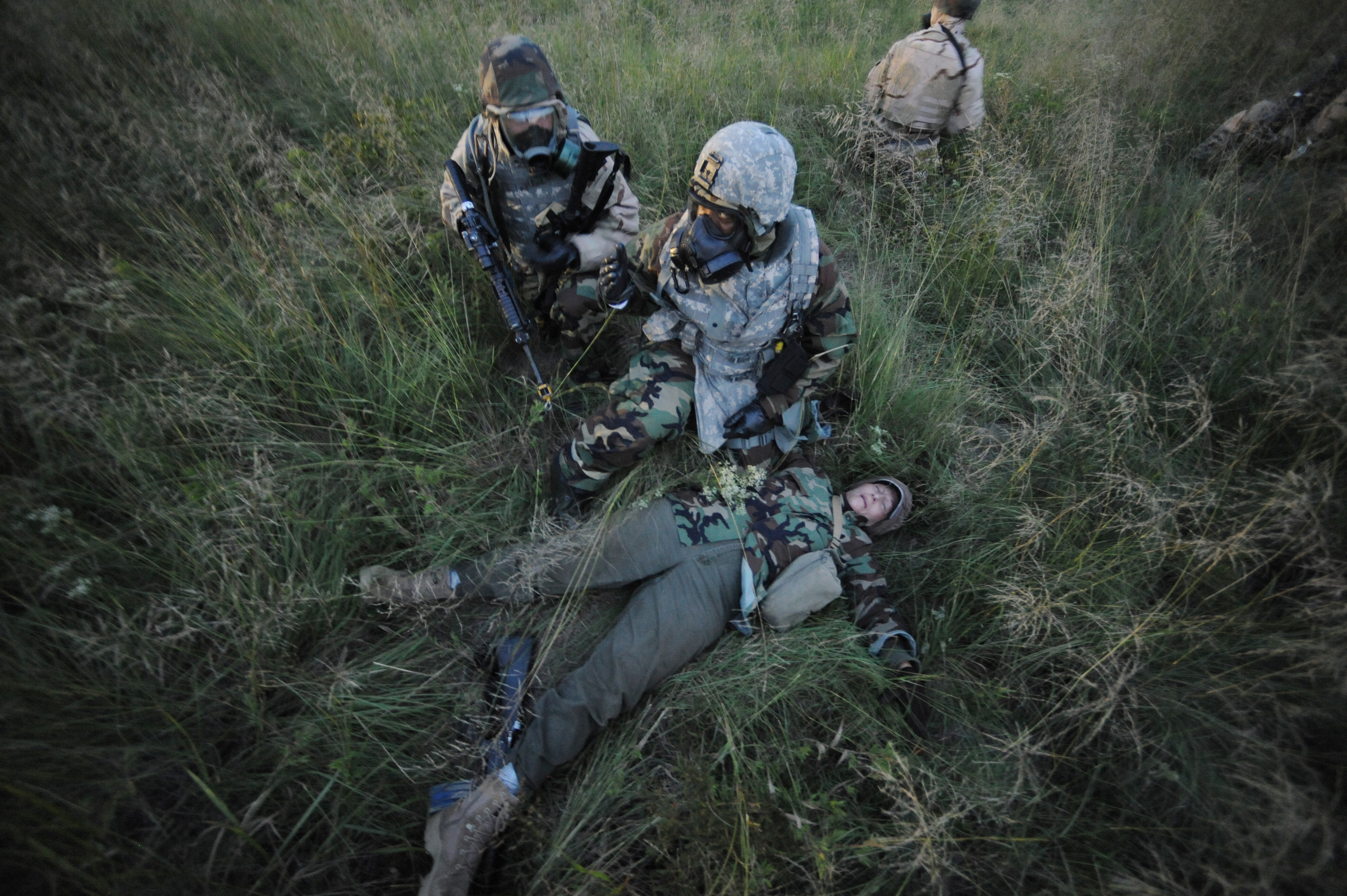
- Members of the 633d Air Base Wing participate in Exercise Eagle Flag
- Active: 1966–1970; 1989–1994; 2010–present
- Country: United States
- Branch: United States Air Force
- Role: Support for Air Force and Army units
- Garrison/HQ: Joint Base Langley-Eustis
- Decorations: Air Force Outstanding Unit Award with Combat V device Air Force Outstanding Unit Award; Vietnamese Gallantry Cross with Palm

Commanders
- Current commander: Colonel Matthew Altman
- Vice Commander: Colonel Harry D. Hung (USA)
- Command Chief: Chief Master Sergeant Greg G. Peterson

Insignia
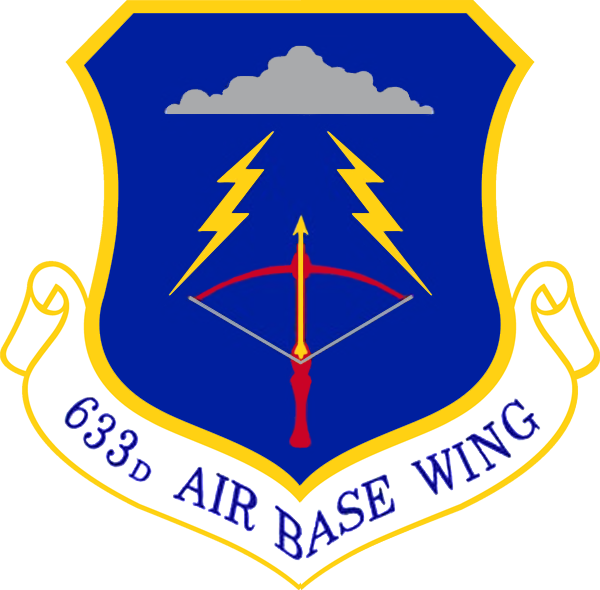
- 633d Air Base Wing emblem (Approved 25 June 1993)

The United States Air Force's 633rd Air Base Wing is the host organization for Joint Base Langley-Eustis, Virginia. Its headquarters are at Langley Air Force Base. The unification of support for Langley and Fort Eustis was directed by the 2005 Base Realignment and Closure Commission.

The wing was first activated at Pleiku Air Base, where it supported special operations and forward air control units in the Central Highlands of South Viet Nam. It served as the host organization for Andersen Air Force Base on Guam when that base was transferred from Strategic Air Command to Pacific Air Forces in 1989 until it was replaced by the 36th Air Base Wing in 1994.

== History ==
=== Vietnam War ===
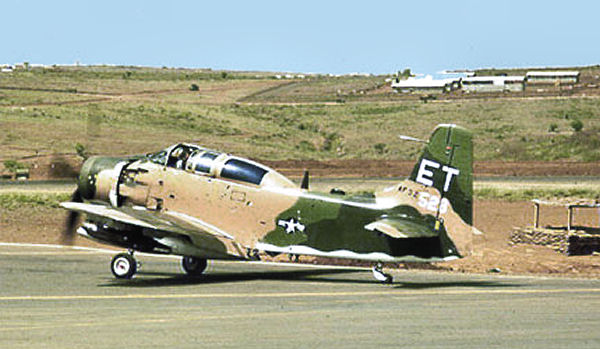
A-1E at Pleiku

The wing was originally organized as the 633d Combat Support Group at Pleiku Air Base in April 1966, when it took over the mission, personnel and equipment of the 6254th Combat Support Group, which was simultaneously discontinued. The 6254th had been organized on 8 July 1965 to provide security and maintenance support for Air Force organizations operating from Pleiku, primarily the 19th Tactical Air Support Squadron.

Operations at Pleiku expanded in February 1968, when the 6th Air Commando Squadron moved to Pleiku from England Air Force Base, Louisiana and began flying Douglas A-1 Skyraiders from the base. The expanded operations resulted in the 633d Special Operations Wing being activated on 15 July 1968 from elements of the 14th Special Operations Wing and 1st Special Operations Wing personnel on temporary duty at Pleiku to command operations at Pleiku. The 633d Group was assigned to the 633d Wing upon its formation. The 633d Wing conducted strike missions and advised the South Vietnamese. The wing and group inactivated in March 1970 and Pleiku was turned over to the Republic of Vietnam Air Force.

=== Andersen Air Force Base ===
The group was redesignated the 633d Air Base Wing and was activated on 1 October 1989, when Pacific Air Forces took over Andersen Air Force Base, Guam from Strategic Air Command. The base replaced the 43d Combat Support Group, which was inactivated, although the 633d continued to support the 43d Bombardment Wing until it inactivated the following September.

In August 1990, 633d personnel began shipping more than 37,000 tons of munitions to forces in the Persian Gulf during Operations Desert Shield and Desert Storm. – More than 30,000 tons went by sealift, and more than 2,200 troops and 2,200 tons of cargo moved aboard 200 aircraft. Wing personnel cared for more than 20,000 people and 1,100 pets in June 1991 when Operation Fiery Vigil evacuated Americans from Luzon following the eruption of Mount Pinatubo in the Philippines.

On 1 October 1994, the 633d inactivated and the 36th Air Base Wing was activated and absorbed its mission in keeping with the policy of the Air Force Chief of Staff to maintain the most highly decorated and longest-serving Air Force units on active duty.

=== Joint Base Support ===
The 2005 Base Realignment and Closure Commission recommended the consolidation of support functions for military installations located close to one another. This consolidation included installations that served different services. Langley Air Force Base, a United States Air Force station and Fort Eustis, a United States Army post, are both located near Hampton, Virginia, and the commission recommended combining them into Joint Base Langley-Eustis. This recommendation was implemented on 7 January 2010, when the wing was reactivated, taking over support activities at Langley from the 1st Mission Support Group, which was inactivated. Later that month, the 733d Mission Support Group was activated to manage support functions at Ft Eustis.

== Lineage ==
- Established as the 633d Combat Support Group and activated on 14 March 1966 (not organized)

Organized on 8 April 1966
Inactivated on 15 March 1970

- Redesignated 633d Air Base Wing on 11 July 1989

Activated on 1 October 1989
Inactivated on 1 October 1994
Activated on 7 January 2010

=== Assignments ===
- Pacific Air Forces, 14 March 1966 (not organized)
- Seventh Air Force, 8 April 1966
- 633d Special Operations Wing, 15 July 1968 – 15 March 1970
- Thirteenth Air Force, 1 October 1989 – 1 October 1994
- Ninth Air Force, 7 January 2010 – 20 August 2020
- Fifteenth Air Force, 20 August 2020 – present

=== Components ===
Groups

- 633d Logistics Group: 1 April 1992 – 1 October 1994
- 633d Medical Group: 1 October 1989 – 1 October 1994, 7 January 2010 – present
- 633d Operations Group: 1 April 1992 – 1 October 1994
- 633d Support Group (later 633d Mission Support Group): 1 April 1992 – 1 October 1994, 7 January 2010 – present
- 733d Mission Support Group: 29 January 2010 – present

Squadrons

- 27th Communications Squadron (later 633d Communications Squadron): 1 October 1990 – 1 April 1992
- 633d Air Police Squadron (later 633d Security Police Squadron): 8 June 1966 – 15 March 1970, 1 October 1989 – 1 April 1992
- 633d Civil Engineering Squadron: 15 January 1967 – 15 March 1970, 1 October 1989 – 1 April 1992
- 633d Comptroller Squadron: 1 October 1989 – 16 October 1991, 7 January 2010 – present
- 633d Consolidated Aircraft Maintenance Squadron: 8 April 1966 – 15 July 1968, 30 June 1990 – 1 April 1992
- 633d Mission Support Squadron: 1 October 1989 – 1 April 1992
- 633d Services Squadron (later 633d MWR and Services Squadron): 1 October 1989 – 1 April 1992
- 633d Supply Squadron: 15 January 1967 – 15 July 1968, 1 October 1989 – 1 April 1992
- 633d Transportation Squadron: 1 October 1989 – 1 April 1992
- 733d Logistics Readiness Squadron (Current)

Other

- 633d USAF Dispensary, 15 January 1967 – 15 July 1968

=== Stations ===
- Pleiku Air Base, South Vietnam, 8 April 1966 – 15 March 1970
- Andersen Air Force Base, Guam, 1 October 1989 – 1 October 1994
- Langley Air Force Base, Virginia, 7 January 2010 – present

=== Awards and campaigns ===
Award streamer	Award	Dates	Notes
	Air Force Outstanding Unit Award with Combat "V" Device	8 April 1966 – 30 April 1967	633d Combat Support Group
	Air Force Outstanding Unit Award with Combat "V" Device	15 July 1968 – 31 May 1969	633d Combat Support Group
	Air Force Outstanding Unit Award	3 June 1990 – 1 June 1992	633d Air Base Wing
	Air Force Outstanding Unit Award	1 August 1992 – 31 July 1994	633d Air Base Wing
	Air Force Outstanding Unit Award	1 June 2014 – 31 May 2016	633d Air Base Wing
	Vietnamese Gallantry Cross with Palm	[8] April 1966 – 15 March 1970	633d Combat Support Group

Campaign Streamer	Campaign	Dates	Notes
	Vietnam Air	8 April 1966 – 28 June 1966	633d Combat Support Group
	Vietnam Air Offensive	29 June 1966 – 8 March 1967	633d Combat Support Group
	Vietnam Air Offensive, Phase II	9 March 1967 – 31 March 1968	633d Combat Support Group
	Vietnam Air/Ground	22 January 1968 – 7 July 1968	633d Combat Support Group
	Vietnam Air Offensive, Phase III	1 April 1968 – 31 October 1968	633d Combat Support Group
	Vietnam Air Offensive, Phase IV	1 November 1968 – 22 February 1969	633d Combat Support Group
	Tet 1969/Counteroffensive	23 February 1969 – 8 June 1969	633d Combat Support Group
	Vietnam Summer-Fall 1969	9 June 1969 – 31 October 1969	633d Combat Support Group
	Vietnam Winter-Spring 1970	3 November 1969 – 15 March 1970	633d Combat Support Group
