= 7455th Tactical Intelligence Wing =

United States Air Force military unit

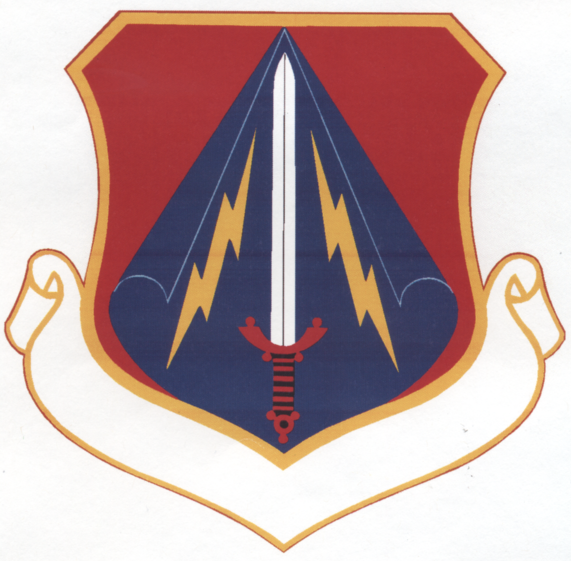
- Emblem of the 7455th Tactical Intelligence Wing
- Active: 1985–1992
- Country: United States
- Branch: United States Air Force
- Type: Intelligence

The 7455th Tactical Intelligence Wing is an inactive United States Air Force unit. It was last assigned to the United States Air Forces in Europe, stationed at Ramstein Air Base, Germany. The unit was inactivated on 1 July 1992.

The wing was activated to provide HQ USAFE with centralized command and control for a variety of intelligence units in Europe. The Wing Commander was dual hatted as the HQ USAFE Deputy Chief of Staff, Intelligence. The last commander of the 7455th TIW was Brigadier General Charles L. Bishop.

It was established on 1 September 1985, and inactivated on 1 July 1992

== Assignments ==
- United States Air Forces in Europe, 1 September 1985 – 1 July 1992.

== Components ==
- 497th Reconnaissance Technical Group, Schierstein Kaserne, Wiesbaden

496th Reconnaissance Technical Squadron, RAF Alconbury

- 7450th Tactical Intelligence Squadron, Ramstein AB
- 7451st Tactical Intelligence Squadron, Wueschheim AS
- 7453d Tactical Electronics Squadron, Lindsey AS
- 7454th Tactical Intelligence Squadron, Boerfink MTK
- 7456th Tactical Intelligence Squadron, Ramstein AB
- 7542d Tactical Electronics Squadron, Ramstein AB

== Stations ==
- Ramstein AB, West Germany, 1 September 1985 – 1 July 1992
