= Davenport Municipal Airport (Iowa) =

Airport in Iowa, United States

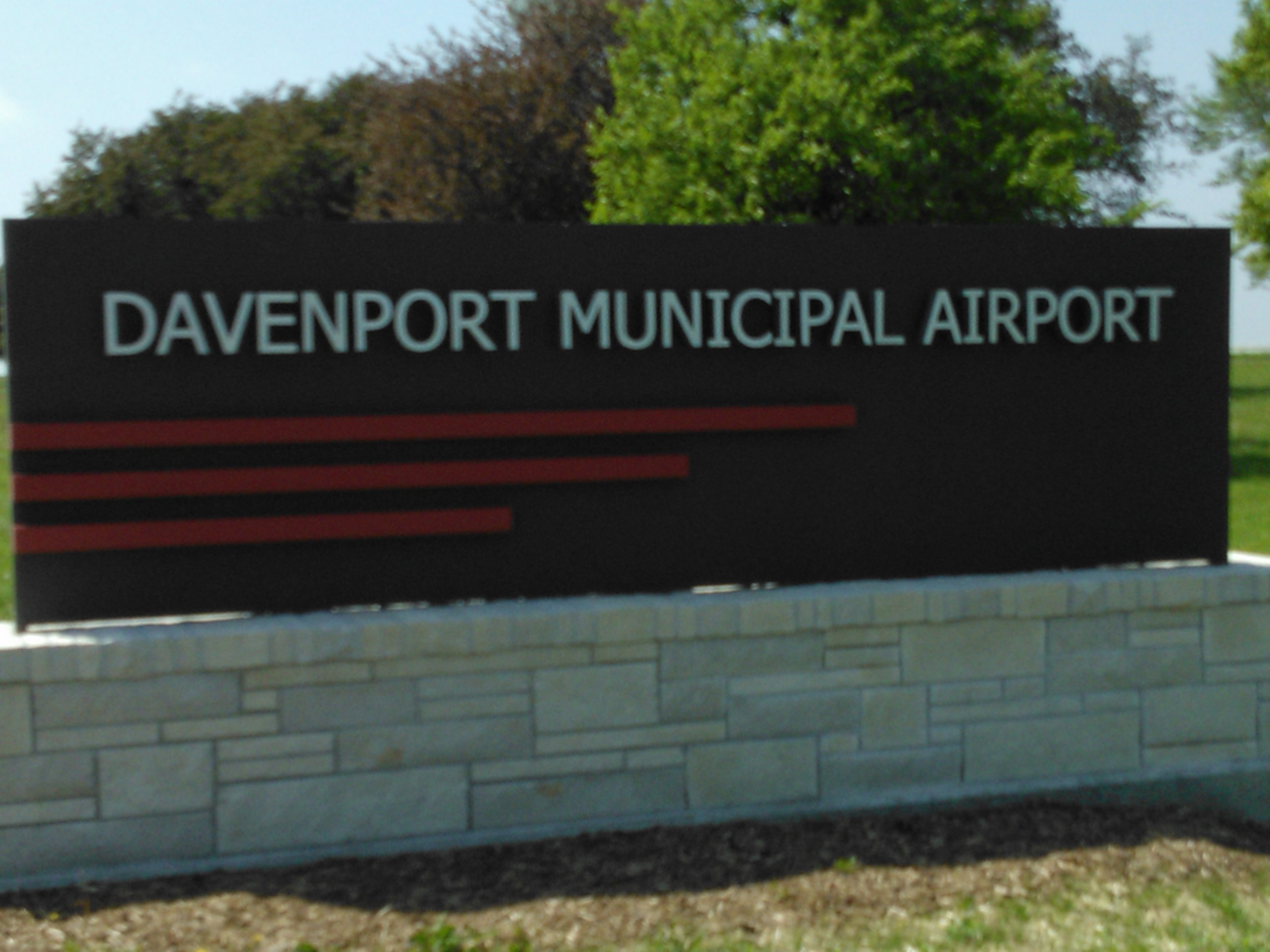
- IATA: DVN; ICAO: KDVN; FAA LID: DVN

Summary
- Airport type: Public
- Owner: City of Davenport
- Serves: Davenport, Iowa
- Elevation AMSL: 753 ft (230 m)
- Coordinates: 41°36′37″N 090°35′18″W
- Website: Davenport Municipal Airport

Map
- Location of airport in Iowa DVN (the United States)

Runways
Direction	Length		Surface
Direction	ft	m	Surface
15/33	5,511	1,677	Concrete
3/21	4,001	1,220	Concrete

Statistics
- Aircraft operations (2022): 50,850
- Based aircraft (2023): 123
- Source: Federal Aviation Administration

Davenport Municipal Airport (IATA: DVN, ICAO: KDVN, FAA LID: DVN) is a general aviation airport located about 7 miles (11 km) north of downtown Davenport, a city in Scott County, Iowa, United States. The airport, which dates back to 1948, has been home to the Quad City Air Show since 1987.

The fixed-base operation is run by Revv Aviation. The airport has two runways (3-21 and 15-33) and a 12,000-square-foot (1,100 m^{2}) hangar. Most of the air traffic in and out of Davenport Municipal is regional (commercial flights in the area are generally handled by Quad City International Airport), consisting mainly of single-engine prop and twin-engine prop aircraft. However, some smaller private jets also utilize the airport for longer trips to other destinations around the United States. The National Oceanic and Atmospheric Administration operates the Quad Cities National Weather Service office from Davenport Municipal Airport. Also the U.S. Army Iowa National Guard 1/109th Aviation Battalion Maintains an Armory with three-four CH-47F Chinook and two Eurocopter UH-72 Lakota Helicopters.

== Facilities and aircraft ==
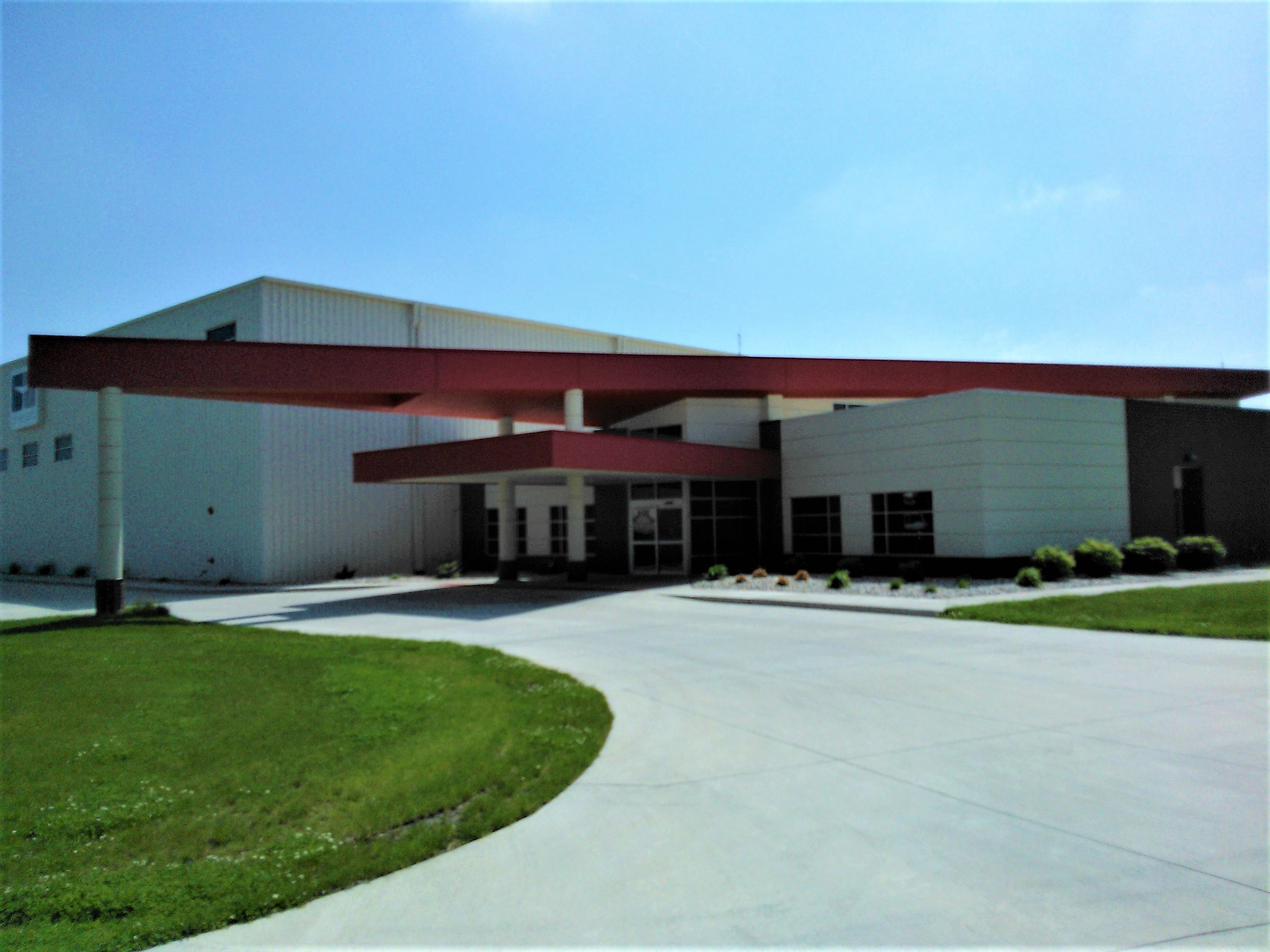
Terminal

Davenport Municipal Airport covers an area of 764 acres (309 ha) and contains two concrete paved runways: 15/33 measuring 5,511 x 100 ft (1,677 x 30 m) and 3/21 measuring 4,001 x 100 ft (1,220 x 30 m). Runway 15 is equipped with an ILS system as well as MALSR lighting, and is the designated calm wind runway. All runways have RNAV approaches with medium to high intensity runway edge lighting with VASI glide slope indicators (GS 3.0 degrees) with left traffic patterns. Runways 3/21 have a VOR approach from the Davenport VORTAC (DVN, 113.8) (located off-field).

For the 12-month period ending April 18, 2022, the airport had 50,850 aircraft operations, an average of 139 per day: 94% general aviation, 4% air taxi and 2% military. In March 2023, there were 123 aircraft based at this airport: 91 single-engine, 14 multi-engine, 5 jet, 1 glider and 12 military.

In January 2011 a new 7,460 square foot (690 m^{2}) terminal with an attached 20,000 square foot (1,900 m^{2}) hangar was opened. It was constructed by Carver Aero for a cost of $3 million. In addition to Carver's operations the facility includes a pilots’ lounge, a flight planning room, a business center and conference rooms. The airport's old 1950s era terminal was torn down as part of this construction project.

In 2012, the airport received a $63,000 grant from the U.S. Department of Transportation for an environmental impact study. The study was for an upcoming project that includes the extension of runway 15/33, the main northwest-southeast runway, from 5,511 feet (1,680 m) to 6,900 feet (2,100 m) with new taxiways.

The local fixed-base operator Carver Aero offers flight charter, aircraft rental, and flight training, as well as line and maintenance services. Their nine-aircraft fleet consists of one Cessna Citation V, one King Air 350, one King Air 200, one Cessna 172P, and five Piper PA-28s (two Warriors, two 140s, and one Archer).

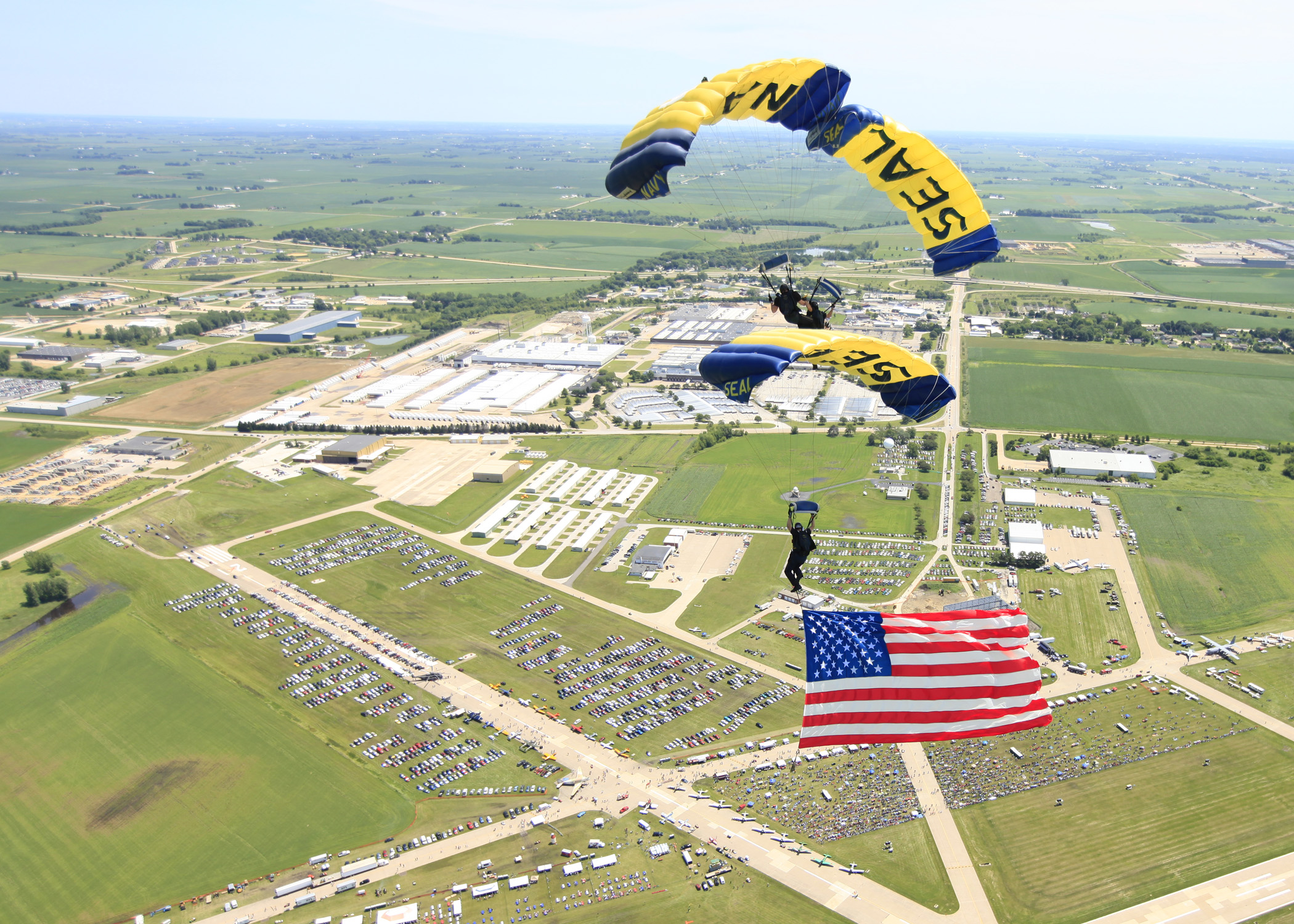
U.S. Navy parachute demonstration team at the 2010 Quad City Airshow

The airport also has an Automated Surface Observation System (ASOS) on channel 120.175. The airport's combined CTAF and UNICOM is on channel 123.00. The facility is usually staffed from 06:30 to dusk. There is a 24/7 self-serve fuel pump on-site with 100LL.

== Quad City Air Show ==
The Quad City Air Show is hosted at the Davenport Municipal Airport, and started in 1987. It is one of the longest continuous running airshows, and the largest in the state of Iowa. The show has hosted all of the North American military demonstration teams and several international performers.

== See also ==
- List of airports in Iowa
