= 128th Aviation Brigade =

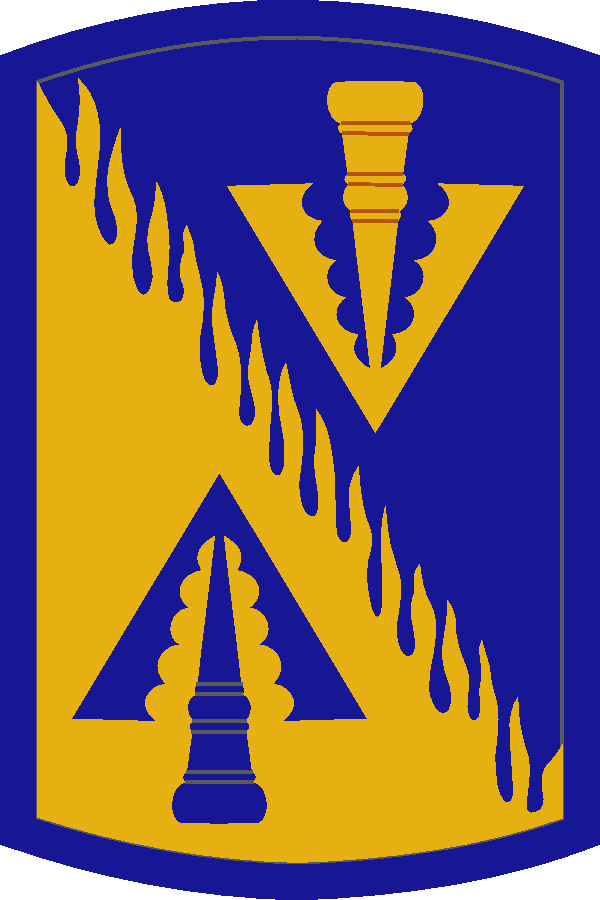
- Shoulder sleeve insignia
- Active: 1990–1995; 2012 – present
- Country: United States
- Branch: United States Army
- Type: Aviation brigade
- Role: Aviation
- Size: Brigade
- Part of: United States Army Aviation Center of Excellence
- Garrison/HQ: Joint Base Langley–Eustis
- Motto: "Born Under Fire"

Commanders
- Brigade Commander: Col. Robert S. Holcroft
- Command Chief Warrant Officer: CW5 Travis R. Michael
- Command Sergeant Major: CSM Susie S. Nu'uvali

Insignia
- Distinctive unit insignia

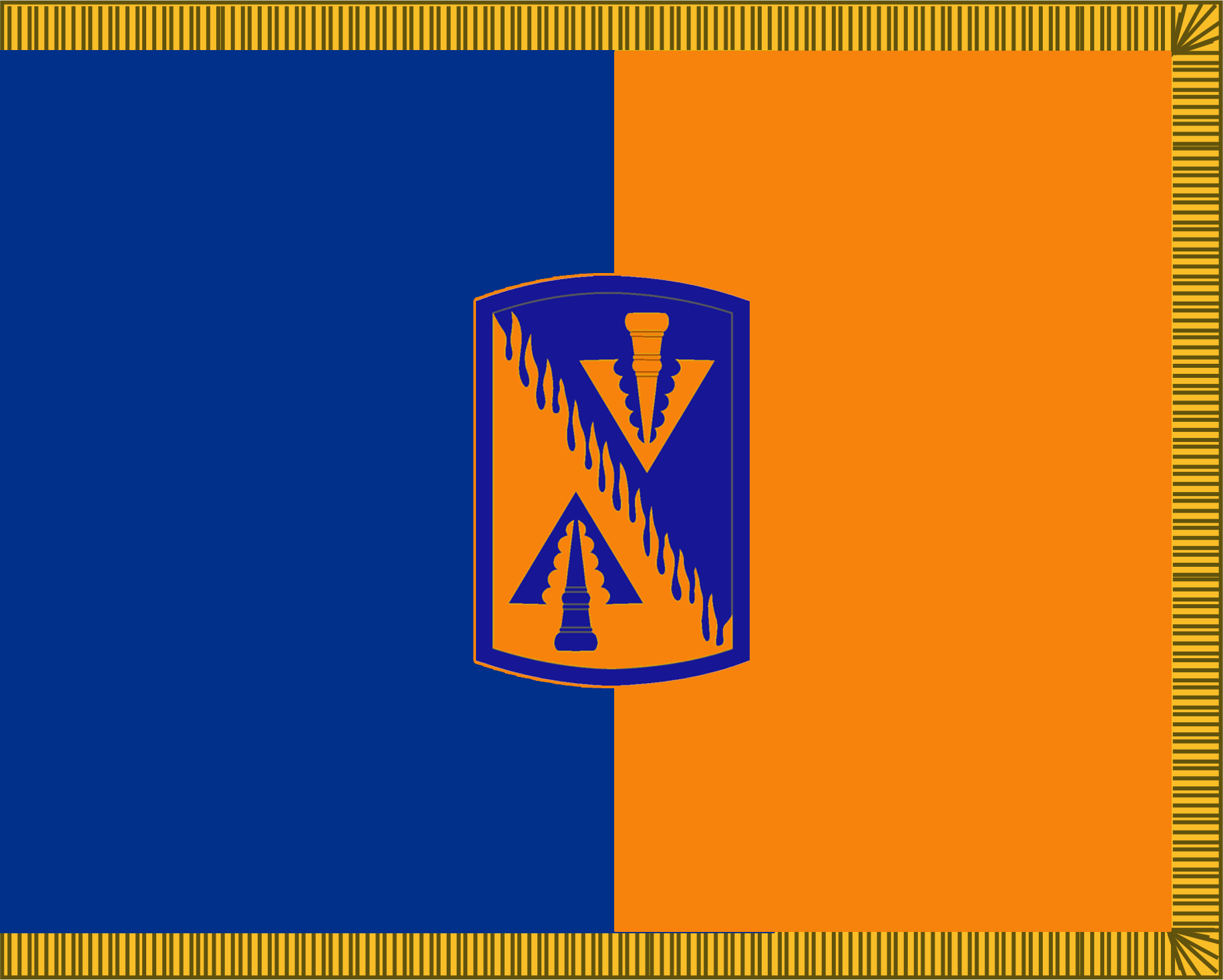
- 128th Aviation Brigade Flag

The 128th Aviation Brigade is an aviation brigade of the United States Army under the U.S. Army Aviation Center of Excellence. The brigade is located at Joint Base Langley–Eustis.

The 128th Aviation Brigade, located at Joint Base Langley–Eustis, provides Army soldiers with the training and education used to repair and maintain the Army’s combat helicopters. The education for such purposes is provided in the brigade's classrooms and simulators.

== Organization ==
The 128th Aviation Brigade consists of three battalions and a headquarters company:

- Headquarters and Headquarters Company
- 1st Battalion, 210th Aviation Regiment trains the Military Occupational Specialties 15F, Aircraft Electrician; 15H, Aircraft Pneudraulics Repairer; 15N, Avionic Mechanic; 15R, AH-64D Attack Helicopter Repairer; 15Y, AH-64D Armament/Electrical/Avionics Repairer; and the 151A, Aviation Maintenance Technician Warrant Officer Basic and Advanced Courses for the AH-64D Apache weapon system.
- 2nd Battalion, 210th Aviation Regiment trains MOSs 15B, Aircraft Powerplant Repairer; 15D, Aircraft Powertrain Repairer; 15G, Aircraft Structural Repairer; 15T, UH-60A/L/M Helicopter Repairer; and 15U, CH-47F Helicopter Repairer.
- 1st Battalion, 222nd Aviation Regiment is the student battalion, responsible for shaping student soldiers into members of the Aviation Branch through the lessons of army values, aviation safety, warrior tasks, and battle drills, in addition to a solid physical training program.

== History ==
Army aviation training began in 1942 at Fort Sill, Oklahoma, with light fixed-wing airplanes; helicopters were introduced to the inventory in the late 1940s. Aviation logistics training began at the Transportation School in 1954.

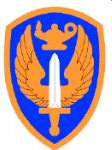
Former U.S. Army Aviation Logistics School SSI

The Army established the Aviation Branch as a basic branch on 12 April 1983. Shortly thereafter, the U.S. Army Transportation and Aviation Logistics School (USATALS) was created at Fort Eustis, Virginia.

On 1 October 1988, aviation logistics training was separated from the Transportation School, becoming the U.S. Army Aviation Logistics School (USAALS). USAALS was placed under the command and control of the U.S. Army Aviation Center and Fort Rucker. Also in 1988, USAALS became a tenant activity of Fort Eustis, Virginia.

In 2008, USAALS became the first school of the U.S. Army Training and Doctrine Command to achieve an accreditation of Training Institute of Excellence. In 2011, USAALS once again received the top rating, becoming the first training institution to receive two such ratings.

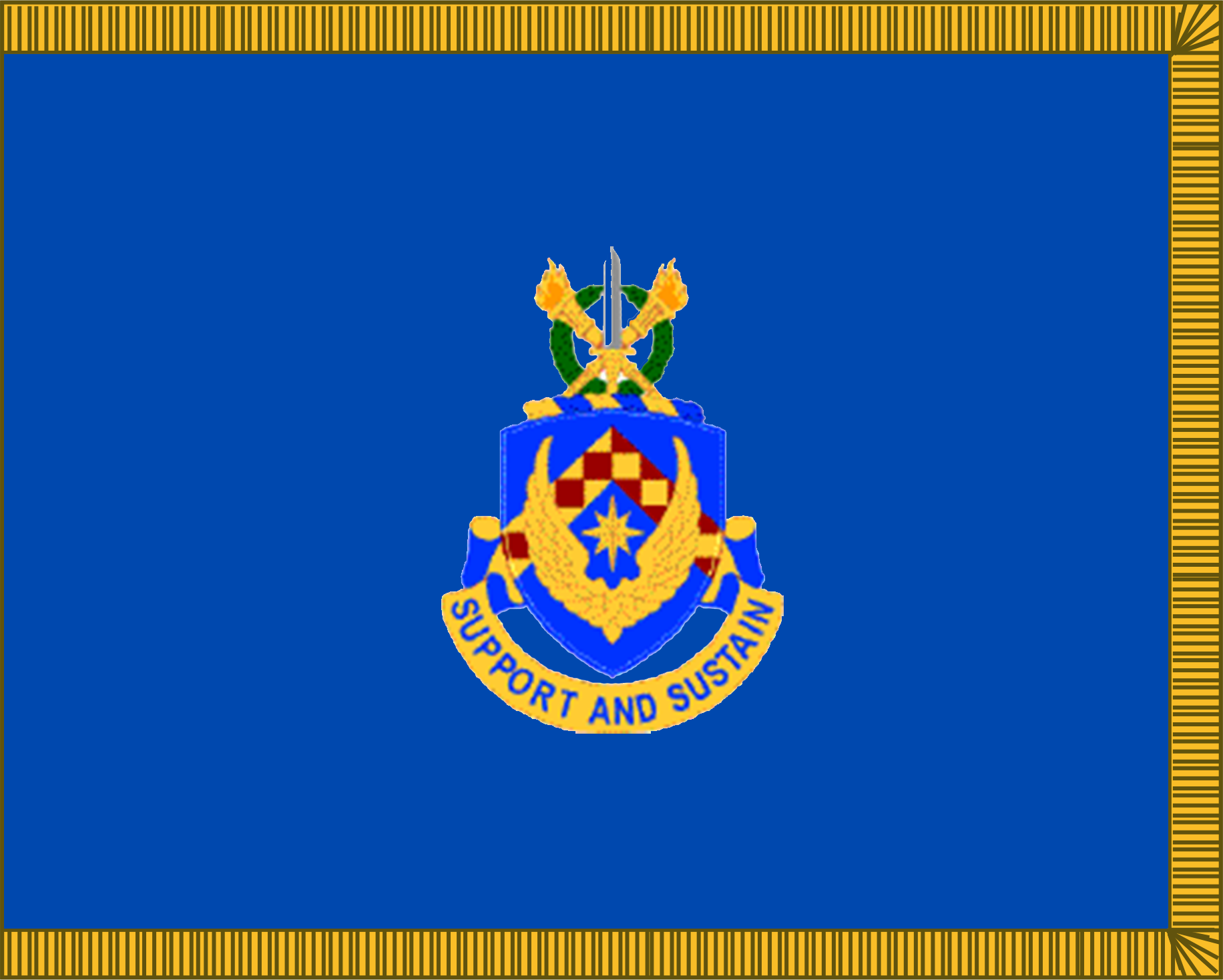
USAALS Flag

In September 2011, the decision was made to transform the USAALS into a training brigade. This change intended to enhance both its training mission and to provide brigade-level command and control over its staff and faculty, cadre, and students. In 2012, USAALS was discontinued.

On 1 February 2012, the 128th Aviation Brigade was activated. It was tasked with the centralized management of Army aviation maintenance training and oversight of the Army aviation community at Fort Eustis. The brigade had earned its motto "Born Under Fire" when it fought as a provisional unit during Operation Just Cause in December 1989. The brigade was formally activated on 16 January 1990, in Panama, and served until 1995 when it was inactivated. The brigade was awarded the Armed Forces Expedition – Panama campaign streamer.

== Lineage ==
- 1 October 1988: the U.S. Army Aviation Logistics School (USAALS) was established; it was tasked with the management of Army aviation maintenance training
- 16 January 1990: the 128th Aviation Brigade was formally activated
- 1995: the 128th Aviation Brigade was inactivated
- 2012: USAALS was discontinued
- 1 February 2012: the 128th Aviation Brigade was activated

== Decorations ==
- Armed Forces Expedition – Panama
