= 210th Aviation Regiment =

- Active: 1967-1971; 1973-1987; 1996-present
- Country: USA
- Branch: United States Army Aviation Branch
- Type: Aviation
- Part of: 128th Aviation Brigade

Insignia
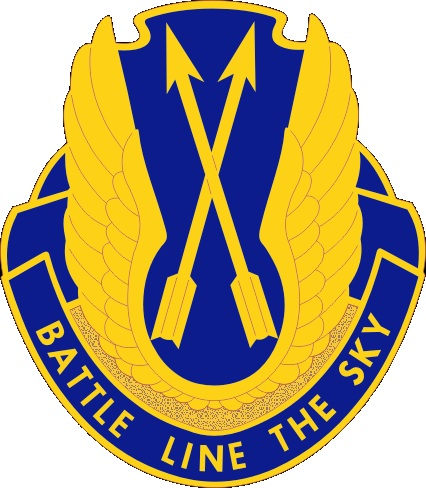
- Distinctive Unit Insignia

210th Aviation Regiment is an aviation regiment of the United States Army.

== History ==
The 210th Combat Aviation Battalion joined the 12th Aviation Group (Combat) on 15 January 1968 at Long Thanh with the following units:

- 120th Assault Helicopter Company at Long Binh
- 125th Air Traffic Control Company at Bien Hoa
- 16th Signal Company (Hyper Nav) at Tan Son Nhut
- USARV Flight Detachment at Long Thanh

=== Campaign participation credit ===
Vietnam:

- Counteroffensive, Phase II
- Counteroffensive, Phase III
- Tet Counteroffensive
- Counteroffensive, Phase IV
- Counteroffensive, Phase V
- Counteroffensive, Phase VI
- Tet 69/Counteroffensive
- Summer-Fall 1969
- Winter-Spring 1970
- Sanctuary Counteroffensive
- Counteroffensive, Phase VII
- Consolidation I

== Current configuration ==
- 1st Battalion
- 2nd Battalion
