= 222nd Aviation Regiment =

- Country: USA
- Branch: United States Army Aviation Branch
- Type: Aviation
- Part of: 128th Aviation Brigade

Insignia
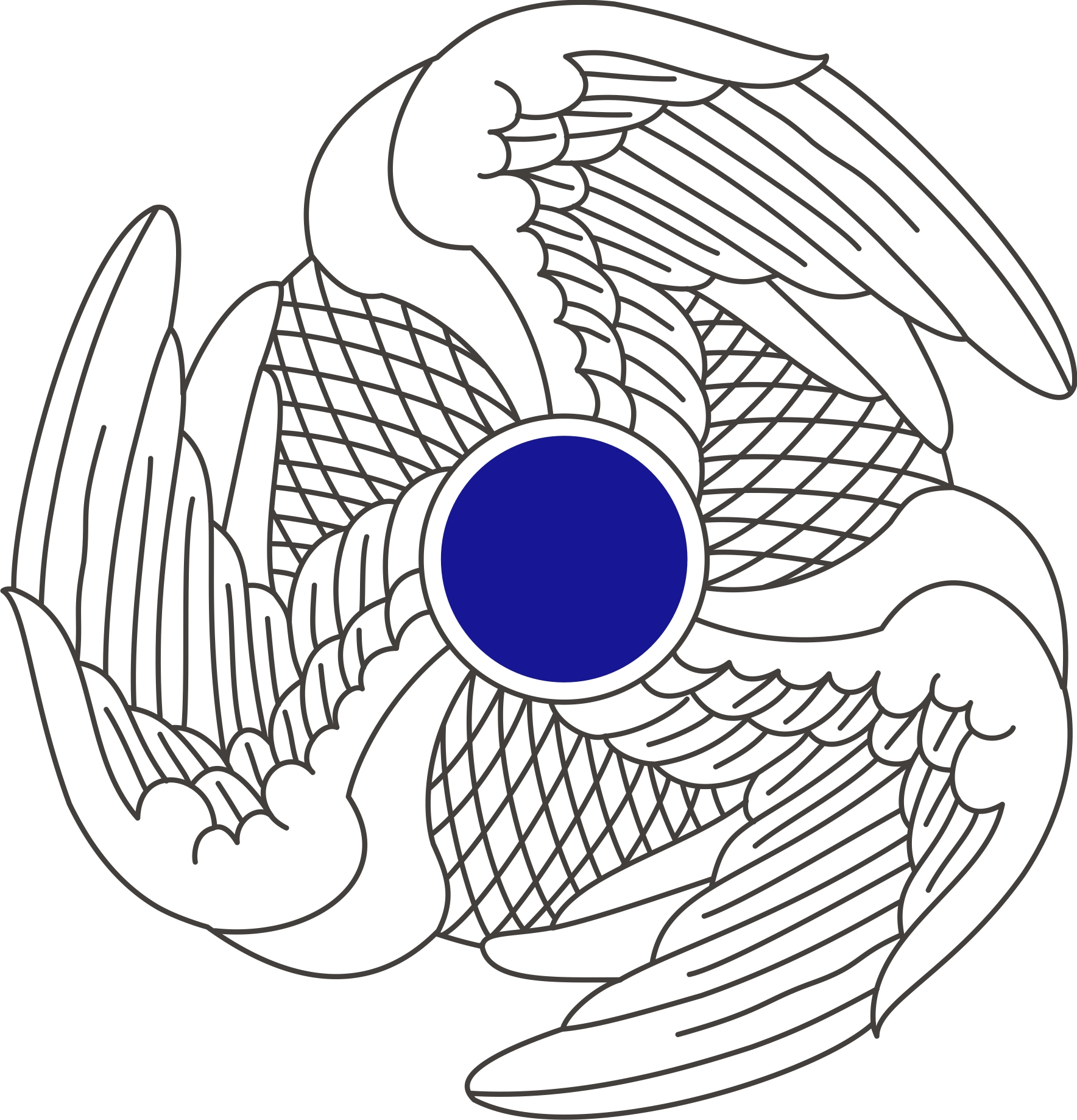
- Distinctive Unit Insignia

222nd Aviation Regiment is aviation regiment of the United States Army.

== Current configuration ==
- 1st Battalion: This is the student battalion, responsible for shaping the student Soldiers into members of the Aviation Branch through the lessons of Army Values, Aviation Safety, Warrior Tasks, and Battle Drills, in addition to a solid physical training program.
