= F-22 Raptor Demo Team =

F-22 Raptor Demonstration Team
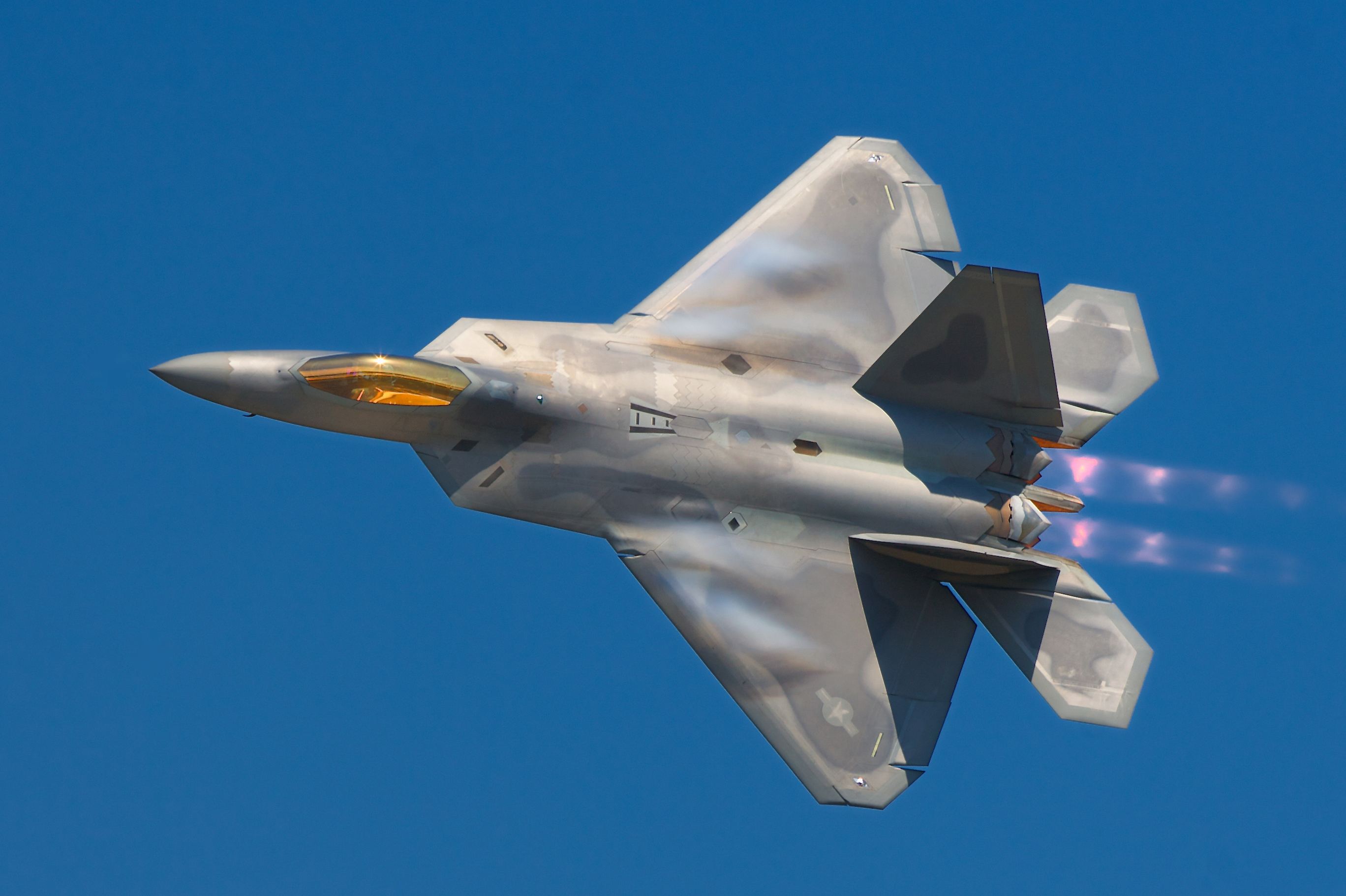
- The U.S. Air Force F-22A Raptor
- Active: 2007–present
- Country: United States
- Branch: United States Air Force
- Role: Aerobatic team
- Size: 2 officers 11 enlisted support personnel
- Part of: Air Combat Command
- Garrison/HQ: Langley Air Force Base; Hampton, Virginia
- Colors: Red, White and Blue
- Equipment: Lockheed Martin F-22 Raptor
- Website: https://www.jble.af.mil/About-Us/Units/Langley-AFB/F-22-Demo-Team/

Commanders
- Current commander: Captain Nick “Laz” Le Tourneau

The F-22 Raptor Demonstration Team is a United States Air Force flight demonstration team stationed at the home of Air Combat Command at Langley AFB in Hampton, Virginia. The team flies the USAF's Lockheed Martin F-22 Raptor at airshows around the globe, performing air maneuvers that demonstrate the supermaneuverability of the F-22. These demonstrations include the power loop, split, and tail slide, as well as a high-speed pass and dedication pass. These maneuvers are based on those designed for combat operations, but are performed at much lower altitudes than most pilots are certified to fly at. The US Air Force approved the demonstration in 2007, replacing Air Combat Command's F-15C demonstration team.

The current demo pilot and the commander of the demo team for the 2025 air show season is Capt. Nick "Laz" Le Tourneau. Nick currently lives in Hampton, VA and is married to Hannah Le Tourneau.
