= Langley Air Force Base =

United States Air Force base

- Hampton, Virginia in United States
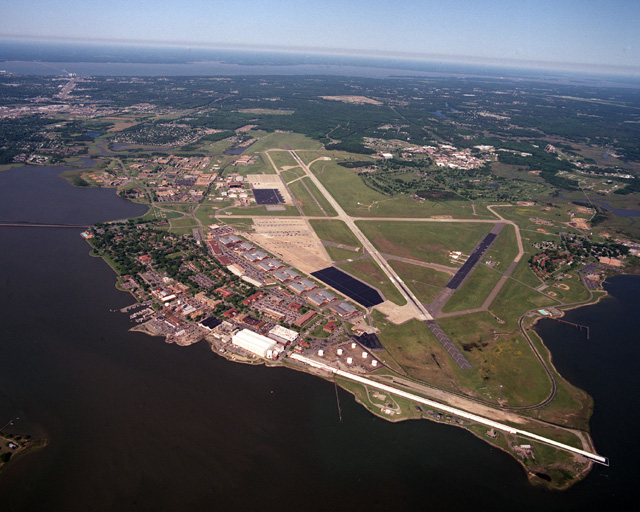
- Langley Air Force Base as seen from over Chesapeake Bay

Site information
- Type: U.S. Air Force Base
- Owner: Department of Defense
- Operator: US Air Force
- Website: www.langley.af.mil

Location
- Locations of Fort Eustis and Langley AFB within the Hampton Roads area
- Location in Virginia
- Coordinates: 37°04′58″N 076°21′38″W

Site history
- Built: 1917 (as Langley Field)
- In use: 1917 – 2010
- Fate: Merged in 2010 to become an element of Joint Base Langley–Eustis

Airfield information
- Identifiers: IATA: LFI, ICAO: KLFI, FAA LID: LFI, WMO: 745980
- Elevation: 2.4 metres (7 ft 10 in) AMSL
Runways
Direction	Length and surface
08/26	3,048.6 metres (10,002 ft) Concrete

Langley Air Force Base (IATA: LFI, ICAO: KLFI, FAA LID: LFI) is a United States Air Force base located in Hampton, Virginia, adjacent to Newport News. It was one of thirty-two Air Service training camps established after the entry of the United States into World War I in April 1917.

In October 2010, Langley Air Force Base was joined with Fort Eustis to become Joint Base Langley–Eustis. The base was established in accordance with congressional legislation implementing the recommendations of the 2005 Base Realignment and Closure Commission. The legislation ordered the consolidation of the two facilities which were nearby, but separate military installations, into a single joint base, one of 12 formed in the United States as a result of the law.

On February 4, 2023, an F-22 Raptor took off from the base and shot down a Chinese balloon, marking the jet's first-ever combat air kill.

== Overview ==
The Air Force mission at Langley is to sustain the ability for fast global deployment and air superiority for the United States or allied armed forces. The base is one of the oldest facilities of the Air Force, having been established on 30 December 1916, prior to America's entry to World War I by the Aviation Section, U.S. Signal Corps, named for aviation pioneer Samuel Pierpont Langley.

It was used during World War I as a flying field, balloon station, observers' school, photography school, experimental engineering department, and for aerial coast defense. It is situated on 3,152 acres of land between the cities of Hampton (south), NASA LaRC (west), and the northwest and southwest branches of the Back River.

"AirPower over Hampton Roads" is a recurring airshow held at Langley in the spring. Many demonstrations take place, including the F-22 Raptor Demonstration, Aerobatics, and parachute demos.

Because of the possibility of crashes of the F-22s and other aircraft stationed at the base, the City of Hampton has partnered with the Commonwealth of Virginia and United States Air Force to purchase privately owned property within the Clear Zone and Accident Potential Zones, without using eminent domain, to create a safety buffer zone around the base.

== History ==
Langley Air Force Base, originally known as Langley Field, is named after Samuel Pierpont Langley, an aerodynamic pioneer and a former Secretary of the Smithsonian Institution. In 1887, Langley began aerodynamic experiments and formed a basis for practical pioneer aviation. In 1896, he built the first steam model airplane and the first gasoline model in 1903. Both planes were believed to be capable of flight.

In 1903, he built the first man-carrying gasoline airplane, which failed to fly on its first attempt and broke apart and crashed on its second. In 1914, after major modifications, it was flown successfully by Glenn Curtiss for a little over three seconds, traveling 150 feet through the air. Langley Field was the first Air Service base built specifically for air power. It is the oldest continually active air force base in the world, and the oldest airfield in Virginia.

=== Origins ===
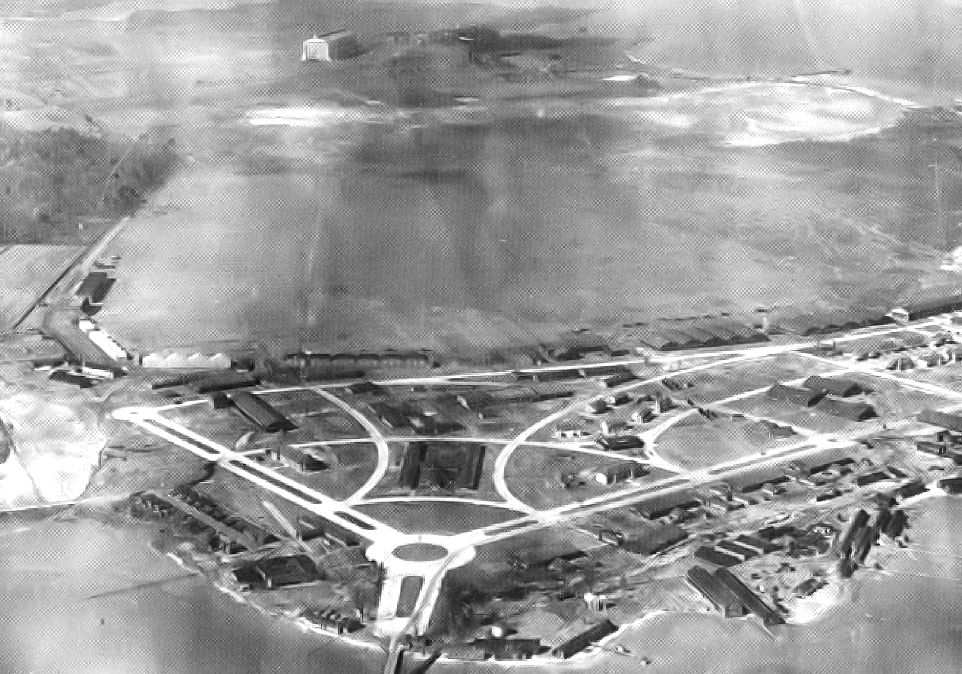
Langley Field in 1920

In 1916, the National Advisory Council for Aeronautics (NACA), predecessor to NASA, established the need for a joint airfield and proving ground for Army, Navy and NACA aircraft. NACA determined that the site must be near water for over-water flying, be flat and relatively clear for expansion and the landing and take-off of aircraft, and near an Army post. The Army appointed a board of officers who searched for a location. The officers sometimes posed as hunters and fishermen to avoid potential land speculation, which would arise if the government's interest in purchasing land was revealed. Fifteen locations were scouted, before a site near Hampton in Elizabeth City County was selected.

In 1917, the new proving ground was designated Langley Field for one of America's early air pioneers, Samuel Pierpont Langley. Langley had first made tests with his manned heavier-than-air craft, launched from a houseboat catapult, in 1903. His first attempts failed. He died in 1906, shortly before a rebuilt version of his craft soared into the sky.

Training units assigned to Langley Field:

- 5th Aviation School Squadron, June 1917

Re-designated as 119th Aero Squadron, September 1917; Detachment No. 11, Air Service, Aircraft Production, July 1918 – May 1919

- 83d Aero Squadron (II), March 1918

Re-designated as Squadron "A", July–November 1918

- 126th Aero Squadron (II) (Service), April 1918

Re-designated as Squadron "B", July–November 1918

- 127th Aero Squadron (II) (Service), April 1918

Re-designated as Squadron "C", July–November 1918

- Flying School Detachment (Consolidation of Squadrons A-C), November 1918-November 1919

Several buildings had been constructed on the field by late 1918. Aircraft on the ramp at that time included the Curtiss JN-4 "Jenny", used by Langley's School of Aerial Photography, and the de Havilland DH.4 bomber, both used during World War I. Although short-lived, hydrogen-filled dirigibles played an important role in Langley's early history and a portion of the base is still referred to as the LTA (lighter-than-air) area.

=== Inter-war years ===
In the early 1920s, Langley became the site where a new air power concept was tried and proven. Brig. Gen. Billy Mitchell led bombing runs from Langley by the 1st Provisional Air Brigade over captured German warships anchored off the coast of Virginia and North Carolina. These first successful tests set the precedent for the airplane's new role of strategic bombardment.

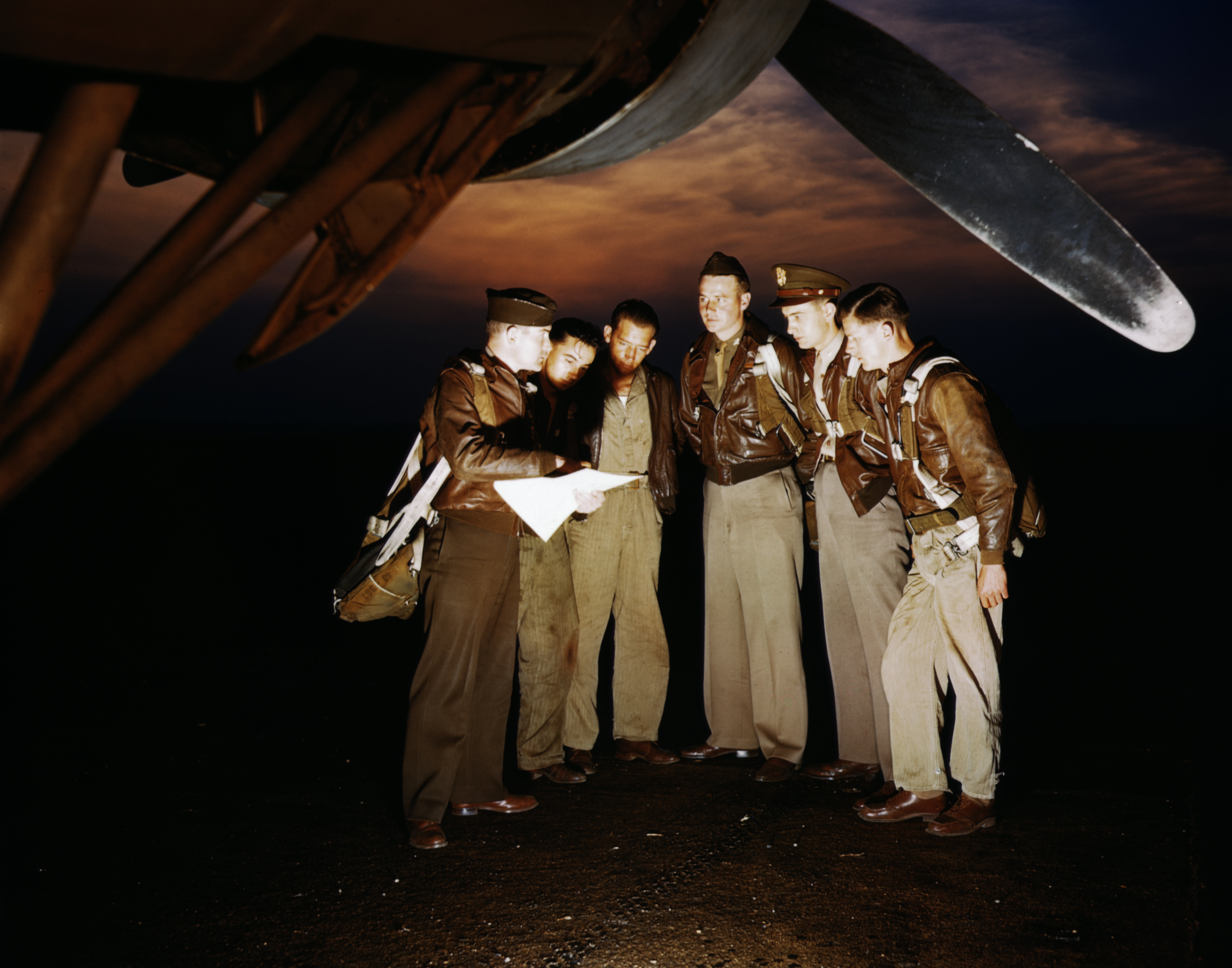
A YB-17 Flying Fortress bomber crew receiving instructions at Langley, May 1942

Throughout the 1930s Langley Field occupied a principal position in the Army's efforts to strengthen the offensive and defensive posture of its air arm. The small grassy field became a major airfield of the United States Army Air Corps. Many of the base's brick buildings of today were constructed at that time.

=== World War II ===
At the outbreak of World War II, Langley took on a new mission, to develop special detector equipment used in antisubmarine warfare. Langley units played a vital role in the sinking of enemy submarines off the United States coast during the war. The field was also used for training purposes.

=== Cold War ===
On 25 May 1946, during the beginning of the Cold War, the headquarters of the newly formed Tactical Air Command were established at Langley. The command's mission was to organize, train, equip and maintain combat-ready forces capable of rapid deployment to meet the challenges of peacetime air sovereignty and wartime air defense. The arrival of Tactical Air Command and jet aircraft marked the beginning of a new era in the history of the field, and in January 1948 Langley Field officially became Langley Air Force Base.

In January 1976, the 1st Tactical Fighter Wing was transferred to Langley from MacDill Air Force Base in Florida with the mission of maintaining combat capability for rapid global deployment to conduct air superiority operations. To accomplish this mission, the 1st TFW was the first USAF operational wing to be equipped with the F-15 Eagle.

=== Post Cold War ===
On 1 June 1992, Langley became the headquarters of the newly formed Air Combat Command, as Tactical Air Command was inactivated as part of the Air Force's restructuring.

On 15 December 2005, the 1st Fighter Wing's 27th Fighter Squadron became the Air Force's first operational F-22 fighter squadron. The wing's complement of 40 F-22s, in the 27th and 94th FS reached Full Operational Capability on 12 December 2007.

Langley Air Force Base was severely damaged by flooding due to the storm surge from Hurricane Isabel in September 2003 and again during the November 2009 Mid-Atlantic nor'easter. Hurricane Isabel damages to Langley Air Force Base were approximately $147 million. The damages associated with the 2009 nor'easter were approximately $43 million. Resilience measures taken since 2003 include raising low-lying critical infrastructure, mandating a minimum elevation for new construction, construction of a 6 mile long sea wall and a groundwater pumping station. The site of Langley Air Force base, with an average elevation of 3 feet, has seen 14 inches of sea level rise since 1930.

=== Reorganisation ===
On 1 October 2010, Langley Air Force Base was joined with Fort Eustis to become Joint Base Langley–Eustis.

== Major units ==
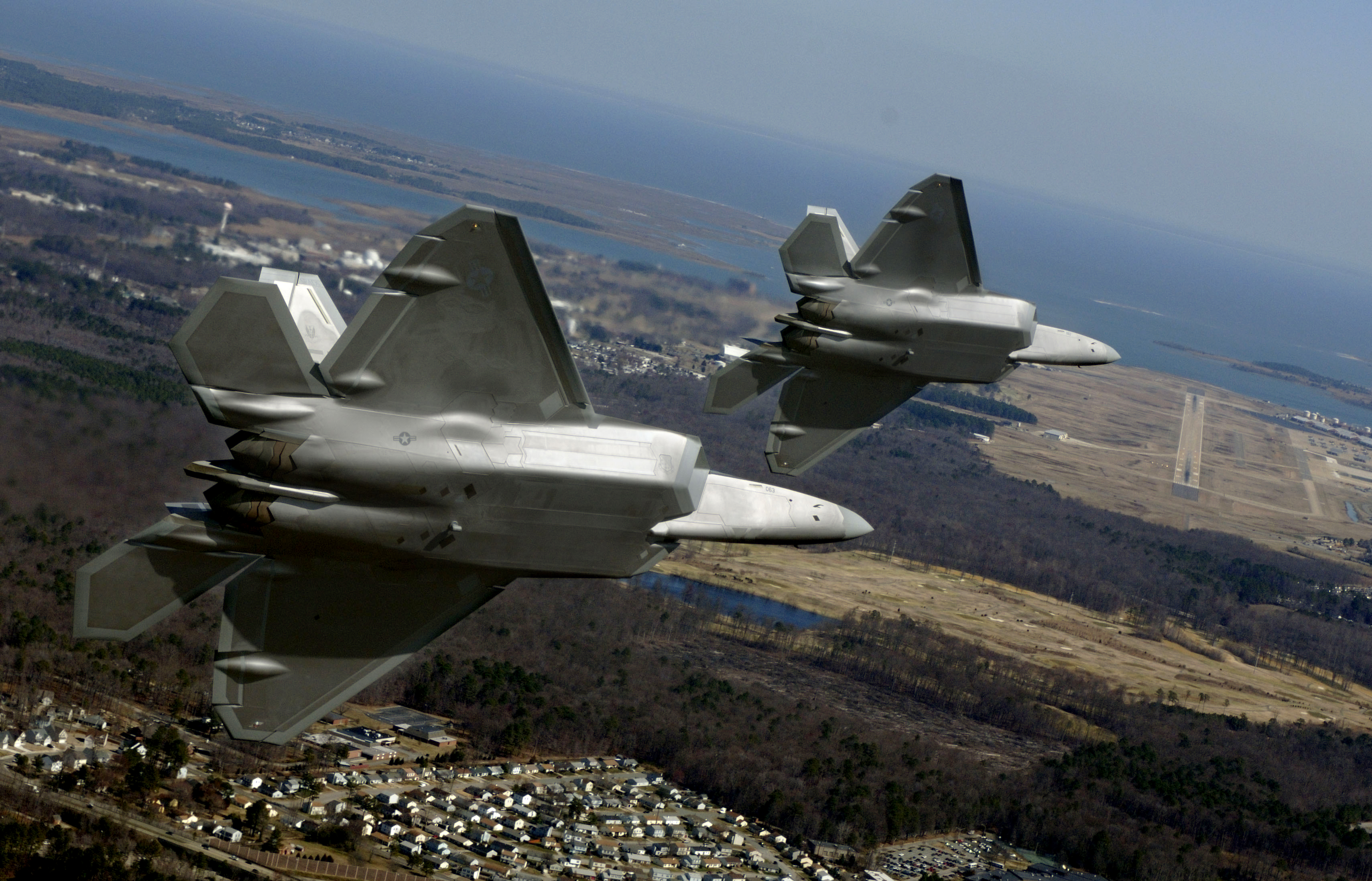
94th Fighter Squadron F-22As approaching Langley Air Force Base

To accomplish their mission, the support unit men and women of the 633d Air Base Wing at Langley are housed in the Mission Support Groups and Medical Group and support several tenant units:

- The 1st Fighter Wing is composed of the 1st Operations Group and the 1st Maintenance Group, which work together to maintain Joint Base Langley–Eustis's F-22 Raptors.

Operational squadrons of the 1st Operations Group are: (Tail Code: FF)

27th Fighter Squadron (F-22 Raptor)
94th Fighter Squadron (F-22 Raptor)
7th Fighter Training Squadron (T-38A Talon)

- 480th Intelligence, Surveillance and Reconnaissance Wing

The 480th ISR Wing operates and maintains the Air Force Distributed Common Ground System, or DCGS, also known as the "Sentinel" weapon system, conducting imagery, cryptologic, and measurement and signatures intelligence activities.

The Wing is composed of the following units worldwide:

480th ISR Group, Fort Gordon, Ga.
497th ISR Group, Joint Base Langley–Eustis, Va.
548th ISR Group, Beale Air Force Base, Calif.
692d ISR Group, Joint Base Pearl Harbor–Hickam, Hawaii
693d ISR Group, Ramstein Air Base, Germany
694th ISR Group, Osan Air Base, South Korea

- 192d Fighter Wing (Virginia Air National Guard)

The 192d Fighter Wing mission is to fly and maintain the F-22 Raptor at Joint Base Langley–Eustis through the 149th Fighter Squadron, and support the ongoing intelligence mission through the 192d Intelligence Squadron.

- 633d Air Base Wing

The 633rd ABW is an Air Force-led mission support wing, serving both Air Force and Army units, as a result of a congressionally mandated joint-basing initiative between Langley and Eustis.

Langley also hosts the Air Force Command and Control Integration Center field operating agency and Headquarters Air Combat Command (ACC).

Langley is also home to the F-22 Raptor Demo Team. This team, who travel all over the world performing different maneuvers used in air combat, is used to help recruit for the United States Air Force. Performing at airshows and other special events, the squadron is the only demonstration team to use the F-22 Raptor.

=== Major commands to which assigned ===
- Aviation Section, U.S. Signal Corps, Jun 1917
- Army Air Service, 24 May 1918

Re-designated: Army Air Corps, 2 Jul 1926

- General Headquarters Air Force, 1 Mar 1935
- Northeastern Air District, 19 Oct 1940

Re-designated 1st Air Force, 9 Apr 1941; First Air Force, 18 Sep 1942

- Army Air Forces Training Command, 15 Sep 1944
- Army Airways Communications Service, 1 Dec 1945
- Air Transport Command, 13 Mar 1946
- Tactical Air Command 1 May 1946
- Continental Air Command, 1 Dec 1948
- Tactical Air Command, 1 Dec 1950
- Air Combat Command, 1 June 1992 – Present

=== Major historical units ===
Pre World War II

Aviation Section, U.S. Signal Corps

- HQ Langley Fld, inception - June 1917
- 119th Aero Squadron, 2 July 1917

Air Service (1920–1926); United States Army Air Corps (1926–1941)

- 2nd Bombardment Group, 1 July 1922 - 29 October 1942
- Air Corps Technical School (Unknown Element) 26 May 1919 - 30 September 1921
- Air Corps Tactical School - 1 November 1920 - 15 July 1931
- Air Park Company #3, 1 October 1921
- 58th Service Squadron, January 1923

General Headquarters (GHQ), Air Force

- Station Complement Langley Fld, 1 March 1935
- Base HQ and 1st Air Base Squadron, 1 September 1936
- First Air Base Gp (Reinf) 1 September 1940

World War II

First Air Force

- First Air Base Gp, 25 November 1941
- First Service Gp, 13 June 1942
- 111th AAF Base Unit, 10 April 1944

Army Air Forces Training Command

- 3539th AAF Base Unit, 10 September 1944
- 76th AAF Base Unit, 1 December 1945

Air Transport Command

- 304th AAF Base Unit, 30 April 1946

AAF Antisubmarine Command

- 1st Search Attack Group, 17 June 1942 – 10 April 1944
- 13th Bombardment Group, 15 January-6 June 1941
- 304th Bombardment Group, 29 October-30 December 1942
- 378th Bombardment Group, 13 October-14 December 1942

United States Air Force

Tactical Air Command

- 363d Tactical Reconnaissance Wing, 15 August 1947

160th Tactical Reconnaissance Squadron (RF-80)
161st Tactical Reconnaissance Squadron (RF-80)
12th Tactical Reconnaissance Squadron (RB-26)

Continental Air Command

- 4th Fighter Wing, 26 April 1949 (F-80, F-86)

Tactical Air Command

- 363d Tactical Reconnaissance Wing, 1 September 1950

12th Tactical Reconnaissance Squadron (RB-26)

- 47th Bombardment Wing, 12 March 1951 (B-26, B-45)
- 4430th Air Base Wing, 12 February 1952
- 405th Fighter-Bomber Wing, 1 May 1953 (B-26, B/RB-57, F-100)
- 4505th Air Refueling Wing, 15 January 1958 (KB-29, KB-50)
- 463d Troop Carrier Wing, 1 July 1963 (C-130)
- 316th Tactical Airlift Wing, 1 January 1966 (C-130)
- 48th Fighter-Interceptor Squadron, 1953–1991

Military Airlift Command

- 316th Tactical Airlift Wing 1975 (C-130)

Tactical Air Command, and later Air Combat Command

- 1st Fighter Wing, 15 April 1977 - Current (F-15A/B/C/D, F-22A)
- 633d Air Base Wing, 7 January 2010 - Current (Installation support)

== See also ==
- Virginia World War II Army Airfields
- List of Training Section Air Service airfields
