= List of United States Army aircraft battalions =

This is a list of United States Army aircraft battalions. The aviation battalions in the US Army are generally attached to divisions, corps, and armies and mostly consist of helicopters, both attack and reconnaissance. The helicopter battalions are often grouped into aviation brigades. There are also a few fixed-wing aircraft battalions, consisting of training aircraft, Beechcraft RC-12 Guardrail operational aircraft, and Beechcraft C-12 Huron / Cessna UC-35 transports for VIP personnel. Some are Air National Guard units.

Separate aviation companies fought in the Vietnam War; aviation battalions fought in Vietnam. The Aviation Branch was established in 1984. Since that date aviation battalions have fought in the Gulf War of 1991; served in peace support operations in Bosnia and Kosovo; fought in the War in Afghanistan (2001-2021); and in the Iraq War (US phase 2003–2011) and against ISIL in Operation Inherent Resolve, as well as helping garrison the Korean Cease-Fire Line.

== Cavalry Regiments ==
Cavalry units	Squadron	CAB	Division	Location	Notes
6th Cavalry	1st Heavy Attack Reconnaissance Squadron	1st Combat Aviation Brigade	1st Infantry Division	Marshall Army Airfield, Fort Riley, Kansas	"The Fighting Sixth"
	2nd Squadron	25th Combat Aviation Brigade	25th Infantry Division	Wheeler Army Airfield, Hawaii	"Lightning Horse"
	3d Squadron (Heavy Attack Reconnaissance)	1st Armored Combat Aviation Brigade	1st Armored Division	Biggs Army Airfield, Fort Bliss, Texas	
	4th Heavy Attack Reconnaissance Squadron	16th Combat Aviation Brigade	N/A	Gray Army Airfield, Joint Base Lewis–McChord, Washington	"Seek and Destroy"
	6th Squadron	10th Combat Aviation Brigade	10th Mountain Division	Wheeler-Sack Army Airfield, Fort Drum, New York	"Six Shooters"
17th Cavalry	1st Heavy Attack Reconnaissance Squadron	82nd Combat Aviation Brigade	82nd Airborne Division	Simmons Army Airfield, Fort Bragg, North Carolina	
	2nd Squadron	101st Combat Aviation Brigade	101st Airborne Division (Air Assault)	Campbell Army Airfield, Fort Campbell, Kentucky	"Out Front"
	3rd Squadron	3rd Combat Aviation Brigade	3rd Infantry Division	Hunter Army Airfield, Fort Stewart, Georgia	"Marne Air"
	5th Squadron	2nd Combat Aviation Brigade	2nd Infantry Division	Desiderio Army Airfield, Camp Humphreys, Republic of Korea	"Talon"
	6th Squadron	4th Combat Aviation Brigade	4th Infantry Division	Butts Army Air Field, Fort Carson, Colorado	
	7th Squadron	1st Air Cavalry Brigade	1st Cavalry Division	Yoakum–DeFrenn Army Heliport, Fort Cavazos, Texas	"PaleHorse"

== Aviation Regiments ==
- CAB = Combat Aviation Brigade

=== 001-100 ===
Regiment	Units	Base	Notes
1st Aviation	1st Battalion (Attack Reconnaissance) 2nd Battalion (General Support) 3rd Battalion (Assault Helicopter)	Fort Riley, Kansas	Established as regiment 16 November 1987.
2nd Aviation	2nd Battalion (Assault Helicopter) 3rd Battalion (General Support) 4th Battalion (Attack Reconnaissance)	K-16 Air Base, South Korea Camp Humphreys, South Korea Camp Humphreys, South Korea	CAB, 2nd Infantry Division
3rd Aviation	1st Battalion (Attack Reconnaissance) 2nd Battalion (General Support) 4th Battalion (Assault Helicopter)	Hunter Army Airfield Savannah, Georgia	CAB, 3rd Infantry Division
4th Aviation	2nd Battalion (General Support) 3rd Battalion (Assault Helicopter) 4th Battalion (Attack Reconnaissance)	Fort Carson, Colorado	CAB, 4th Infantry Division
5th Aviation	1st Battalion	Joint Readiness Training Center, Fort Polk, Louisiana	UH-72A, UH-60
10th Aviation	1st Battalion (Attack Reconnaissance) 2nd Battalion (Assault Helicopter) 3rd Battalion (General Support)	Fort Drum, New York	CAB, 10th Mountain Division
11th Aviation (Training)	1st Battalion, Air Traffic Services Command	Fort Rucker, Alabama	
13th Aviation (Training)	1st Battalion, 1st Aviation Brigade	Fort Rucker, Alabama	
14th Aviation (Training)	1st Battalion, 110th Aviation Brigade	Fort Rucker, Alabama	
25th Aviation	1st Battalion (Attack Reconnaissance) 2nd Battalion (Assault Helicopter) 3rd Battalion (General Support)	Wheeler Field, Hawaii	CAB, 25th Infantry Division. Established as regiment May 1988.
52nd Aviation	1st Battalion (General Support) 6th Battalion		
82nd Aviation	1st Battalion (Attack Reconnaissance) 2nd Battalion (Assault Helicopter) 3rd Battalion (General Support)	Fort Bragg, North Carolina	CAB, 82nd Airborne Division. Established as USARS regiment January 1987.

=== 100-200 ===
Regiment	Units	Base	Notes
101st Aviation	1st Battalion (Attack) 5th Battalion (Assault) 6th Battalion (General Support)	Fort Campbell, Ky.	Established as regiment 1987.
104th Aviation	1st Battalion 2nd Battalion (General Support)		PA ARNG (Attack) PA, WV ARNG (GSAB)
106th Aviation	1st Battalion	Peoria, IL	Created as regiment in 1987.
107th Aviation	1st Battalion (Airfield Operations)		Established as regiment 1996.
108th Aviation	1st Battalion (Assault Helicopter)		Established as regiment 1987.
111th Aviation	1st Battalion (General Support) 2nd Battalion (Airfield Operations)		FL ARNG
114th Aviation	1st Battalion		
123rd Aviation	1st Battalion, West Coast, c.1987 4th Battalion		
124th Aviation Regiment	1st Battalion	Lucius D. Clay Kaserne	UH60M C-12U; UC-35A1
126th Aviation	1st Battalion (General Support) 3rd Battalion (General Support)		
130th Aviation	1st Battalion (Attack Reconnaissance) 2nd Battalion (Airfield Operations)		
131st Aviation	1st Battalion (Assault Helicopter)		EStablished as regiment 1987.
135th Aviation	1st Battalion (Attack Helicopter) 2nd Battalion (General Support)	Buckley Space Force Base	CO ARNG
137th Aviation	1st Battalion (General Support)		Established as regiment 1987.
140th Aviation	1st Battalion 3rd Battalion (Security & Support)		
142nd Aviation	1st Battalion 3rd Battalion (Assault Helicopter)		
145th Aviation	1st Battalion		
147th Aviation	1st Battalion 2nd Battalion (Assault Helicopter)		
149th Aviation	1st Battalion 2nd Battalion (General Support)		
150th Aviation	1st Battalion (Assault Helicopter)		
151st Aviation	1st Battalion (Attack Reconnaissance) 2nd Battalion (Security & Support)		
155th Aviation	5th Battalion		
158th Aviation	1st Battalion (Assault Helicopter) 3rd Battalion 7th Battalion (General Support)		
159th Aviation	1st Battalion 2nd Battalion (Attack) 5th Battalion (General Support)		
160th Special Operations Aviation	1st Battalion 2nd Battalion 3rd Battalion 4th Battalion		
168th Aviation	1st Battalion (General Support)		Washington ARNG
169th Aviation	1st Battalion (General Support)		
171st Aviation	1st Battalion (General Support)		
183rd Aviation	1st Battalion (Attack Reconnaissance)		
185th Aviation	1st Battalion (Assault Helicopter)		
189th Aviation	1st Battalion (General Support)		

=== 200-300 ===
Regiment	Units	Base	Notes
210th Aviation			
212th Aviation			
211th Aviation	1st Battalion (Attack Reconnaissance) 2nd Battalion (General Support)		
214th Aviation	1st Battalion (General Support) 3d Battalion		Company B = King Air
222nd Aviation	1st Battalion		
223rd Aviation			
224th Aviation	1st Battalion (Security & Support) 2nd Battalion (Assault Helicopter)		
227th Aviation	1st Battalion (Attack Reconnaissance) 2nd Battalion (General Support) 3rd Battalion		
228th Aviation	1st Battalion 2nd Battalion		
229th Aviation	1st Battalion (Attack Reconnaissance) 8th Battalion		
238th Aviation	2nd Battalion (General Support) 3rd Battalion (General Support)		
245th Aviation	1st Battalion (Airfield Operations) 2nd Battalion		
285th Aviation	1st Battalion (Attack Reconnaissance) 2nd Battalion (Assault Helicopter)		

=== 300- ===
Regiment	Units	CAB	Division	Base	Notes
376th Aviation	1st Battalion (Security & Support)				
501st Aviation	1st Battalion (Attack Reconnaissance) 2d Battalion (General Support) 3d Battalion (Assault Helicopter)	1st Armored Combat Aviation Brigade	1st Armored Division	Biggs Army Airfield, Fort Bliss, Texas	
641st Aviation	2nd Battalion				

4th Battalion, 501st Aviation Regiment, was previously active, including in 2016.4th Battalion

== Aviation Battalions ==
Battalion	Units	Base	Years active	Notes
1st Aviation Battalion	A Company: Champagne Flight (UH-1D)	Fort Riley; Vietnam	1965-70	(Divisional)
4th Aviation Battalion		Fort Lewis; Vietnam	1966-70	(Divisional)
9th Aviation Battalion	A Company (UH-1D/H) (1968); B Company (UH-1D/H, AH-1G & OH-6A) (1968)	Fort Riley; Vietnam	1967-69	(Divisional)
10th Aviation Battalion	48th Aviation Company (1968); 92nd Aviation Company (1968); 192nd Aviation Company (1968); 155th Aviation Company (1968); 243rd Aviation Company (1968); 281st Aviation Company (1968)	Fort Benning; Vietnam	1965-72	(Combat) (1968)
11th Aviation Battalion	128th Aviation Company (1968); 162nd Aviation Company (1968); 173rd Aviation Company (1968); 213th Aviation Company (1968); 163rd Aviation Company (1971)	Fort Benning; Phu Loi		(Combat) (1968)
12th Aviation Battalion		Military District of Washington	1966 onwards	
13th Aviation Battalion	114th Aviation Company (1964)(1968); 121st Aviation Company (1964)(1968); Company A, 502nd Aviation Battalion (1964); 175th Aviation Company (1968); 336th Aviation Company (1968); 271st Aviation Company (1968)	Can Tho; Soc Trang; Binh Thuy Air Base	1964-72	(Combat) (1968)
14th Aviation Battalion	71st Aviation Company (1968); 174th Aviation Company (1968); 176th Aviation Company (1968); 178th Aviation Company (1968); 132nd Aviation Company (1968)	Fort Benning; Nha Trang; Qui Nhon; Chu Lai	1964-71	(Combat) (1968)
25th Aviation Battalion	A Company (UH-1D)	Schofield Barracks	1966-70	(Divisional)
47th Aviation Battalion		Minnesota ARNG	1963-1986(?)	47th Infantry Division
52nd Aviation Battalion	117th Aviation Company (1964); 119th Aviation Company (1964); 57th Aviation Company (1968); 119th Aviation Company (1968); 170th Aviation Company (1968); 179th Aviation Company (1968); 189th Aviation Company (1968); 355th Aviation Company (1968); 361st Aviation Company (1968)	Pleiku Air Base	1969-72	(Combat) (1968)
58th Aviation Battalion		Long Binh; Tan Son Nhut	1968-69	(Airfield Operations Command)
101st Aviation Battalion	A Company (UH-1D)	Fort Campbell	1967-72	(Divisional)
123rd Aviation Battalion		Chu Lai	1967-71	(Divisional)
145th Aviation Battalion	68th Aviation Company (1964)(1968); 118th Aviation Company (1964)(1968); 120th Aviation Company (1964); Company A, 501st Aviation Battalion (1964); 190th Aviation Company (1968); 334th Aviation Company (1968); 135th Aviation Company (1968)	Tan Son Nhut Air Base; Bien Hoa; Long Binh	1963-72	(Combat) (1968)
158th Aviation Battalion		Fort Carson; Vietnam	1969-71	(Assault Helicopter)
159th Aviation Battalion		Vietnam	1968-72	(Assault Helicopter)
210th Aviation Battalion	25th Aviation Company (1968); 54th Aviation Company (1968); 73rd Aviation Company (1968); 74th Aviation Company (1968); 120th Aviation Company (1968); 184th Aviation Company (1968)	Fort Bragg; Tan Son Nhut; Long Thanh	1967-71	(Combat) (1968)
212th Aviation Battalion	21st Aviation Company (1968); 131st Aviation Company (1968); 220th Aviation Company (1968); 245th Aviation Company (1968); 282nd Aviation Company (1968)	Fort Campbell; Da Nang	1967-71	(Combat) (1968)
214th Aviation Battalion	191st Aviation Company (1968); 240th Aviation Company (1968); 117th Aviation Company (1968); 195th Aviation Company (1968)			(Combat) (1968)
222nd Aviation Battalion	147th Aviation Company (1968); 273rd Aviation Company (1968); 205th Aviation Company (1968)			(Combat Support) (1968)
223rd Aviation Battalion	18th Aviation Company (1968); 183rd Aviation Company (1968); 185th Aviation Company (1968); 203rd Aviation Company (1968); 219th Aviation Company (1968); 225th Aviation Company (1968)	Qui Nhon; Dong Ha	1966-72	(Combat Support) (1968)
227th Aviation Battalion	A Company (UH-1D/H) (1964); B Company (UH-1D/H) (1964); C Company (UH-1D/H) (1964); D Company (UH-1B/AH-1G) (1964)	Fort Benning; Phuoc Vinh	1965-71	(Assault Helicopter) (1964).
228th Aviation Battalion	A Company (CH-47A & OH-13/OH-6A) (1965); B Company (CH-47A & OH-13/OH-6A) (1965); C Company (CH-47A & OH-13/OH-6A) (1965)	Fort Benning; Camp Radcliff; Da Nang	1965-71	(Assault Support Helicopter) (1965).
229th Aviation Battalion	A Company (UH-1D/H) (1964); B Company (UH-1D/H) (1964); C Company (UH-1D/H) (1964); D Company (UH-1B/AH-1G) (1964)	Fort Benning	1965-72	(Assault Helicopter) (1964).
268th Aviation Battalion	61st Aviation Company (1968); 129th Aviation Company (1968); 134th Aviation Company (1968); 180th Aviation Company (1968); 335th Aviation Company (1968); 196th Aviation Company (1968)	Fort Hood; Phu Hiep; Tuy Hoa	1967-72	(Combat) (1968)
269th Aviation Battalion	116th Aviation Company (1968); 187th Aviation Company (1968); 242nd Aviation Company (1968)	Fort Bragg; Cu Chi	1967-71	(Combat) (1968)
307th Aviation Battalion	199th Aviation Company (1968); 221st Aviation Company (1968); 235th Aviation Company (1968); 244th Aviation Company (1968)	Can Tho	1967-71	(Combat) (1968)
308th Aviation Battalion		Bien Hoa; Phu Bai	1967-68	(Combat)
501st Aviation Battalion	A Company (UH-1B)	Bien Hoa	1965-	
502nd Aviation Battalion				
2916th Aviation Battalion	Alpha Aviation Company; Bravo Aviation Company; Charlie Medical Aviation Company; Bravo-229 Aviation Company	Fort Irwin		
I Corps Aviation Battalion		Vietnam	1966	
Capital Aviation Battalion		Saigon	1966-67	(Provisional)
Delta Aviation Battalion		Vietnam	1963-64	(Provisional)

Also 19th Aviation Battalion in United States Army Alaska after 1964.

== See also ==
- List of aviation companies of the United States Army
