= 17th Aviation Brigade =

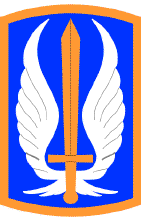
- 17th Aviation Brigade shoulder sleeve insignia
- Active: 1965–2005
- Country: United States
- Allegiance: United States Army
- Type: Aviation brigade
- Role: Aviation
- Size: Brigade
- Nickname: Freedom's Eagles
- Colors: Blue and Orange

Commanders
- Notable commanders: LTG John Riggs

Insignia
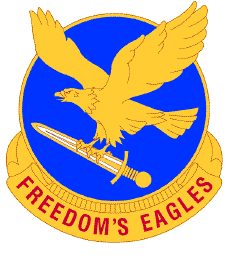
- Distinctive unit insignia

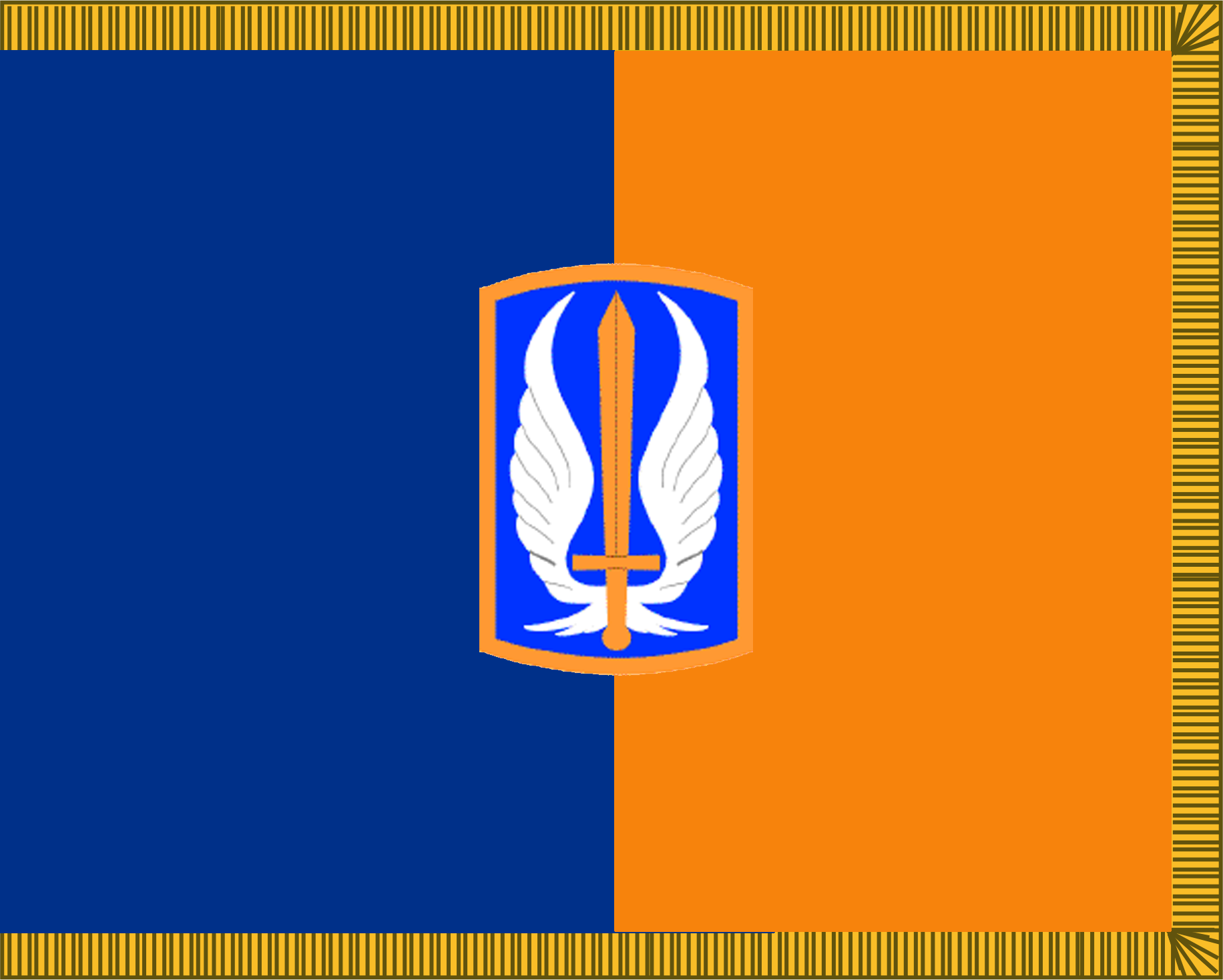
- 17th Aviation Brigade Flag

The 17th Aviation Brigade was a military formation of the United States Army. It was originally activated at Nha Trang, Vietnam, as the 17th Aviation Group (Combat) on 15 December 1965 under the 1st Aviation Brigade. Later it moved to Tuy Hoa in November 1970 and then to Pleiku in January 1972. The group had the mission of commanding and controlling all non-divisional assets in II Corps Tactical Zone, under I Field Force. The 10th, 14th, 52d, 223rd and 268th Aviation Battalions as well as the 7th Squadron, 17th Cavalry served with the group.

== Units ==
The following companies and detachments were also under the 17th Aviation Group:

- I Corps (Provisional), December 1965 – July 1966; expanded into the I Corps Aviation Battalion (Provisional)
- 57th Aviation Company (Assault Helicopter), April 1972 – March 1973; departed Vietnam
- 58th Aviation Detachment, October 1968 – January 1972; departed Vietnam
- 60th Aviation Company (Assault Helicopter), January 1972 – March 1973; departed Vietnam
- 129th Aviation Company (Assault Helicopter), April 1972 – March 1973; departed Vietnam
- 180th Aviation Company (Assault Support Helicopter), January 1972 – February 1972; transferred to the 7th Squadron, 17th Cavalry; second tour: April 1972 – February 1973; departed Vietnam
- 220th Aviation Company (Surveillance Light Aircraft), December 1965 – August 1966; transferred to I Corps Aviation Battalion (Provisional)
- 361st Aviation Company (Aerial Weapons), April 1972 – August 1972; departed Vietnam
- Troop H, 10th Cavalry (Air), April 1972 – February 1973; departed Vietnam. Utilized assets of Troop C, 7th Squadron, 17th Cavalry
- Troop H, 17th Cavalry (Air), April 1972 – February 1973; departed Vietnam. Utilized assets of Troop B, 7th Squadron, 17th Cavalry
- Troop K, 17th Cavalry (Air), October 1970 – December 1970; departed Vietnam. Utilized assets of Troop D, 7th Squadron, 17th Cavalry

== 119th Aviation Company ==
During the Vietnam War, one of the units that became part of the 52d Aviation Battalion (Combat), 17th Aviation Group (Combat) was the 119th Aviation Company (Assault Helicopter). The company operated throughout the Central Highlands of Vietnam during the war, from arrival in September 1962 until inactivation in November 1970. Originally designated the 81st Transportation Company and equipped with twin-rotor Piasecki CH-21 "Flying Banana" piston-engined helicopters, the company arrived in Pleiku, Vietnam, on 17 September 1962. On 25 June 1963 its assets were used to form the 119th Aviation Company (Assault Helicopter)(Airmobile), and it was re-equipped with turbine-powered single-rotor Bell UH-1A and UH1-B Hueys. The company's area of operations included the entire Central Highlands of Vietnam, plus large portions of Laos and Cambodia.

Eventually assigned to the 52d Aviation Battalion (Combat), 17th Aviation Group (Combat), 1st Aviation Brigade and headquartered at Camp Holloway in Pleiku, the 119th was also based at An Khe (Camp Radcliff) for a short time later in the war. The helicopters were equipped with 16 to 20 lightly armed UH-1Ds (or UH-1H model "Slick" troopships that used the radio callsign called "Alligator" or "Gator"), and approximately 8 Huey UH-1C model gunships known as "Crocodiles" or "Crocs." The company at one time also used the callsign called "Black Dragon" from which the 52d's "Flying Dragon" callsign evolved. The total company strength of approximately 225 included 50 to 60 pilots and an equal number of crewmembers, plus field maintenance and other critical support personnel.

During over eight years in Vietnam, the 119th Aviation Company (Assault Helicopter) provided helicopter support for the US Army 4th Infantry Division, 25th Infantry Division, 1st Cavalry Division, 173d Airborne Brigade, US Marine Corps, United States Army Special Forces and the Army of the Republic of Vietnam. They also flew many classified missions for MACV-SOG. Over 60 members of the 119th Aviation Company (Assault Helicopter) were killed in action, with many more wounded.

As the war in Vietnam wound down, the 17th Aviation Group was inactivated in Oakland, California, on 16 March 1973.

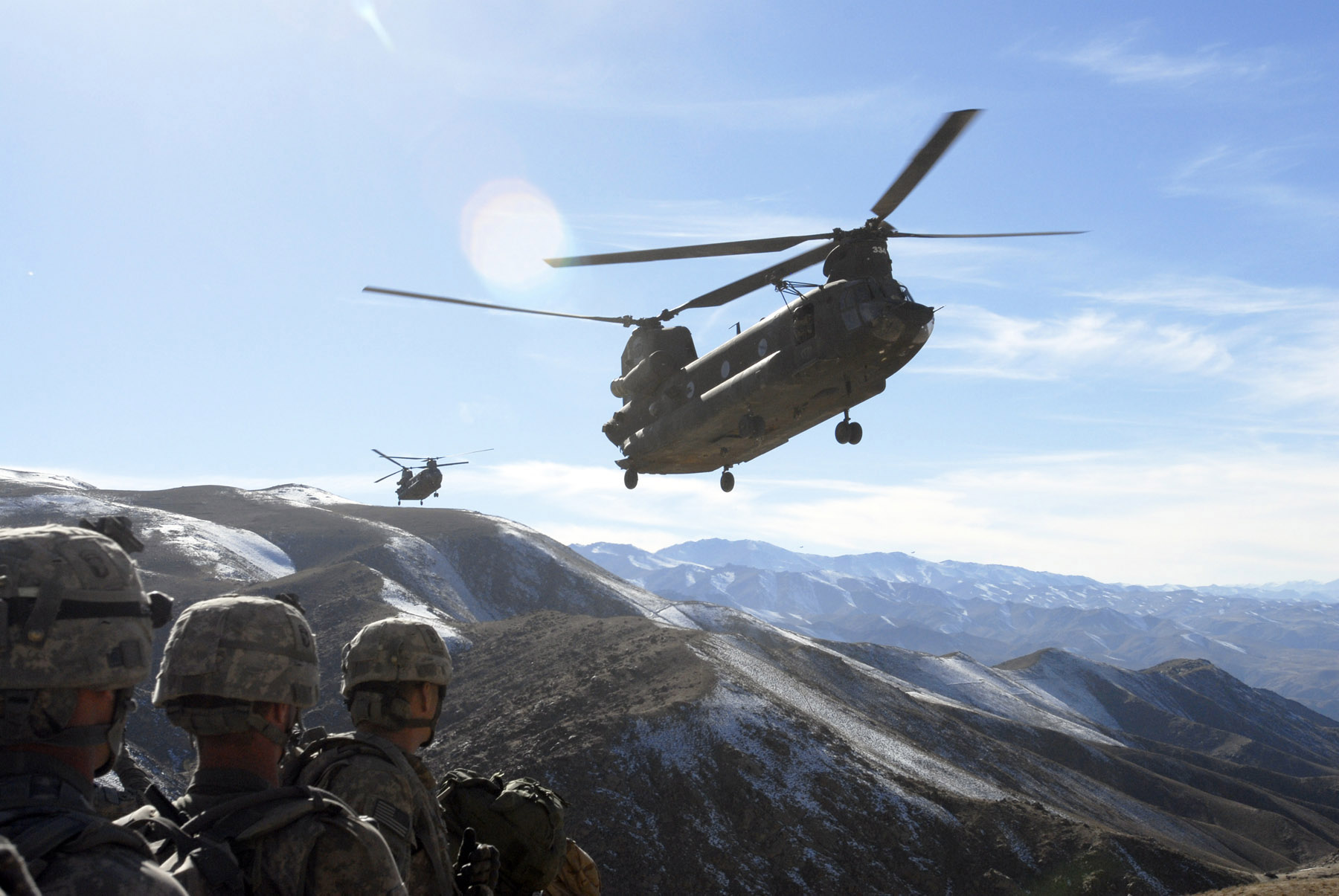
Chinook heavy lift chopper in action

== Korea and Inactivation ==
The 17th was reactivated in Korea on 1 June 1975. In Korea the group continued its logistics and combat aviation role in support of the US Forces Korea (USFK), ROK-US Combined Forces Command (CFC), and Eighth United States Army (EUSA). Equipment assets included UH-1H Huey helicopters, OH-58A/C helicopters, UH-60 Blackhawk helicopters, CH-47 Chinook heavy lift choppers, and C-12 Huron fixed-wing aircraft. The Brigade also contained the two UH-60 ESSS CINC Hawk helicopters used for special transportation needs of the Theater Commander. In Korea the 17th received air traffic control from the 164th Air Traffic Services Group, which provided ATC services throughout the entire Korean theater in support of all Army aviation operations.

Beret Flash of the 17th Aviation Brigade's Pathfinder Platoon

On 17 October 1987 the group was redesignated as the 17th Aviation Brigade. As a brigade, it was authorized its own shoulder sleeve insignia, which became authorized on 9 June 1988, And Was Designed by CSM Jerry O Knapp

At its height in Korea, the 17th Aviation Brigade consisted of 1-501st Aviation (Assault), 2-501st Aviation (Lift), 4-501st Aviation (Attack), 5-501st Aviation (Attack), and 4-58th Aviation (ATC). The Brigade was also the United States component of the ROK/US Combined Aviation Force (CAF). The CAF was a division-sized combat aviation organization, activated in wartime, made up of approximately one-third US Army aviation and two-thirds ROK Army aviation elements.

Additionally, the Brigade provided the US Army aviation component of the Combined Unconventional Warfare Task Force (CUWTF), consisting of the staff and Bravo Company from the 1-501st Aviation (later 1-52d Aviation).

As a result of As part of the overall restructuring of Army forces, in June 2005 the brigade was inactivated, along with the 6th Cavalry Brigade (Air Combat), and most of the assets of both brigades were merged into the Combat Aviation Brigade, 2d Infantry Division in Korea, although some aircraft were reallocated to units in Alaska and Hawaii. At the time of the 17th's inactivation it had one of the last pathfinder units in the entire US Army, the other being assigned to the 101st Airborne Division (Air Assault) at Fort Campbell, KY. The last pathfinder commander was Captain Derek Martin and the last pathfinder Team Leader was SSG Donald Jordan.
