= 229th Aviation Regiment =

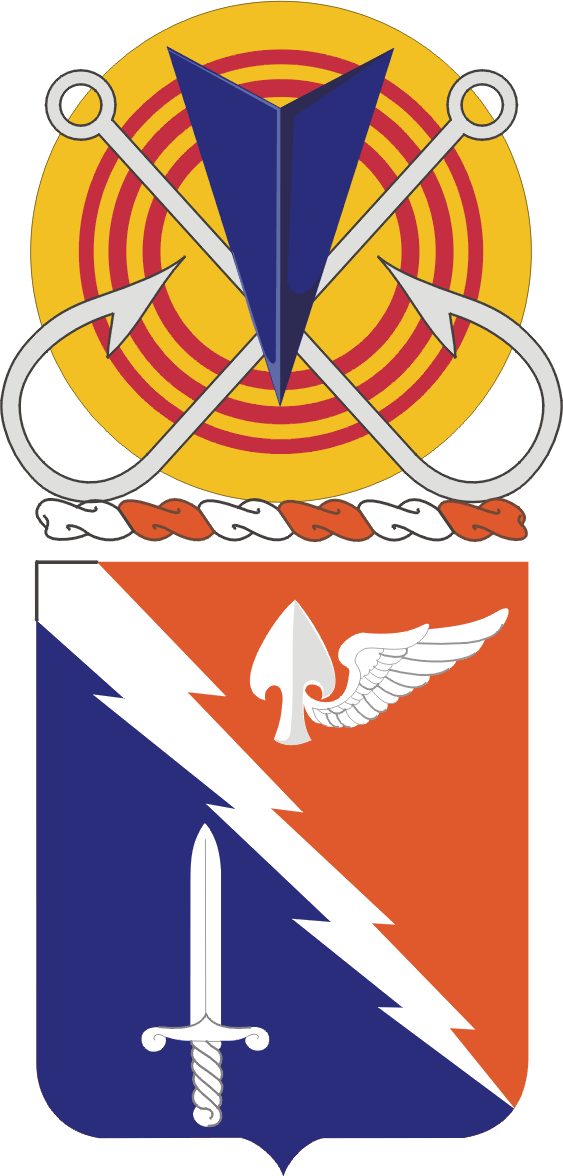
- Coat of Arms
- Active: 1964-present
- Country: United States
- Branch: United States Army Aviation Branch
- Type: Aviation
- Role: Attack, Close air support, Aerial Reconnaissance, Combat search and rescue
- Garrison/HQ: Multipile battalions on different bases
- Mottos: WINGED ASSAULT, Death From Above

Insignia
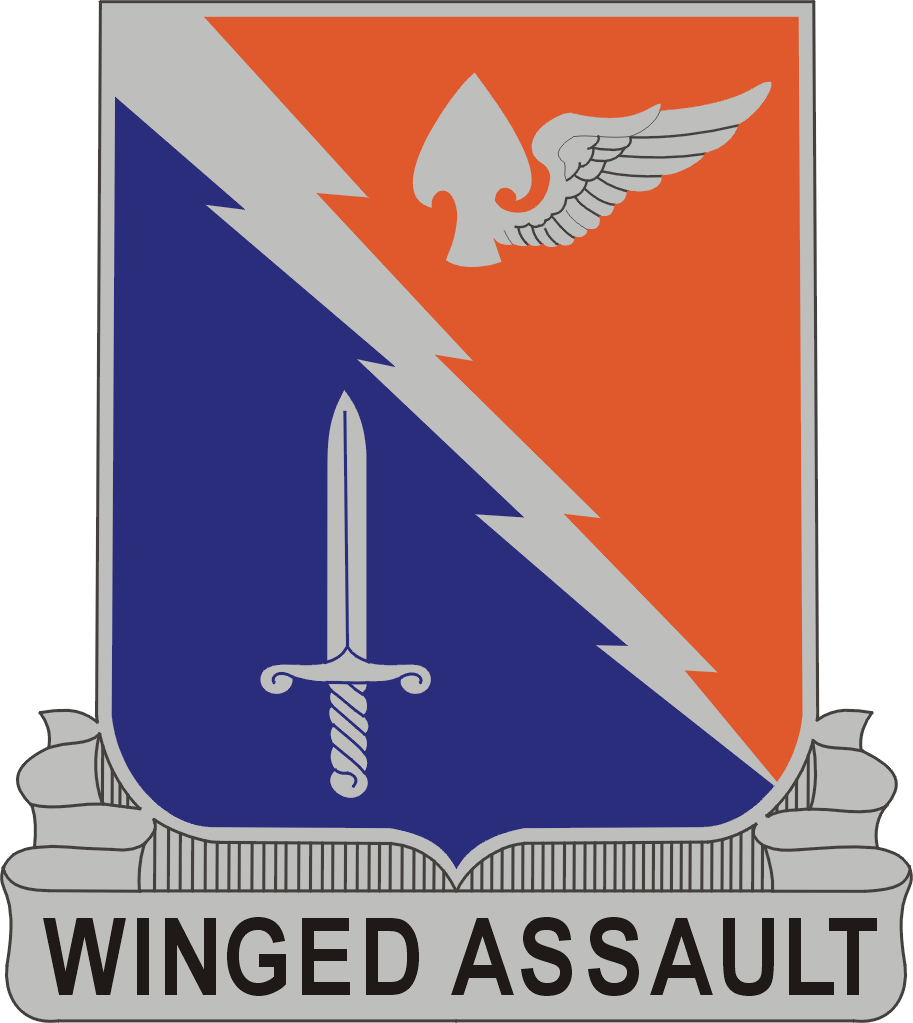
- Distinctive Unit Insignia

Aircraft flown
- Attack helicopter: AH-64D/E Apache
- Utility helicopter: UH-60L Black Hawk
- Reconnaissance: MQ-1C Gray Eagle

The 229th Aviation Regiment is an aviation unit of the United States Army.

== 229th Assault Helicopter Battalion and 229th Aviation Battalion ==
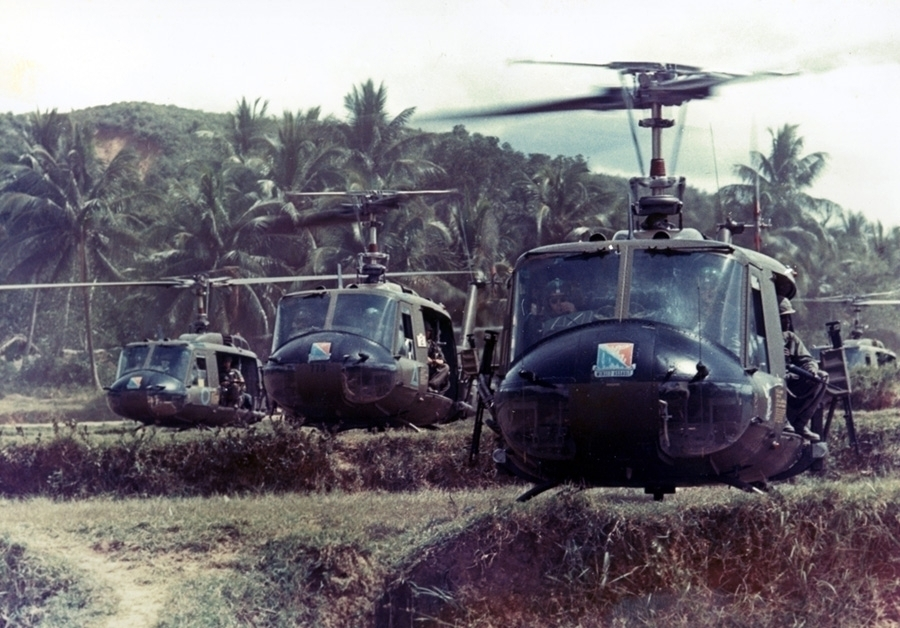
UH-1 helicopters from Alpha Company, 229th Aviation Regiment

The unit was constituted on 18 March 1964 in the Regular Army as the 229th Assault Helicopter Battalion, an element of the 11th Aviation Group, 11th Air Assault Division (Test) and activated on 19 March 1964 at Fort Benning, Georgia. It was redesignated on 1 July 1965 as the 229th Aviation Battalion, an element of the 1st Cavalry Division (Airmobile), when the assets of the 11th Air Assault Division (Test) and the 2d Infantry Division were merged and reflagged as the 1st Cavalry Division (Airmobile). The 229th Aviation Battalion (Assault Helicopter) took part in the Vietnam War and remained behind when the 11th Aviation Group departed with the bulk of the division, providing support to the 3rd Brigade, 1st Cavalry Division (Airmobile) at Bien Hoa in June 1971. The following units were part of the 229th in Vietnam:

- Company A (Assault Helicopter), September 1965-August 1972, departed Vietnam
- Company B (Assault Helicopter), September 1965-August 1972, departed Vietnam
- Company C (Assault Helicopter), September 1965-August 1972, departed Vietnam
- Company D (Aerial Weapons), September 1965-August 1972, departed Vietnam
- 362d Aviation Company (Assault Support Helicopter), June 1971-August 1972, departed Vietnam
- Troop F, 9th Cavalry (Air Cavalry), June 1971-August 1972, transferred to the 12th Aviation Group

Troop F, 9th Cavalry was formed in Vietnam as Troop H, 16th Cavalry, a designation never approved by the Department of the Army. Properly Troop F, 9th Cavalry, its true designation was not used in Vietnam until the May 1972 time frame. Many records of the period June 1971-May 1972 show this particular unit under its unauthorized designation.

Source: Vietnam Order of Battle: A Complete Illustrated Reference to U.S. Army Combat and Support Forces in Vietnam 1961-1973 by Shelby L. Stanton

The 229th departed Vietnam on 12 August 1972 and was inactivated ten days later at Fort Hood, Texas, where it was relieved from assignment to the 1st Cavalry Division. It was reactivated on 21 September 1978 at Fort Campbell, Kentucky, as an element of the 101st Airborne Division (Air Assault). During much of the 1980s its Company D was based at Fort Rucker, Alabama. Concurrent with the redesignation of aviation units to a regimental system, the 229th was inactivated on 16 October 1987 at Fort Campbell, and relieved from assignment to the 101st Airborne Division (Air Assault). Subsequently, the lineages of the lettered companies of the battalion were reorganized and redesignated as the HHCs of numbered battalions (i.e., Co A became HHC, 1st Bn, 229th Avn; Co B became HHC, 2d Bn, 229th Avn, etc.). Beyond Company D, new battalions of the 229th Aviation Regiment (such as the 8th Battalion) were activated with no prior history from the era of the 229th Aviation Battalion.

In 1988, five members of the original Flying Tigers came to Fort Hood to designate the newly reactivated 4th Bn and the rest of the 229th Aviation Regiment the Flying Tigers. At the ceremony retired Maj. Gen. Charles R. Bond said "I just want to choke up when I think about our name living on with these young fliers. If anyone can live up to the Flying Tigers' name, I'm sure it's these soldiers." Coincidently, the Flying Tigers had 229 aerial victories making the name even more fitting.

During the 1990-91 Gulf War, the 2d Battalion, 229th Aviation served with the 101st Airborne Division (Air Assault), the 4th Battalion, 229th Aviation with the 11th Aviation Brigade, the 5th Battalion, 229th Aviation with the ARCENT Aviation Brigade, reflagged as the Aviation Brigade, 2d Armored Division, and Company A, 5th Battalion, 229th Aviation with the 3d Armored Division.

Source: Order of Battle: Allied Ground Forces of Operation Desert Storm, 9-9 by Thomas D. Dinackus

== 1st Battalion (Attack Reconnaissance) ==
Company A, 229th Aviation Battalion was redesignated on 16 September 1989 as Company A, 229th Aviation, then redesignated again on 6 January 1992 as Headquarters and Headquarters Company, 1st Battalion, 229th Aviation, and activated at Fort Hood, Texas (organic elements concurrently constituted and activated). The 1st Battalion, 229th Aviation Regiment, nicknamed the Tigersharks, was an attack helicopter battalion operating AH-64 Apache attack and OH-58 Kiowa scout helicopters. It was stationed at Fort Bragg, North Carolina after moving from Fort Hood, Texas following graduation from the Apache Training Brigade (later called the Combat Aviation Training Brigade).

The battalion deployed to Kandahar Airfield during June 2002 as part of Operation Enduring Freedom.

The battalion was assigned to the 18th Aviation Brigade and was inactivated on 15 May 2004, concurrent with the inactivation of the brigade. The 1st Battalion, 229th Aviation Regiment was reactivated on 23 July 2010 at Fort Hood, Texas, by reflagging the assets of the 4th Squadron, 3d Armored Cavalry Regiment. The battalion is now assigned to the 16th Combat Aviation Brigade, Gray Army Airfield at Joint Base Lewis–McChord, Washington.

Structure:

- HHC "Hacksaw"
- Company A "Serpents" (AH-64D/E)
  - Afghanistan June - December 2002 / HQ at Bagram.
  - Present / HQ at Gray Army Airfield
- Company B "Killer Spades" (AH-64D/E)
  - Afghanistan June - December 2002 / HQ at Bagram.
  - Present / HQ at Gray Army Airfield
- Company C "Blue Max" (AH-64D/E)
  - Afghanistan June - December 2002 / HQ at Kandahar.
  - Present / HQ at Gray Army Airfield
- Company D "Hammerhead" (Maintenance)
- Company E "Havoc" (Forward Support Company)

== 2nd Battalion ==
The lineage of Company B, 229th Aviation Battalion was reorganized and redesignated as HHC, 2d Battalion, 229th Aviation Regiment. Nicknamed the Flying Tigers, the battalion is the only United States Army attack helicopter unit in history to have captured enemy troops. During Desert Storm the battalion captured 527 enemy combatants, serving with the 101st Airborne Division (Air Assault). "The number of prisoners (527) is probably a record for EPWs captured by a helicopter unit." The unit flew AH-64 Apache attack, OH-58C Kiowa Scout, and UH-60L Black Hawk dedicated SAR helicopters. The unit was based at Guthrie Field, Fort Rucker, Alabama. This battalion was assigned to the 18th Aviation Brigade from 1987 to 1995, when it was inactivated.

In the winter of 2014, Company B was reactivated at Fort Irwin, CA as an unmanned aviation company, flying the General Atomics MQ-1C Gray Eagle. There they have deployed to Kuwait, Iraq, and Afghanistan.

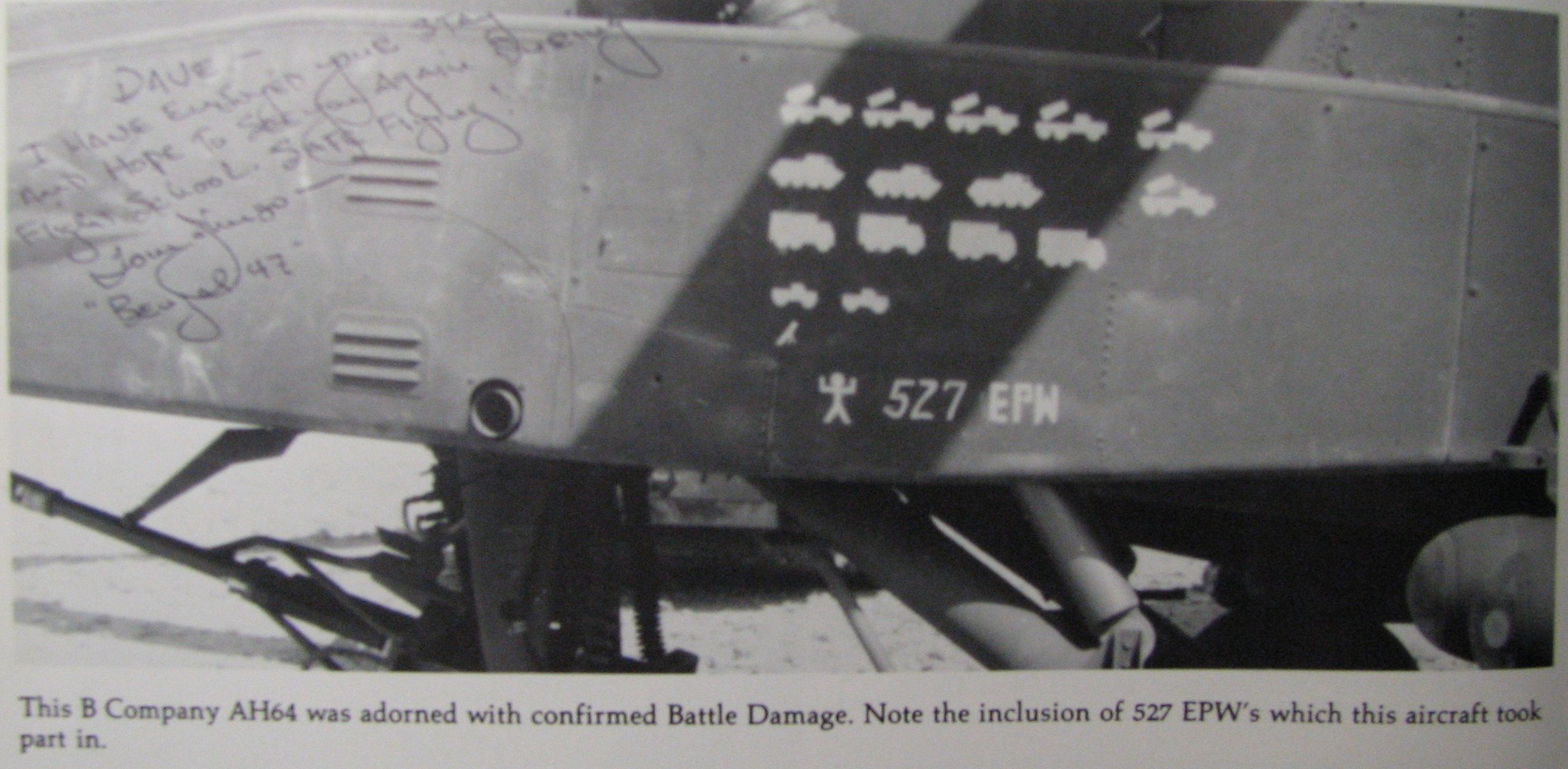

== 3rd Battalion ==
Company C, 229th Aviation Battalion was redesignated on 6 January 1992 as Headquarters and Headquarters Company, 3rd Battalion, 229th Aviation, and activated at Fort Hood, Texas (organic elements concurrently constituted and activated) on 10 January 1992 under the command of LTC John E. Pack. The 3rd Battalion, 229th Aviation Regiment, nicknamed the Flying Tigers, was an attack helicopter battalion operating AH-64 Apache attack and OH-58 Kiowa scout helicopters and a Headquarters detachment of UH-60 Blackhawks. Each of the 3 line companies (A, B, and C) contained 6 Apache and 4 Kiowa helicopters. There was also D Company which handled higher level maintenance to include armament and avionics. The 3/229th was stationed at Simmons Army Airfield, Fort Bragg, North Carolina after moving from Fort Hood, Texas following graduation from the Apache Training Brigade (later called the Combat Aviation Training Brigade).

The battalion was assigned to the 18th Aviation Brigade and was inactivated on 15 May 2004, concurrent with the inactivation of the brigade.

Deployments:

- Afghanistan December 2002 - August 2003

== 4th Battalion ==
The 4th Battalion was the first battalion activated under the new regimental system in June 1988 at Ft. Hood, Texas under the command of LTC Gerald Saltness. The formal designation was 4th Battalion - 229th Advanced Attack Helicopter Regiment (AAHR). During its time at Ft. Hood, the 4th-229th requested permission from the American Volunteer Group to formally use the "Flying Tigers" name. The AVG granted that permission and several of the original Flying Tigers, including David "Tex" Hill, John Richard "Dick" Rossi and Ed Rector attended the unit activation at Hood AAF in June 1988 (along with a CAF P-40 that landed at Hood AAF for the ceremony). As additional battalions were activated, they too were designated "Flying Tigers" as the name applied to the Regiment and not just the individual battalions. The unit completed the Apache Training Brigade Unit Training Program in October 1988 and completed a unit move with its 21 AH-64A and 3 UH-60A aircraft to Illesheim, West Germany where it was assigned to the 11th Avn Bde. Upon arrival in Illesheim, the Battalion received 13 refurbished OH-58C Kiowa helicopters. In November 1990, the unit was alerted that it would deploy along with VII Corps to Saudi Arabia for Operation DESERT SHIELD and DESERT STORM. The Battalion flew two night "Deep Attack" missions on 26–27 February 1991 and spent time at As Salman AB and along with the French forces, patrolled the westernmost portion of the coalition flank, including up to the Euphrates River to ensure Iraqi forces abided by the agreed upon cease fire terms. The Battalion was awarded the Valorous Unit Award for its performance during DESERT STORM and redeployed to Illesheim in April and May 1991.

== 8th Battalion ==
The unit was constituted on 16 September 1989 in the Army Reserve as the 8th Battalion, 229th Aviation and activated on 17 September 1989 at Fort Knox, Kentucky. In 1999 the Battalion was ordered to Active Duty in support of NATO SFOR in Bosnia-Herzegovina, stationed at Comanche Base, BiH. It was again ordered into active military service on 6 June 2004 in support of Operation Iraqi Freedom, released on 28 December 2005 and reverted to reserve status. It was redesignated on 1 October 2005 as the 8th Battalion, 229th Aviation Regiment, and on 7 October 2010 it was ordered into active military service again in support of Operation New Dawn in Iraq. It has since reverted to reserve status. 8-229th was officially designated by the American Volunteer Group (AVG) to carry the "Flying Tigers" name. As part of the U.S. Army Reserves restructuring of its aviation assets the unit was redesignated as an assault helicopter battalion flying the UH-60 Blackhawk and ending its mission as an attack helicopter battalion in the fall of 2014. In April 2019 the battalion deployed to Camp Buehring, Kuwait in support of Operations Spartan Shield and Inherent Resolve.

== See also ==
- List of United States Army aircraft battalions
