= Camp Holloway =

US-Army base during the Vietnam War

Camp Holloway (Holloway Airfield)
- Pleiku, Central Highlands in Vietnam
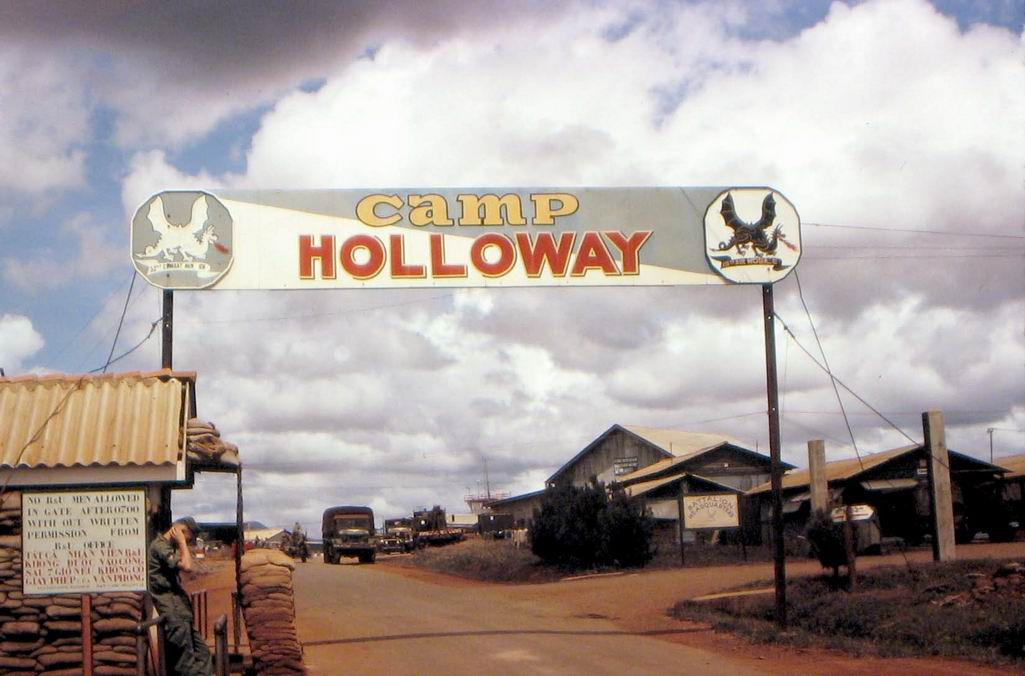
- Camp Holloway gate in 1965/6

Site information
- Type: Army Base
- Operator: Army of the Republic of Vietnam (ARVN); United States Army (U.S. Army)

Location
- Shown within Vietnam
- Coordinates: 13.973°N 108.031°E

Site history
- Built: 1962
- In use: 1962-
- Battles/wars: Vietnam War

Garrison information
- Garrison: 4th Infantry Division

Airfield information
- Elevation: 2,460 feet (750 m) AMSL
Runways
Direction	Length and surface
00/00	4,100 feet (1,250 m) PSP

Camp Holloway is a former U.S. Army base near Pleiku in central Vietnam.

== History ==
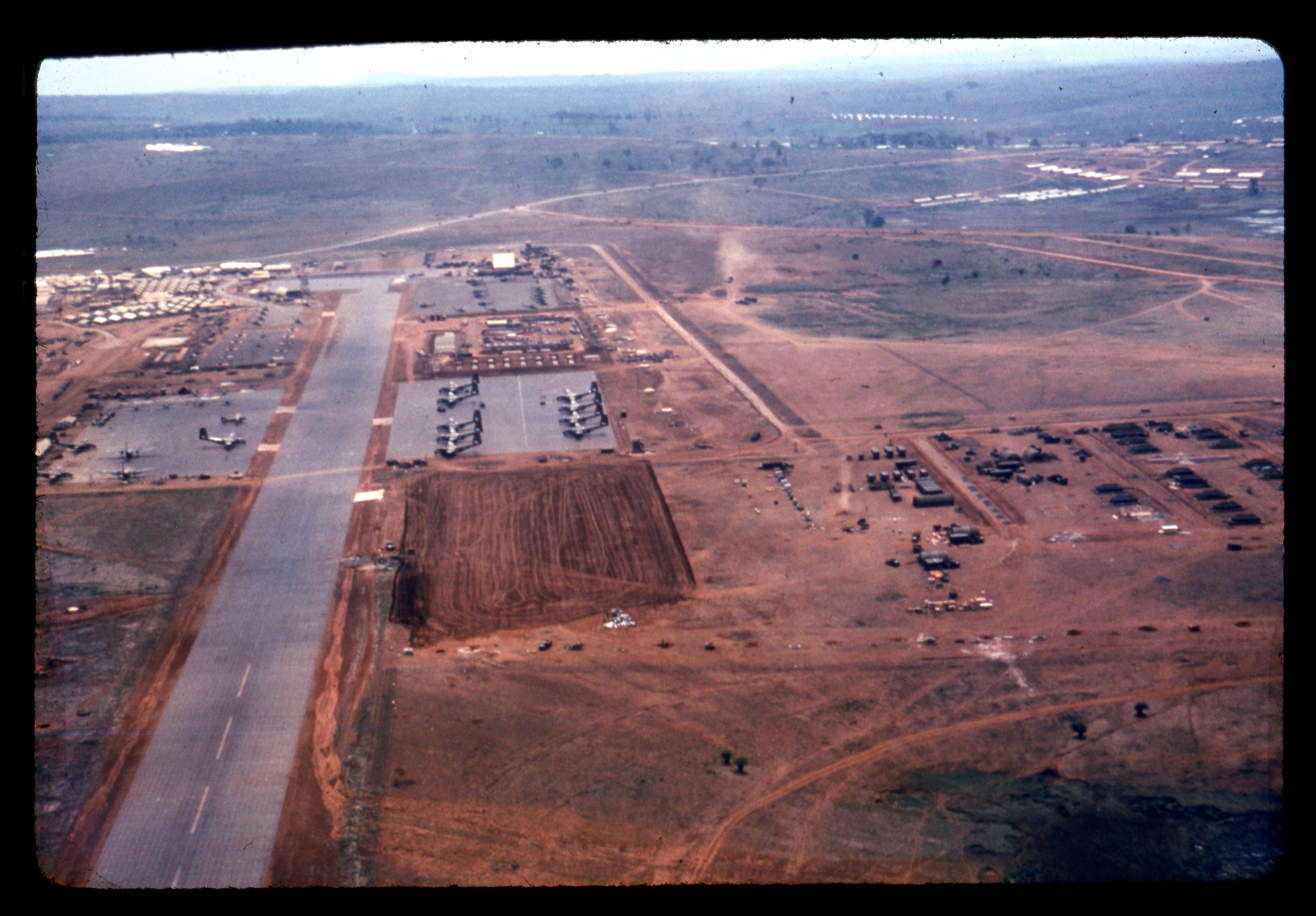
Holloway Airfield, 13 April 1966

Camp Holloway was established in 1962. It was located along Route 19 approximately 3km east of Pleiku in the Central Highlands of South Vietnam. The camp was named in 1963 for Piasecki CH-21 helicopter pilot Warrant Officer Charles E. Holloway, who in December 1962 became the first aviator assigned to the 81st Transportation Company to be killed in action in South Vietnam.

A Viet Cong attack in the early morning hours of February 7, 1965, killed seven, wounded 104 and destroyed 10 aircraft. At the time CIA Analyst Chester L. Cooper and national security adviser McGeorge Bundy were visiting Saigon on behalf of the State Department to assess the war. The attack prompted U.S. President Lyndon B. Johnson to begin bombing North Vietnam. A 1997 meeting between American and Vietnamese officials revealed that the attack was not ordered by Hanoi, nor were they aware of Cooper and Bundy's visit.

In December 1965, the 170th Aviation Company joined with the 119th to create the 52nd Aviation Battalion. The base eventually expanded to house the headquarters of the 52d Combat Aviation Battalion, now part of the 17th Combat Aviation Group, 1st Aviation Brigade. At its peak, Camp Holloway was home to two additional UH-1 Huey assault helicopter companies, the 179th Aviation Support Helicopter Company Boeing CH-47A Chinook, an Cessna O-1 Bird Dog unit, the 219th Reconnaissance Airplane Company (Headhunters), a Sikorsky CH-54 Skycrane company, and other supporting units. B Troop, 7th Squadron, 17th Air Cavalry also was stationed at Camp Holloway for a period of time.

At 02:30 on 26 January 1968 the camp was attacked by mortar fire and sappers from two companies of the People's Army of Vietnam (PAVN) 408th Sapper Battalion resulting in five UH-1 helicopters and one ammunition storage area destroyed.

In 1973 Camp Holloway was transferred to the Army of the Republic of Vietnam. Today it serves as a training base for the PAVN.

The following units were also here:

- 43rd Signal Battalion
- 2nd Battalion, 320th Artillery Regiment
