= 16th Combat Aviation Brigade =

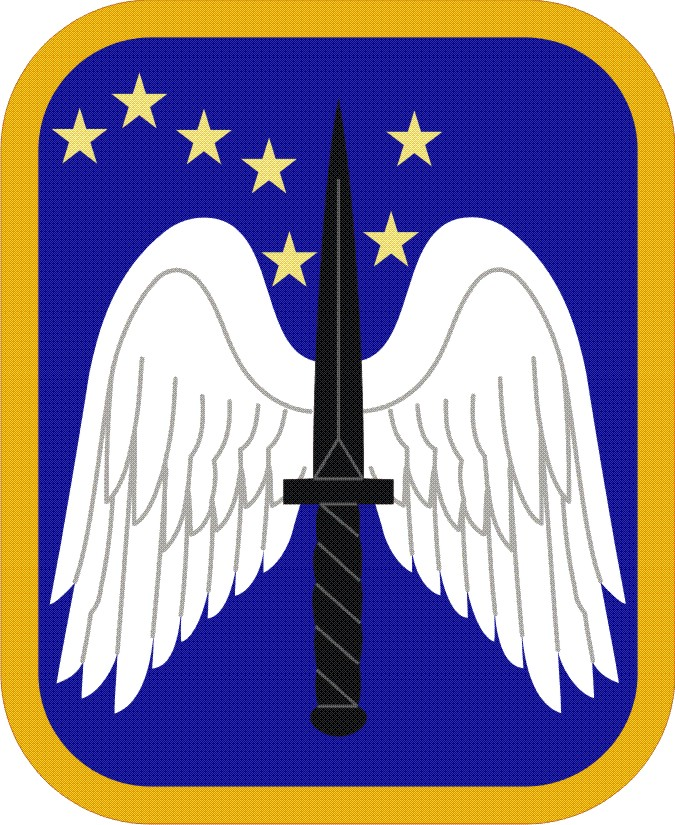
- Shoulder sleeve insignia
- Active: 16 October 2009 – present
- Country: United States
- Branch: United States Army
- Type: Combat Aviation Brigade
- Role: Aviation
- Size: Brigade
- Part of: 7th Infantry Division; I Corps
- Garrison/HQ: Joint Base Lewis–McChord (JBLM) (Gray Army Airfield)
- Motto: Born in Battle / Wings of the Bayonet

Commanders
- Current commander: COL Tyler Cody
- Notable commanders: Jack V. Mackmull

Insignia
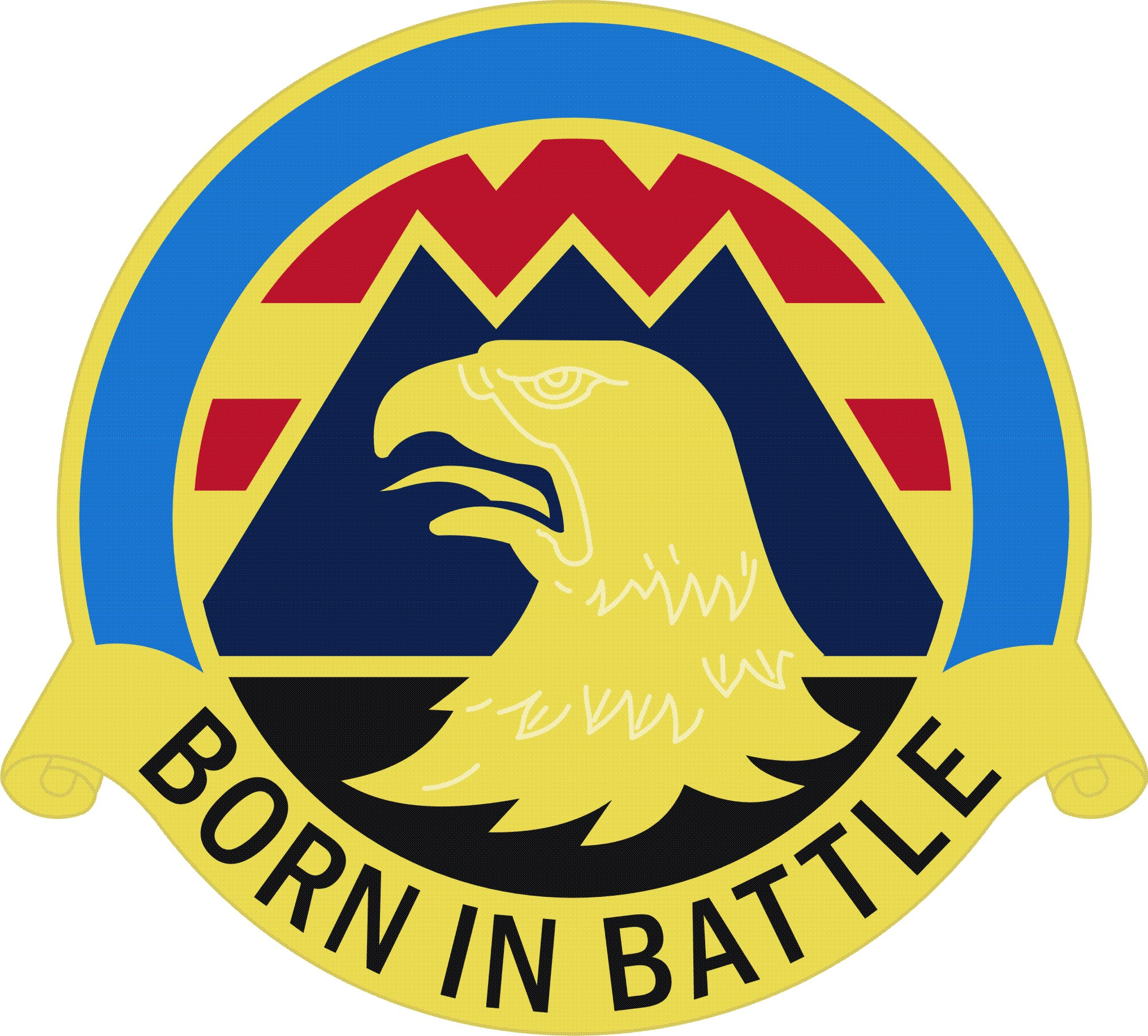
- Distinctive unit insignia

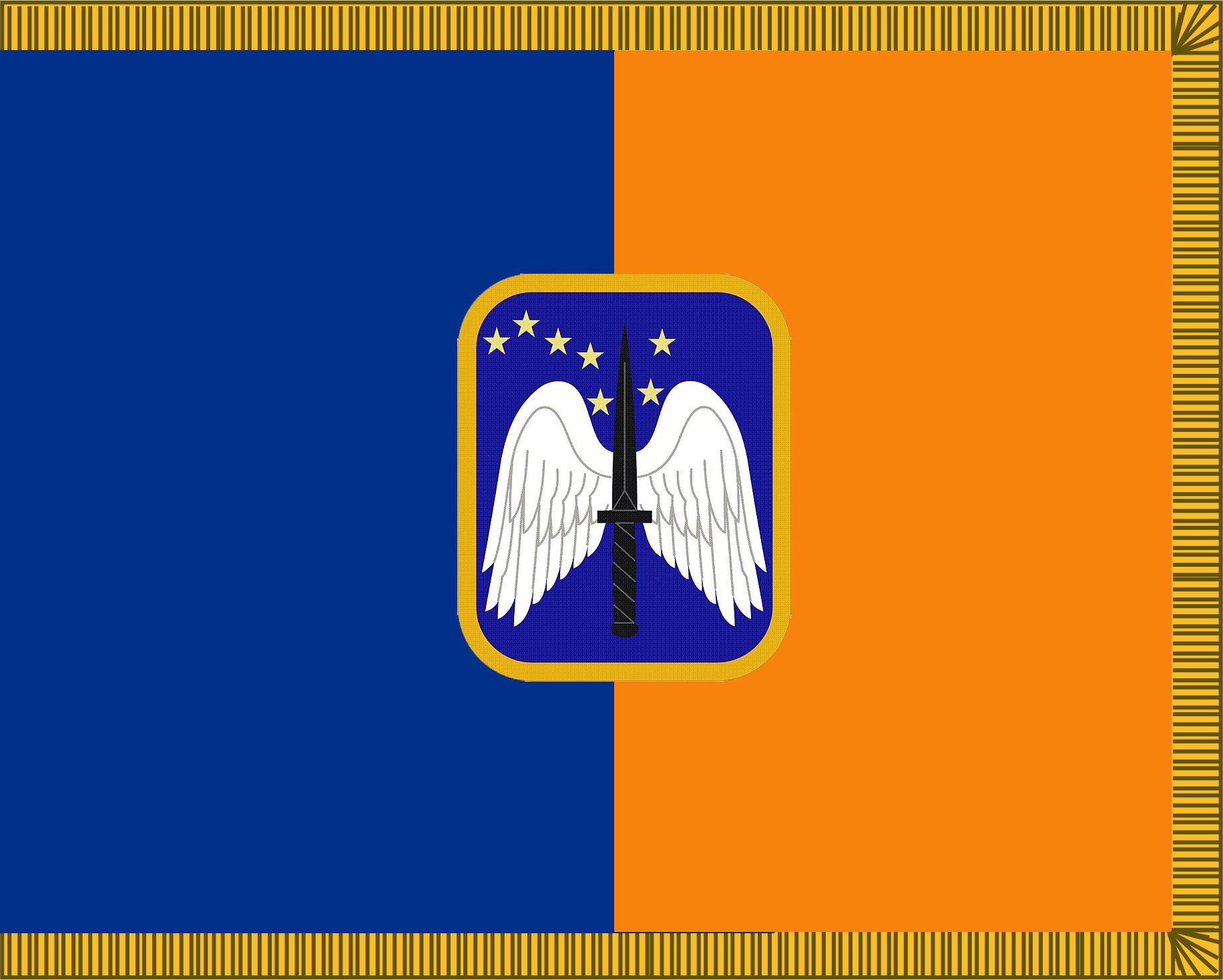
- 16th Combat Aviation Brigade

The 16th Combat Aviation Brigade is a Combat Aviation Brigade of the United States Army. It is subordinate to 7th Infantry Division and I Corps and based at Gray Army Airfield part of Joint Base Lewis-McChord (JBLM).

== Structure ==
The 16th Combat Aviation Brigade currently consists of the following units:

- Headquarters and Headquarters Company (HHC)
  - 1st Battalion (Attack), 229th Aviation Regiment, AH-64E Apache
  - 2nd Battalion (Assault), 158th Aviation Regiment, UH-60 Black Hawk
  - 1st Battalion (General Support), 52nd Aviation Regiment, UH-60, CH-47 Chinook and UH-60A+ (MEDEVAC) (supporting US Army Alaska)
  - 46th Aviation Support Battalion

== History ==
The brigade traces its history to the activation of the 16th Aviation Group (Combat) on 23 January 1968 subordinate to United States Army Pacific at Marble Mountain in Da Nang, South Vietnam. At the time of activation the group consisted of the 14th Aviation Battalion (Combat) and the 212th Aviation Battalion (Combat Support) with a total combat force 3,300 personnel. Operating in the I Corps area, its 14th Aviation Battalion (Combat) provided air assault to the 101st Airborne Division and the United States Marine Corps. The 212th Aviation Battalion (Combat Support) carried out aerial reconnaissance and surveillance.

Structure between February and March 1971:

- 335th Transportation Company
- 362nd Aviation Detachment
- 123rd Aviation Battalion
- Troop D, 1st Squadron, 1st Cavalry
- Troop F, 8th Cavalry
- Company E, 723rd Maintenance Battalion
- 14th Aviation Battalion
- 71st Aviation Company
- 116th Aviation Company
- 132nd Aviation Company
- 174th Aviation Company
- 176th Aviation Company
- 178th Aviation Company
- 534th Medical Detachment
- 756th Medical Detachment

In the years after the war the group was disbanded.

In October 2005 Task Force 49 was formed at Fort Wainwright, Alaska. It oversaw 1st Battalion, 52d Aviation Regiment; 4th Battalion, 123rd Aviation Regiment; 68th Medical Company (Air Ambulance); and Company C (Maintenance), 123d Aviation Regiment. In February 2006 Task Force 49 was formally established and the 4th Battalion, 123d Aviation Regiment was inactivated, while the 1st Battalion, 52d Aviation Regiment was reorganized into a general support aviation battalion. In June 2006 the 6th Squadron, 17th Cavalry Regiment was reflagged from 3d Squadron, 4th Cavalry Regiment, flying OH-58D Kiowa Warrior light reconnaissance helicopters and relocated from Wheeler Army Airfield, Hawaii to Fort Wainwright.

On 16 October 2009, Aviation Task Force 49 was disbanded, and "reflagged" as 16th Combat Aviation Brigade, and thus activated at Fort Wainwright, Alaska.

On 31 March 2011, it was announced that the 16th Combat Aviation Brigade would be based at Joint Base Lewis McChord but still keep a substantial presence (1–52d Aviation) at Fort Wainwright. It was also announced that the 4th Squadron, 6th Cavalry Regiment would join the brigade and that 1st Battalion, 229th Aviation would move from Fort Hood to JBLM. Joint Base Lewis-McChord held a flag ceremony on 1 August 2011 to signify the movement of the headquarters of the 16th Combat Aviation Brigade from Fort Wainwright, Alaska. This process would end around September 2014.
