= 82nd Aviation Regiment =

82d Aviation Regiment
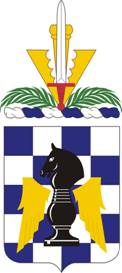
- Coat of arms
- Active: 1957
- Country: USA
- Branch: United States Army Aviation Branch
- Type: Aviation
- Motto: GROUND AIR MOBILITY
- Colors: Ultramarine Blue, Golden orange

Insignia
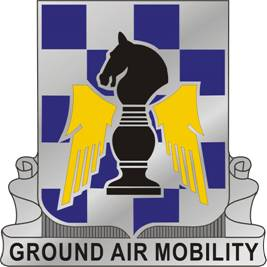
- Distinctive unit insignia

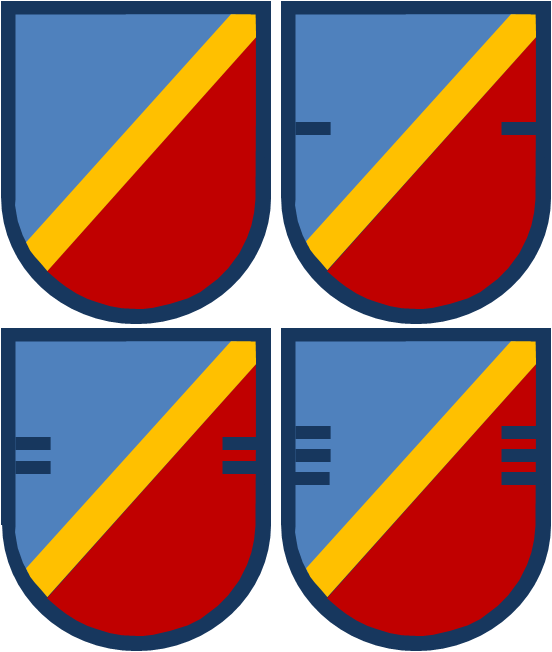
- Unit beret flashes of the Regiment, 1st, 2nd, and 3rd Battalions

Aircraft flown
- Attack helicopter: AH-64E Apache
- Cargo helicopter: CH-47F Chinook
- Utility helicopter: UH-60M Black Hawk
- Reconnaissance: MQ-1C Gray Eagle and AH-64

The 82d Aviation Regiment, part of the U.S. Army, has three battalions and one separate company under the Combat Aviation Brigade, 82nd Airborne Division. The brigade also has the 1st Squadron, 17th Cavalry Regiment and the 122d Aviation Support Battalion. The lineages for the Combat Aviation Brigade, 82d Airborne Division and its subordinate units of the 82d Aviation Regiment, although often mistaken for one another, are separate.

== History ==
Formed in 1957 as the 82nd Aviation Company and then later reorganized as the 82nd Aviation Battalion in 1960. The battalion became the first combat aviation battalion assigned to a division-sized unit in the U.S. Army. In 1987 the 82nd Aviation Battalion would again reorganized as the 82nd Aviation Brigade.

Since then, the “Wings of the Airborne” always answered the nations call. Supporting operations in Vietnam, Desert Shield, Desert Storm, Dominican Republic, Panama, Grenade, the mountains of Afghanistan and the streets of Iraq.

Today’s modern 82nd Combat Aviation Brigade took shape in January 15, 2006. As the U.S. Army sought to better consolidate combat power through the Brigade Combat Team construct for its land forces, the aviation brigades underwent similar realignment to increase its capabilities.

== Distinctive unit insignia ==
- Description

A Silver color metal and enamel device 1 1/8 inches in height overall consisting of a shield blazoned: Checky Azure and Argent, a chess knight in profile Sable between two wings displayed inverted Or. Attached below the shield is a Silver scroll inscribed "GROUND AIR MOBILITY" in Black letters.

- Symbolism

Ultramarine blue and golden orange are the colors used for Aviation. The checky field represents a chess board, symbolic of the battlefield, and refers to the strategy of war. The knight, considered the most versatile piece to guard and aid the queen, placed between wings, symbolizes the mission of the unit and its versatility.

- Background

The distinctive unit insignia was originally approved for the 82d Aviation Battalion on 8 February 1963. It was amended to change the color of the shield on 26 August 1981. The insignia was redesignated for the 82d Aviation Regiment with the description amended on 27 February 1987.

== Coat of arms ==
=== Blazon ===
- Shield

Checky Azure and Argent, a chess knight in profile Sable between two wings displayed inverted Or.

- Crest

From a wreath Argent and Azure, between two palm fronds Vert a pheon Or superimposed by a sword of the first hilted Gules. Motto GROUND AIR MOBILITY.

- Symbolism
- Shield

Ultramarine blue and golden orange are the colors used for Aviation. The checky field represents a chess board, symbolic of the battlefield, and refers to the strategy of war. The knight, considered the most versatile piece to guard and aid the queen, placed between wings, symbolizes the missions of the unit and its versatility.

- Crest

The unit's campaign participation in Grenada is commemorated by the colors of the design elements (yellow, red and green) adapted from the flag of Grenada. The pheon alludes to attack capabilities, swiftness and accuracy in flight. The unsheathed sword symbolizes military preparedness and combat service. The red color of the hilt honors the organization's Meritorious Unit Commendation earned in Southwest Asia. The palm fronds represent victory and their two Southwest Asia campaigns: Defense of Saudi Arabia and the Liberation and Defense of Kuwait.

- Background

The coat of arms was originally approved for the 82d Aviation Battalion on 8 February 1963. It was amended to change the color of the shield on 26 August 1981. It was redesignated for the 82d Aviation Regiment on 27 February 1987. The coat of arms was amended to include a crest on 7 August 2003.

== Current configuration of the Combat Aviation Brigade, 82d Airborne Division ==
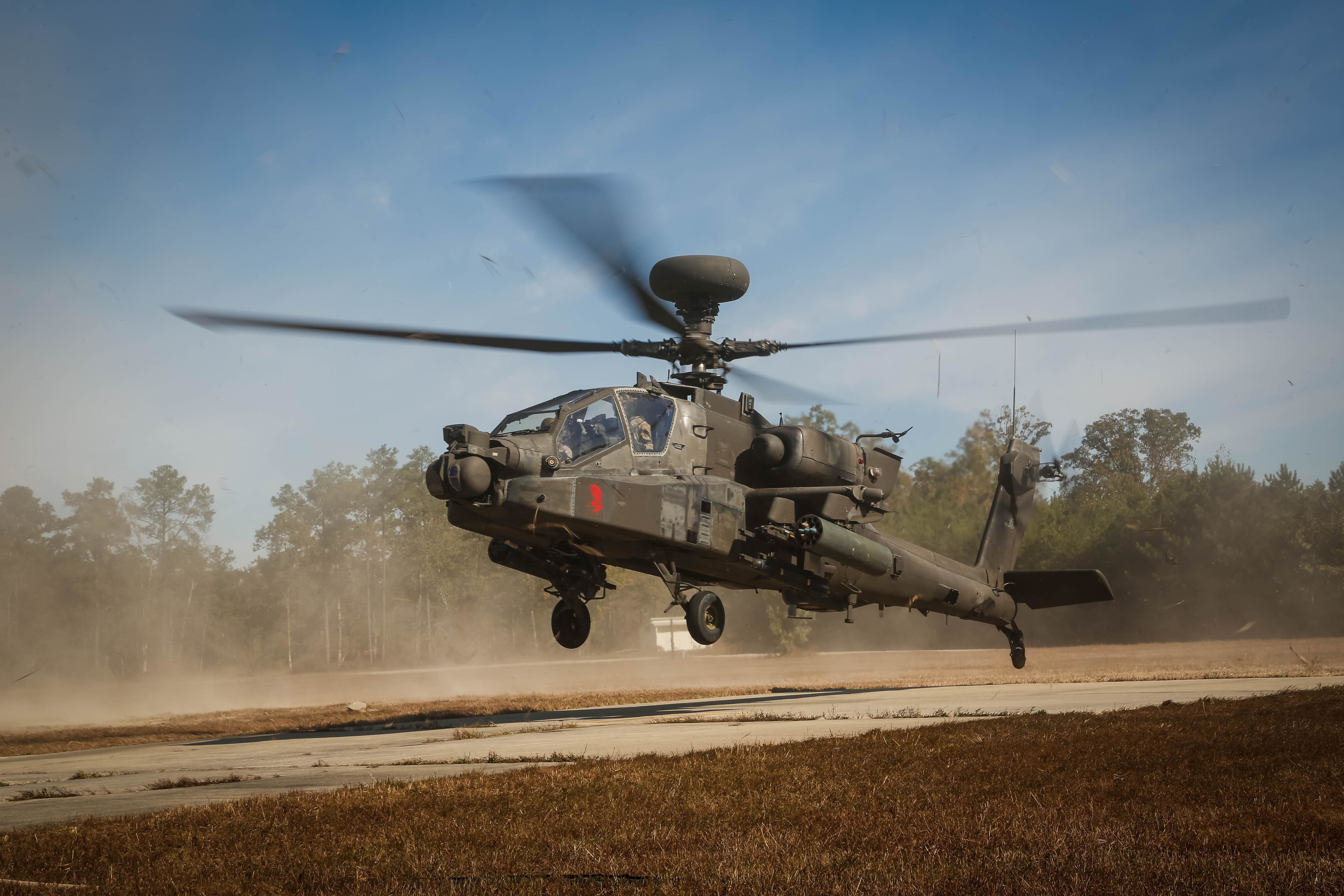
AH-64D Apaches from 1st Battalion (Attack Reconnaissance), 82d Aviation Regiment, descends onto the forward rearming and refueling point to re-load during an aerial gunnery exercise at Fort Walker, VA, 2016

- Headquarters and Headquarters Company (HHC), Combat Aviation Brigade, 82d Airborne Division "Pegasus"
- 1st Battalion (Attack), 82d Aviation Regiment "Wolfpack" (AH-64E)
  - HHC
  - Company A "Redwolves"
  - Company B "Whitewolves"
  - Company C "Bluewolves"
  - Company D "Timberwolves"
  - Company E

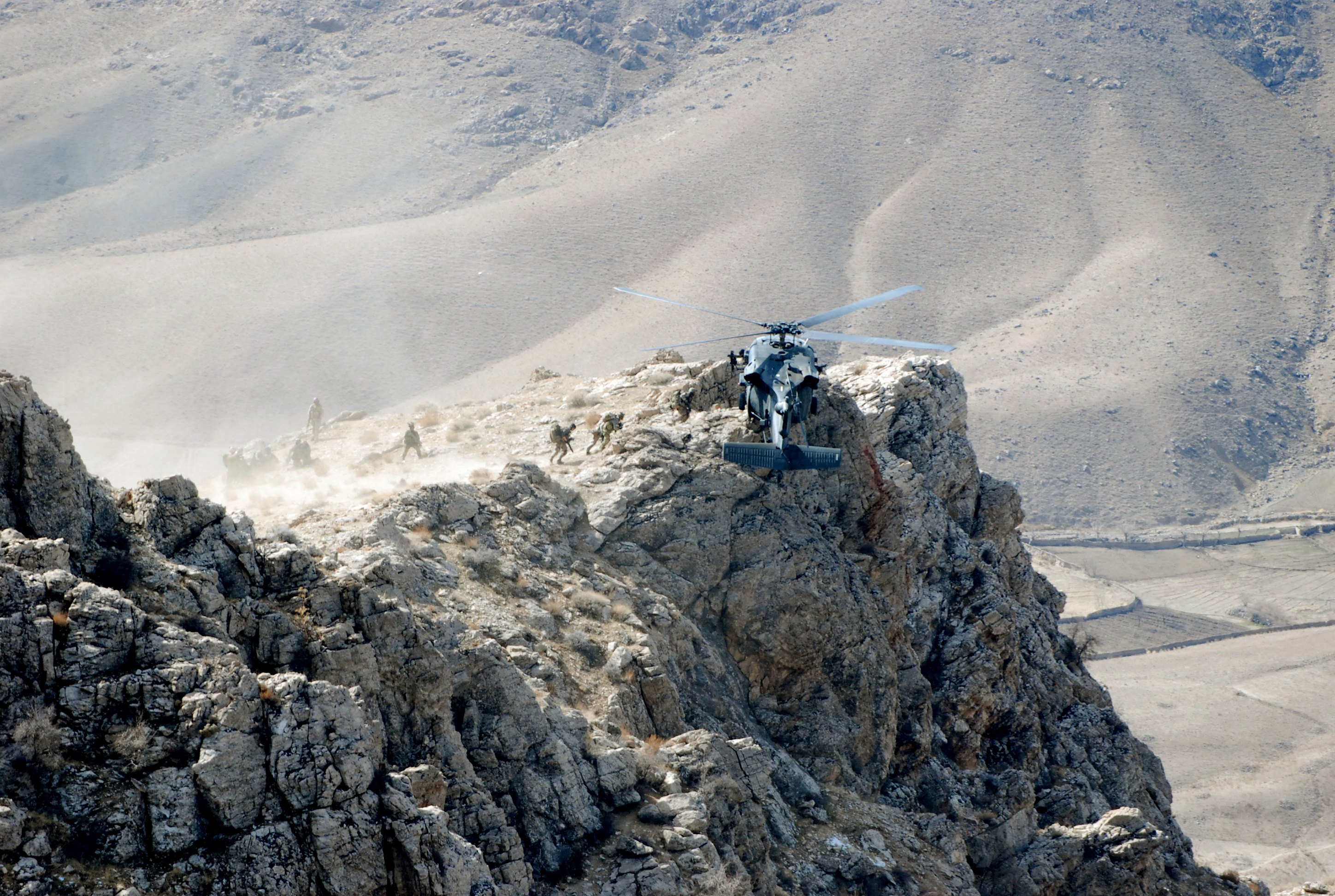
Extraction of a Special Forces detachment by a 2d Battalion, 82d Aviation Regiment UH-60M Black Hawk in Afghanistan, 2010

- 2d Battalion (Assault), 82d Aviation Regiment "Corsair" (UH-60M)
  - HHC "Checkmates"
  - Company A "Redhawks
  - Company B "Cavemen"
  - Company C "Vipers"
  - Company D "Dog Pound"
  - Company E "Lancers"

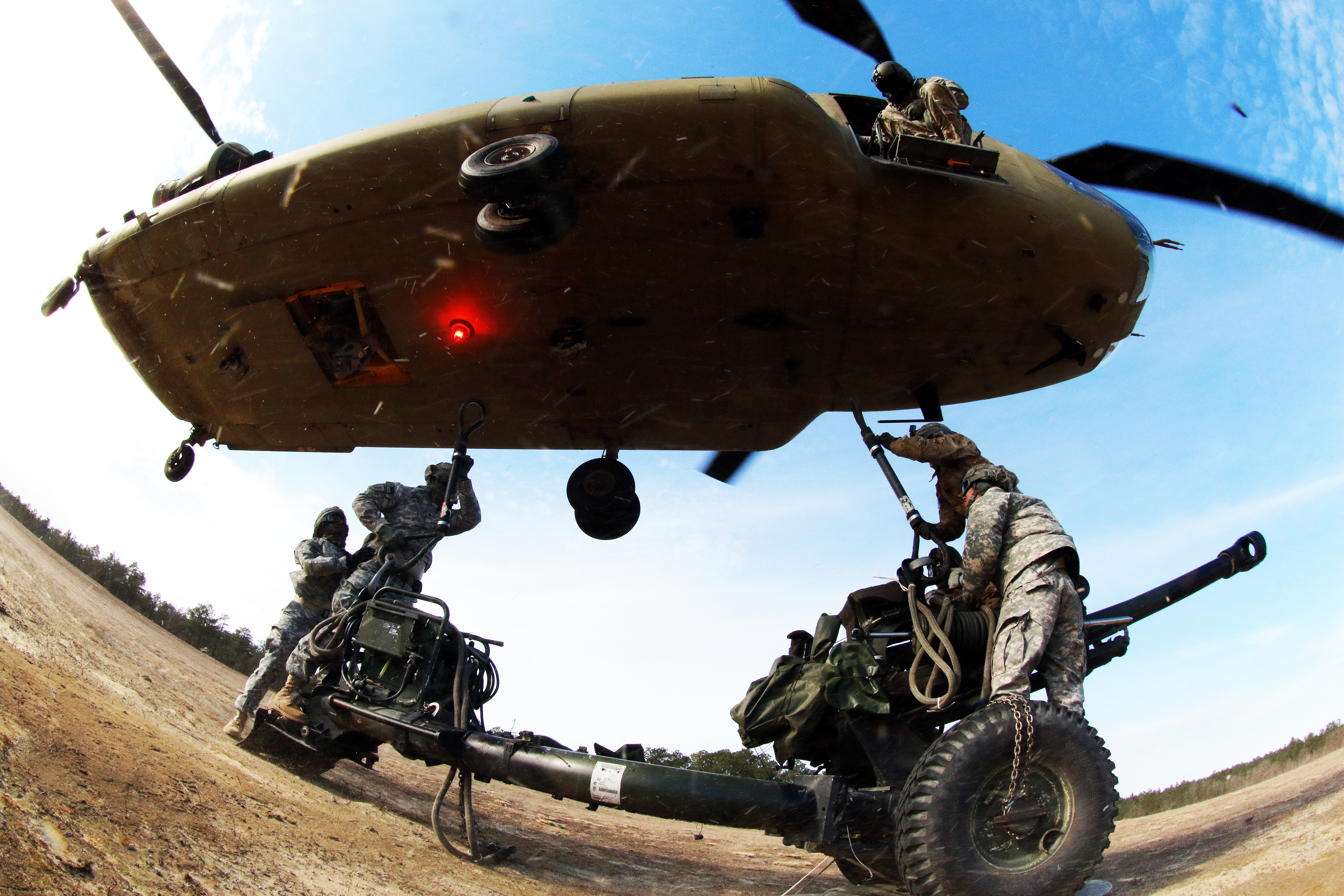
Paratroopers from the 82d Airborne Division Artillery attach a M119A3 Howitzer to a CH-47F Chinook from 3d Battalion, 82d Aviation Regiment during a division artillery readiness test at Fort Bragg, NC, 2016

- 3d Battalion (General Support), 82d Aviation Regiment "Talons" (previously 3d Battalion, 229th Aviation Regiment)
  - HHC
  - Company A "Mustangs" (UH-60M)
  - Company B "Flippers" (CH-47F)
  - Company C "All American Dustoff" (HH-60M)
  - Company D "Darkhorse"
  - Company E
  - Company F "Bad Boys"
- Company D, 82d Aviation Regiment, MQ-1C Gray Eagle (Inactivated 15 June 2006 as an Aviation Intermediate Maintenance (AVIM) unit and reflagged as the 122d Aviation Support Battalion, the lineage of Company D was reactivated as a separate MQ-1C Gray Eagle UAV unit on 16 February 2017. It is not assigned to any of the existing helicopter battalions of the brigade.)
- 1st Squadron (Reconnaissance), 17th Cavalry Regiment "Saber" (AH-64E) – changed to AH-64E from OH-58D in 2017. The 1st Squadron, 17th Cavalry Regiment was officially inactivated and cased its colors during a ceremony on December 15, 2025, at Simmons Army Airfield, Fort Bragg, N.C.
  - Headquarters and Headquarters Troop
  - Troop A
  - Troop B
  - Troop C
  - Troop D
  - Troop E
  - Troop F (UAS)
- 122d Aviation Support Battalion "Atlas"
  - HHC "Opinicus"
  - Company A "Maximus"
  - Company B "Phoenix"
  - Company C "Oracle"

== Decorations ==
- Meritorious Unit Commendation (Army) for Southwest Asia
- Meritorious Unit Commendation (Army) for Afghanistan Operation Enduring Freedom 2009-2010

== See also ==
- United States Army Aviation Branch
- Coats of arms of U.S. Army Aviation Regiments
- U.S. Army Regimental System
