= 25th Combat Aviation Brigade =

- Country: United States
- Allegiance: United States Army
- Type: Aviation
- Size: Brigade
- Part of: 25th Infantry Division
- Nickname(s): Wings of Lightning
- Motto(s): Lele Makou No Na Puali (We Fly For The Troops)

Insignia
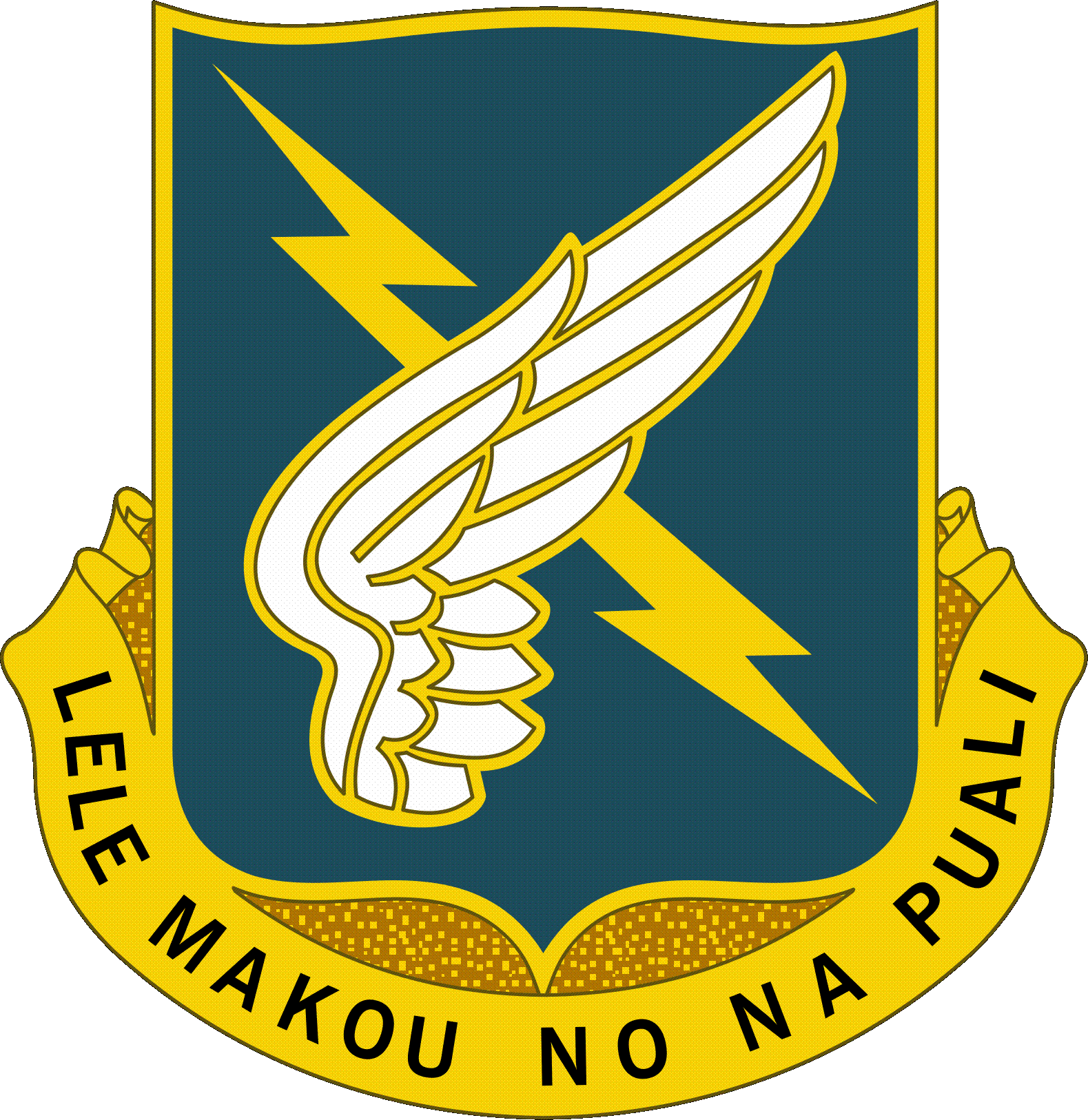
- Distinctive unit insignia

The 25th Combat Aviation Brigade is a Combat Aviation Brigade of the United States Army's 25th Infantry Division based at Wheeler Army Airfield.

== Structure ==
- 2nd Battalion, 25th Aviation Regiment, (UH-60M) "Diamondhead"
- 3rd Battalion (General Support), 25th Aviation Regiment "Hammerhead"
- 2nd Squadron, 6th Cavalry Regiment "Lightning Horse"
- 209th Aviation Support Battalion "Lobos"
