= 25th Aviation Regiment =

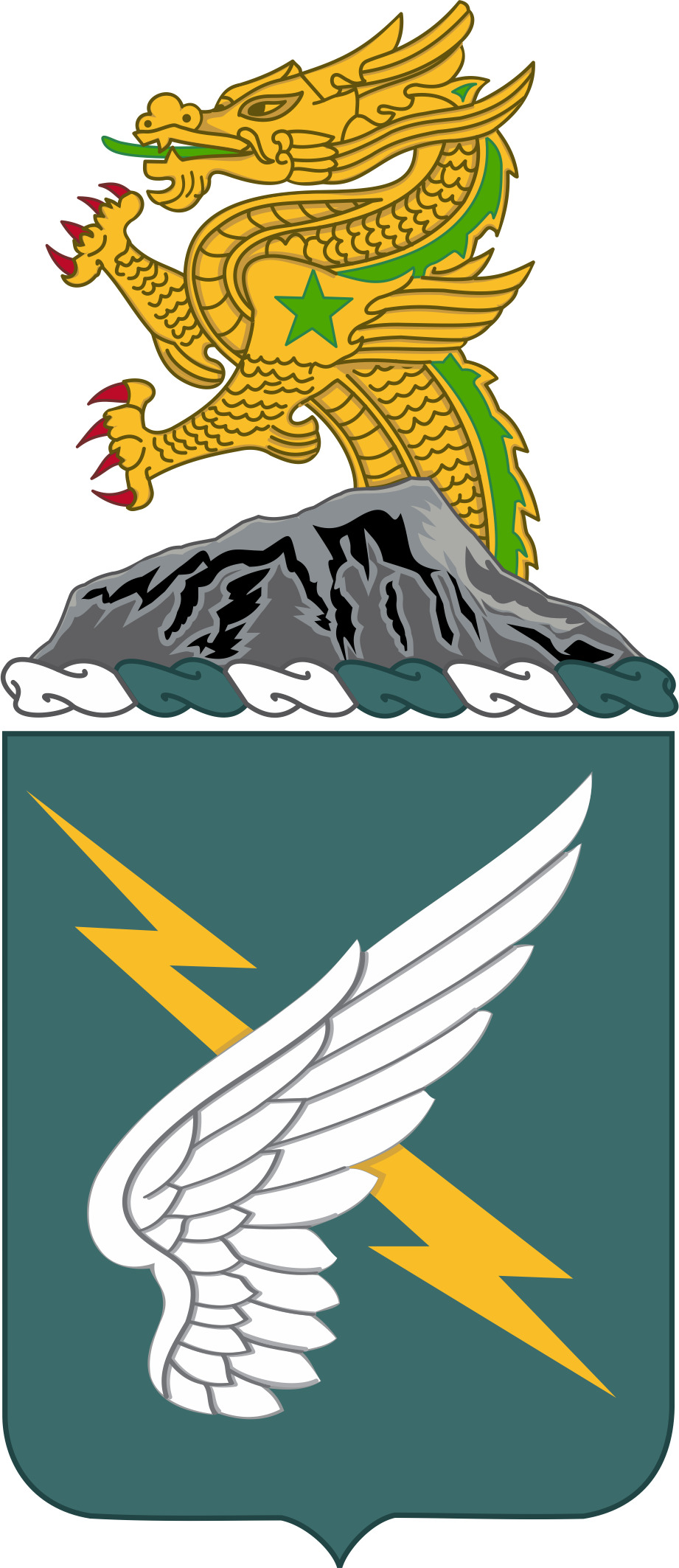
- Coat of arms
- Active: 1957
- Country: United States
- Branch: Army
- Type: Aviation
- Motto: Lele Makou No Na Puali (We Fly For The Troops)

Insignia
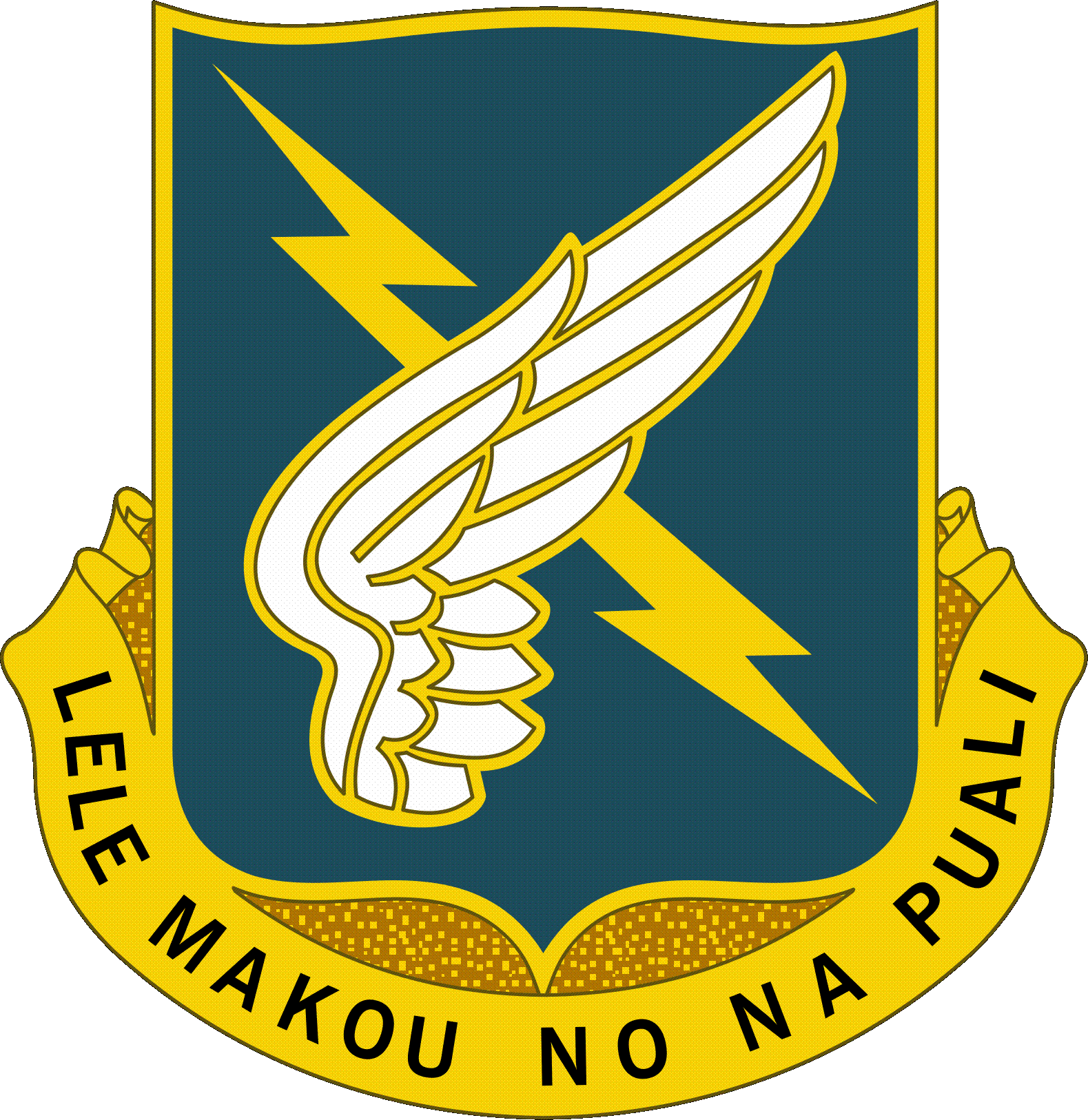
- Distinctive unit insignia

Aircraft flown
- Attack helicopter: AH-64D Apache
- Cargo helicopter: CH-47F Chinook
- Utility helicopter: UH-60L/M Black Hawk

The 25th Aviation Regiment is an aviation regiment of the U.S. Army.

== Structure ==
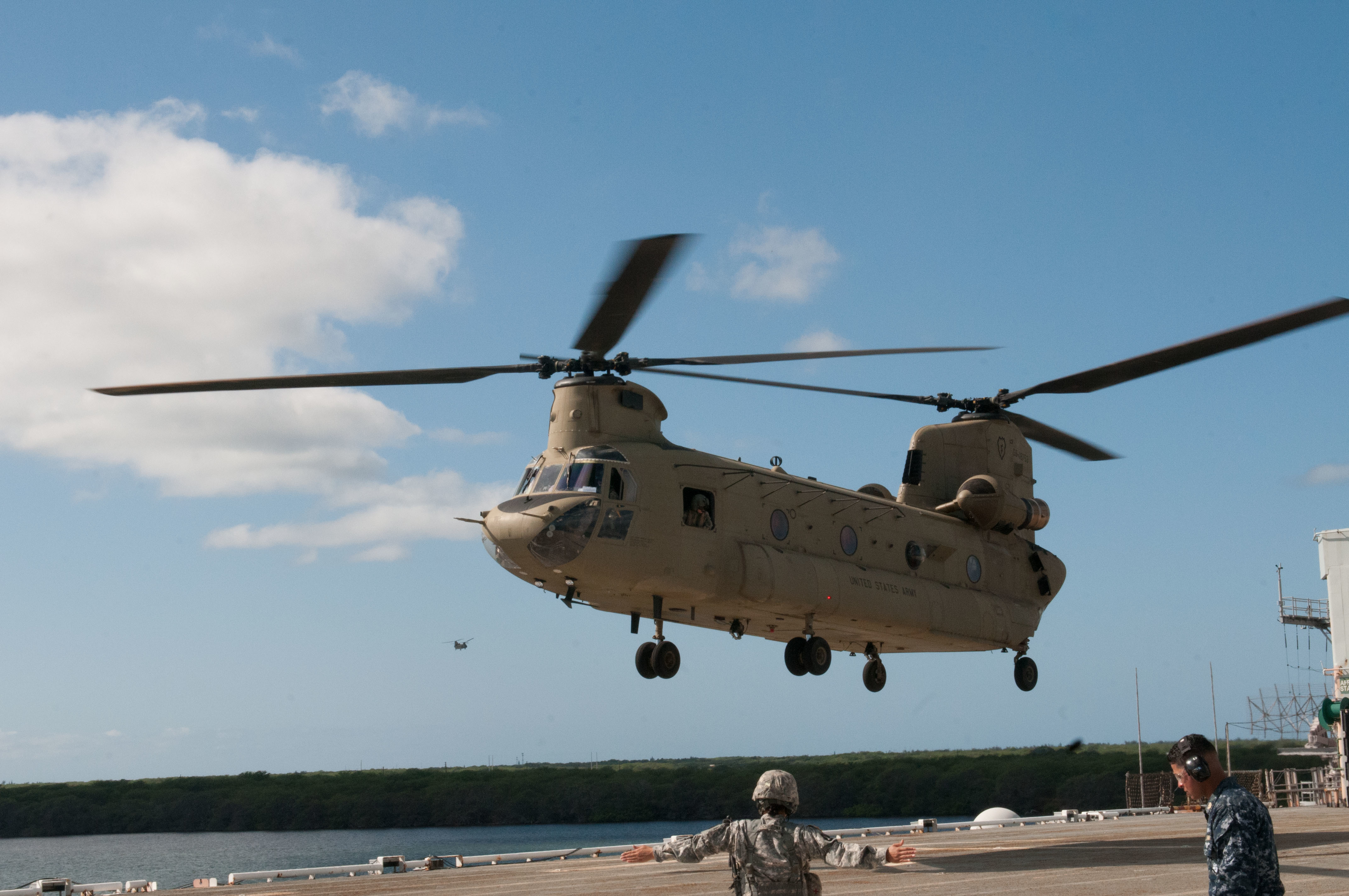
CH-47 Chinook helicopter landing on the deck of the then-USS Tarawa

- 1st Battalion (Attack Reconnaissance)
  - Company A (AH-64E)
  - Company B (AH-64E)
  - Company C (AH-64E)
  - Company D "Thunderbirds"(MQ-1C)
- 2nd Battalion "Diamondhead" (Assault)
  - Headquarters and Headquarters Company (HHC)
  - Company A "Blackjacks"(UH-60M)
  - Company B "Knighthawks"(UH-60M)
  - Company C "Wolfpack" (UH-60M)
  - Company D "Cannibals"
  - Company E "Road Runner"
- 3rd Battalion "Hammerheads" (General Support)
  - HHC "Marlins"
  - Company A "Stingrays"(UH-60M)
  - Company B "Hillclimbers"(CH-47F)
  - Company C "Dustoff"(HH-60M)
  - Company D "Tiger sharks"
  - Company E
  - Company F "Cobras" (Air Traffic Control)

== Lineage ==
Constituted 1 February 1957 in the Regular Army as the 25th Aviation Company, assigned to the 25th Infantry Division, and activated at Schofield Barracks, Hawaii

Reorganized and redesignated 12 August 1963 as Headquarters and Headquarters Company, 25th Aviation Battalion (organic elements constituted 21 June 1963 and activated 12 August 1963).

Between 1966 and 1967 the 341st Airfield Operations Detachment was attached.

Inactivated 15 October 1985 at Schofield Barracks, Hawaii.

Activated 16 January 1986 at Wheeler Air Force Base, Hawaii

Relieved 16 May 1988 from assignment to the 25th Infantry Division; concurrently reorganized and redesignated as the 25th Aviation, a parent regiment under the United States Army Regimental System.

On 15 May 1991, five UH-60 helicopters from 4th Battalion, 25th Aviation Regiment were deployed to Chittagong in Operation Sea Angel, the United States humanitarian response to the 1991 Bangladesh cyclone. 4-25 Aviation Regiment was a major unit in the mission, distributing 891.5 tons of humanitarian supplies and 107.5 tons of military equipment, and flying about half of the total tonnage flown by all helicopters in the mission.

It may at its maximum size have had up to four battalions.

== Campaign participation credit ==
Counteroffensive; Counteroffensive, Phase II; Counteroffensive, Phase III; Tet Counteroffensive; Counteroffensive, Phase IV; Counteroffensive, Phase V; Counteroffensive, Phase VI; Tet 69/Counteroffensive; Summer-Fall 1969; Winter-Spring 1970; Sanctuary Counteroffensive; Counteroffensive, Phase VII

== Decorations ==
- Valorous Unit Award for HO BO WOODS
- Valorous Unit Award for TAY NINH – HAU NGHIA
- Valorous Unit Award for SOMALIA
- Meritorious Unit Commendation (Army) for VIETNAM 1966–1967
- Meritorious Unit Commendation (Army) for VIETNAM 1968
- Republic of Vietnam Cross of Gallantry with Palm for VIETNAM 1966–1968
- Republic of Vietnam Cross of Gallantry with Palm for VIETNAM 1968–1970
- Republic of Vietnam Civil Action Honor Medal for VIETNAM 1966–1970

== See also ==
- List of United States Army aircraft battalions
- U.S. Army Regimental System
- United States Army Aviation Branch
