= Gray Army Airfield =

Military airfield located within the Fort Lewis entity of Joint Base Lewis-McChord

- Part of Fort Lewis
- Near Lakewood, Washington in the United States
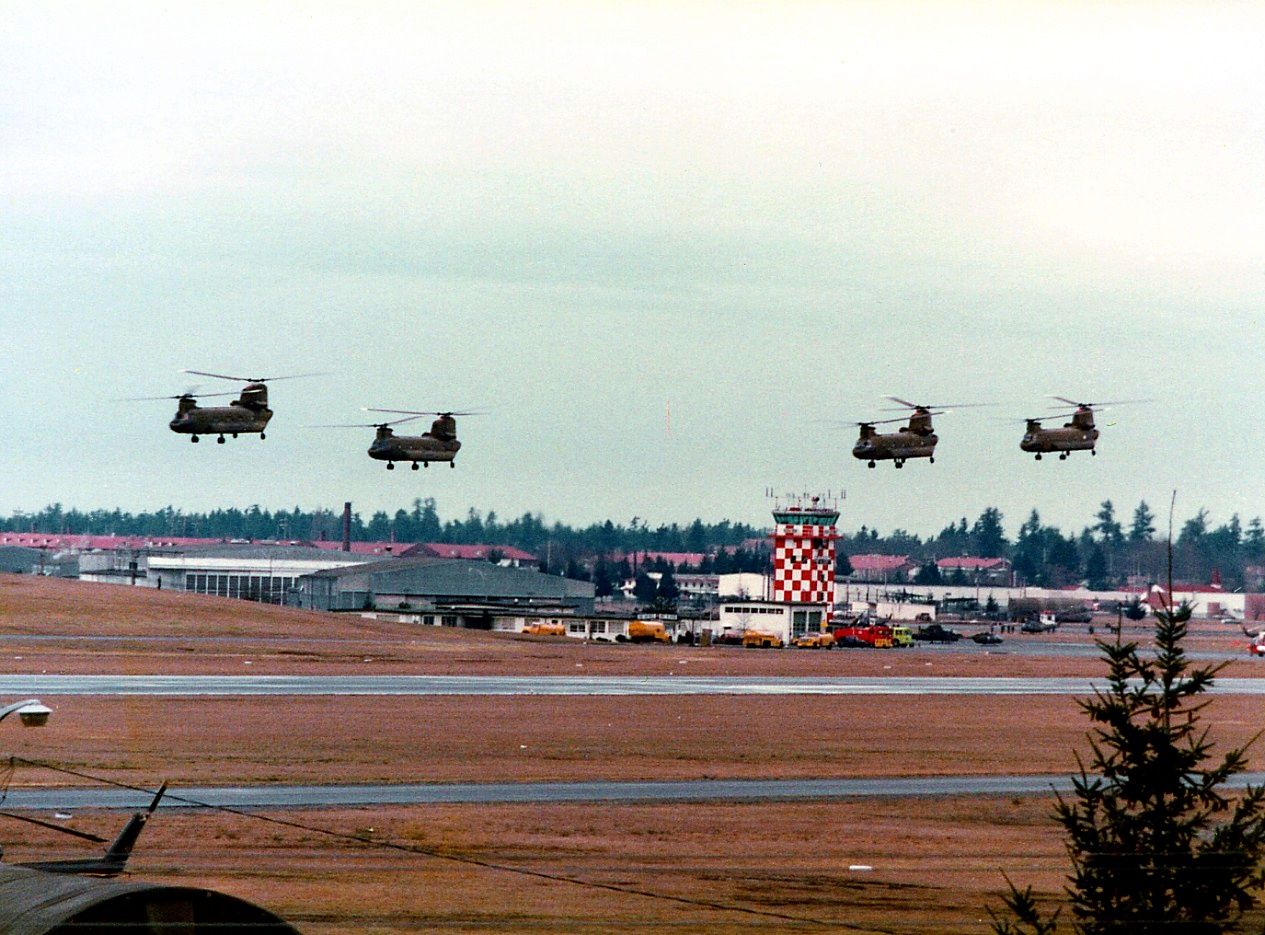
- Chinook helicopters over Gray Army Airfield in 1977

Site information
- Type: Army Airfield
- Owner: Department of Defense
- Operator: US Army
- Controlled by: US Army Installation Management Command (IMCOM)
- Condition: Operational

Location
- Location in the United States
- Coordinates: 47°04′45″N 122°34′51″W

Site history
- Built: 1921
- In use: 1921 – present

Airfield information
- Identifiers: IATA: GRF, ICAO: KGRF, FAA LID: GRF, WMO: 742070
- Elevation: 91.44 metres (300 ft) AMSL
Runways
Direction	Length and surface
15/33	1,866.9 metres (6,125 ft) Asphalt

Gray Army Airfield (IATA: GRF, ICAO: KGRF, FAA LID: GRF), also known as Gray AAF, is a military airfield located within the Fort Lewis entity of Joint Base Lewis–McChord near Tacoma, in Pierce County, Washington, United States.

== Overview ==
Used to support Fort Lewis, Army helicopters assisted with medical evacuations at Mount Rainier National Park on numerous occasions in the 1970s. Army helicopters were also used to insert search-and-rescue [SAR] teams into inaccessible areas on the east, north, and west sides of the mountain, lowering rangers to the ground by a cable device known as a "jungle penetrator." Helicopters began assisting with high altitude (above 10,000 feet) SAR operations in the 1980s. Helicopters were also used for "short haul" rescue operations, in which a ranger and litter were carried in a sling below the helicopter to the scene of the accident.

- Elements of 1st Attack Reconnaissance Battalion, 229th Aviation Regiment (AH-64E)

The Washington Army National Guard 66th Theater Aviation Command trains at Grey AAF and provides transportation support for fighting wildfires.

== History ==
The field is named in honor of Captain Hawthorne C. Gray, who died during a free balloon flight starting from Scott Field, Belleville, Illinois, on November 4, 1927. Captain Gray (1889–1927) served as a private in World War I and after the war attended balloon and flying schools, receiving a commission. He then joined the Army Air Service and the Airship School where he made test flights. Captain Gray became a pioneer in stratospheric flight, setting a U.S. altitude record of 29,000 feet on his first flight. He reached higher heights, including 42,000 feet on the fatal November flight on which he died of oxygen deprivation.

=== Origins ===
In October 1921 Curtiss JN-4 "Jenny" biplanes flew from the Naval Station at Sand Point (Seattle) to a grass airfield at what was then called "Camp Lewis", located at a site just west of today's Gray AAF. In 1922 the primitive field moved forward with the erection of a steel hangar, Hangar Number 1. The Camp Lewis field found itself in competition with Navy aviation at Sand Point, as both sought to be the region's primary military airfield.

Camp Lewis advocates pushed for it to be a major dirigible and fixed-wing field. Progress in that direction occurred in 1923 with the erection of a Mooring Mast. This mast, located in the northern portion of the camp, would serve to dock arriving dirigibles. The USS Shenandoah (ZR-1) tied up here on May 17, 1924, as a crowd of 15,000 watched. Shenandoah made a second visit on October 18, 1924, tying up during the evening, following delays waiting for the fog to lift. At noon the next day the navy dirigible departed for San Diego, where it arrived 40 hours later. The USS Shenandoah was the only dirigible to visit Camp Lewis. Weather conditions, with fog and cloud cover issues, favored other landing sites.

In 1926, the War Department observing aviation expansion overseas requested additional aviation funding. Congress provided monies for a five-year plan to bring the army air services to 2,200 fighters and to increase the number of aircrews. Camp Lewis received funding in 1927 to build a second hangar. Also, on September 13 that year the famous aviator Charles Lindbergh made a low level pass over the maneuver and training field (today Watkins Parade Ground) simulating an attack. This demonstration of air power encouraged the use of airplanes in infantry support. The new airfield construction was part of the larger permanent construction that gave the camp permanence and a new designation of Fort Lewis.

The Fort Lewis airfield housed observation planes. A communications building and photography building were completed in 1933. In October 1933 the 86th Observation Squadron arrived with three planes. The 91st Observation Squadron replaced the 86th in June 1936 as a seven-plane squadron. A photography section was also added at this time. The major expansion came in April 1938 with a Public Works Administration project to construct new runways and buildings.

The 1938 construction included two paved runways (a main runway at 6,175 feet in length and east–west at 2,300 feet in length), a boiler plant, headquarters building, metal balloon hangar, six-plane hangar, corrugated-iron hangar, storehouse, flight-surgeon office, and film-storage building. The metal balloon hangar had served at Fort Casey, Washington, since May 1921. Workers disassembled the hangar, placed it on a truck, and drove to Fort Lewis where the same workers reassembled the structure.

=== World War II ===
The 91st Observation Squadron and aircraft of the 3rd Balloon Squadron operated out of the Fort Lewis airfield. They trained in observing enemy positions and supporting the division. The Fort Lewis field was renamed Gray Army Airfield on April 12, 1938. During 1940, the 91st Observation Squadron departed and the 116th Observation Squadron flying 0-47 observation aircraft moved in. The 116th was a Washington National Guard unit activated in 1940.

With World War II, Gray Army Airfield received 1.7 million dollars for new hangars and improved facilities. As the war approached Gray AAF units trained with ground forces. The GAAF 116th Observation and 116th Photo Squadrons had six observation planes, O-47 and O-49s. The 116th flew anti-submarine patrols. Joining in the antisubmarine patrols was the 123d Observation Squadron activated from the Oregon National Guard. It was equipped with BC-1 and O-46 observation aircraft.

World War II cantonment construction involved the demolition of some of the pre-1941 buildings. A number of the GAAF shop and support buildings were demolished to make room for temporary wood-frame barracks on what had been the field's southwest corner. Two of the early hangars and support buildings along the main runway remained in use. One new hangar, today Building 3063, was completed in 1942. This is the only surviving building from World War II and the oldest structure at the airfield. A new concrete apron was added around the World War II hangar. During World War II, the control tower sat on the west side of the field; today an improved tower stands on the east side.

The Air Transport Command. 4131st Army Air Force Base Unit used GAAF as the CONUS hub for the Alsskan West Coast Wing, ferrying supplies, equipment and aircraft to Eleventh Air Force at Elmendorf Field, near Fairbanks. Also used by Air Technical Service Command as an aircraft maintenance and supply depot; primarily to service aircraft being sent to Alaska

=== Postwar era ===
The Army Air Force closed its facilities in 1947. Jurisdiction transferred to Department of the Army for observation and Liaison aircraft at Fort Lewis. Following the war Gray Army Airfield housed the 2d Infantry Division aviation assets, observation planes, and support aircraft. The 2d Infantry Division served at Fort Lewis until the Korean War. During the interwar years GAAF activities were limited. The GAAF planes participated in maneuvers and training.

=== Cold War ===
During the Korean War, GAAF continued in the role as a training and division support field. On the field could be seen L-19 Bird Dog and other observation planes. The L-19 proved to be easy to fly and reliable, with more than 3,000 produced. Pilots trained in L-19s for Forward Air Controller (FAC) roles—directing artillery fire and infantry movement. The 2d Infantry Division began testing helicopters in early 1949 and had nine here. On November 22, 1950, the 2d Aviation Company introduced helicopters, H-13 Sioux's, into the Korean War. Attached to the 8055th Mobile Army Surgical Hospital (MASH), the helicopters transported wounded.

After the Korean War, the 2d Aviation Company, of the 2d Infantry Division, which had been the first helicopter unit in Korea, returned to Fort Lewis with observation/spotter aircraft L-19 Bird Dogs, and L-20 Beavers, as well as H-23 Raven helicopters. Again GAAF served division aviation assets. The 4th Infantry Division came to Fort Lewis in 1956 with its aviation unit.

During the Vietnam War, GAAF not only trained helicopter units, but fixed-wing aircraft units as well. One fixed-wing unit, the 244th Aviation Company (aerial surveillance) activated here on September 15, 1966. The 244th flew OV-1 Mohawk aircraft with the mission of "finding the enemy."

Reactivated following service in Vietnam, the 9th Infantry Division aviation units occupied GAAF in 1972. The division itself held a day-long reactivation ceremony at the field on May 26, 1972. Army Chief of Staff, General William Westmoreland (1914–2005) attended the ceremony. The event included fly by's, tactical air strike exhibits, helicopters demonstrating air assault, and soldiers rappelling from helicopters.

The 9th Cavalry Brigade (Air Assault) in the 1980s developed air-assault strategies with their AH-1 Cobra helicopters based upon experiences learned in Vietnam. They were equipped with rockets, guns, and grenade launchers for close fire support. A post-Vietnam air-supported infantry dominated GAAF operations. This required new supporting facilities, including maintenance hangars and other facilities. In February 1981 a new operations center opened. Three hangars were constructed between 1985 and 1988.

August 1984 saw GAAF become one of few test centers for the UH-60 Blackhawk helicopters. The Blackhawks were ferried across the United States from their Connecticut factory. The initial group of 14 made the cross-country trek, which took one week, with 28 hours of flying time.

=== Modern era ===
During the 1990s, three aviation units served at GAAF: C Company 214th Aviation Regiment (15 CH-47s), 54th Medical Detachment (seven HU-1VHs), and the Fort Lewis Flight Detachment (two C-12s, four Uh-1Hs). These units flew a total of 5,000 to 7,000 hours per year. The 54th Medical Detachment flew real medical evacuation flights as well as training. The combat units also assisted in fire fighting, local disaster relief, and other assistance missions.

Another innovative aircraft came to GAAF in the fall of 2000. D-Troop, the 14th Cavalry Battalion, introduced UAV (Unmanned Aerial Vehicle) flights. The cavalry soldiers learned how to fly the UAV and learned its reconnaissance and attack potential. In the War on Terrorism the UAV has become a critical and effective tool.

GAAF units have served in Iraq with Company A, 5th Battalion, 159th Aviation Regiment, returning from a 15-month deployment on April 17, 2004. Serving in Balad, Iraq, the company with their CH-47 Chinooks performed transportation and supply missions. The 4th Squadron, 6th Cavalry, with UH-60 Blackhawks, recently supported infantry units in Iraq. Chief Warrant Officer Scott Oswell of the 4th was killed in a crash of his OH-58 Kiowa observation helicopter in Iraq on July 4, 2007. The next month one of the unit's UH-60 Blackhawk crashed, killing its crew. The 4th Squadron has returned to GAAF and has resumed training for future actions.

Since 2005 the field has been experiencing another major expansion. This includes the activation of a Special Operations Aviation Battalion on July 16, 2006. The battalion is equipped with MH-47 Chinook's and MH-60 Black Hawk helicopters. A new complex has been constructed for the Special Operations forces.

F Company 2nd Battalion, 135th General Support Aviation Battalion (formerly A Company, 5th Battalion, 159th Aviation Regiment (1996–2008) & B Company 1st Battalion, 214th General Support Aviation Battalion (2008–2016)), conducts high-altitude search-and-rescue operations. Based at Joint Base Lewis-McChord's Gray Army Airfield, the Army Reserve aviation unit transports National Park Service emergency search-and-rescue teams to and from the mountain. The company inherited the SAR mission in July 1998, when the active-Army unit tasked with the responsibility was inactivated. During regular training sessions before and during the climbing season, the unit's CH-47 Chinook helicopters fly to Kautz Creek near the base of the mountain to pick up the SAR teams. Then the combined group performs insertion and extraction drills at locations from roughly 10,000 feet to the summit at 14,410 feet above sea level. SAR missions are varied. F Company participated in a search for a missing snowboarder on the southeast side of the mountain. Hampered by foul weather and heavy cloud cover, the mission extended into several days as Chinook pilots and crew-members transported SAR teams and flew search patterns, working routes, crevasses and tree lines where the snow-boarder might be. The victim never was found. Another mission involved two climbers who lost vital equipment during a climb on the Liberty Ridge ice face, at 13,000 feet. They requested help by cell phone, but the first Chinook sortie was turned away by an intense squall line, requiring additional flights to drop off and later pick up rescue teams.

== Facilities ==
FAA diagram

Gray Army Airfield resides at elevation of 300 feet (91 m) above mean sea level. It has one runway designated 15/33 with an asphalt surface measuring 6,125 by 150 feet (1,867 x 46 m).

== Units ==
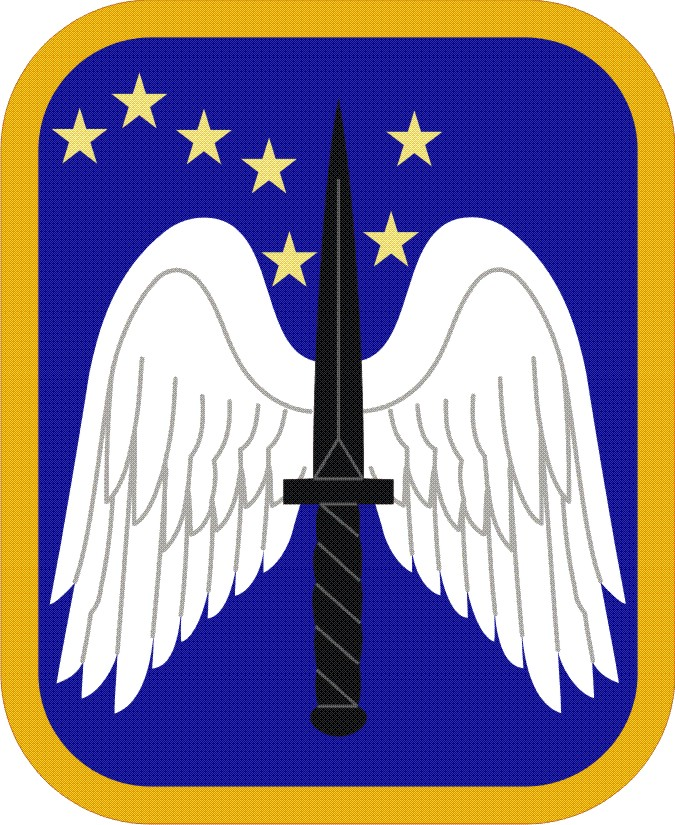
- 16th Combat Aviation Brigade
  - Headquarters and Headquarters Company (HHC)
  - 1st Battalion (Attack), 229th Aviation Regiment, (AH-64E Apache)
  - 2nd Battalion (Assault), 158th Aviation Regiment, (UH-60 Black Hawk)
  - 4th Squadron (Air Cavalry), 6th Cavalry Regiment, (AH-64E Apache) & (RQ-7 Shadow)
  - 46th Aviation Support Battalion
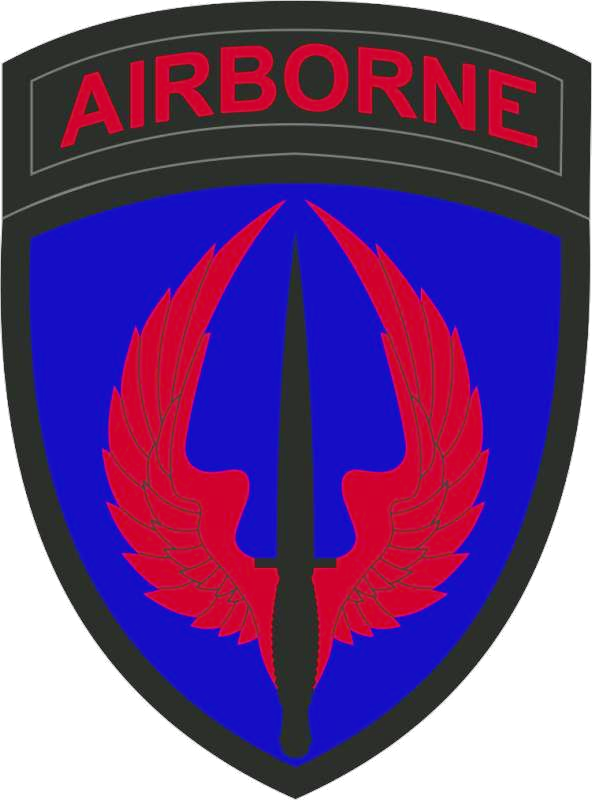
- U.S. Army Special Operations Aviation Command
  - 4th Battalion, 160th Special Operations Aviation Regiment (Airborne)
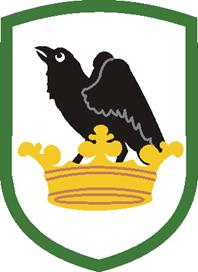
- Washington Army National Guard
  - 1-168th General Support Aviation Battalion (GSAB), (UH-60 Black Hawk) & (CH-47 Chinook)

== See also ==
- Washington World War II Army Airfields
