= 52nd Aviation Regiment (United States) =

52nd Aviation Battalion
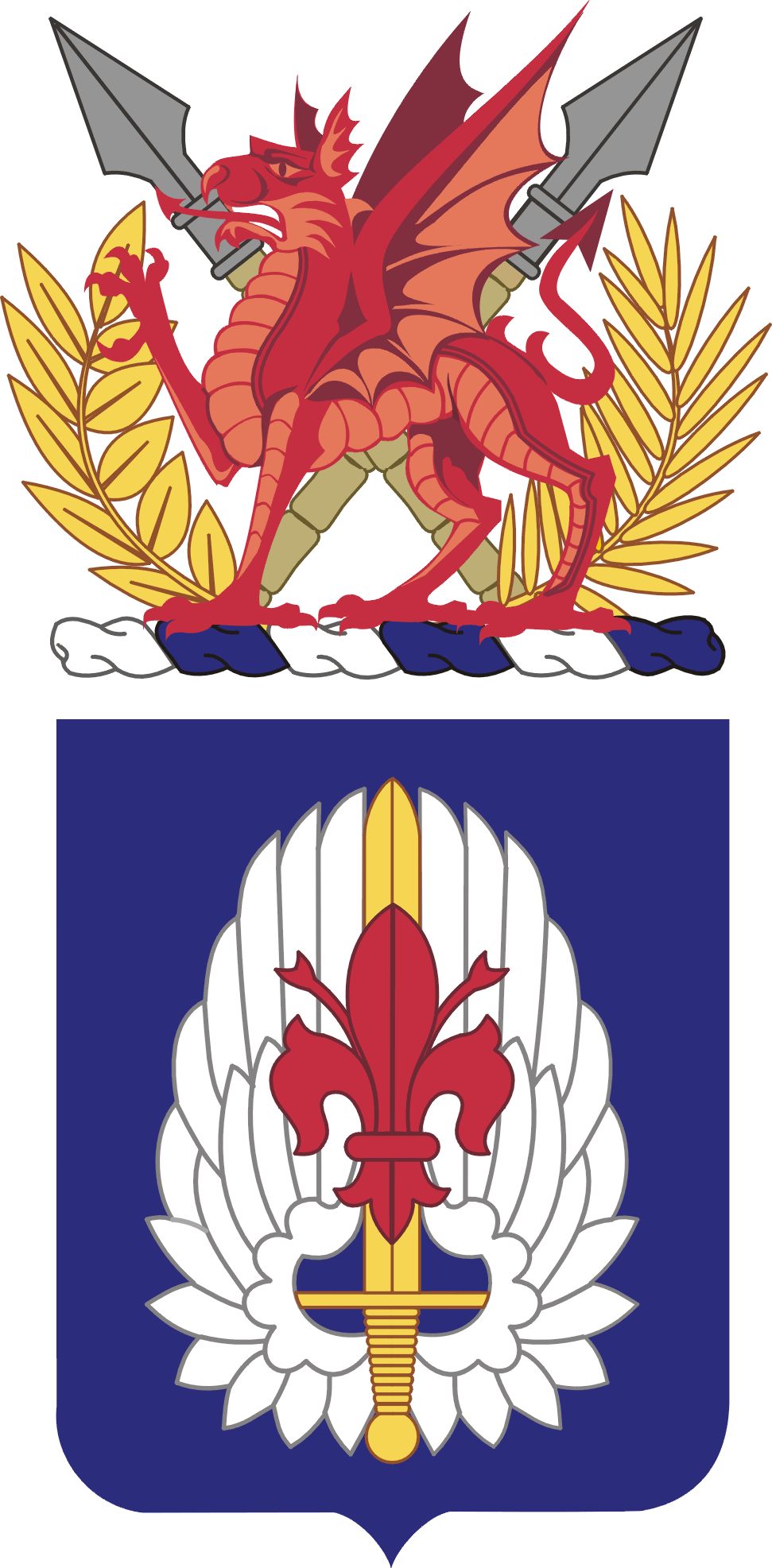
- coat of arms
- Active: 1940-present
- Country: United States
- Branch: United States Army
- Type: Aviation
- Part of: United States Army Aviation Branch
- Garrison/HQ: Joint Forces Training Base – Los Alamitos
- Motto: FORGED IN FIRE
- Colors: Ultramarine Blue, Golden orange

Insignia
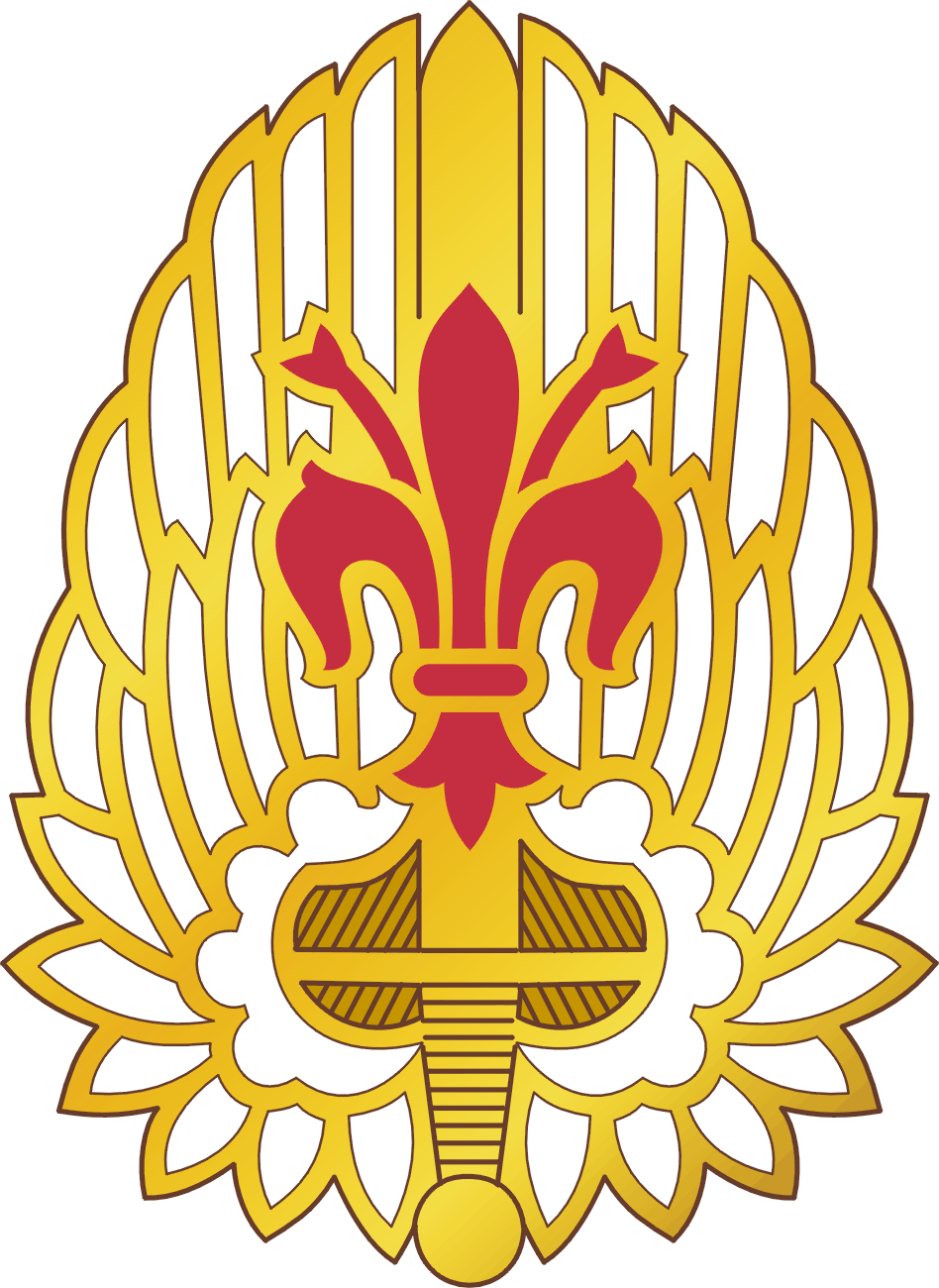
- Distinctive Unit Insignia

Aircraft flown
- Helicopter: UH-60M W/ MEDEVAC UH-60L CH-47
- Transport: C-12 and UC-35

The 52nd Aviation Regiment is an aviation regiment of the United States Army.

== History ==
During 1966 the 52nd Combat Aviation Battalion, 1st Aviation Group included:

- Command and Control Group, Headquarters and Headquarters Detachment
- 155th Aviation Company
- 161st Aviation Company
- 170th Aviation Company
- Detachment, 219th Aviation Company
- Detachment, 498th Medical Company (Air Ambulance)
- Detachment, Company C, 228th Aviation Battalion
- Helicopters from the 1st Cavalry Division
- 119th Assault Helicopter Company

In 1968 the 52nd Combat Aviation Battalion was commanded by LTC. Chamberlain.

In 1969 The 52nd Combat Aviation Battalion was commanded by LTC. Patrick John O'Grady.

This report for the period 1 May through 31 July 1969 is submitted in compliance with AR 525-15 USARPAC Reg 525-15, US.JIV Reg 525-15 and 17th Aviation Group (Combat) Reg 525-15. (1) Headquarters, 52nd Aviation Battalion (Combat), LTC Patrick J. O'Grady, Commanding, remains at Camp Holloway, Fleiku, RVN, Inclosure 1 reflects organizational structure and battaIion list of all assigned, attached, and OFCCN units, with location and AFO, as of 31 July/1969.

== Lineage ==
- Constituted 31 May 1940 in the Regular Army as Headquarters and Headquarters Detachment, 204th Quartermaster Battalion
- Activated 10 June 1942 at Compton, California
- Redesignated 1 July 1942 as Headquarters and Headquarters Detachment, 204th Quartermaster Gas Supply Battalion
- Reorganized and redesignated 10 December 1943 as Headquarters and Headquarters Detachment, 204th Quartermaster Battalion, Mobile
- Inactivated 13 October 1945 at Camp Kilmer, New Jersey
- Converted and redesignated 1 August 1946 as Headquarters and Headquarters Detachment, 204th Transportation Corps Truck Battalion; concurrently activated at Fort Benning, Georgia
- Redesignated 20 May 1947 as Headquarters and Headquarters Detachment, 204th Transportation Truck Battalion
- Reorganized and redesignated 16 May 1949 as Headquarters and Headquarters Company, 52d Transportation Truck Battalion
- Reorganized and redesignated 1 April 1954 as Headquarters and Headquarters Company, 52d Transportation Battalion
- Inactivated 10 May 1955 in Japan
- Redesignated 13 October 1955 as Headquarters and Headquarters Detachment, 52d Transportation Battalion
- Activated 7 November 1955 at Fort Bragg, North Carolina
- Converted and redesignated 22 December 1962 as Headquarters and Headquarters Company, 52d Aviation Battalion
- Reorganized and redesignated 25 January 1965 as Headquarters and Headquarters Detachment, 52d Aviation Battalion
- Reorganized and redesignated 25 November 1968 as Headquarters and Headquarters Company, 52d Aviation Battalion
- Reorganized and redesignated 21 June 1979 as Headquarters and Headquarters Detachment, 52d Aviation Battalion
- Reorganized and redesignated 16 October 1987 as Headquarters and Headquarters Company, 52d Aviation Battalion
- Inactivated 16 October 1988 in Korea
- Redesignated 16 January 1996 as the 52d Aviation, a parent regiment under the United States Army Regimental System
- Redesignated 1 October 2005 as the 52d Aviation Regiment

== Distinctive unit insignia ==
- Description

A gold color metal and enamel device 1 1/8 inches (2.9 cm) in height overall consisting of a pair of white wings pointing upward in the center of which, between the two leading edges, is a gold color sword also point up. Placed in the center of the sword blade is a red Florentine fleur-de-lis.

- Symbolism

The white wings represent the unit's capacity as an Aviation organization. The sword is a symbol of the Army and symbolizes the unit's combat power during World War II and the Korean War. The red fleur-de-lis of Florence alludes to World War II service in Italy.

- Background

The distinctive unit insignia was originally approved for the 52d Aviation Battalion on 22 June 1966. It was redesignated effective 16 September 1996, for the 52d Aviation Regiment.

== Coat of arms ==
=== Blazon ===
- Shield

Azure, a vol Argent surmounted by a sword Or, overall a Florentine fleur-de-lis Gules.

- Crest

From a wreath Argent and Azure two demi-spears with bamboo shafts saltirewise Proper between an arced branch of laurel and one of palm Or, overall a dragon passant Gules. Motto FLYING DRAGONS.

- Symbolism
- Shield

Blue is the primary color for Aviation. The wings are symbolic of the unit's mission. The sword represents the unit's service in World War II and the Korean War. The red fleur-de-lis of Florence represents service in Italy during World War II.

- Crest

The dragon highlights the unit's motto and commemorates its campaign participation credits earned during World War II; red symbolizes courage and sacrifice. The bamboo spears commemorate Korean War and Vietnam service. The unit's decorations are symbolized by laurel for honor and high achievement and palm for victory.

- Background

The coat of arms was originally approved for the 52d Aviation Regiment on 7 February 1996. It was amended to include a crest on 16 April 1996.

== Current configuration ==
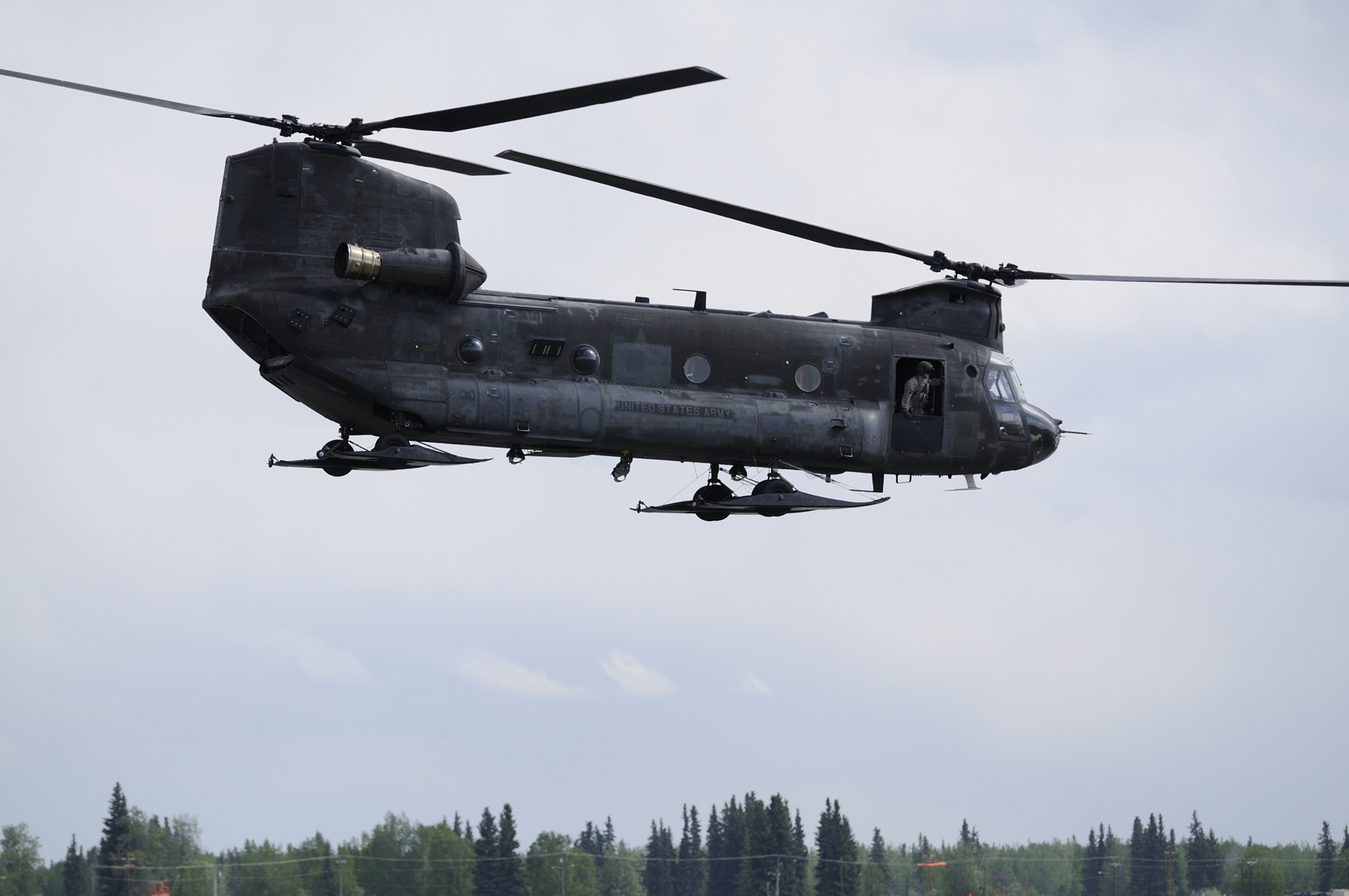
CH-47 Chinook helicopter, assigned to B Company, 1st Battalion, 52nd Aviation Regiment, lands at Fort Wainwright's Hangar 1

- 1st General Support Aviation Battalion (Arctic Dragons)
  - Headquarters and Headquarters Company (Wolverines)
  - Alpha Company (Tomahawks) – Iraq Mar 2009 – Dec 2009
  - Bravo Company (Sugar Bears) – Afghanistan Jun 2011 – Feb 2012
  - Charlie Company (Arctic DUSTOFF) (UH-60) – Afghanistan Feb 2011 – Feb 2012
  - Delta Company (Old Dukes)
  - Echo Company (Eagle Support)
  - Fox Company (Arctic Owls) – Afghanistan Mar 2014 – Nov 2014
- 2nd Battalion (Constituted in the Regular Army 16 January 1996 as the 2nd Battalion, 52nd Aviation, and activated in the Republic of Korea)
- 6th Battalion (Constituted in the Army Reserve on 16 October 1995 as the 6th Battalion (less Company A), 52nd Aviation, Activated (less Company A) on 16 September 1996 with its headquarters at Joint Forces Training Base – Los Alamitos, California) (Flying Dragons)
  - Headquarters and Headquarters Company JFTB Los Alamitos, California
  - Alpha Company: C-12U and UC-35A Located at NAS Fort Worth JRB, TX
  - Bravo Company: C-12V and UC-35A Located at JFTB Los Alamitos, CA
  - Charlie Company: C-12V Located at Fort Knox, KY

== See also ==
- List of United States Army aircraft battalions
- U.S. Army Regimental System
- United States Army Aviation Branch
