= 119th Assault Helicopter Company =

17th Combat Aviation Group

- Active: September 1962 – November 1970
- Disbanded: November 1970
- Country: United States
- Branch: United States Army
- Role: Helicopter assault
- Size: Company
- Nickname(s): Alligator slicks & Crocodile guns
- Engagements: Vietnam War

Aircraft flown
- Helicopter: Bell UH-1C; Bell UH-1D; Bell UH-1H

During the Vietnam War, one unit assigned to the 52nd Combat Aviation Battalion, 17th Combat Aviation Group, 1st Aviation Brigade was the 119th Assault Helicopter Company. The company operated throughout the Central Highlands of Vietnam during the war, from arrival in September 1962 until deactivation in November 1970. Originally designated the 81st Transportation Company (equipped with twin-rotor CH-21 "Flying Banana" piston-engined helicopters), the company was reorganized in 1963 as the 119th Assault Helicopter Company (Airmobile), re-equipped with turbine-powered single-rotor UH-1A and B model Hueys. Also known as the 119th Aviation Company (Assault Helicopter), the company's area of operations included the entire Central Highlands of Vietnam, plus large portions of Laos and Cambodia.

Eventually assigned to the 52nd Combat Aviation Battalion, 17th Combat Aviation Group, 1st Aviation Brigade and headquartered at Camp Holloway in Pleiku, the company was also based at Camp Radcliff for a short time from late in 1969 to 1970. The unit was attacked twice by People's Army of Vietnam sappers while at Camp Radcliff, once in each year. The Company was equipped with 16 to 20 lightly armed UH-1D "slick" troopships, and approximately 8 Huey UH-1C model gunships. Due to high density-altitudes in the unit’s Central Highlands area of operations, by 1969 all UH-1Ds were upgraded to the more-powerful UH-1H aircraft. The "slick" troopships used the radio callsign "Alligator" or "Gator", the gunships used the callsign "Crocodiles" or "Crocs". The callsigns that the pilots used were atypical for US Army aviation units of the time, instead of standard callsigns such as "Blue four-one" or "Yellow six," the pilots used nicknames. The company at one time also used the callsign called "Black Dragon," from which the 52nd CABn "Flying Dragon" callsign evolved. The total company strength of approximately 225 included 50 to 60 pilots and an equal number of crewmembers, plus field maintenance and other critical support personnel.

During over eight years in Vietnam, the 119th Assault Helicopter Company provided helicopter support for the US Army 4th Infantry Division, 25th Infantry Division, 1st Cavalry Division, 173d Airborne Brigade, US Marine Corps, United States Army Special Forces and the Army of the Republic of Vietnam. They also flew many classified missions for MACV-SOG. Over 60 members of the 119th Assault Helicopter Company were killed in action, with many more wounded.
