= List of United States military installations in Iraq =

Map of major U.S. military bases in Iraq and the number of soldiers stationed there (2007)

The United States Department of Defense formerly had a number of military bases in Iraq, most of them a type of forward operating base (FOB). The US and Iraq agreed in 2024 that the US would withdraw remaining troops by 2026. This was completed on September 30, 2026.

== History ==
Depending on their size or utility, the installations were called: camp, forward operating bases (FOBs), contingency operating bases (COBs), contingency operating sites (COSs), combat outposts (COPs), patrol base (PBs), logistic bases (log bases), fire bases (FBs), convoy support centers (CSCs), logistic support areas (LSAs), and joint security stations (JSSs). Near the end of Occupation of Iraq (2003–2011), the last several camps and forward operating bases were changed to contingency operating bases and sites.

At the height of the occupation, the US had 170,000 personnel in uniform stationed in 505 bases throughout all provinces of Iraq. Another 135,000 private military contractors were also working in Iraq.

Due to International military intervention against ISIL, personnel returned to old bases and new bases were created. Control of many U.S.-operated bases was transferred to the Iraqi government during the 2020–2021 U.S. troop withdrawal.

At the request of the Iraqi government in January 2024, the US and Iraq began negotiations to end the US military presence in Iraq. The withdrawal began in September 2024, continued in September 2025, and was completed by September 2026.

== Airfields ==
Name	District	Governorate	Opened	Closed	Fate	Notes
Al-Harir Air Base	Shaqlawa	Erbil (Kurdistan Region)	2003	2026	Transferred to Iraqi Army	
Al-Asad Airbase	Haditha and Hīt	Al Anbar	2003	2026	Transferred to Iraqi Army	

== Camps ==
Type	Name	District	Governorate	Opened	Closed	Fate	Notes
Camp	Al-Khalis (Rock City FOB)	Al-Khalis	Diyala				?
Camp	Al Qa'im (Al Qa'im train station)	Al-Qa'im	Al Anbar				?
Camp	Al Watani (Green Zone)		Baghdad				?
Camp	Anah; COP Ocotal	Anah	Al Anbar				1/4 TF Highlander in '07 w/1st LAR, 3/4 in '06/'07, and many others over years. Large SVBIED at TCP Alpha 20070507.
Camp	Andaluz (Spanish Camp)	Kufa	Najaf				Used by Spanish troops
Camp	Anderson	Diwaniya	Al-Qādisiyyah				35 miles south of Baghdad
Camp	Camp Apache; Camp Gunner Main	Adhamiya	Baghdad				
Camp	Arkansas	Al Salam	Baghdad				Al Salam Palace
Camp	Arrow	Ad-Dawr/Tikrit	Salah ad Din				
Camp	Avalanche	Abu Ghraib	Baghdad				Abu Ghraib Prison
Camp	Babylon	Hilla	Babil	April 2003	January 2005	Dismantled	HQ of 1st Marine Expeditionary Force; Used by Polish Forces
Camp	Baharia; FOB Volturno	Fallujah	Al Anbar	2003	2009		Dreamland
Camp	Basilone	Nasiriyah	Dhi Qar	March 2003			(Qalat Sikar Air Base)
Camp	Black Jack	Baghdad	Baghdad				Part of the Victory Base Complex
Camp	Boom	Baqubah	Diyala				Baqubah Airfield
Camp	Brassfield Mora	Samarra	Salah ad Din	2004			
Camp	Bravo	Basra	Basra		2011		
Camp	Bristol	Al-Mansour	Baghdad				Part of the Victory Base Complex
Camp	Bucca	Al-Zubair	Basra	2003	December 2010	Hotel	
Camp	Buffalo	Tikrit	Salah ad Din				?
Camp	Bulldog		Baghdad				
Camp	Bushmaster	Al Najaf	Najaf				
Camp	Bushwaker						?
Camp	Buzz	Ar-Rutba	Al Anbar				?
Camp	Clairborne						? Mosul Air Base
Camp	Cobra	Abu Ghraib	Baghdad				Abu Ghraib Presidential Site
Camp	Cold Steel	Khanaqin	Diyala	May 2003			Located 8 miles from Iran border
Camp	Combat Outpost (Ar Ramadi)						?
Camp	Cooke	Taji	Baghdad	2003			Taji Air Base
Camp	Corregidor	Ramadi	Al Anbar	2004			
Camp	Cropper						Part of the Victory Base Complex
Camp	Cuervo; Camp Rustamiyah; Camp Muleskinner	Sadr District	Baghdad	2003	2009	Iraqi Military Academy Rustamiyah	
Camp	Dahuk		Duhok(Kurdistan Region)				
Camp	Daniels (Samarra)		Salah ad Din				
Camp	Dakota (Baghdad)						
Camp	Dracula		Dhi Qar				Used by Romanian troops.
Camp	Dragoon (Baghdad)						
Camp	Duke (Najaf)	Najaf	Najaf	September 2003		All UN sanctioned weapons were destroyed and FOB was transitioned to the Iraqi Ministry of Defense in 2009. Najaf ASP remains active.	Najaf Ammunition Supply Point (ASP)
Camp	Camp Eagle (Baghdad)						
Camp	Eagle III (Najaf)		Najaf				
Camp	Eden; Camp Hit	Al-Qurna	Basra	2003			Used by Danish troops.
Camp	Edson (Diwaniyah)						
Camp	Ellis; Camp Bastard	Barwanah	Al Anbar	2007			
Camp	Endurance; Camp Regulars	Mosul	Nineveh				Q West Air Field
Camp	Fallujah	Fallujah	Al Anbar	March 2004	2009		
Camp	Fenway		Dhi Qar				Qalat Sikar Air Field
Camp	Freedom (Mosul)		Nineveh				
Camp	Freedom I Camp Warhorse		Diyala				Baqubah Air Field
Camp	Freedom II (Green Zone)		Baghdad				
Camp	Ganci (Abu Ghraib)						
Camp	Geiger						
Camp	Gilligan						(Saddam Canal Bridge provisory camp)
Camp	Golf; Camp Baker (Najaf)		Najaf				
Camp	Graceland						Rasheed Air Base
Camp	Griffin						Baghdad International Airport
Camp	Honor	Green Zone/Baghdad	Baghdad		2006	Iraqi Prison	
Camp	Hotel (Najaf)						
Camp	Hurricane Point (Ar Ramadi)		Al Anbar				
Camp	Husaybah	Al-Qa'im	Al Anbar		2009		Renamed Camp Gannon
Camp	Independence; Camp Headhunter; FOB Headhunter	Ali Saleh	Baghdad				Al Muthana Air Base 2 Platoons of HHC 4–64 AR, 4th BDE, 3rd IN Div
Camp	India						
Camp	Iron Horse (Sadr City)						
Camp	Ironhorse; FOB Danger (Tikrit)		Salah ad Din				
Camp	Jennings (Al Amarah)		Maysan				
Camp	Juliet (Karbala)		Karbala				Used by Polish forces
Camp	Junction City (Ar Ramadi)		Al Anbar				
Camp	Justice; Camp Al Adala; Camp Banzai	Kadhamiyah	Baghdad				
Camp	Kalsu		Babylon				
Camp	Klecker		Baghdad				Located in the Baghdad International Airport area
Camp	Knot						
Camp	Korean Village; FOB Buzz (Ar Rutbah / H-3 Air Base )	Ar-Rutba	Al Anbar				
Camp	Lancer	Baiji	Salah ad Din				K-2 Air Base
Camp	Leader (Mosul)						
Camp	Libeccio (Nasiriyah)		Dhi Qar				
Camp	Liberty (Camp Hurriya); Camp Victory North (Camp Al-Tahreer)		Baghdad				Part of the Victory Base Complex
Camp	Lima (Baghdad)						
Camp	Loki	Kurdish Region	Erbil	March 2003	July 2003	Dismantled	Used by Task Force Viking
Camp	Manhattan; Camp Habbaniyah		Al Anbar				Habbaniyah Air Base
Camp	Marez (Mosul)		Nineveh				
Camp	Marlboro (Sadr City)						
Camp	Mejid (Al Asad AB)		Al Anbar				
Camp	Mercury; Camp Abu Ghraib	Abu Ghraib					
Camp	Minden		Basra		June 2011	Transferred to Iraqi govt.	
Camp	C.W. Myler (Baghdad)						Camp of Naval Special Warfare Squadron One during their deployment in 2004
Camp	Nakamura (Nippur)		Babil				Named in honor of Army Spc. Paul T. Nakamura
Camp	Nama		Baghdad	2003	2004	Operations moved to LSA Anaconda	Used by Task Force 6–26 and CIA
Camp	Normandy (Muqdadiyah)		Diyala				
Camp	Outlaw (Green Zone)		Baghdad				
Camp	Pacemaker						Part of LSA Bushmaster near Najaf
Camp	Pacesetter	Samarra	Salah ad Din				Samarra East Air Field
Camp	Paladin						
Camp	Paliwoda (Balad)		Salah ad Din				
Camp	Packhorse; FOB Remagen; Camp Cougar	Tikrit	Salah ad Din				
Camp	Camp Parsons						(expansion at Camp Victory)
Camp	Performance (Mosul)		Nineveh				
Camp	Camp Patriot(Green Zone)						
Camp	Qayyarah		Nineveh				Qayarrah Air Base
Camp	Raider; FOB Dagger (Tikrit)		Salah ad Din				
Camp	Ramadi; Camp Blue Diamond; Camp Champion Main; Camp Hurricane Point	Ramadi	Al Anbar	2007	2011		2nd Advise and Assist Brigade, 82nd Airborne Division; 2-319 Airborne Field Artillery; 1–325 Airborne Infantry
Camp	Reasoner II (Sahl Sinjar, Tal Afar)	Sinjar	Nineveh	2003	October 2009	Transferred to Iraqi Army	
Camp	Red Knight						
Camp	Redcatcher						Rasheed Air Base
Camp	Redemption (Abu Ghraib)						
Camp	Renegade	Kirkuk	Kirkuk	April 2003		Renamed Camp Warrior in 2004	Kirkuk Air Base
Camp	Ridgeway (Al Taqaddum)						
Camp	Ripper (Al Asad)		Al Anbar				
Camp	Roach; Camp Hadithah	Haditha	Al Anbar				
Camp	Rustamiyah also known as Camp Cuervo						Rasheed Air Base
Camp	Sather		Baghdad	April 2003	December 2011		Baghdad International Air Base
Camp	Scania (Nippur)	Hashimiya	Babil	March 2003	July 15, 2010	Transferred to Iraqi Army	Convoy Support Center (CSC) Scania, on MSR Tampa about 4 miles west of Al Shomali. Last unit: 389th Combat Service Support Battalion.
Camp	Schwedler	Fallujah	Al Anbar	2007			Named in honor of Special Warfare Operator (SEAL) Joseph C. Schwedler
Camp	Shield (Baghdad)						
Camp	Slayer		Baghdad				Part of the Victory Base Complex
Camp	Smitty	Samawah	Muthanna	March 2003		Handed over to Iraqis in July 2006	Used by American, Dutch, British and Australian troops.
Camp	Snake Pit (Ramadi)		Al Anbar				
Camp	Solidarity (Camp Al-Tadamum); Camp Gunsligner	Adhamiyah	Baghdad				
Camp	Speicher; COB Speicher	Tikrit	Salah ad Din	2003		Handed over to Iraqis in October 2011	Used by Task Force ODIN
Camp	St. Mere (Fallujah)		Al Anbar				
Camp	Steel Dragon (Green Zone)		Baghdad				
Camp	Steel Falcon	Al Rashid	Baghdad				
Camp	Stone (Sulaymaniyah)	Silêmanî	Sulaymaniyah				Kurdistan Region
Camp	Strike (Mosul)		Nineveh				
Camp	Striker		Baghdad				Part of the Victory Base Complex
Camp	Sullivan (Baghdad)						
Camp	Sustainer						
Camp	Sycamore		Salah ad Din				Al-Sahra Air Base
Camp	Taji	Taji					Taji Air Base
Camp	Taqaddum	Fallujah	Al Anbar	March 2003			Taqaddum Air Base was handed over to Iraqis on April 5, 2020
Camp	Thunder						Baghdad International Air Base
Camp	Top Gun (Mosul)		Nineveh				
Camp	Trebil; Camp Gibbons	Ar-Rutba	Al Anbar				
Camp	Twin Tower						
Camp	Ultimo (Baghdad)						
Camp	Union I (Camp Al-Tawheed Al-Awal); Camp Greywolf	Al-Sijood					Al Sijood Presidential Site
Camp	Union II (Camp Al-Tawheef Al-Thani); Camp Warrior	Al-Sijood					Al Sijood Presidential Site
Camp	Victory 51 papa (Abu Ghraib)						
Camp	Vigilant (Abu Ghraib)						
Camp	Viper	Al-Zubair	Basra				Jalibah Air Base
Camp	Volunteer; Camp Provider (Baghdad)						
Camp	War Horse		Diyala				Baqubah Air Field
Camp	Whitehorse		Dhi Qar				
Camp	Whitford		Dhi Qar				Tallil Air Base
Camp	Wolf; Camp Miller						Kuwait
Camp	Wolfpack (Green Zone)		Baghdad				
Camp	Zadan (Zadan)						
Camp	Zaytun (Erbil)		Erbil				Kurdistan Region
Camp	Zulu (As Suwayrah)	Al-Suwaira	Wasit	2003	August 21, 2005	Turned over to the Iraqi army	As Suwayrah Air Base

== Combat outposts (COPs) ==
Type	Name	District	Governorate	Opened	Closed	Fate	Notes
COP	Amanche		Baghdad				
COP	Annihilator						Unused trade school in Ameriya
COP	Apache	Adhamiyah	Baghdad				
COP	Assassin	near Jisr Diyala	Baghdad/Diyala	2007			Location 33.308677, 44.617434 Former Truck Depot
COP	Attack	West Al Rashid	Baghdad	2007			Former Boxing Gym
COP	Ayres						
COP	Aztec	South of Baghdad International Airport	Baghdad				
COP	Bama		Diyala				
COP	Banchee						
COP	Battle	Al Rashid	Baghdad				
COP	Beretta						
COP	860/Blackfoot	Al Hadar/East Rashid	Baghdad	2007			Chaldean Pontifical Babel College Church Complex
COP	Blickenstaff	Mosul	Nineveh				
COP	Blue Babe Bridge / Georgian Bridge						(Route Blue Babe, across the Diyala River)
COP	Bone Zulu						South Tahrir
COP	Cahill	Al-Mada'in	Diyala	2007	2011		33.144972, 44.572930
COP	Callahan	Adhamiyah	Baghdad				
COP	Carver	Salman Pak		2008	2011		33.083224, 44.599440; Baker Boys: Inside the Surge
COP	Cashe	Jisr Diyala					33.208018, 44.523323
COP	Cashe South		Baghdad	2007	July 2010	Transferred to the Iraqi Police	33.20664164070701, 44.519090597883114 Built right next to Al Tuwaitha Nuclear Reactor that was bombed.
COP	Casino; COP Wildcard	Al-Mansour	Baghdad				
COP	Chaos	Ba'quba	Diyala				
COP	Cleary	Al Wihda	Diyala	2007	2008		33.139267, 44.692545
COP	Cobra Cabana		Baghdad	2007			
COP	Commando BAR (Base Al Razul)		Baghdad	2007			
COP	Corregidor	(near Haswah, Al Yusufiyah)		2007			
COP	Dragon	Yusifiyah	Baghdad	2007	2008	Transferred to the Iraqi Army	Last unit: 3rd Battalion, 187th Infantry Regiment, 3rd Brigade Combat Team, 101st Airborne Division (Air Assault).
COP	Ellis	Barwana	Al Anbar	2006			
COP	Falcon	Ramadi	Al Anbar				
COP	Ford	Adhamiyah	Baghdad				
COP	Gator		Baghdad				Nestled in the Dora market
COP	Golden	Wādī Tharthār	Al Anbar	2007	August 2007	Turned over to the Iraqi Army	North of Fallujah off MSR Golden
COP	Grant	Ramadi	Al Anbar				
COP	Haditha Dam	Haditha	Al Anbar		December 2008		
COP	Hatoon	Ba'quba	Diyala				
COP	Hawas	Wādī Tharthār	Al Anbar				MSR Golden, Northeast of Lake Tharthar Dam and Canal
COP	Hutal; COP Rath						
COP	Iron	Ramadi	Al Anbar				
COP	Khatoon	Ba'quba	Diyala				
COP	Meade						
COP	Murray	Arab Jibor	Baghdad				
COP	Old Mod	Al Rashid	Baghdad				Old Ministry of Defense Building
COP	Nepsa		Nineveh	2007	2009	Turned over to the Iraqi Army	East Side of Tigris Al Sharqat *BTrp 1/3 ACR*
COP	North	Al-Qa'im	Al Anbar				
COP	Norris		Baghdad				
COP	Ocotal / Ocotol	Anah	Al Anbar				
COP	Old Baqubah	Ba'quba	Diyala				
COP	Old Mob						
COP	Qasr `Amij (160k)	Ar-Rutba	Al Anbar	2007	2010	Turned over to Iraqi Army	Site of the 29th Brigade, 7th IA Division
COP	Rabiy	Mosul	Nineveh				
COP	Rawah	Rawah	Al Anbar				
COP	Remagen		Salah ad Din				
COP	Resolve						
COP	Rock						
COP	Romeo	Ba'quba	Diyala				
COP	Ruger						
COP	Salie						(Nahrawan)
COP	San Juan	Southwest of Baghdad International Airport	Baghdad		2007	Abandoned	Bombed out garage/barracks destroyed. Remnants of tower remain.
COP	Sedgwick		Al Anbar		August 2009	Turned over to the Iraqi Army	Downgraded from a FOB sometime between 2008 & 2009
COP	Shan	Mosul	Nineveh				
COP	South	Al-Qa'im	Al Anbar				
COP	Shocker	Badra	Wasit	2007	July 2011		Located in Zurbatiyah
COP	Spear	Ramadi	Al Anbar				
COP	Sword	Ramadi	Al Anbar				
COP	Summers						
COP	Tampa	Mosul	Nineveh				
COP	Tehrir / Tarear / Tahrir	Ba'quba	Diyala				
COP	Texas	Sadr City	Baghdad				
COP	Tripoli						
COP	War Eagle						
COP	102	Rusafa	Baghdad				
COP	402						
COP	727						
COP	742						
COP	821	southwestern neighborhood of Saidiyah	Baghdad				

== Contingency operating base (COBs) ==
Type	Name	District	Governorate	Opened	Closed	Fate	Notes
COB	Adder; Camp Adder; LSA Adder; Camp Cedar I Camp Cedar II	Nasiriyah	Dhi Qar		December 2011	Nasiriyah Airport	3rd Advise and Assist Brigade, 1st Cavalry Division; 1–77 Armor; 2–82 Field Artillery; 219th Battlefield Surveillance Brigade; 1–163 Infantry
COB	Asad		Al Anbar				4–6 Infantry; 2-325 Infantry
COB	Basrah; Camp Basrah		Basra		December 2011	Transferred to civilian control	Contains U.S. Consulate.
COB	Erbil		Erbil				
COB	Scania		Babylon				
COB	Warhorse						

== Contingency operating sites (COSs) ==
Type	Name	District	Governorate	Opened	Closed	Fate	Notes
COS	Besmayah		Baghdad				
COS	Bucca		Basra				
COS	Cobra		Baghdad				4–9 Cavalry
COS	Delta; FOB Delta; FOB Al Kut; Camp Chesty	Kut	Wasit	April 2003	October 2011	Transferred to Iraqi Control	6–9 Cavalry; Kut Air Base
COS	Echo	Diwaniya	Al-Qādisiyyah				1–82 Field Artillery; 2–8 Cavalry; 3/3 Armored Cavalry
COS	Endeavor; FOB Endeavor	An Najaf	Najaf				
COS	Garry Owen		Maysan				3–8 Cavalry
COS	Hammer		Baghdad		2011		Located near Besmaya Range Complex
COS	Kalsu		Babylon				1st Advise and Assist Brigade, 1st Cavalry Division; 2–5 Cavalry; 3rd Armored Cavalry Regiment (Advise and Assist Brigade); 1/3 Armored Cavalry
COS	Korean Village	Ar-Rutba	Al Anbar				
COS	Mahmudlyah	Al-Mahmudiya					
COS	Marez; FOB Marez; Camp Diamondback	Mosul	Nineveh	2004			4th Advise and Assist Brigade, 1st Armored Division; 2–13 Cavalry; 2–29 Field Artillery; 6–17 Air Cavalry; 5–82 Field Artillery; 1–9 Cavalry
COS	Taqaddum	Fallujah	Al Anbar				
COS	Umm Qasr	Al-Zubair	Basra				
COS	Warrior		Kirkuk				6–17 Air Cavalry; 4th Advise and Assist Brigade, 1st Armoured Division; 1–5 Field Artillery; 1st Advise and Assist Brigade, 1st Cavalry Division; 1–14 Infantry; 2–12 Cavalry
COS	Warhorse	Baqubah	Diyala				2nd Advise and Assist Brigade, 1st Cavalry Division; 1–8 Cavalry

== Firebases (FBs) ==
Type	Name	District	Governorate	Opened	Closed	Fate	Notes
Firebase	Morehead	Ba'quba	Diyala		October 2011	Handover to Iraqi Forces	US Special Forces base located in the city of Baqubah. Last occupied by ODA 2135.
Firebase	Saham	Al-Qa'im	Al Anbar		March 2020		34.361286°N 41.129709°E

== Forward operating bases (FOBs) ==
Type	Name	District	Governorate	Opened	Closed	Fate	Notes
FOB	Abu Ghraib	Abu Ghraib	Baghdad	2004	September 2006		
COP	Aggie	Hammam Al Allil/Mosul	Nineveh				
FOB	Al Asad	Haditha	Al Anbar	2003			Ayn Al Asad Airbase
FOB	Al-Tawheed Al-Thalith		Baghdad				
FOB	Animal		Baghdad				
FOB	Arrow	Al-Daur	Saladin	May 2003			
FOB	Attack		Baghdad				
FOB	Atlas; Hellhound						
FOB	Baharia		Al Anbar				
FOB	Bandit Island		Baghdad				
FOB	Beast	Samarra	Salah ad Din				
FOB	Bernstein	Tooz	Salah ad Din	2003		Transferred to the Iraqi army in 2006	Tuz Khurmatu Air Base
FOB	Blue Diamond	Ramadi	Al Anbar				
FOB	Black	Fallujah	Al Anbar				
FOB	Blickenstaff	Mosul	Nineveh				
FOB	Brassfield-Mora	Samarra	Saladin				
FOB	Broomhead		Baghdad				
FOB	Bulldog						
FOB	Byers		Baghdad				
FOB	Caldwell; Camp Caldwell	Balad Ruz	Diyala	2003	April 3, 2010	Dissolved into the Kirkush Military Training Base	Named in honor of Army Specialist Nathaniel A. Caldwell
FOB	Callahan	Adhamiyah	Baghdad	March 2007	January 3, 2009	Closed down	Occupied by the 4th Infantry Division until recently. Originally captured by the 2–82nd Airborne, was in an old, burned-out shopping mall.
FOB	Carpenter	Salman Pak		2003			Salman Pak, previously used by Fedayeen Saddam as a training camp (before 2003)
FOB	Champion Main; Camp Blue Diamond	Ramadi	Al Anbar				
FOB	Chosin	Iskandariya/Al-Musayab	Babil	2003	2005	Renamed; FOB Iskandariyah	Located on the grounds of the Musayyib Power Plant
FOB	Cobra	Khanaqin	Diyala	2003		Transferred to Iraqi Control	Located in Jalawla
FOB	Comanche	Abu Sayada					
FOB	Constitution		Baghdad				
FOB	Cooke		Baghdad				
FOB	Courage	Mosul	Nineveh				
FOB	Corregidor						
FOB	Crossbow						
FOB	Cruz-Morris		Salah ad Din				
FOB	Dagger						
FOB	Danger	Tikrit	Saladin	May 2004	2005		Formerly FOB Ironhorse
FOB	Daniels						
FOB	David	Najaf	Najaf				
FOB	Duke	Najaf	Najaf	2004	October 1, 2006	Transferred to Iraqi Control	
FOB	Dibbis; Dibis; Dibis Camp; Camp Dibis	Dibis	Kirkuk				
FOB	Eagle	Balad	Saladin	2003	2004	Renamed FOB Paliwoda	
FOB	Echo	Diwaniyah	Al-Qādisiyyah			31.968192, 44.910140	It served as a Spanish (known as Camp Espania), Polish, and American base during different periods of the Iraq War.
FOB	Eden	Hīt	Al Anbar				
FOB	Edge						
FOB	Fallujah		Al Anbar				
FOB	Faylok	Al-Muqdadiya	Diyala				
FOB	Ferdinand		Baghdad	2007			U.S. Army Special Forces and Iraqi Special Forces FOB created on Camp Liberty
FOB	Ferrin-Huggins		Baghdad				Rasheed AB
FOB	Fortitude	Mosul	Nineveh				Faisaliyah District
FOB	Freedom	Green Zone	Baghdad				Formerly used by Uday Hussein
FOB	Fulda	Tel Afar	Nineveh				
FOB	Funston						
FOB	Gabe	Ba'quba	Diyala				
FOB	Gaines Mills	Kirkuk	Kirkuk				
FOB	Garry Owen	Amarah	Maysan	2003	2011	Transferred to Iraqi Army Control	
FOB	Ghost	Erbil	Erbil (Kurdistan Region)				
FOB	Givens						
FOB	Glory	Mosul	Nineveh				
FOB	Gold	Fallujah	Al Anbar				
FOB	Grant						(Tal Ashtah AB)
FOB	Grizzly; FOB Spartan; FOB Red Lion; FOB Barbarian	Al Khalis	Diyala	April 2003	January 2009		FOB Grizzly is located within Camp Ashraf
FOB	Guardian City	Fallujah	Al Anbar				(Al Taqaddum AB handed over to Iraqis on April 5, 2020)
FOB	Gunner	Al-Taji					(Taji AB)
FOB	Hammer	Besmaya	Baghdad	2007			33.791944, 44.605278 Besmaya Range Complex
FOB	Hawk		Baghdad				
FOB	Hellhound; Atlas						
FOB	Hit		Al Anbar				
FOB	Honor	Green Zone	Baghdad				
FOB	Hope; Camp Hope; Camp War Eagle		Baghdad				
FOB	Hopping						
FOB	Hotel	Najaf	Najaf				
FOB	Hunter						
FOB	Hurricane	Ramadi	Al Anbar				
FOB	India		Karbala				
FOB	Independence						
FOB	Ironhorse	Tikrit	Saladin	April 2003	May 2004	Renamed FOB Danger	
FOB	Iskandariyah; FOB Chosin	Iskandariya/Al-Musayab	Babil	2005	2009	FOB Dismantled, Power Plant returned to civilian control	Located on the grounds of the Musayyib Power Plant
FOB	Junction City	Ramadi	Al Anbar				
FOB	Justice						
FOB	Kalsu	Al-Musayab	Babil	May 2003	2011	Renamed COS Kalsu	
FOB	Latham; Al Walid						
FOB	Laurie	Fallujah	Al Anbar				
FOB	Loyalty		Baghdad	2003	August 2011		
FOB	Lion					renamed FOB Orion	(vicinity of LSA Anaconda, Balad Air Base)
FOB	Manhattan		Al Anbar				(Habbaniyah AB)
FOB	McHenry	Al-Hawija	Kirkuk				SW of Kirkuk
FOB	MacKenzie	Samarra	Saladin				Formerly FOB Pacesetter
FOB	Melody	Sadr City	Baghdad				
FOB	Mercury	Fallujah	Al Anbar				
FOB	Miller						
FOB	Morgan						Baghdad International Airport
FOB	Muleskinner						Rasheed AB
FOB	Musan	Sinjar	Nineveh				
FOB	Nimur						
FOB	Normandy	Al-Muqdadiya	Diyala	March 2003			
FOB	Omaha	Tikrit	Saladin				
FOB	O'Ryan / Orion	Dujail/Al-Faris	Saladin				
FOB	Pacesetter		Saladin				Now MacKenzie
FOB	Packhorse	Tikrit	Saladin	April 2003			
FOB	Paliden Base	Ramadi	Al Anbar				
FOB	Paliwoda	Balad	Salah ad Din	2004	2009	Transferred to Iraqi Control and renamed Balad Joint Coordination Center.	Formerly FOB Eagle
FOB	Pasab; Wilson						
FOB	Patriot						
FOB	Phoenix	Dohuk	Dohuk			Transferred to Kurdish Control (KRG)	Kurdistan Region
FOB	Prosperity; Camp Prosperity		Baghdad	2003		Transferred to Iraqi Control	Located at As-Salam
FOB	Q-West	Mosul	Nineveh				Formerly FOB Endurance
FOB	Quinn	Ar-Rutba	Al Anbar	2003			Mudayasis Airfield, near An Nukhayb
FOB	Raider	Tikrit	Saladin				
FOB	Reaper						
FOB	Regulars						
FOB	Remagen	Tikrit	Saladin	2003	August 2006	Transferred to Iraqi Control	Tikrit South Air Base
FOB	Ridgeway; Ridgway		Al Anbar				(Al Taqaddum AB handed over to Iraqis on April 5, 2020)
FOB	Roundtop; Round Top	Soran	Erbil				Kurdistan Region
FOB	Rough Rider	Balad Ruz	Diyala				
FOB	Rustamiyah		Baghdad			33.282836, 44.519937	(former Camp Cuervo)
FOB	Sabre	Ramadi	Al Anbar				
FOB	Scania		Babil				
FOB	St. Mere	Fallujah	Al Anbar	September 2003			Renamed Camp Fallujah in March 2004
FOB	Saint Michael; Al Mahmudiyah	Mahmudiya	Baghdad				
FOB	Shawshook		Diyala	2007			Created next to FOB Hammer and Besmaya Range Complex
FOB	Shell						SE of Karbala
FOB	Shield		Baghdad				
FOB	Speicher		Salah ad Din	2003		Renamed COB Speicher	al-Sahra AB
FOB	Steel Dragon	Green Zone					
FOB	Stone; PB Andrea						
FOB	Sykes	Tel Afar	Nineveh				FOB Sykes was located approximately five miles south of the Iraqi city of Tal Afar (Ninewah Governorate) and 40 miles east of the Iraq–Syria border.
FOB	Summerall; Stoddard	Baiji	Saladin				
FOB	Sword						
FOB	Taji						
FOB	Tash	Ramadi	Al Anbar				Joint Security Station erected around an old Iraqi police station
FOB	Tiger	Al-Qa'im	Al Anbar				
FOB	Tinderbox	Baiji	Salah ad Din				
FOB	Trojan Horse	Green Zone	Baghdad				
FOB	Trotter						
FOB	Union III	Green Zone/Baghdad			2011		NATO Training Mission – Iraq; Office Of Security Cooperation – Iraq
FOB	Vanguard	Dujail/Al-Faris	Saladin				
FOB	War Eagle		Baghdad				
FOB	Warhorse						(Baquba Air Field)
FOB	Warrior	Kirkuk	Kirkuk				Kirkuk AB
FOB	Webster	Haditha	Al Anbar				Al Asad AB
FOB	Wilson	Al-Daur	Salah ad Din				
FOB	Wyatt	Balad	Salah ad Din				Balad AB/LSA Anaconda
FOB	Yankee						
FOB	Yusufiyah	Al-Mahmudiya	Baghdad				
FOB	Zulu						

== Joint Base (JB) ==
Type	Name	District	Governorate	Opened	Closed	Fate	Notes
Joint	Balad; Anaconda Logistical Support Area; Camp Anaconda	Balad	Saladin	April 2003	2011	Handed over to Iraqi Air Force on Nov 8, 2011	(Balad Air Base)

== Joint security stations (JSSs) ==
Type	Name	District	Governorate	Opened	Closed	Fate	Notes
JSS	Falcon; Camp Al-Saqr; Forward Operating Base Falcon; Camp Ferrin-Huggins; Camp Falcon; Shield	Al-Rashid	Baghdad	2003	July 2011	Became HQ for 7/2 Iraqi federal police brigade when handed over in 2011	
JSS	India	Mosul	Nineveh				2–7 Cavalry
JSS	Siniyah	Baiji	Salah ad Din		March 2009	Handed over to the Iraqi Police in 2009	Located in Seneia Town
JSS	Ezdehar	Kut	Wasit		June 2009	Handed over to the Iraqi Army in 2009	Located in Shaykh Sa'ad
JSS	Deason	Al-Mahmudiya	Baghdad		October 2011		63rd Armor Regiment, 1st Infantry Division
JSS	Arvanitis-Sigua	Baiji	Salah ad Din	May 2007			

== Patrol bases (PBs) ==
Type	Name	District	Governorate	Opened	Closed	Fate	Notes
PB	Olson	Samarra	Saladin				Supplied by Camp Brassfield Mora
PB	Razor	Samarra	Saladin				Supplied by Camp Brassfield Mora

== Other nomenclatures ==
- Victory Base Complex (VBC), a former cluster of installations surrounding the Baghdad International Airport (BIAP). Successively headquarters for Multi-National Force - Iraq and United States Forces - Iraq.
  - al-Faw Palace, part of the Victory Base Complex, former headquarters of the United States Forces - Iraq in Baghdad
