= McHenry =

McHenry may refer to:

== People ==
- McHenry (name), a list of people with the surname or given name

== Places in the United States ==
- McHenry, California, an unincorporated town - see List of places in California (M)
- McHenry County, Illinois
  - McHenry, Illinois, a city in the county
    - McHenry High School
    - McHenry station, a railway station
- McHenry Dam, on the Fox River in Illinois
- McHenry, Kentucky, a home rule-class city
- McHenry, Maryland, a historic fort and a neighborhood of Baltimore
- Fort McHenry, Maryland, an unincorporated community
- McHenry, Mississippi, an unincorporated community
- McHenry County, North Dakota
- McHenry, North Dakota, a city in Foster County
- McHenry, Virginia, an unincorporated community
- McHenry Township (disambiguation)

== Other uses ==
- Forward Operating Base McHenry, Hawija, Iraq - see List of the United States military installations in Iraq
- McHenry Library, University of California, Santa Cruz
- Bryce Fowler (né McHenry), a character in the animated series Hit-Monkey

== See also ==
- McHenry Mansion, a historic house and museum in Modesto, California
- McHenry Hollow, Missouri, a valley
- McHenrys Peak, a mountain in Colorado
