= Combat Outpost San Juan =

Former US Army outpost in Iraq

Combat Outpost San Juan also called COP San Juan was a United States Army installation in the southwestern region of Baghdad, Iraq during the Iraq War. Located at 33°13'43.9"N 44°15'25.1"E in a rural area approximately 4 kilometers southwest of Baghdad International Airport, it served as a tactical operations center primarily for the 4th Battalion, 27th Field Artillery Regiment, Bravo Battery and the 1st Battalion, 77th Armored Regiment from 2005 until its destruction in 2007.

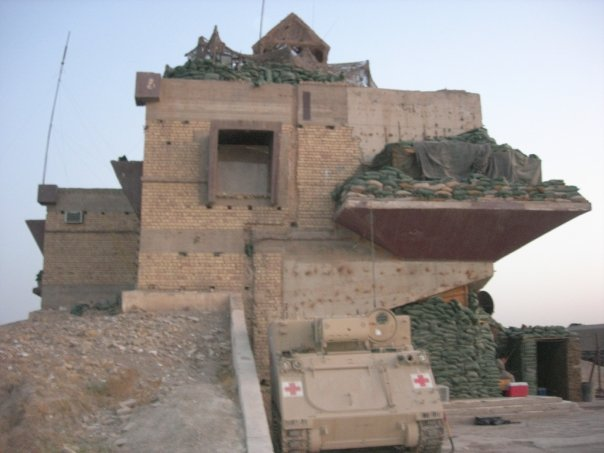
The tower at OP San Juan, 2006

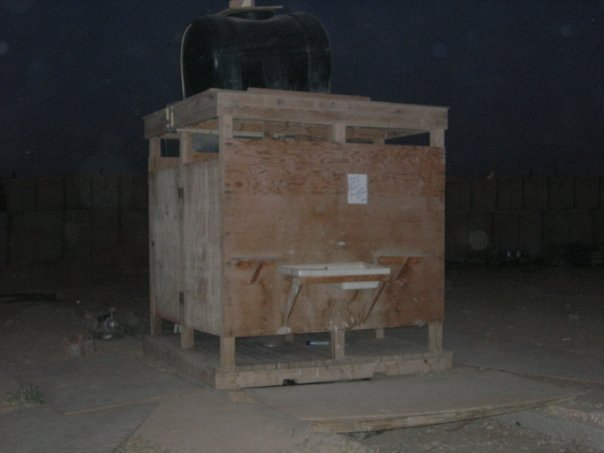
Makeshift shower facility at OP San Juan

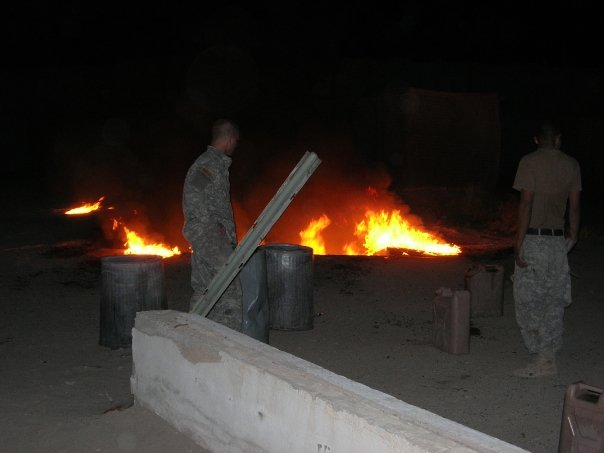
Soldiers manning the Burn pit at OP San Juan

== Facilities ==
Formerly a residence of Uday Hussein, OP San Juan consisted of an area 100 meters in diameter, fortified with Hesco barriers and concertina wire. A largely destroyed 8-car garage was used as a makeshift barracks while a tower served as an observation point for surveillance and defense. Facilities were rudimentary at best, with no running water, sewer, or sanitation services. Electricity was provided by portable generators which necessitated regular dispatches to nearby Forward Operating Bases for fuel. Waste disposal consisted of a burn pit for both trash and human waste.

== Missions ==
OP San Juan was established by Multi-National Corps Baghdad (MND-B) in 2005 to provide overwatch and protection of the southern approach glide-path to the Baghdad International Airport (BIAP). This mission continued until mid 2006 when the main threat to Coalition forces became attack by Improvised Explosive Devices or crudely and often hastily placed roadside bombs.

The Soldiers and Officers manning the OP transitioned into the mission of Route Clearance and human intelligence collection during the summer of 2006. At times only as few as 18 service members were tasked with maintaining the safety of the roadways and local population in nearly 17 square miles of varying terrain consisting of dense urban and sparse rural land. At this time, Additional missions included providing a quick reactionary force to assist Iraqi Police when engaged by insurgent forces and providing security for the cordon of and fortification of southern Baghdad neighborhoods.

Operations at the OP were often on three shifts averaging six hours a piece. A typical day would begin with six hours of guard duty followed by six hours of "outside the wire" patrol. Soldiers would be given six hours of down time in which they were required to perform their assigned area maintenance and personal hygiene duties. After this the cycle would begin again. This cycle kept soldiers on a rolling cycle best facilitating 24-hour operations on, at best, a skeleton crew.

OP San Juan was located in a largely rural area of southwest Baghdad. Troops patrolling from the outpost routinely were ambushed by insurgent attacks consisting largely of small arms fire and Improvised Explosive Device attacks, though it was not uncommon for the post to be attacked by mortars.

One of the primary missions for troops based out of the OP was to maintain positive relations with the residents of Al-Salam, a neighborhood approximately 6 kilometers southeast of OP San Juan. The neighborhood was eventually overrun with and controlled by insurgents despite the soldiers efforts and is now referred to as Al-Radwaniyah.

== Fate ==
The area of operations, (AO) surrounding OP San Juan grew steadily more hostile to U.S. and coalition troops throughout the latter half of 2006. After taking over the AO in October 2006, the 1-77th Armored Regiment effectively closed and abandoned the OP in January 2007.
