= Carr Hollow =

Valley in Missouri, United States

Carr Hollow is a valley in Shannon County in the U.S. state of Missouri. The southeast flowing intermittent stream in the valley is a tributary to McHenry Hollow. The stream source is at 37°17′17″N 91°28′05″W and the confluence with McHenry Hollow is at 37°16′08″N 91°28′54″W at an elevation of 853 feet.

Carr Hollow has the name of the local Carr family.
