= Baiji (disambiguation) =

Baiji is a species of dolphin, the Yangtze River dolphin (Lipotes vexillifer).

Baiji may also refer to:

- Baiji, Iraq, a city
- Baiji District, Iraq
- Baiji Township, Xiuning County (白际乡), Anhui, China
- Baiji Township, Nanning (百济乡), in Yongning District, Nanning, Guangxi, China
- An ancient kingdom in the southern Korean peninsula, called Baekje in Korean

== See also ==
- Bahjí
- Baijiu
