= Sabaa Al Bour =

Saab Al Bour
- Saab Al Bour's location inside Iraq
- Coordinates: 33°27′52″N 44°9′13″E
- Country: Iraq
- Governorate: Baghdad Governorate
- District: Taji District

Population
  - Total: 254,000
- (2010)

Saab Al Bour or Sabaa Al Bour is a small urban city located approximately 18 miles (29 km) northwest of the city of Baghdad, and is located in Taji District of the Baghdad Governorate. In 2003, the population of Saab Al Bour was approximately 120,000. Current population estimates for Saab Al Bour are as high as 254,000.

== History ==
Saab Al Bour, in the volatile Sunni Triangle, included a portion of the city known to locals as the Officers Block, which was set up by Saddam Hussein for members of the Iraqi Republican Guard and their families as a retirement community. The majority of Saab Al Bour's inhabitants are Shia, while small portions of the city and almost all the surrounding villages are Sunni. Sectarian violence erupted in the city in 2005 and early 2006 and some of the worst fighting between Shia and Sunni groups ensued, leaving hundreds dead and driving most of the residents out of the area. Iraqi Security Forces with the aid of Coalition forces took control of Saab Al Bour in the years after and have maintained the peace and security of the area allowing tens of thousands of internally displaced persons to return to the city.

The city lies west of the Tigris river along an extensive canal system that brings needed water for drinking and irrigation for agricultural lands. The city is also located near Camp Taji, which came under American control following the 2003 U.S. invasion of Iraq.

== See also ==
- Baghdad Governorate
- List of cities in Iraq
- Iraq war
