= Forward Operating Base Paliwoda =

FOB Paliwoda or Camp Paliwoda was a US forward operating base (FOB) in Balad, Iraq. The base was named for Captain Eric Paliwoda, an Engineer Officer and West Point Graduate from Farmington, Connecticut serving with the 3rd Brigade Combat Team, 4th Infantry Division, who was killed in an enemy mortar attack in Balad on 2 January 2004; it had formerly been called FOB Eagle.

== History ==
FOB Paliwoda, formerly known as FOB Eagle, was established in 2003 by 1-8 Infantry, 3rd Brigade Combat Team, 4th Infantry Division out of Fort Carson, CO. The base was renamed FOB Paliwoda in memory of Captain Eric Paliwoda who was KIA on 2 January 2004. Captain Paliwoda was in his command post in Balad, Iraq when it came under mortar attack. He was assigned to 4th Engineer Battalion, 3rd Brigade Combat Team, 4th Infantry Division (Mechanized).

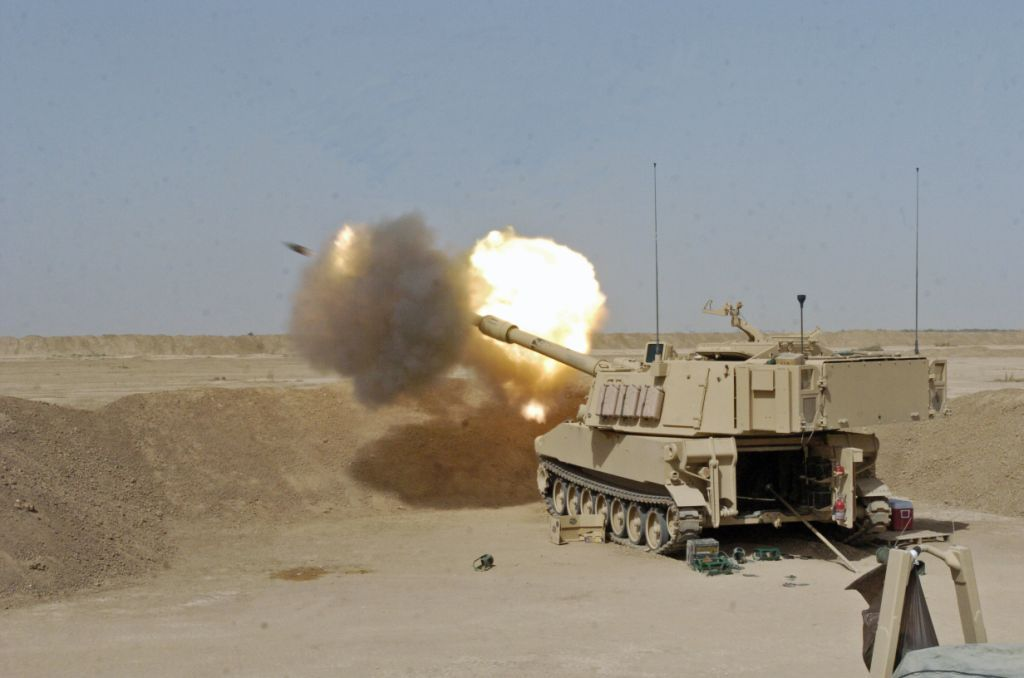
American M109 firing in Iraq. c.2007

During Operation Iraqi Freedom II (2004), the camp was occupied by elements of the U.S. Army's 1st Infantry Division, 1st Battalion 18th Infantry, Charlie Company, 2nd Platoon Warpigs. 1-77th Armor Regiment). It was during OIF II (2005) that the Balad Joint Cooperation Center (B-JCC) was established by TF 1-77AR. OIF III saw 3rd U.S. Army Infantry Division elements (Task Force 5-7 Cavalry, consisting of Bulldog, Combat, Devil and Headhunter Troops), commanded by Lt. Col Jody Petery and under operational command of the 42nd Infantry Division, occupied the post. Serving as the main counter battery and route security between samara and North Baghdad (Al Taji) some major actions that happened included The fall of 2005 coordinated insurgent bombing attack on the city of Balad that resulted in approximately 125 local civilian deaths including the District Police Chief, and 100 wounded, due to 3 VBIEDs detonated in coordination with a 60mm mortar attack as a major mosque was ending its service, overflowing the local medical treatment centers and causing massive casualty evacuations by both US and Iraqi forces. Over 130 counter battery missions were fired by 1-41 Artillery in support of Samarra, LSA Anaconda, Fob Dragon, Fob Paliwoda, and Fob Orion within 30 km of the M109A6 Paladins stationed 24/7 at Paliwoda to combat constant indirect fire threats in the area.

In October 2006, as part of Task Force Lightning under the umbrella command of the 25th Infantry Division, elements of the U.S. 3rd Battalion 8th Cavalry Regiment (Warhorse), 1st Cavalry Division took control of FOB Paliwoda. The Warhorse Battalion was charged with monitoring and clearing the Jabauri Peninsula, a hot bed for terrorists fleeing from places like Syria, Iran, and Pakistan. In October 2007, 3/8 CAV, 1CD turned over control to elements of 1/32 CAV, 1st BCT, 101st Airborne Division. In October 2008, the 101st conducted Relief in Place/Transfer of Authority (RIP/TOA) with 3-4 CAV (Nightraiders), 3BCT (Broncos), 25ID (Tropic Lightning). Early in 2009, Bravo and Charlie Troops, 3-4 CAV would leave the FOB and live on Joint Base Balad (JBB). The HHT elements of 3-4 CAV (including both the SCO and SCSM) and Apache Troop, would remain on FOB Paliwoda until October 2009, when they turned over control of the FOB to HHC, 1-28 INF, an Infantry Battalion from 1st Infantry Division based out of Fort Riley, Kansas.

Forward Operating Base Paliwoda is a former training base for Saddam Hussein's elite fighters. The base is shaped like a fat horseshoe; its perimeter is 1½ miles long. On the north side is a road and the entrance. On the south there's a canal, on the east a mosque, and on the west a school soccer field. In the middle, behind giant chain-link fences, is housing still occupied by the families of former Iraqi soldiers. One side of the horseshoe used to be a school, but it is now the battalion headquarters. The other side used to be a training camp for Saddam Hussein's guerrilla fighters. The FOB itself has numerous towers that outlines the edge of the base, and these towers were used as guard towers on 24/7 shifts. The FOB also contained makeshift motor pools, makeshift mechanic areas, and a concrete slab utilized as a landing pad for helicopters. On the northeast corner of the FOB is a compound used exclusively by a Special Forces ODA Team. Security on the FOB is provided by the Private Security company "Sabre", who primarily contract Ugandan citizens.

Forward Operating Base Paliwoda, like many bases in Iraq, has portable shower units for soldiers to use. But at Paliwoda, persistent problems with the makeshift electrical system installed by an Iraqi contractor mean the water often is cold if it is running at all. The MWR (Morale, Welfare and Recreation) building at Paliwoda began with about 15 computers and 10 telephones for soldiers to communicate with family at home, a second-hand ping pong table, a television, and a few board games; it has since been reduced to the telephones and computers. Once a day a convoy delivers food from the Kellogg, Brown and Root chow hall at Anaconda, unless the unit in control of the FOB has cooks attached to them. There is also a gym with weight lifting equipment.

== Current use ==
On 15 June 2009, during a ceremony, U.S. soldiers lowered the American flag and Iraqi soldiers raised the Iraqi flag at the handover of Forward Operating Base Paliwoda to Iraq, as the Balad Joint Coordination Center.

== See also ==
- List of United States Military installations in Iraq
