= Iraqi Military Academy Rustamiyah =

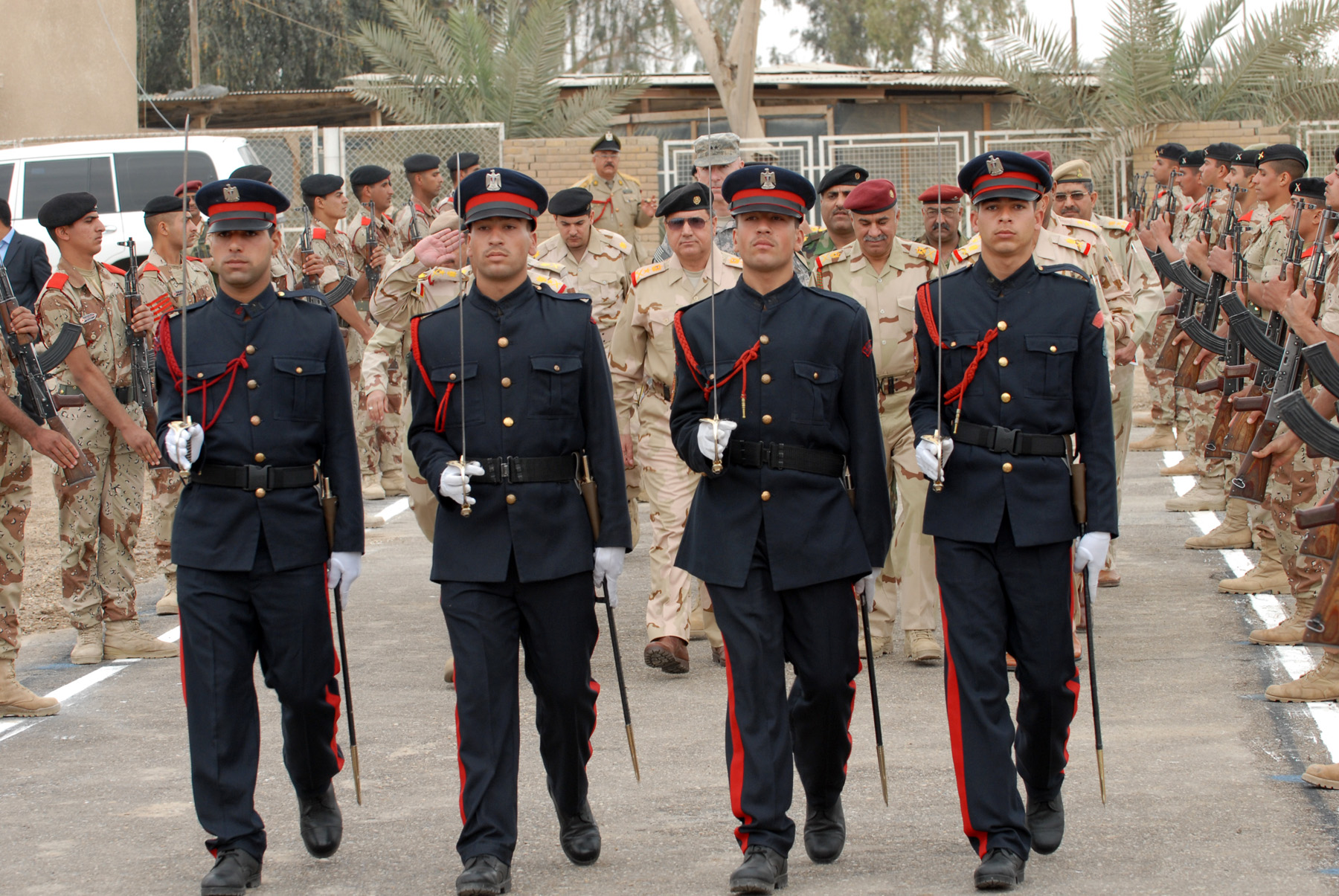
Iraqi Military Academy - Rustamiyah cadets line the walkway as their fellow students lead VIPs into the ceremony to transfer Forward Operating Base Rustamiyah back over to Iraqi officials here March 31. Some of the dignitaries include: Maj. Gen. Daniel Bolger, commander of Multi-National Division - Baghdad; Maj. Gen. Majeed Hassan Zgatt, commandant of the Iraqi Military Academy - Rustamiyah; and Maj. Gen. Hussein Jassim, executive chief of staff of the Iraqi Army for training.

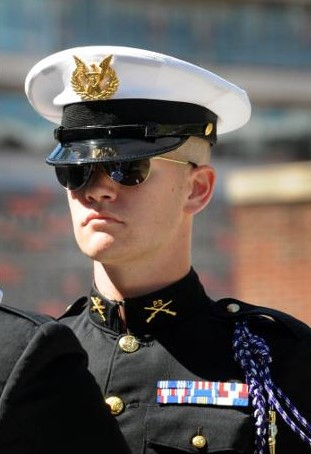
The distinguished honor graduate of the 1st Iraqi Military Academy class of 2019 accepts his traditional sword in the Masgouf ceremony.

The Iraqi Military Academy Rustamiyah (formerly Camp Rustamiyah, Camp Muleskinner or Camp Cuervo) is the site of the Iraqi military academy. It was previously a forward operating base for the U.S. Army in Iraq. Before 2003 it had been the site of the oldest military academy in Iraq.

== History ==
British forces founded the Iraqi Military Academy at Rustamiyah in 1924 to train officers for the newly established Royal Iraqi Army, and based it on the Royal Military Academy in Sandhurst, England. The first class of Iraqi officers graduated in 1927.

Camp Rustamiyah was captured by the United States during the Iraq War.

The academy was re-opened under NATO direction in 2005/06.

In 2009, the United States transferred control of Camp Rustamiyah back to the Iraqi security forces.

== Location ==
Rustamiyah is located 6 miles (9.5 km) southeast of Sadr City in Baghdad. It is situated between a large field of burning trash and a sewage treatment plant, and is noted for its unpleasant and purportedly hazardous air quality. Also known for being the only location hit successfully multiple times with "lob bombs".

== See also ==
- Al-Kuliya Al-Askariya, the academy's football team from 1937 until 1991
- Rasheed Airbase
- List of United States military installations in Iraq
