= As-Salam Palace =

Iraqi palace completed in 1999

Al-Salam Palace
- قصر السلام
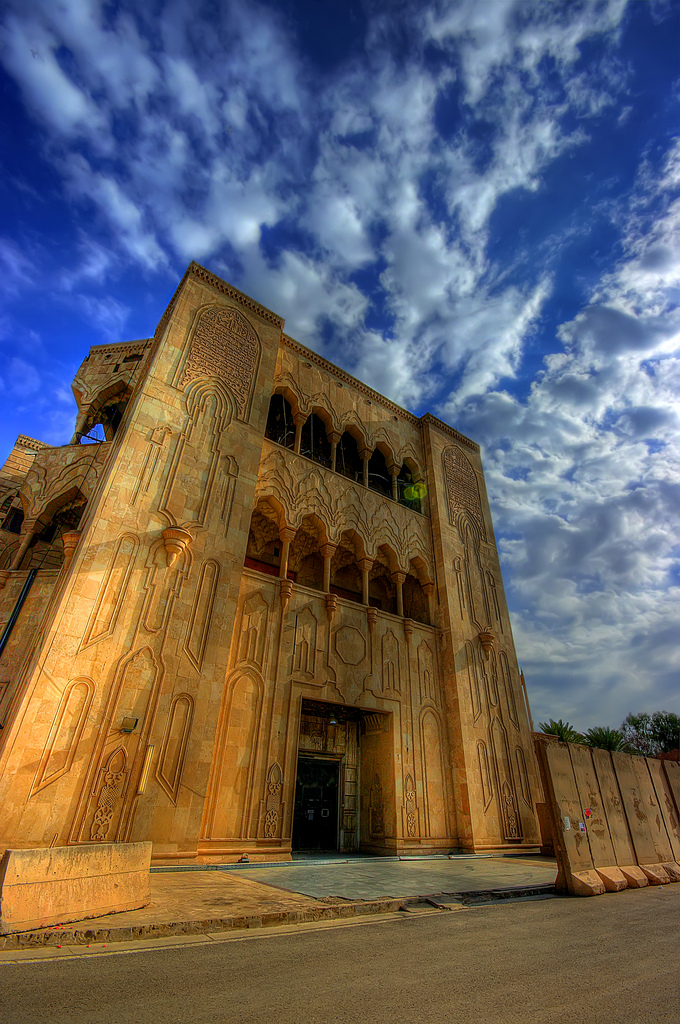
- The exterior of Al-Salam Palace

General information
- Location: Baghdad, Iraq
- Coordinates: 33.30084800°N 44.36133400°E
- Year built: 1990s
- Completed: 1999
- Owner: Government of Iraq

Technical details
- Material: Marble, granite
- Floor count: 6 (including false floors)
- Floor area: 1,000,000 square feet (93,000 m^{2})

As-Salam Palace (Arabic: قصر السلام, lit. 'Peace Palace') is a palace located on Al-Kindi Street in the Green Zone of Baghdad, Iraq. Rather than serving as the residence of the former president of Iraq Saddam Hussein and his family, it primarily housed visiting foreign dignitaries. Since 2012, the palace has been certified as a Republican Palace.

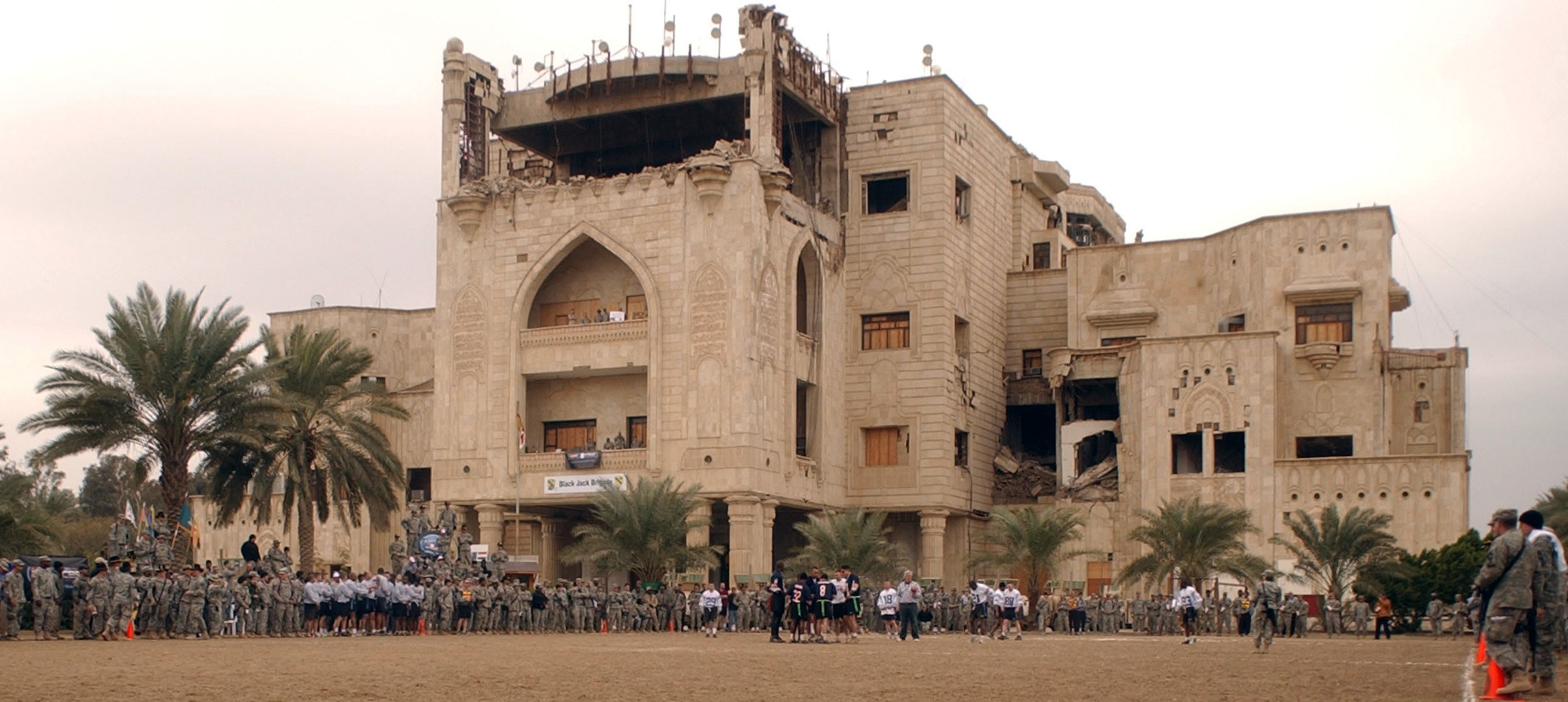
2007 photo of the palace during a Coalition forces American football game.

== Architecture ==
As-Salam palace has 200 rooms with approximately 1,000,000 square feet (93,000 m^{2}) of floor space. There are six floors, three of which are usable (others serve as 'false floors'), and two large ballrooms. The palace is internally lined with marble floors decorated with hundreds of thousands of hand-cut pieces, granite walls, and ceilings also adorned with thousands of hand-carved and inlaid hand-painted flowers.

The palace is surrounded by a sequence of square tiles bearing the initials of Saddam Hussein (S & H); the Arabic letters are "Saad" & "Haa"." The tiles are clearly visible from the top of the palace. Iraqis report that the palace dome used to be topped with a life-sized statue of Saddam.

Fireplaces around the lake in front of the palace are actually vents used to provide fresh air to bunkers below the lake. The bunkers are now inaccessible, having been flooded and sealed off by coalition forces.

In the palace basement lies an entrance to one of many concrete tunnels running beneath the city of Baghdad. These ventilated tunnels were built to provide access to other palaces, government facilities and Baghdad International Airport.

== History ==
=== Construction ===
Al Salam palace is located on the site of the former Republican Guard Headquarters, which was destroyed during Operation Desert Storm of the Gulf War. The palace was commissioned by Saddam Hussein, and construction was completed in late 1999 at a cost ranging from $100 million to $1 billion.

=== Iraq War ===
As-Salam Palace was taken over by U.S.-led Coalition forces during the 2003 invasion of Iraq in the Iraq War. The edifice sustained significant damage from seven guided bombs during the shock and awe campaign, and was then ransacked from below when left unguarded.

The palace served as headquarters for the Joint Area Support Group, and was known to Coalition forces as Camp Prosperity and Forward Operating Base (FOB) Prosperity.

The palace formerly displayed four busts of Saddam Hussein on the corners, which were removed by US forces, who also toppled his statue in Firdos Square.

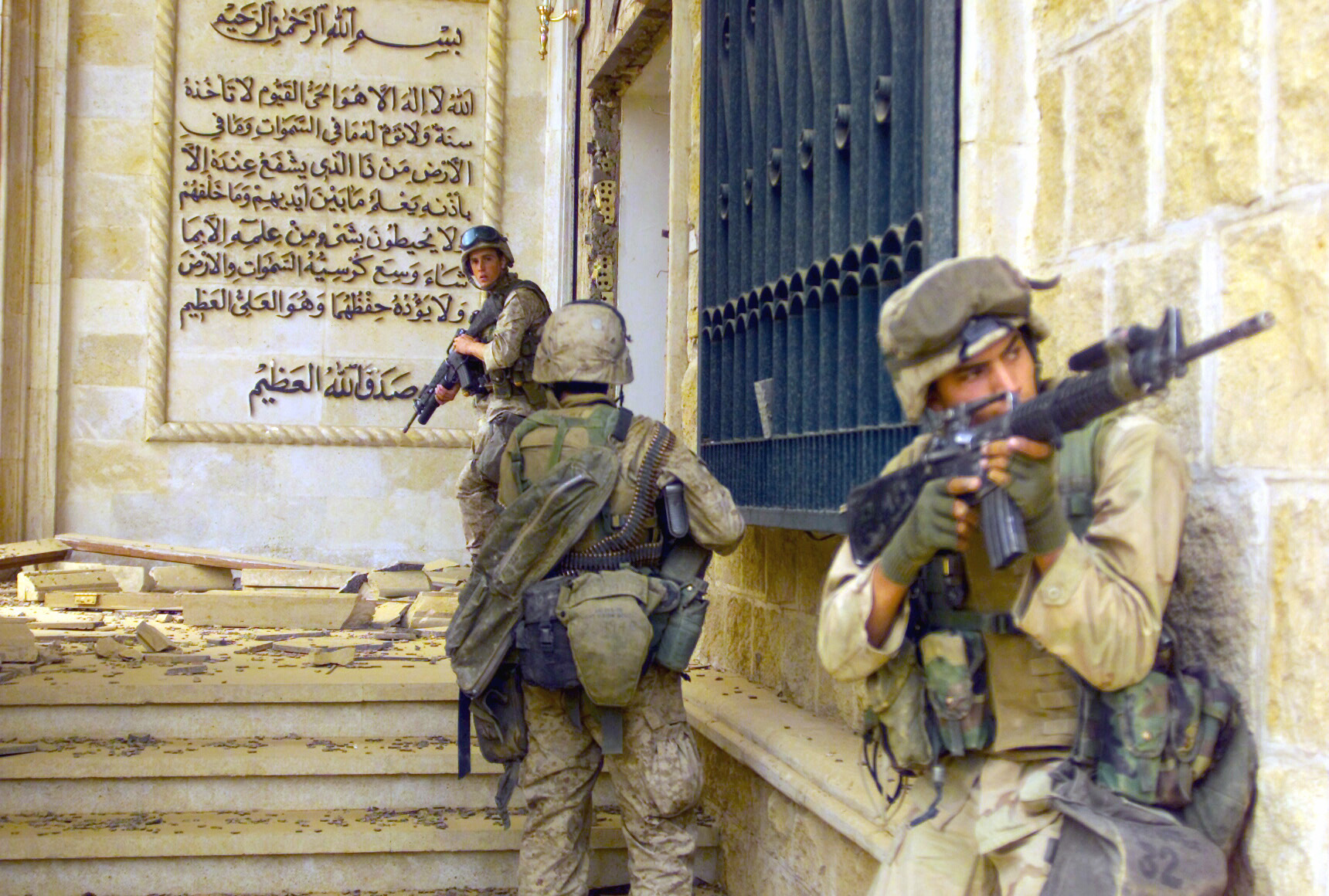
U.S. marines from 1st Battalion, 7th Marines entering the palace, 2003

==== Camp Arkansas ====
By late 2003, around 3,000 people occupied the palace and the grounds stretching approximately 10 acres beyond, of which 1,000 were civilians and 2,000 were soldiers. 75% were American, 15% were British, and the remainder comprised Australians, Spaniards, Italians, Poles, Romanians, and even a handful of Ukrainians. The palace was surrounded by trailer parks, and the section on the front lawn, made up of tents occupied by 500 people, was nicknamed "Camp Arkansas" for its likeness with trailer parks found in rural America.

==== Camp Prosperity (Camp Izdehar) ====
In April 2004, Logistical Support Area Highlander was located at Al Salam Palace, adjacent to the Green Zone. In September of the same year, as part of an army-wide initiative to give Baghdad facilities more pleasant names, Camp Highlander was renamed Camp Prosperity, which translates to Camp Al-Isdehar in Arabic. Camp Prosperity was home to the 1st Battalion of the 161st Infantry Regiment of Washington state's 81st Infantry Brigade. They were attached to the 3rd Brigade Combat Team of the 1st Cavalry Division, and were responsible for combat and civil-military operations in South East Baghdad.

==== Restitution to Iraq ====
From April 2009 to January 2010, FOB Prosperity was run by the Joint Area Support Group - Central (JASG-C) 32nd Infantry Brigade Combat Team (IBCT) from Wisconsin. In 2012, the FOB was occupied by the Iraqi Government, which took over operations after the U.S. military drawdown.

=== Current use ===
As of 2022, the palace has partially fallen into ruins. Parts of the masonry and the interior have sustained enormous damage, and the once unblemished white dome is now gutted and entirely rusted.

== See also ==
- List of United States Military installations in Iraq
