= Forward Operating Base Hope =

FOB Hope
- Sadr City, Baghdad Governate in Iraq

Site information
- Owner: Ministry of Defence
- Operator: Iraqi Army

Location
- Coordinates: 33°23′21.0″N 44°30′16.0″E

Site history
- Built: May 2003
- In use: 2003-current

Forward Operating Base Hope is the current name of Camp War Eagle which was the name of the United States Army camp located at the northeast corner of the Baghdad slum known as Sadr City. It was established in May 2003 by 1st Squadron, 2nd Armored Cavalry Regiment (known as the War Eagles) and B Company, 2nd Battalion, 37th Armor Regiment which is an element of 1st Brigade, 1st Armored Division. War Eagle was located on the site of a pre-war Iraqi Army base, and as such was walled and somewhat suited for use as a forward operating base.

Some of the first battles with the Mahdi Army were fought out of this camp in early 2004.

Soldiers from the 1st Brigade, 1st Cavalry Division including 1st Battalion, 12th Cavalry Regiment, 2nd Battalion, 5th Cavalry Regiment and Bravo Company 20th Engineer Battalion (United States), were stationed at Camp War Eagle and fought against the Shia militia of Muqtada al Sadr known as the Mahdi Army during the uprising which began April 4, 2004.

The troops of Task Force Lancer's (2-5 Cav, C1-82FA, and B/1-12 Cav) and Task Force Charger's (1-12 Cav, B/2-5IN, B/20E) stay at War Eagle (March '04-05') was one of the deadliest periods in the Iraq war. On April 4, 2004, this was the launch point for what was to be named "Black Sunday". During the six-hour night battle, 8 were killed and 60+ were wounded. This initial fight would go on for 10 days. It was during this time that Casey Sheehan was killed. Cindy Sheehan, his mother, would use her son's death to protest the war in Iraq.

On Mothers' Day, 2004 also known as "The Day of Steel Rain", Camp War Eagle was attacked with approximately 100+ detonated mortar rounds and rockets raining down inside the camp in a 24-hour period.

It was renamed FOB Hope in early 2005 by the arriving Task Force 3/15 from the 3rd Infantry division's 2nd Brigade Combat Team, who relieved Task Force Lancer and conducted operations in Sadr City until relieved in late 2005.

On March 10, 2006, the camp, then known as Forward Operating Base (FOB) Hope, was transferred from Multi-National Division – Baghdad control to the Iraqi Army. Specifically, 3rd Battalion, 67th Armored Regiment, 101st Airborne Division handed over control to 3rd Battalion, 2nd Brigade ("The Tiger Brigade"), 6th Iraqi Army Division.
