= Camp Gannon =

US Marine Corps installation in Iraq

Camp Gannon was a United States Marine Corps installation in Al Anbar province, Iraq.

Situated near the border between Iraq and Syria, Camp Gannon is an abandoned warehouse complex in Husaybah, an area traditionally used by smugglers between the two countries.

In April 2005, 3rd Battalion 2nd Marines India Company repelled an organized attack of Iraqi insurgents (estimated numbers between 40 and 100) driving several vehicles full of gunmen, utilizing three explosive devices and the use of a fire truck as an attack vehicle.

The camp was named in honor of Major Richard J. Gannon, commanding officer of Lima Company, 3rd Battalion, 7th Marines. Major Gannon was awarded the Silver Star after being killed in action on April 17, 2004, attempting to save three members of his company.

== See also ==
List of United States Military installations in Iraq
