= Forward Operating Base Danger =

United States Military Operation

- Tikrit, Iraq
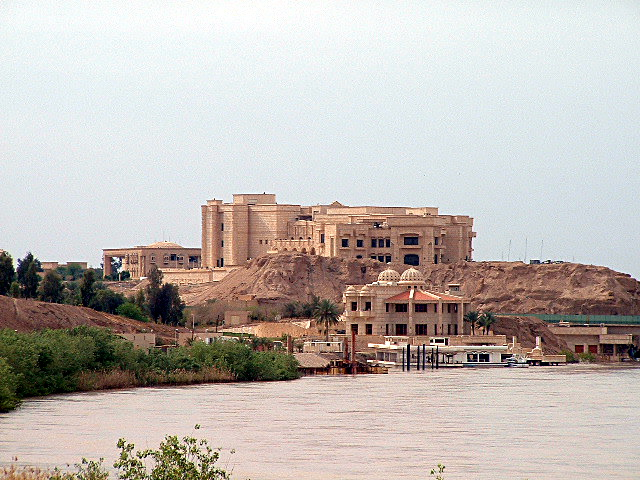
- Saddam Hussein's presidential palace in Tikrit dominated the base.

Site information
- Type: Forward operating base
- Controlled by: United States Army

Site history
- In use: 2003–2005
- Battles/wars: Iraq War

Garrison information
- Garrison: 4th Infantry Division (Mar 2003 – Mar 2004); 1st Infantry Division (Mar 2004 – Feb 2005); 42nd Infantry Division (Feb-Nov 2005)

Forward Operating Base Danger was a forward operating base operated by the United States Army in Tikrit, Iraq from the time of the occupation of Iraq in 2003 until November 2005 when it was handed over to the government of Iraq.

== History ==
The base was centered on Saddam Hussein's presidential palace complex. Founded as Forward Operating Base Ironhorse the installation served as the headquarters garrison for the 4th Infantry Division from April 2003 until handover and redesignation under the 1st Infantry Division in May 2004. (FOB Iron Horse was renamed FOB Patriot and then renamed to FOB Loyalty, during OIF II and OIF III. Also the location was in East Baghdad. It started with 1st Cav/1st Brigade and 3RD ID came in Dec/January 2005.)FOB Danger was in the North. FOB Iron Horse was in East Baghdad, which housed the prison.

The United States Army's 1st Infantry Division and 42nd Infantry Division occupied the base at different times. On 7 June 2005 Captain Phillip Esposito and 1st Lieutenant Louis Allen from the 42nd were killed at the base in what was the first incident of fragging among US forces during the Iraq War.

== See also ==
- List of United States Military installations in Iraq
- U.S. Occupation of Iraq (2003-11)
