= Haqlaniyah =

Al-Haqlaniyah Arabic: الحقلانية
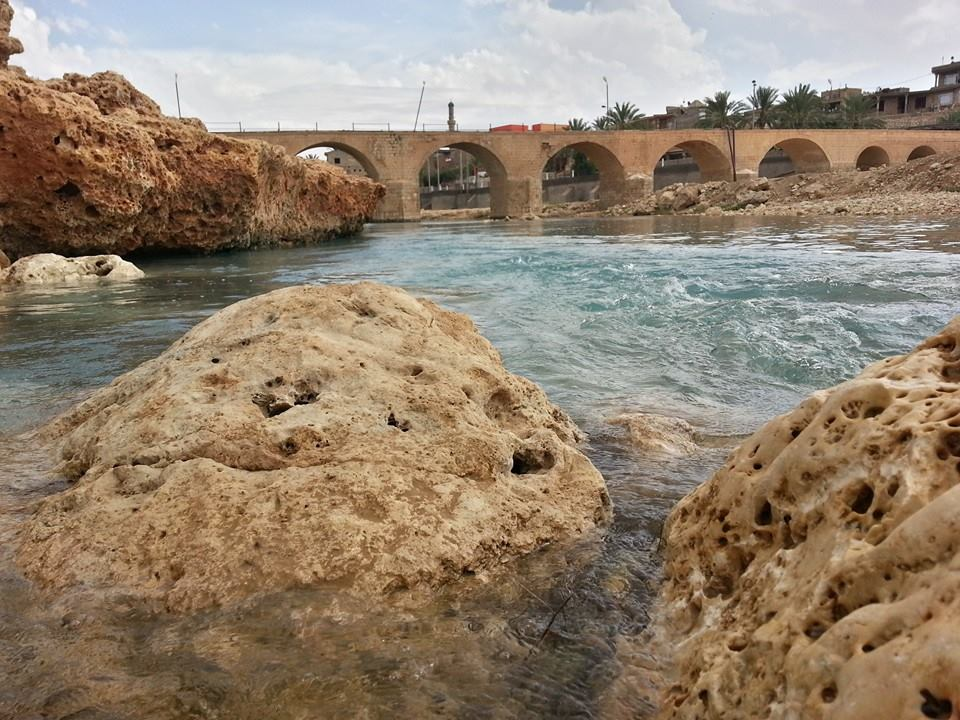

- Location within Iraq
- Coordinates: 34°5′20″N 42°21′38″E
- Country: Iraq
- Province: Al-Anbar
- District: Haditha

Population
  - Total: 15,000
- Time zone: UTC+3 (GMT+3)
- Postal code: 31009

Al-Haqlaniyah (Arabic: الحقلانية, al-Ḥaqlānīyah) is an Iraqi town on the Euphrates River in Al-Anbar province.
