= Forward Operating Base Grizzly =

FOB Grizzly (formerly FOB Spartan, FOB Red Lion and FOB Barbarian) was a U.S. Army Forward Operating Base located within Camp Ashraf, Diyala province, Iraq. It was located near Al Khalis, approximately 20 kilometers (12.4 mi) west of the Iranian border and 60 km (37 mi) north of Baghdad.

The FOB was named after the callsign for the 49th Military Police Battalion. They were in charge of the FOB, Task Force, and MP Battalion from October 2005 until October 2006 and their call sign was "Grizzly" dubbed after the California Grizzly Bear on the State Flag. The TASK FORCE 49, the 49th Military Police Battalion, and Forward Operating Base was Commanded by LTC Anthony Palumbo and CSM Paul George. They conducted operations with over 2,000 U.S. and Coalition forces and 300 Contract employees.

== Units that have deployed to FOB Grizzly ==
2003-2004

- Bravo Company, 3d Battalion, 67th Armored Regiment, 3d Armored Brigade Combat Team, 4th Infantry Division (FOB Barbarian)
- Alpha Company, 3d Battalion, 67th Armored Regiment, 3d Armored Brigade Combat Team, 4th Infantry Division (FOB Gator)
- 324th Military Police Battalion (PA ARNG), 800 Military Police Brigade

2004-2005 530th Military Police Battalion 336th Military Police Battalion

- 793rd Military Police Battalion

2005-2006

- 49th Military Police Battalion
- 4th MEB(AT)
- HHB 1-102nd Field Artillery Forward
- 110th Military Police Company
- Bravo Battery, 1st Battalion, 142nd Field Artillery
- Alpha Company, 1st Battalion, 194th Armor
- Alpha Troop, 1st Squadron, 124th Cavalry
- Bravo Battery, 2nd Battalion, 123rd Field Artillery
- Bulgarian 1st Guard Company
- Bulgarian 2nd Guard Company
- Muldovan EOD Team
- 25th ROC
- Charlie Troop, 1st Squadron, 113th Cavalry
- Delta Company, 32nd Signal Battalion
- HHC, Signal, 1st Squadron, 32nd Cavalry

2006-2007

- 382nd Military Police Battalion
- Bravo Company, Anti-Terrorism Battalion, 2nd Marine Division
- Charlie Battery 1/213th ADA
- Alpha Company, 1st Battalion 9th Marines, 2D MARDIV

2007-2008

- 504th Military Police Battalion
- Alpha Company, 1st Battalion 9th Marines, 2D MARDIV
- Bravo Company, Anti-Terrorism Battalion, 2D MARDIV
- 735th Combat Support Company
- 728th Military Police Battalion
- US Marine Task Force National Capital Region
- Alpha Battery, 1st Battalion, 161st Field Artillery
- 1161ST Forward Support Company (FSC)
- Alpha Company, 63rd ESB
- Bravo Troop, 1st Squadron, 102nd Cavalry
- Delta Company, 250 BSB
- 324th Military Police Battalion
- 519th Military Police Battalion
- 424th Camp Liaison Detachment
- 540th Camp Liaison Detachment

2009

- HHC, Alpha, Bravo and Charlie Companies, 1st Battalion, 24th Infantry Regiment

2009-2010

- Charlie Company 1-128th IBCT, WIARNG
- Hawkeye, Blackhawk, and Comanche Companies 1st Battalion 23rd Infantry Regiment
- E co 536th FSB
- Charlie Battery 1st Battalion 37th Field Artillery Regiment (Rock Tac)

== See also ==
- List of United States Military installations in Iraq
