= Joint Security Station Falcon =

Former United States military operating base in Iraq

Coordinates: 33.2122°N 44.3686°E

Camp Al-Saqr, referred to by some media sources as Camp Falcon, Forward Operating Base Falcon, Joint Security Station (JSS) Falcon, or Combat Outpost Falcon, was a United States military forward operating base in Iraq a short distance outside Baghdad, some 13 kilometres (8.1 mi) south of the Green Zone. In OIF 2004; it was designated as "Camp Ferrin-Huggins". As of 2009, the base housed up to 5,000 troops.

== History ==
In September 2003, the construction of FOB Falcon (Camp Al-Saqr) in Iraq was a major engineering project for the 439th Engineer Battalion. The battalion transported more than 100,000 tons of gravel for constructing roads, and took part in construction of the base's structures.

Because FOB Falcon was considered by Iraqi officials to be outside of Baghdad proper, it was not affected by the planned withdrawal of American combat troops from Iraqi cities by June 30, 2009.

It was not uncommon for bases like FOB Falcon to be mortared by insurgents who used the surrounding neighborhoods as cover, risking the lives of Iraq civilians and those who lived on the FOB while they served. Small arms fire and the use of RPGs (Rocket Propelled Grenades) were also common and more prevalent during the early years of the deployments.

=== 10 October 2006 attack ===
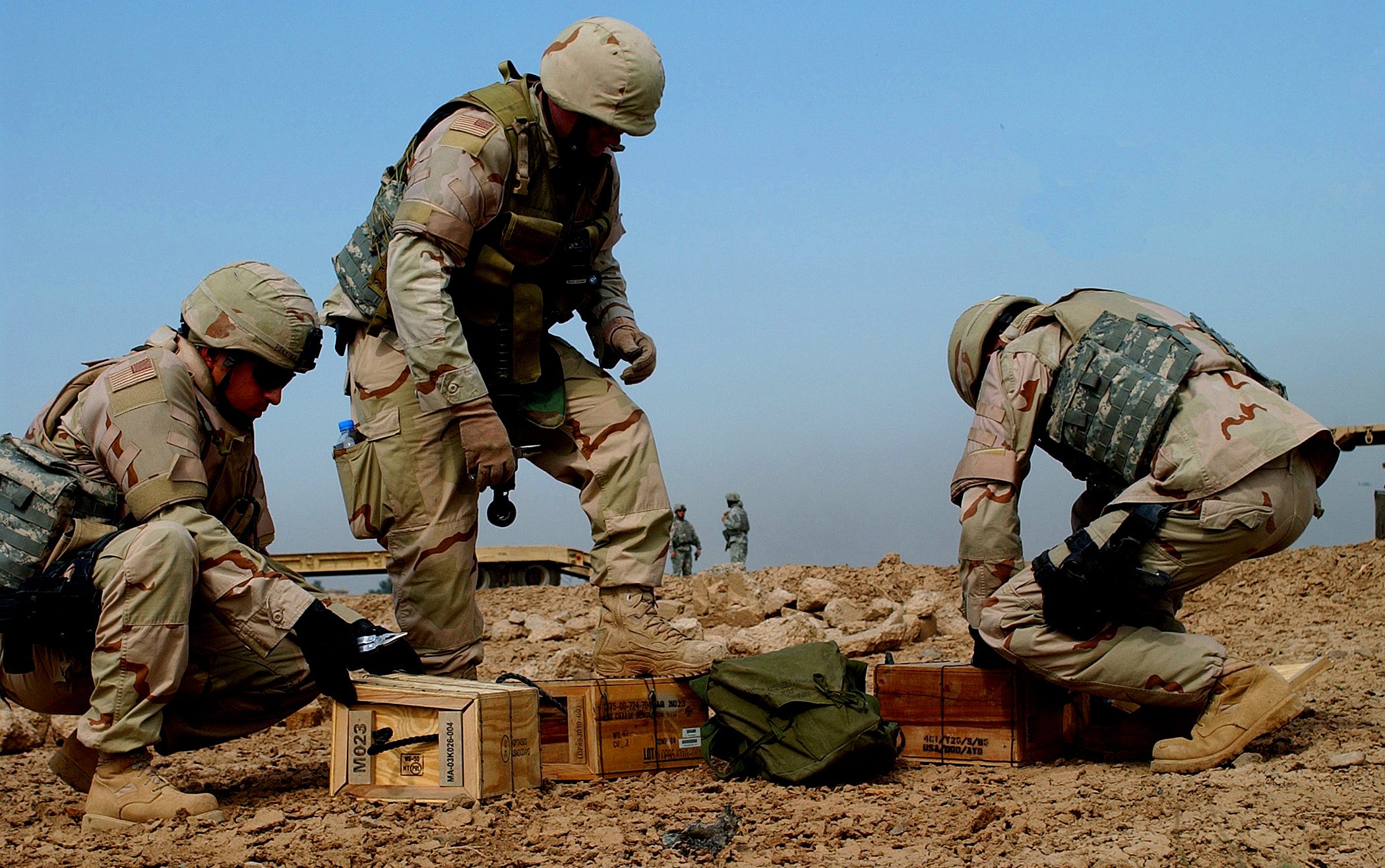
Members of a U.S. Air Force explosive ordnance disposal team unpack C-4 explosives, Oct. 16, 2006. The explosives will be used to detonate a cache of unexploded ordnance recovered from a blast area on Forward Operating Base Falcon, Iraq, following a recent mortar attack. The airmen are assigned to the 447th Expeditionary Civil Engineering Squadron.

On October 10, 2006, at about 10:40 p.m. (1940 GMT), a major explosion rocked the base, reportedly due to the base's ammunition dump being hit by an 82mm mortar round fired by Iraqi insurgents. Further explosions continued for hours. Images of the explosions were carried live on CNN. There were no casualties. According to the official Department of Defense report released by US Central Command, the base resumed normal duties within 24 hours.

Islamic Army in Iraq claimed responsibility for the attack.

=== Operation New Dawn ===
During Operation New Dawn, JSS Falcon was manned by 2nd Advise and Assist Brigade, 1st Infantry Division out of Fort Riley, Kansas. The base was transferred to the Iraqi Federal Police by 5th Squadron, 4th Cavalry Regiment in late July 2011. 5th of the 4th Cavalry had been advising both 2nd and 4th Iraqi Federal Police Divisions. The buildings and the land were turned over to 2nd Iraqi Federal Police Division to be used as a base of operations in the Rasheed district of Baghdad. Before the move, the 2nd IFP Div. was already operationally responsible for the area surrounding JSS Falcon, making the transition relatively seamless.

== See also ==
- List of United States Military installations in Iraq
- United States Forces – Iraq
