= Husaibah Al Sharqiah =

Husaibah Al Sharqiah حصيبة الشرقية
- Coordinates: 33°24′31″N 43°27′0″E
- Country: Iraq
- Province: Al-Anbar
- District: Ramadi

Population
  - Total: 35,000

Husaibah Al Sharqiah (Arabic: حصيبة الشرقية) is a city in the Al Anbar province of Iraq. It was liberated from the control of the Islamic State in 2016.
