= Forward Operating Base Iskandariyah =

Forward Operating Base Iskandariyah (formerly Forward Operating Base Chosin)
- South of Baghdad, Iraq

Site information
- Type: Forward Operating Base
- Owner: Iraqi
- Controlled by: Iraq
- Open to the public: Military areas closed to civilians; Musayyib Power Plant under civilian control

Site history
- Built: 2003
- Built by: US Army
- In use: 2003-2009
- Battles/wars: Operation Iraqi Freedom

Garrison information
- Occupants: US Army, Iraqi Army

Forward Operating Base Iskandariyah (Arabic:إسكندرية), or FOB Iskandariyah, was a United States military forward operating base located on the grounds of the Musayyib Power Plant and the banks of the Euphrates River, between the towns of Iskandariyah and Musayyib, Babil Governorate, Iraq from 2003 to 2009.

== Establishment ==
Forward Operating Base (FOB) Iskandariyah was first established as Forward Operating Base Chosin by 1st Battalion, 32nd Infantry Regiment, 1st Brigade, 10th Mountain Division in 2003 during Operation Iraqi Freedom I. The 1st Battalion of the 32nd Infantry Regiment ( 1-32IN ) first landed on the grounds of the Musayyib power plant in September 2003. A ground convoy moved in after negotiating its way through the southern regions of Iraq. After the remainder of the battalion was airlifted in, its entirety moved into the shells of old warehouses. They would live there for weeks. As time passed, the “Chosin Battalion” continued to conduct combat operations from the power plant. Contact was made with both the locals and the enemy. Over time, more civilized structures were erected (wood framed canvas tents, plywood showers, etc.). The soldiers of the ‘Queen’s Own’ continued to fight the opposition in the surrounding AO until the U.S. Marines called them for assistance to the north in Ramadi. This facility largely consisted of tents and other structures of a temporary nature. During this period, 1-32nd IN also established facilities for the 507th Iraqi National Guard Battalion. Responsibility for all these facilities were handed over to 1st Battalion, 6th Infantry Regiment, 2nd Brigade, 1st Armored Division for a brief period, while 1-32nd IN was posted to Camp Habbaniyah near Fallujah in April 2004 before returning in June of the same year. The 1-32nd IN remained at FOB Chosin until the facilities were turned over to the headquarters of the 24th Marine Expeditionary Unit late in 2004. All facilities were partially dismantled following the tenure of the 24th MEU. One remaining vestige of the previous designation carried over in the name of Landing Zone Chosin when the facility became known as Forward Operating Base Iskandariyah.

== Reestablishment as FOB Iskandariyah ==
As the site of a major power production center for the greater Baghdad area, the facility was deemed as vital to continued security operations by the United States military and Iraqi security forces. The location also provided a midpoint for traffic between Baghdad and Karbala. Therefore, a permanent tenant was established with the 1st Battalion, 155th Infantry Regiment, 155th Heavy Brigade Combat Team of the Mississippi National Guard during Operation Iraqi Freedom III, beginning in 2005. Operation Iraqi Freedom IV followed in late 2005 with the transfer of authority to 1st Battalion, 67th Armor Regiment of the 2nd Brigade Combat Team, 4th Infantry Division. A nearby facility for 2nd Battalion, 4th Brigade, 8th Division (Iraqi Army) was established immediately adjacent as Iraqi forces undertook increased organized participation in local security operations. A US Army Military Transition Team was assigned to this facility to oversee training, coordinate combined operations and facilitate additional US military resources. The 1st Battalion, 67th Armor Regiment (1-67th AR) contributed to dramatic improvements in the quality of living facilities and security measures protecting the FOB. In late 2006, authority was in turn transferred to 1st Battalion, 501st Infantry Regiment (Airborne) of the 4th Brigade Combat Team (Airborne), 25th Infantry Division as part of Operation Iraqi Freedom V. This rotation coincided with the Iraq War troop surge of 2007 and the first cooperation with Sunnis formed into what was then locally known as the Concerned Citizens' Program (CCP), part of the wider Sons of Iraq movement. FOB Iskandariyah also experienced a significant increase in forces as 1-501st IN (ABN) expanded into an enlarged battalion task force. Facility improvement continued as well as cooperation with civil authorities to maintain and increase capacity of both the co-located power plant and a nearby gas facility under construction. Attacks against the facility diminished during the period following increased security efforts by US and Iraqi forces.

== Last US military tenant unit and closure ==
After an extended 15-month tour, 1-501st IN (ABN) transferred the FOB to the authority of 3rd Battalion, 7th Infantry Regiment of the 4th Brigade Combat Team, 3rd Infantry Division. Their tenure during Operation Iraqi Freedom VI was marked by a continued decrease in insurgent violence as seen throughout the 2008 campaign year and constituted a factor in the eventual determination to return control of security efforts and government authority to Babil governorate authorities. The return of provincial control also created favorable conditions for the closure of FOB Iskandariyah in late 2008. In 2009, the successors of 3-7th IN, HHC (-) 1st Battalion, 2nd Infantry Regiment 172nd Infantry Brigade, began the process necessary to close American facilities on the installation and pass the FOB to Iraqi control. On 22 February 2009, the 172nd Infantry Brigade formally returned the FOB to Iraqi control.

== Tenant military organizations ==
As Forward Operating Base Chosin

- 1st Battalion, 32nd Infantry Regiment, 1st Brigade, 10th Mountain Division (Attached to 3rd Brigade Combat Team (Airborne), 82nd Airborne Division) (2003–2004)
- 1st Battalion, 6th Infantry Regiment, 2nd Brigade, 1st Armored Division (2004)
- 1st Battalion, 32nd Infantry Regiment, 1st Brigade, 10th Mountain Division (Attached to 1st Regimental Combat Team, 1st Marine Division) (2004)
- Headquarters, 24th Marine Expeditionary Unit (2004)

As Forward Operating Base Iskandariyah

- 1st Battalion, 2nd Marine Regiment (Battalion Landing Team 1–2), 24th Marine Expeditionary Unit (2004–2005)
- 1st Battalion, 155th Infantry Regiment, 155th Brigade Combat Team, Mississippi National Guard (2005)
- 1st Battalion, 67th Armor Regiment, 2nd Brigade Combat Team, 4th Infantry Division (2005–2006)
- 2nd Battalion, 4th Brigade, 8th Division (Iraqi Army) Co-Located (2006–present)
- 3rd Platoon, 988th Military Police Company (2006)
- 1st Battalion, 501st Infantry Regiment (Airborne), 4th Brigade Combat Team (Airborne), 25th Infantry Division (2006–2007)
- 1st, 3rd Squad, 2nd Platoon, 127th Military Police Company (2006–2008)
- 3rd Platoon, 127th Military Police Company (2006–2008)
- 3rd Battalion, 7th Infantry Regiment, 4th Brigade Combat Team, 3rd Infantry Division (2007–2008)
- Team Blacksheep, EOD team of the 760th EOD. (Before their CO was found sleeping around with every ODA team in theater.)
- Headquarters and Headquarters Company, 1st Infantry Division, 18th Infantry Regiment (1-18), assumed control of FOB ISKAN 1/3/2009. 1-18 subsequently reflagged to HHC 1st Battalion, 2nd Infantry Regiment, 172nd Infantry Brigade.
- HHC (-) 1st Battalion, 2nd Infantry Regiment, 172nd Infantry Brigade (2009-closure)

== See also ==
- List of United States Military installations in Iraq
