= Forward Operating Base MacKenzie =

Samarra East Air Base FOB MacKenzie
- Samarra, Saladin Governorate in Iraq
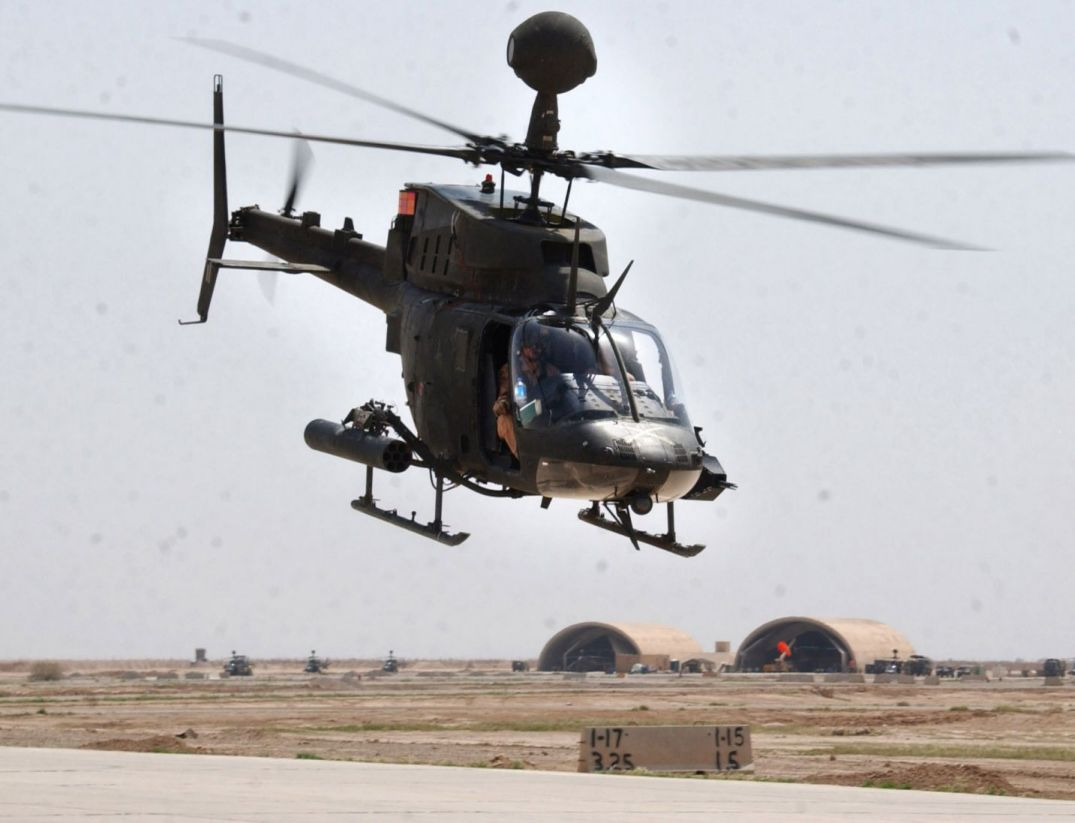
- A helicopter at Forward Operating Base MacKenzie

Site information
- Type: Air base
- Owner: Iraqi Armed Forces
- Operator: Iraqi Ground Forces
- Condition: Defunct

Location
- Shown within Iraq
- Coordinates: 34°9′56″N 44°15′52″E

Site history
- Built: 1983; 43 years ago
- In use: 1983 — 2003 (Iraqi Air Force); 2003 — 2006 (U.S. Armed Forces)
- Battles/wars: Iran–Iraq War; 2003 invasion of Iraq

Airfield information
- Elevation: 60 metres (197 ft) AMSL
Runways
Direction	Length and surface
	3,000 metres (9,843 ft)

FOB MacKenzie, formerly known as FOB Pacesetter and before 2003, Samarra East Air Base, was a U.S. Army Forward Operating Base located near Samarra, Saladin Governorate in northern Iraq approximately 96 kilometers (60 mi) north of Baghdad, and about 12 kilometers (7.5 mi) northeast of the Tigris River. Initially, Samarra East Air Base was constructed in 1983 for operations of the Iraqi Air Force. It participated in the Iran-Iraq War and was closed following the 2003 invasion of Iraq.

== History ==
In 1983, Samarra East Air Base was constructed to improve the deployment flexibility of the Iraqi Air Force (IQAF). It was also part of a national drive to construct new airfields and renovate existing airfields. One 3,000 meter long runway orientated NW/SE was constructed. Additional installation of facilities included 4 high-speed approaches at both ends of the runway, which totalled up to 8, and also one taxiway, one cross-over link, and an apron. There were two dispersal facilities that totalled up to 10 hardstands/aircraft bunkers, with one at the end of each high-speed approaches, and the other two adjoined to the cross-over link. It was in the early-stages of construction by June 1983. At some point, 7 more hardstands were added, totalling up to 17 hardstands with only 12 equipped with a hardened aircraft shelter by 1991.

The airbase is served by a single 9,800-foot (3,000 m) long runway. According to the "Gulf War Air Power Survey", there were 12 hardened aircraft shelters at FOB MacKenzie in 1991. At each end of the main runway are hardened aircraft shelters knowns as "Yugos" which were built by Yugoslavian contractors some time prior to 1985.

=== Forward Operating Base ===
In 2003, the former Samarra West Air Base was converted into Forward Operating Base (FOB) Pacesetter. In July 2003, the 64th Military Police Company deploying at the base to provide security for the 3rd Battalion, 29th Field Artillery Battalion. Immediately, the existing airfield facilities which included a concrete hangar, was repurposed into the headquarters. Despite providing cover against gunfire and artillery, the hangars had little to no cooling function. Ice would be provided by a local vendor, and a refrigerator and fans run by generators kept personnel cool. FOB Pacesetter occupied an 18-square-kilometer (7 sq mi) site and is protected by an 18-kilometer (11 mi) security perimeter. From December 2003 until early 2004, the 3rd Brigade of the 2nd Infantry Division was based there. In 2004, FOB Pacesetter was renamed to FON MacKenzie after Ranald S. Mackenzie, who was a United States Army officer and general in the Union Army during the American Civil War.

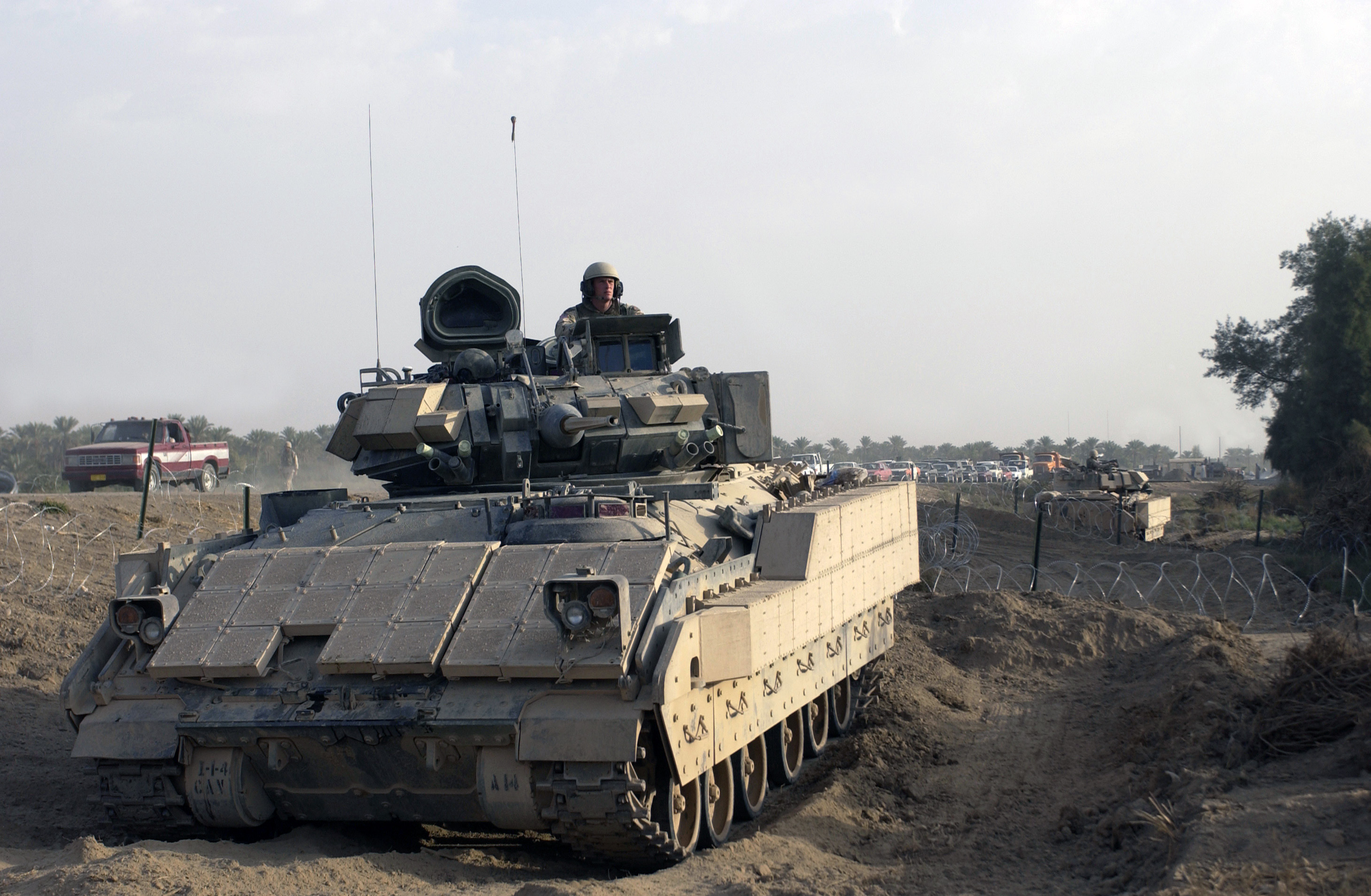
A tank provides security at a traffic control point outside of the base

More than 200 personnel, which included mechanics, pilots, and support staff from the 1st Squadron, 17th Cavalry Regiment, arrived at FOB MacKenzie in February 2005. The unit began a number of upgrades to the existing infrastructure through March 2005. The base's facilities were rudimentary, with the existing aircraft hangar converted into a barracks, while an enclosed headquarters building, expanded and secured mess hall tent, housing trailers arranged into a village layout, and recreational facilities were all built by the unit. 18 new living trailers were delivered, however they were not operational because of the lack of funding for installation, wiring, air-condition, and inspection. Communications were only available months after the unit's arrival, while modest electrical infrastructure were sufficient to support surround-sound systems, computers, and phones. The former runway was used for helicopters supporting ground forces, and since ceased fixed-wing usage. In February 2006, the U.S. Armed Forces withdrew from the base.

== See also ==
- List of United States Military installations in Iraq
