= Fallujah District =

Fallujah District قضاء الفلوجة
- District
- Interactive map of Fallujah District
- Country: Iraq
- Governorates: Al Anbar Governorate
- Time zone: UTC+3 (AST)

Fallujah (Arabic: قضاء الفلوجة) is a district in Al Anbar Governorate, Iraq. Its seat is the city of Fallujah.

== Cities ==
- Fallujah (pop. 350,000)
- Saqulauiah
- Amiriyah Fallujah
- Al Karmah
- Al Enaimih
- Habbaniyah (pop. 80,000)
- Al Rahaliyah
- Al Khaldiya
- Al Zaidan
- Al Fars
