= Haditha District =

Haditha District قضاء حديثة
- District
- Location within Iraq
- Country: Iraq
- Governorates: Al Anbar Governorate
- Time zone: UTC+3 (AST)

Haditha (Arabic: قضاء حديثة) is a district in Al Anbar Governorate, Iraq. It is centred on the town of Haditha. There is a huge lake near the town and a dam in front of it called Haditha Dam, contains six hydroelectric stations, two drainage outlets, and a waterway that includes six holes controlled by radial gates. This dam feeds the electricity needs of Anbar cities.

== Cities ==
- Haditha
- Barwanah
- Haqlaniyah
- Al Khasfa
- Aloos
- Alzawiha
