= Qalat Sikar Air Base =

Qalat Sikar Air Base Camp Basilone Camp Fenway
- Part of Iraqi Air Force (formerly); United States Marine Corps (2003)
- Maysan Governorate, Iraq; Near Qalat Sukkar in Iraq
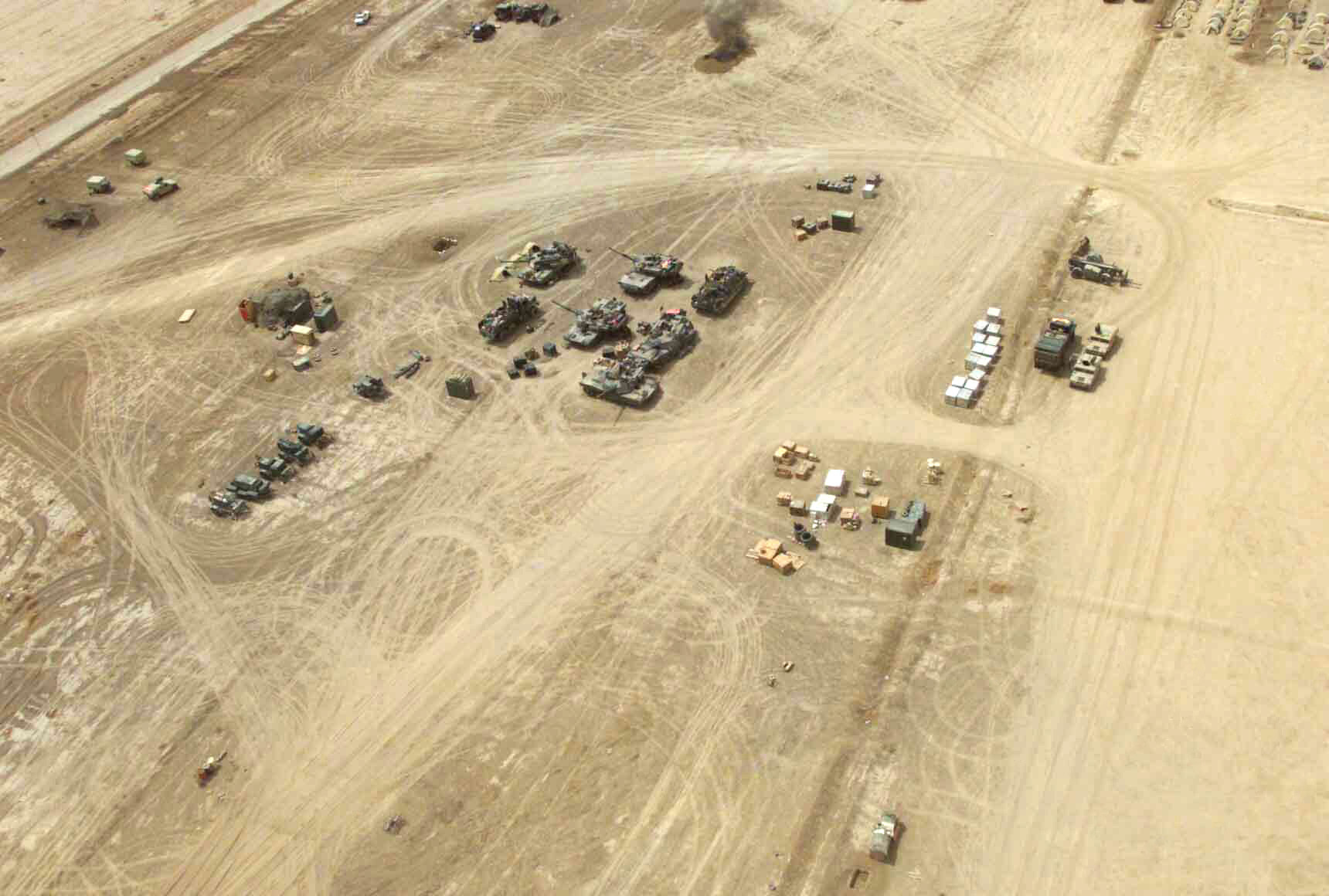
- Aerial view of Camp Fenway, April 2003

Site information
- Type: Airbase
- Owner: Iraqi Air Force (pre-2003)
- Controlled by: Iraqi Air Force (pre-2003); United States Marine Corps (2003)
- Open to the public: No
- Condition: Deteriorating, mostly demolished

Location
- Location of Qalat Sikar Air Base, Iraq
- Coordinates: 31°50′7.33″N 046°18′15.64″E

Site history
- Built: 1970s
- Built for: Iraqi Air Force
- In use: 1970s – 2003
- Fate: Mostly demolished
- Battles/wars: Operation Desert Storm (1991); Operation Iraqi Freedom (2003)

Garrison information
- Garrison: 24th Marine Expeditionary Unit (Special Operations Capable)
- Occupants: Iraqi Air Force (Pre-2003); United States Marine Corps (2003)

Qalat Sikar Air Base is a former Iraqi Air Force base in the Maysan Governorate of Iraq. It was captured by U.S.-led Coalition forces during Operation Iraqi Freedom in 2003.

== Overview ==
Qalat Sikar Air Base was one of several Iraqi Air Force airfields in the mid-1970s which were re-built under project "Super-Base" in response to the experiences from the Arab-Israeli wars in 1967 and 1973.

During the war with Iran, the airfield was a base for a squadron of MiG-23BN fighters, but what equipment it hosted subsequently remains undetermined.

== United States military use ==
The base was heavily attacked by Coalition airpower during Operation Desert Storm in January 1991 and Operation Iraqi Freedom in March 2003. It was seized by the United States Marine Corps in late March 2003.

The Marines of the 24th Marine Expeditionary Unit (Special Operations Capable), while participating in Operation Iraqi Freedom, established their base camp for operations in a patch of dirt at Qalat Sukar [Qalat Sukkar] in Central Iraq. The Qalat Sikar Airbase is nearby, Marine Wing Support Squadron 371 and other units were based there. The area was an unused oilfield which at one time served as farm land. The Marines named their camp after Fenway Park, the major league baseball park in Boston.

In the city of Qalat Sukkar the Ba'ath Party once subjected the locals with violence. Striking poverty demonstrated that the locals need food, water, and electricity. Trash and dead animals littered the ground, and gray sewage runoff covered the streets, indicating a dire need for proper irrigation. Residents of the town crowded its streets and sidewalks to cheer on Marines of the 24th Marine Expeditionary Unit (Special Operations Capable) who arrived to destroy symbols of Saddam Hussein and the Baath Party regime.

During Operation Iraqi Freedom, Marine Medium Helicopter Squadron 263 split from the 24th Marine Expeditionary Unit (Special Operations Capable) and rejoined their parent command, Marine Air Group 29, to conduct missions in Iraq. Based out of the occupied airfield in Jabala, CH-46 Sea Knight helicopters worked exclusively with Task Force Tarawa - the 2nd Marine Expeditionary Brigade (reinforced).

The Marines of the 24th MEU (SOC) came into Iraq on a float that was extended indefinitely. Due to the nature of their mission the Marines did not know when they would get to leave Iraq to return to the United States.

During the time the MEU was at Fenway, many events converged to create lasting impressions about the base camp and about Iraq in general. The 24th Marine Expeditionary Unit (Special Operations Capable) was at Camp Fenway in Southern Iraq on 19 April 2003 during Operation Iraqi Freedom. Camp Fenway was a small base in Central Iraq occupied by Marines of the 24th MEU (SOC) during Operation Iraqi Freedom. Finding a way to connect with family and friends back home, Marines and Sailors from the 24th MEU (SOC) and Marine Wing Support Squadron 371, Marine Corps Air Station Yuma, Az., made use of the tactical phones provided by the 24th MEU (SOC) Joint Task Force Enabler at Camp Fenway in Central Iraq.

Upon arriving at Camp Fenway, the main body of the Command Element was greeted by the sound of a chemical attack siren. The Marines quickly donned their gas masks. After doing so, some froze while others continued to dig the survivability positions that they had already begun. All was silence in the camp except for the clinking of entrenching tools until the 'all clear' was given.

Some weeks later, Lieutenant General Earl B. Hailston, Commanding General, Marine Forces Central Command, paid a visit to the Marines of the MEU at the camp. During a brief speech he gave to the troops, he called out "OORAH!" His call was answered by enthusiastic Marines, who showed even greater energy and motivation moments later as the General's speech was interrupted by the call of, "White Star Cluster!" by a Marine at an observation post. The Marines quickly grabbed their gear and weapons and ran to their fighting positions where they waited for either combat or the sounding of 'all clear'. The Marines returned to their duties when an "all clear" was given.

After several weeks of operating in Iraq, the MEU received orders to redeploy to Amphibious Ready Group shipping for movement back to the US. At that point, the suspense of not knowing how long they would be in Iraq was lifted. Finally, the Marines began to get some idea of when they would be leaving. They went directly from being at Fenway indefinitely to being told they would be leaving in a couple of days. Shortly thereafter, tents began to come down and Marines began packing up to return to their ships - and to showers and hot chow.

Though the 24th MEU (SOC) was not the first to arrive in Iraq, by the time they had arrived, they had already been away from home longer than any other unit in country. For this they received the distinction of being the first to leave Iraq.

Once the 24th MEU (SOC) finished their participation in OIF and received the word to begin the retrograde back to the ships, HMM-263 was tasked with supporting. They conducted troop lifts for the BLT, shuttling them back to the MEU headquarters at Camp Fenway. Then two days of maintenance was conducted on all of the CH-46 helicopters before they began their own retrograde back to the ship. On the April 24th, HMM-263 was reinstated with the MEU and flew back to the Nassau Amphibious ready group, where they wait to go home.

Current aerial imagery shows that the operational structures around the airfield appear to have been demolished and removed. Today the concrete runway and series of taxiways remain exposed and deteriorating to the elements, being reclaimed by the desert.
