= Contingency Operating Site Garry Owen =

Former United States Army base in Iraq

Contingency Operating Site Garry Owen Previously FOB Garry Owen & Amarah Air Base

Site information
- Operator: United States Army; British Army

Location
- Location within Iraq
- Coordinates: 31°49′11″N 047°04′51″E

Airfield information
Runways
Direction	Length and surface
12/30	Asphalt (Disused)
Helipads
Number	Length and surface
01	Asphalt
02	Asphalt
03	Asphalt
04	Asphalt
05	Asphalt
06	Asphalt

Contingency Operating Site Garry Owen is a former United States Army base in the Maysan Governorate of Iraq. It was previously used by the Iraqi Air Force as Amarah Air Base. It was captured by Task Force Tarawa, U.S. Marine Corps during Operation Iraqi Freedom.

== History ==
The air base was a primary air base for the Iraqi Air Force prior to the 2003 U.S. invasion. It had a 10,000 foot runway with numerous taxi-ways leading right out of Hardened Aircraft Shelters (HAS) and laid diagonally to the runways - known as "Trapezoids" or "Yugos". It was a large, expansive base. It is undetermined if it contains underground facilities for aircraft sheltering.

It was apparently abandoned after Operation Desert Storm in March 1991, its proximity to the Kuwaiti border making it unsuitable for use by the Iraqi Air Force.

During the Iraq War, the air base was turned into an operating base for the United States Army with addition of barracks and helipads.

Deployed units:

- 3rd Battalion, Parachute Regiment Headquarters during the invasion of 2003.
- 2nd Squadron, 7th Cavalry Regiment, 4th Brigade Combat Team, 1st Cavalry Division
- Company E, 27th Brigade Support Battalion were deployed here during 2008
- Elements of the 54th Engineer Battalion helped improve the FOB during 2008
- 1st Battalion, 8th Infantry Regiment, 3rd Brigade Combat Team, 4th Infantry Division was deployed here during 2010 followed by 3rd Battalion, 8th Cavalry Regiment in 2011.
- Element of 540th Quartermaster Company, 13th Combat Sustainment Support Battalion, 3rd Sustainment Brigade, 103rd Sustainment Command (Expeditionary) were deployed here during 2010.
- 1st Battalion, 535th Equipment Support Company were deployed here.
- 1st Battalion, 174th Air Defense Artillery Regiment 2010–2011
- 1st Battalion, 204th Air Defense Artillery Regiment 2011
- Riverine Squadron Three Det 2 2009–2010
- Riverine Squadron One Det 1 2010
- 4th Battalion, 6th Infantry Regiment (Regulars), 4th Brigade Combat Team (Highlanders), 1st Armored Division was deployed here from summer 2009 to 2010.

In 2011, rocket attacks against the site injured 3 soldiers and killed 1 soldier. 3rd Battalion 8th Cavalry regiment 1st Cavalry division
