= Al-Miqdadiya District =

Al-Muqdadiya District قضاء المقدادية
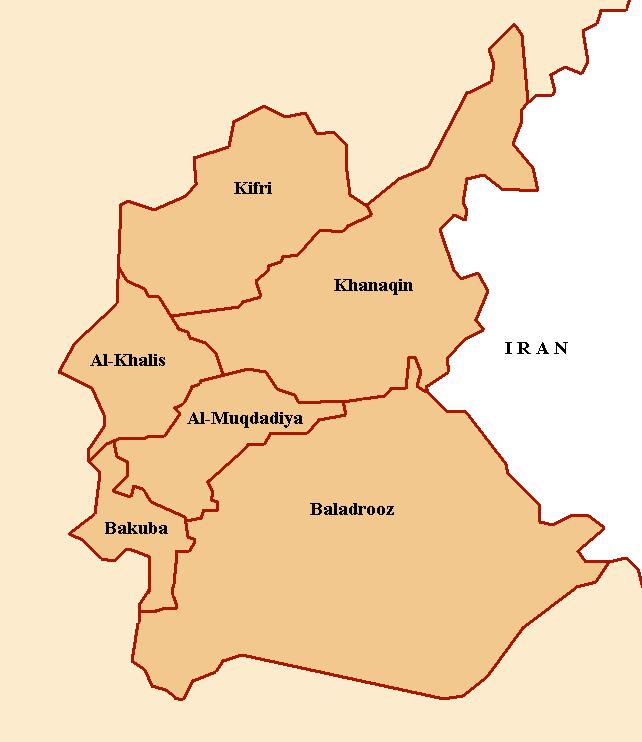
- Districts of Diyala Governorate

- Location within Iraq
- Coordinates: 33.9798°N 44.93623°E
- Country: Iraq
- Governorate: Diyala Governorate

Al-Muqdadiya District (Arabic: قضاء المقدادية) is one of the districts of Diyala Governorate, Iraq.
