= Najaf District =

- District
- Interactive map of Najaf District
- Country: Iraq
- Governorate: Najaf Governorate
- Time zone: UTC+3 (AST)

Najaf District is a district of the Najaf Governorate, Iraq.
