= Samarra District =

Samarra District قضاء سامراء
- District
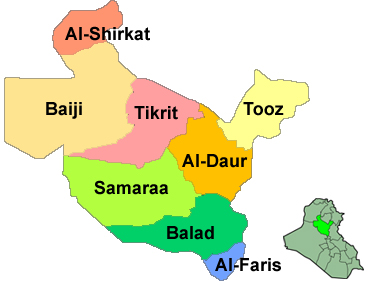
- Interactive map of Samarra District
- Country: Iraq
- Governorate: Saladin Governorate
- Seat: Samarra
- Time zone: UTC+3 (AST)

Samarra District (Arabic: قضاء سامراء) is a district of Saladin Governorate, Iraq.
