= Ba'quba District =

Ba'quba District قضاء بعقوبة
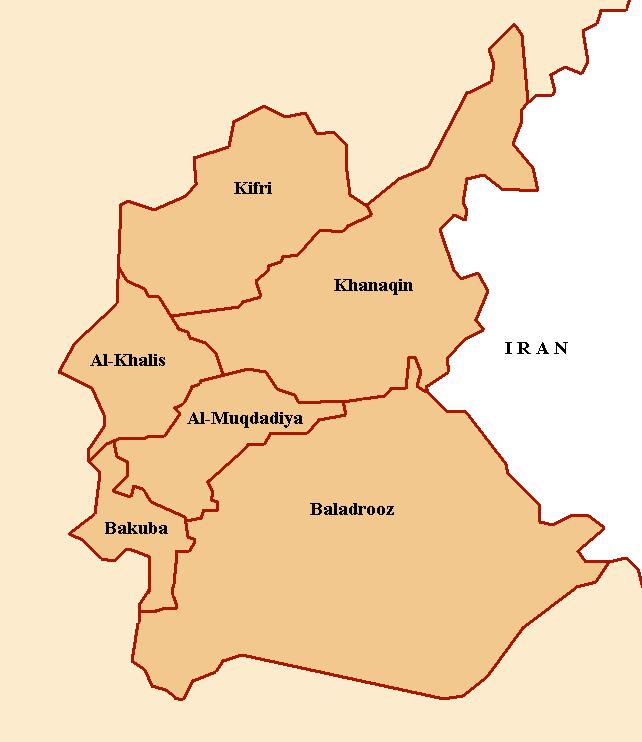
- Districts of Diyala Governorate
- Interactive map of Ba'quba District
- Coordinates: 33.58914°N 44.48952°E
- Country: Iraq
- Capital: Baqubah

Population (2024)
  - Total: 754,785

Ba'quba District (Arabic: قضاء بعقوبة) is one of the districts of Diyala Governorate in Iraq. Its capital Baquba is the capital of Diyala Governate.

== Demographics ==
Ba'quba is the capital of the Diyala Governorate in Iraq. It is one of six districts in the Governorate. Ba'quba is one of the three districts in Diyala that make up 75% of the total population of the Diyala Governorate. The population of Ba'quba is 467,895 people, which is about 38% of the governorate's population. The percentage of the people living under the poverty line in the Ba'quba districts is around 6.6%. In 2012 49% (288 total) of all security incidents in the Diyala Governorate occurred in Ba'quba District. The literacy rate in Ba'quba District is around 86% which is slightly higher than average of 84% for the Diyala Governorate. The unemployment rate is 11%, which is the second to lowest rate after the Kifri District. In the Ba'quba district 80% of residents have access to public water, but almost half reported the quality of the water as bad.

== History ==
The district and city's name is thought to have come from the Aramaic language.

During the time of the Silk Road Ba'quba was a weigh station.

== Economy ==
Ba'quba District is the center of agriculture and commerce in Diyala. It is the center for orange groves, which reach all the way to the Iranian border.

Ba'quba District is home to the DMC (Diyala Media Center), which has one of the Middle East's tallest radio and television antennas at 1,047 feet. The news station offers local news on both TV and radio and provides traffic updates.

== Geography ==
The city of Ba'quba is located some 50 km (30 miles) to the northeast of Baghdad, on the Diyala River, just outside Iraq's Sunni Triangle.

=== Climate ===
The climate in Ba'quba is mostly desert, with mild to cool winters and dry, hot summers. The temperature in the summer averages above 40 C (104 F) for much of the country and can frequently exceed 48 C (118 F). Winter temperatures typically range from 15 to 19 C (59 to 66 F) in the day, down to 2 to 5 C (35–41 F) at night. Sand and dust storms occur during the summer months, bringing uncomfortable conditions for a day or two. The Ba'quba District, on rare occasions, experiences snow in the winter months.
