= Forward Operating Base Freedom =

United States Army base in Baghdad, Iraq

Coordinates: 33°17′52.48″N 44°24′13.13″E

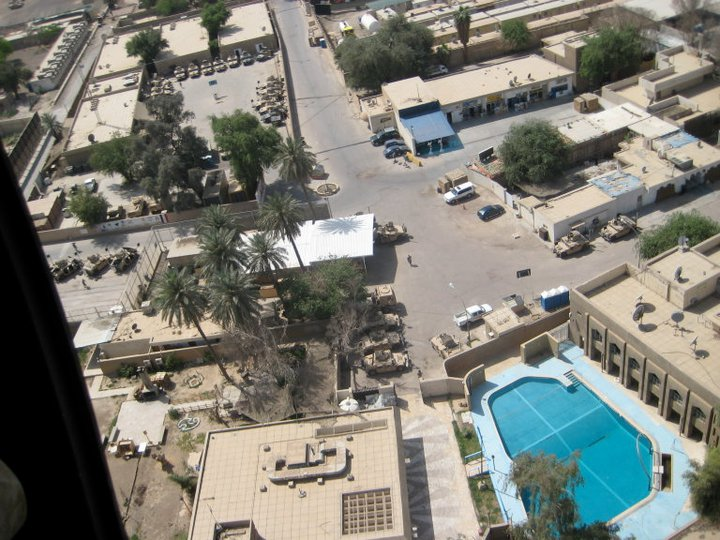

Forward Operating Base Freedom was a small United States Army base located inside the Green Zone of Baghdad, Iraq.

The base was located along the west bank of the Tigris River, immediately east of the 14th of July Bridge. During the Iraq War, FOB Freedom housed one company of soldiers that were assigned to provide motorcade protection for the highest political leaders of Iraq's government. The FOB contained its own small chow hall, gym, and MWR area.

FOB Freedom also housed contractors and dogs of MineTech, a private security firm that provided explosive detection dogs and handlers. Most of the employees of MineTech were citizens of South Africa and Zimbabwe.

A popular base legend was that the compound that would become FOB Freedom was formerly used by Uday Hussein, and that the kennels used to house the MineTech dogs were previously used to house lions, bears, and other animals that were used to torture and execute prisoners.
