= Anah District =

Anah District قضاء عانة
- District
- Location within Iraq
- Coordinates: 34.27071°N 41.81234°E
- Country: Iraq
- Governorates: Al Anbar Governorate
  - Density: 6.079/km^{2} (15.74/sq mi)
- Time zone: UTC+3 (AST)

Anah (Arabic: قضاء عانة) is a district in Al Anbar Governorate, Iraq. It is centred on the town of Anah. As of 2018, it has an estimated population of 31,575.

== Cities ==
- Anah
- Al Rihanih
