= Al-Daur District =

Coordinates: 34.46188°N 43.80792°E

Al-Daur District قضاء الدور
- District
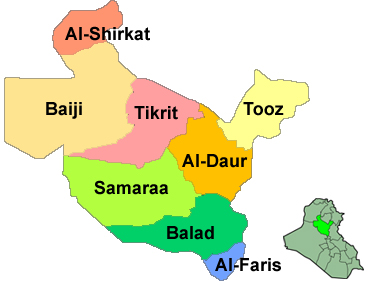
- Interactive map of Al-Daur District
- Country: Iraq
- Governorate: Saladin Governorate
- Seat: Al-Daur
- Time zone: UTC+3 (AST)

Al-Daur District (Arabic: قضاء الدور; also spelled Ad-Dawr) is a district of Saladin Governorate, Iraq.
