= Tikrit District =

Tikrit District قضاء تكريت
- District
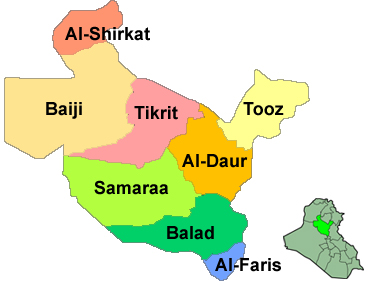
- Interactive map of Tikrit District
- Country: Iraq
- Governorate: Saladin Governorate
- Seat: Tikrit

Population 2024
  - Total: 253,957
- Time zone: UTC+3 (AST)

Tikrit District (Arabic: قضاء تكريت) is a district of Saladin Governorate, Iraq. Its leading city is Tikrit.
