= Ramadi District =

District in Al Anbar Governorate, Iraq

Ramadi District قضاء الرمادي
- District
- Interactive map of Ramadi District
- Country: Iraq
- Governorates: Al Anbar Governorate

Population
  - Total: 590,310
- Time zone: UTC+3 (AST)

Ramadi (Arabic: قضاء الرمادي) is a district in Al Anbar Governorate, Iraq. It is centred on the city of Ramadi.

== Cities ==
- Ramadi (400,000)
- Sajariyah (20,000)
- Hamariyah (15,000)
- Husaibah Al Sharqiah (35,000)
- Albu Faraj (30,000)
- Aljbah (25,000)
