= Al-Musayab District =

Al-Musayab District Arabic: قضاء المسيب
- District
- Location in Iraq
- Coordinates: 32.78333°N 44.31667°E
- Country: Iraq
- Governorates: Babil Governorate
- Time zone: UTC+3 (AST)

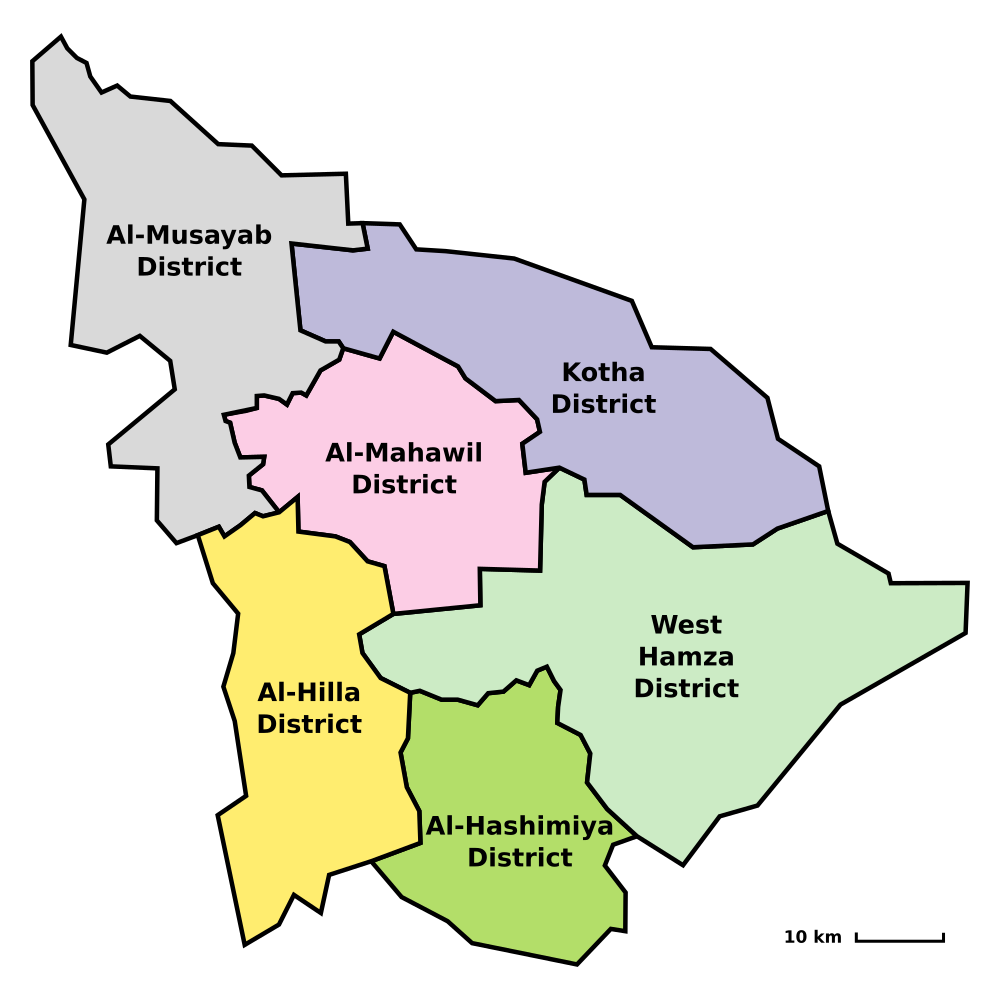
Map of Babil Governorate showing districts

Al-Musayyib (المسيب) is a district in Babil Governorate, Iraq. It is centred on the town of Al Musayyib.

== Cities ==
- Al Musayyib
- Jurf Al Sakhar
