= Kirkush Military Training Base =

Kirkush Military Training Base was a United States Army installation near the city of Balad Ruz in Diyala Governorate, Iraq.

== FOB Caldwell ==
Forward Operating Base Caldwell was named for United States Army Specialist Nathaniel A. Caldwell of Omaha, Nebraska who was killed on May 21, 2003 when the vehicle he was riding in at night rolled over while traveling at excessive speed in Baghdad, Iraq. Caldwell was assigned to the 404th Aviation Support Battalion, 4th Infantry Division, Fort Hood, Texas.

Until the US Army arrived, FOB Caldwell was an abandoned Iraqi military base. Construction had begun in the mid-1980s by the Czechoslovak government and ceased in the late 1980s or early 1990s. The entire facility covers about 100 acres (0.40 km^{2}) and has several medium size groups of buildings called pods. A kilometer outside of Kirkush is a brick factory which has several black smoke stacks about 50 feet (15 m) high.

FOB Caldwell was located in a complex that was within Kirkush Military Training Base (KMTB), Iraq (Mercator Grid Reference System 38SNC 22027 30374) is approximately 70 miles (110 km) east of Baghdad, close to the Iranian border. Kirkush is located some 90 km northeast of Baghdad and 20 km from the Iranian border. Kirkush [33°43'10"N 045°17'24"E ] lies due east of Balad Ruz, Iraq.

=== Military units ===
Several US Army units lived and worked on FOB Caldwell and KMTB as a whole. Units that were located on FOB Caldwell proper included:

- 1-10 CAV, 4th Inf DIV, 309th RAOC and 1-17 FA founded Camp Caldwell in June 2003 and relinquished command to 30th BCT in March 2004
- G Battery 202 ADA, 30th Heavy Brigade Combat Team (United States), Early Warning Team 4, HHB 4-3 ADA 1st Infantry Division (United States), Company B, 279th Signal BN (held it down in 2004)
- 278th Armored Cavalry Regiment (United States)
- 1-32 Cavalry (RSTA)
- 5-73rd Cavalry Regiment (United States) (-) earned the Presidential Unit Citation for operations conducted while assigned to FOB Caldwell
- 2d Squadron, 3d Armored Cavalry Regiment (-) earned the Valorous Unit Award for operations conducted while assigned to FOB Caldwell, November 2007 to October 2008.
- B Btry 2/4 FA, MLRS, December 2007 to September 2008.
- Task Force 3-66, 172nd Infantry Brigade (United States), November 2008 to November 2009 (OIF 08-10) (-) earned the Meritorious Unit Commendation for operations while assigned to FOB Caldwell
- 1st Cavalry Regiment 5th Squadron, Fort Wainwright, Alaska.
- 5th Iraqi Army MiTT
- 14th Combat Engineers 2003
- Garrison Support Unit Jolly Roger, founded 2006
- Logistics Military Assistance Teams (part of Multi-National Security Transition Command – Iraq) (U.S. Air Force/U.S. Army team providing logistics advice to Iraqi base commander)
- 323rd Military Police Company (Toledo, Ohio), 18th Military Police Brigade. Provided installation security June 2003-December 2003 for the training of the first two battalions of the new Iraqi Army
- 1071st Maintenance Company, Michigan National Guard. 2005
- Task Force NCO, Military assistance training team, Fort Lewis, Washington, 2004.
- 1st Squadron, 14th Cavalry Regiment, 3rd Stryker Brigade Combat Team (SBCT), 2nd Infantry Division, 2009–2010. Headquarters & Headquarters Troop (HHT). Support elements as well as an outpost for command with a Quick Reaction Force (QRF). Last to pass the torch to the Iraqi Army.

Coalition Military Training Team (CMATT) Advisors to the Base Operations, Iraqi CG, Base Defense Team 2005-2008 FOB Caldwell was dissolved into the larger KMTB on April 3, 2010 and turned over to the 5th Iraqi Army Division.

== See also ==
- List of United States Military installations in Iraq
