= Tikrit South Air Base =

Former Iraqi Air Force base in Saladin

Tikrit South Air Base FOB Remagen

Location
- Coordinates: 34°31′54″N 043°40′50″E

Location of Tikrit South Air Base, Iraq

Tikrit South Air Base, formerly known as FOB Packhorse and FOB Remagen, is a former Iraqi Air Force base in Salah ad Din Governorate of Iraq. It was captured by U.S.-led Coalition forces during Operation Iraqi Freedom in 2003.

Camp Speicher is located to the north of the base.

== Overview ==
Tikrit South Air Base was an auxiliary air base for the Iraqi Air Force. It had a 9,100-foot runway, a parking ramp and a few support structures. It was attacked by Coalition air forces during Operation Iraqi Freedom with numerous bomb craters visible in the main runway. It was abandoned by the Iraqi Air Force after March 2003.

The United States Army established Forward Operating Base Packhorse at the airfield after March 2003. FOB Packhorse was renamed to FOB Speicher after the 4ID turned the FOB over to the 1st ID in 2004. In 2006, FOB Remagen was handed over from Coalition Forces to the Iraqi Army.

As of 2011, the air field appeared to be active as a drone base as viewed in current aerial imagery.

Name	Death Date	Category	Incident City
Nelson, Lex S.	12-Dec-05	NON-HOSTILE	FOB Remagen/Tikrit
