= 2004 Forward Operating Base Marez bombing =

2004 Islamist attack on a US base in Mosul, Iraq

Coordinates: 36.302433°N 43.122342°E

Attack on Forward Operating Base Marez
- Part of Iraqi insurgency (2003–2006) in Iraqi insurgency (2003–2011)
- Location: Mosul, Iraq
- Date: December 21, 2004; 21 years ago
- Target: Forward Operating Base Marez
- Attack type: suicide bombing
- Deaths: 14 U.S. soldiers 4 U.S. civilians 4 Iraqi soldiers
- Injuries: 72 (including 51 U.S. soldiers)
- Perpetrator: Army of Ansar al-Sunna
- Motive: Occupation of Iraq

The Forward Operating Base Marez bombing took place on December 21, 2004. Fourteen U.S. soldiers, four U.S. citizen Halliburton employees, and four Iraqi soldiers allied with the U.S. military were killed by a suicide bomber in a dining hall at the Forward Operating Base next to the main U.S. military airfield at Mosul.

== Pentagon report ==
The Pentagon reported that 72 other personnel were injured in the attack carried out by a suicide bomber wearing an explosive vest and the uniform of the Iraqi security services. The Islamist insurgent group Army of Ansar al-Sunna (partly evolved from Ansar al-Islam) released an internet message taking credit for the attack. The bomber entered the mess tent and approached a large group of U.S. soldiers, detonating himself and killing 22 people. It was the single deadliest suicide attack against the US military in Iraq.

== After attack ==
Weeks before the attack, soldiers from the base intercepted a document that mentioned a proposal for a massive "Beirut"-type attack on U.S. forces. The reference was apparently to the 1983 Beirut barracks bombing in which 241 U.S. service members were killed. Following the discovery of the papers, commanders at the base — which is about three miles (5 km) south of Mosul and is used by both U.S. troops and the interim Iraqi National Guard forces — ratcheted up already tight security.

Ansar al-Sunnah said the suicide bomber was a 24-year-old man from Mosul who worked at the base for two months and had provided information about the base to the group.

The AP reported that the bomber was a twenty-year-old medical student from Saudi Arabia. A US Army report identified a different Saudi national as the suicide bomber and said he got help from Iraqi troops working at the base.

== The dead ==
- Fallen soldiers from 133rd Engineer Battalion (Maine); Sergeant Thomas Dostie of Somerville, Maine, Sergeant Lynn R. Poulin Sr. of Freedom, Maine
- Fallen soldier from 1st Battalion, 5th Infantry Regiment "Bobcats", Ft Lewis, WA); SSG Julian S. Melo
- Fallen soldiers from Deuce Four Infantry (1/24- Ft Lewis, WA); CPT William Jacobsen, SSG Robert Johnson, SPC Johnathon Castro, PFC Lionel Ayro
- Fallen Soldiers from C276 Eng (Virginia National Guard, West Point, VA); Sgt Nick Mason, Sgt David Ruhren
- Fallen Soldier from 2nd Squadron, 14th Cavalry Regiment; SSG Darren Vankomen
- Fallen Sailor from NMCB-7; Chief Petty Officer Joel Baldwin
- Fallen Soldier from US Army Intelligence and Security Command, Sergeant Major Robert Daniel Odell
- Fallen Soldier from 705th Ordnance Company; Specialist Cory Hewitt
- Fallen Soldier from 2nd Battalion, 390th Infantry Regiment SFC; Paul Karpowich
- Iraqi Army Chief Warrant Officer Majdee Yousef Aziz, Iraqi Army 1st Lt. Mushtag Satar Jabar, Iraqi Army Sgt. Ahmad Hashem Mahdi, Iraqi National Guardsman Sherzad Kamo Bro

== See also ==
- Battle of Mosul - Iraq War
- Iraq War
