= McHenry Township =

McHenry Township may refer to:

- McHenry Township, McHenry County, Illinois
- McHenry Township, Foster County, North Dakota, in Foster County, North Dakota
- McHenry Township, Pennsylvania
