= McHenry Hollow =

Valley in Missouri, United States

Coordinates: 37°15′25″N 91°27′47″W

McHenry Hollow is a valley in Shannon County in the U.S. state of Missouri. It is a tributary to Spring Valley Creek.

McHenry Hollow has the name of the local McHenry family.
