= Baiji District =

Baiji District قضاء بيجي
- District
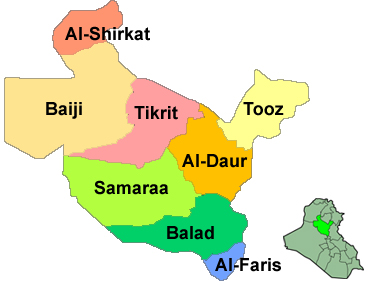
- Interactive map of Baiji District
- Country: Iraq
- Governorate: Saladin Governorate
- Seat: Baiji
- Time zone: UTC+3 (AST)

Baiji District (Arabic: قضاء بيجي) is a district of Saladin Governorate, Iraq. Its population was estimated to be 221,666 in 2018.
