= Taji District =

- District
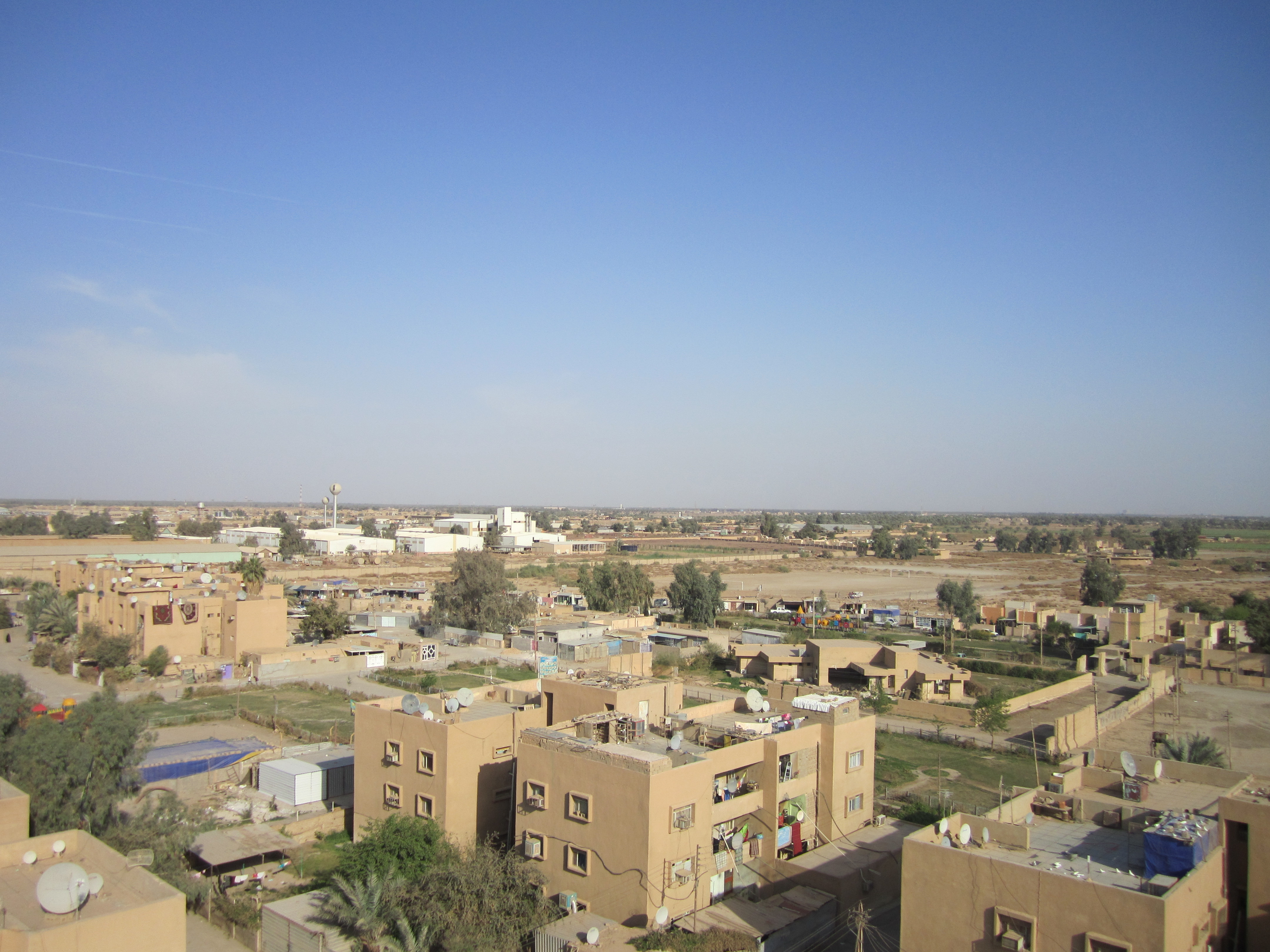
- Interactive map of Taji District
- Country: Iraq
- Governorate: Baghdad Governorate

Population (2017)
  - Total: 150،855
- Time zone: UTC+3 (AST)

Taji District is a district of the Baghdad Governorate, Iraq.
