= Forward operating base =

Secured forward military position

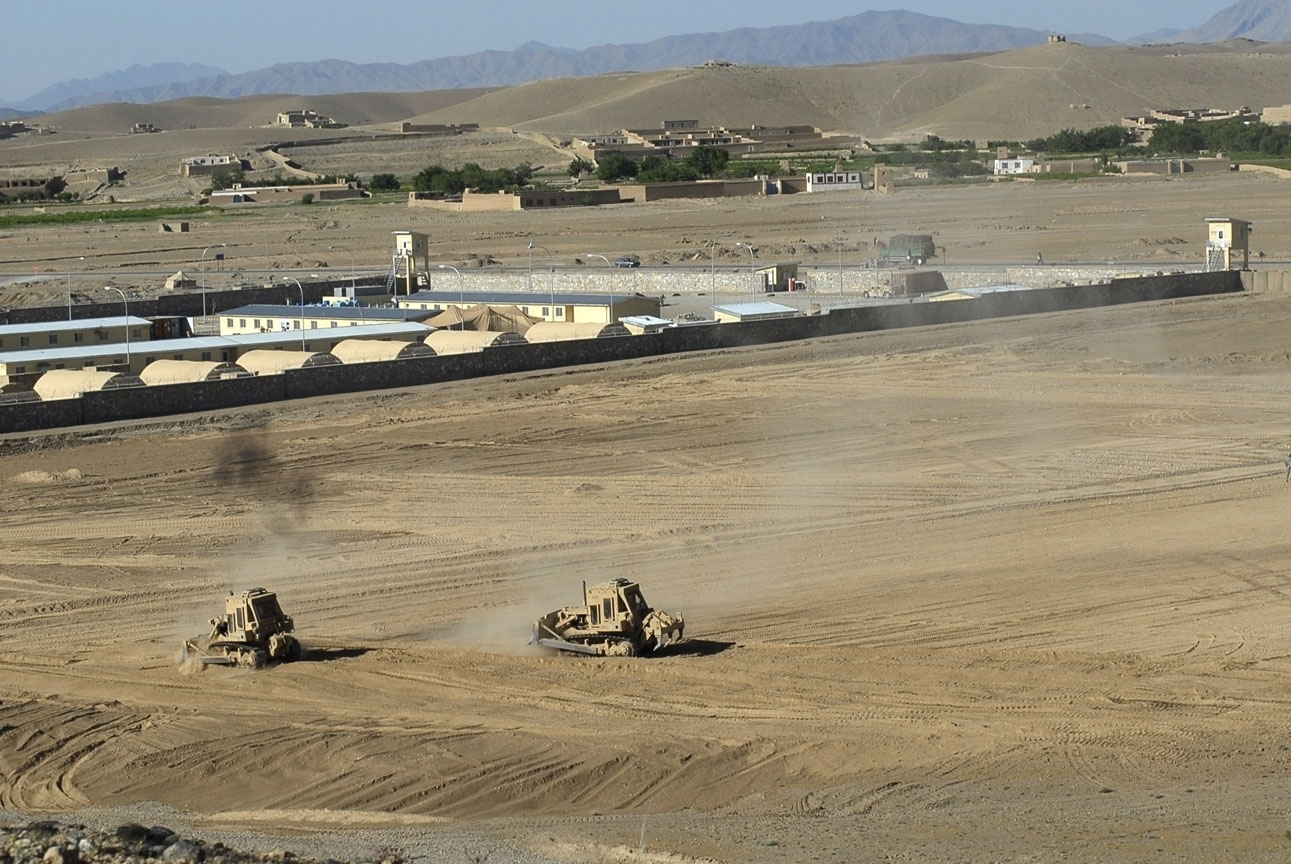
Forward Operating Base Logar, Afghanistan (2007)

A forward operating base (FOB) is any secured forward operational level military position, commonly a military base, that is used to support strategic goals and tactical objectives. A FOB may contain an airbase, hospital, machine shop, and other logistical facilities. The base may be used for an extended period of time. FOBs are traditionally supported by main operating bases that are required to provide backup support to them. An FOB also improves reaction time to local areas as opposed to having all troops on the main operating base.

== Description ==
In its most basic form, a forward operating base consists of a ring of barbed wire around a position with a fortified entry control point, or ECP. An ECP is a controlled entry and exit point of the FOB and typically has positions to protect personnel against personnel-borne improvised explosive devices (PBIED) and vehicle-borne improvised explosive devices (VBIED), plus blast mitigation with standoff protection.

More advanced FOBs include an assembly of berms, concrete barriers, gates, guard towers, pillboxes and bunkers and other force protection infrastructure. They are often built from Hesco bastions.

== Bases in Iraq ==
- FOB Abu Ghraib
- FOB Al Asad
- FOB Caldwell
- FOB Carpenter
- FOB Courage
- FOB Danger
- FOB Falcon
- FOB Echo
- FOB Grizzly
- FOB Haditha Dam
- FOB Iskandariyah
- FOB Kalsu
- FOB Loyalty
- FOB Marez
- FOB MacKenzie
- FOB Q-West
- FOB Speicher

== See also ==
- Advance airfield
- Advanced Landing Ground
- Fire support base
- Forward Operating Site
- Loss of Strength Gradient
- Main Operating Base
- Naval outlying landing field
- Satellite airfield
- List of established military terms
