= 1st Air Cavalry Brigade =

Basic aviation formation of the 1st Cavalry Division, US Army

Combat Aviation Brigade, 1st Cavalry Division
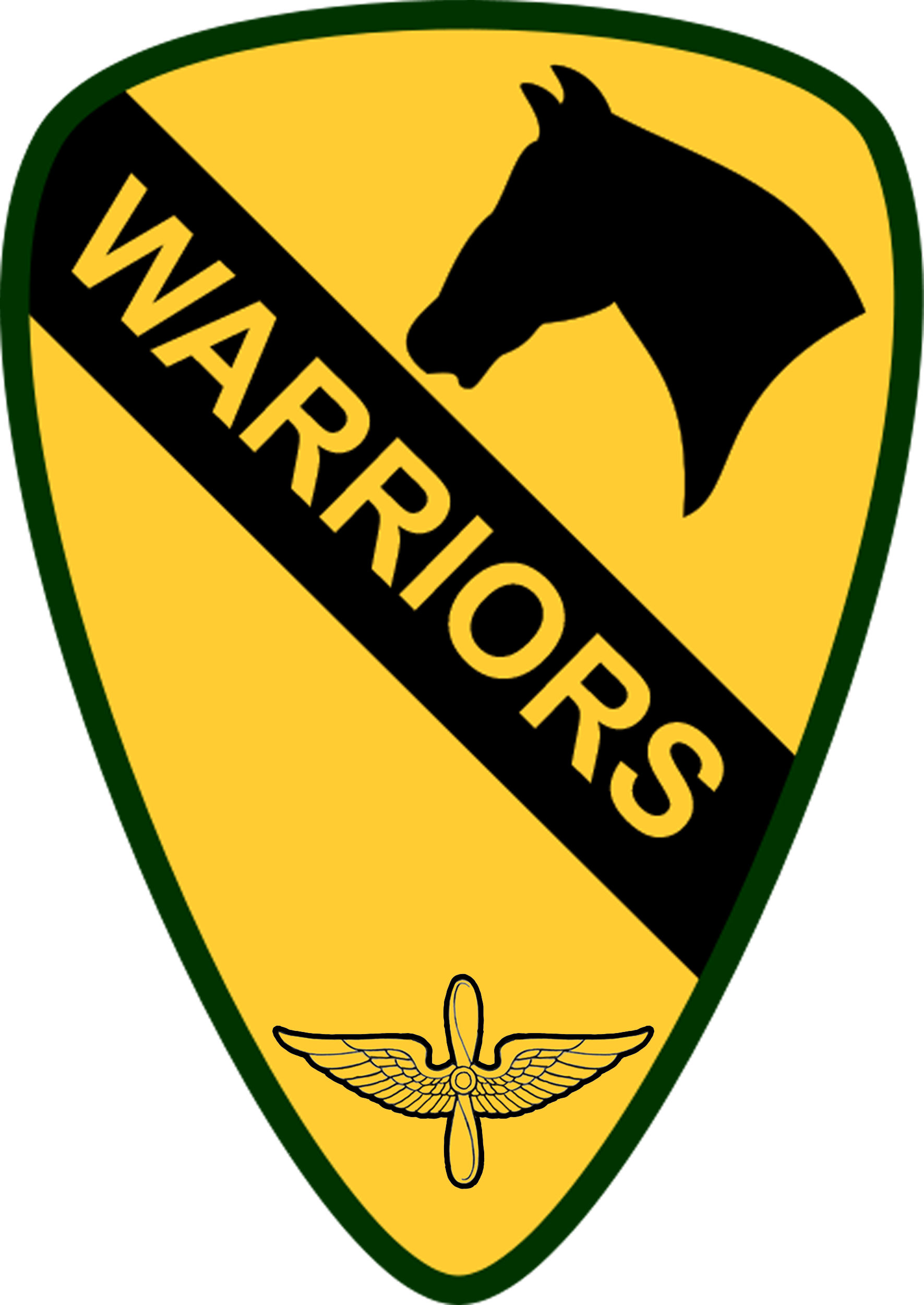
- Active: 1984–present
- Country: United States
- Allegiance: United States Army
- Size: Brigade
- Part of: 1st Cavalry Division
- Garrison/HQ: Fort Hood, Texas

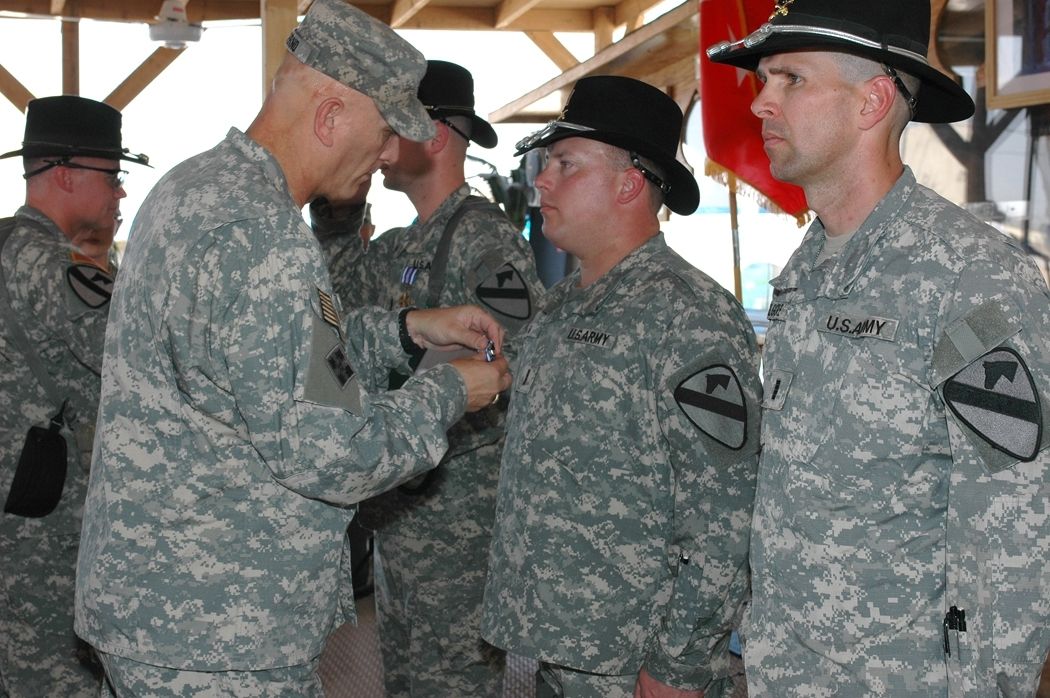
LTG Ray Odierno presents Distinguished Flying Crosses to soldiers of the division in Iraq

The Combat Aviation Brigade, 1st Cavalry Division is a divisional aviation brigade of the United States Army. It was activated on 16 September 1984.

== Current structure ==
The brigade is composed of:

- Headquarters and Headquarters Company (HHC)
- 1st Battalion, 227th Aviation Regiment "Attack"
- 2nd Battalion, 227th Aviation Regiment "Lobos"
- 3rd Battalion, 227th Aviation Regiment "SpearHead"
- 7th Squadron, 17th Cavalry Regiment "PaleHorse"
- 615th Aviation Support Battalion (615th ASB) "Cold Steel"

== History ==
=== 1960s ===
The history of combat aviation in the 1st Cavalry Division goes back to 1963, when the Army began to gather helicopters into the 11th Aviation Group, 11th Air Assault Division (Test) at Fort Benning, Georgia, to test the airmobile concept. The 11th Aviation Group included the 227th, 228th and 229th Aviation Battalions. In 1965, the assets of the 11th AAD and the 2d Infantry Division were merged to form the 1st Cavalry Division (Airmobile). This involved a simultaneous transfer of the swapping of the colors of the 1st Cavalry Division, then stationed in Korea, with the 2nd Infantry Division. On 1 August 1965, the 1st Cavalry Division (Airmobile) was sent to Vietnam. Aviators participated in 14 campaigns and received seven decorations during its seven years of duty in Vietnam. The first Army aviator to be awarded the Medal of Honor in the Vietnam War was a member of the 227th Aviation Battalion.

Following its return from Vietnam, the 1st Cavalry Division was reorganized as an experimental TRICAP (Triple Capability) Division with a heavy (armor-mech) brigade, an airmobile brigade and an aviation brigade. This configuration was deemed unworkable and the division was reorganized as a standard heavy division. The division's aviation element consisted of the 227th Aviation Battalion. The colors of the 11th Aviation Group were separated from the division after the war and assigned to Germany by reflagging an existing aviation group already stationed there.

According to the U.S. Army Center of Military History, the lineage of the Combat Aviation Brigade, 1st Cavalry Division began when it was constituted on 1 September 1984 in the Regular Army as Headquarters and Headquarters Troop, Cavalry Brigade, 1st Cavalry Division, and activated at Fort Hood, Texas. It was reorganized and redesignated on 16 October 1996 as Headquarters and Headquarters Company, Aviation Brigade, 1st Cavalry Division.

The 227th Aviation Regiment itself appears to have been established on 16 July 1987.

=== Gulf War ===
In late 1990, the brigade deployed overseas to Saudi Arabia, where the unit postured for combat in Operation Desert Shield. On 25 February 1991, with the onset of Operation Desert Storm, the brigade conducted a raid as a part of the 1st Cavalry Division's deception plan to throw Iraqi forces off guard. The units of the brigade would serve as the vanguard of the division's movement north to cut off a retreating Iraqi Republican Guard division at Basra. In late spring of 1991, the units of the brigade redeployed to Fort Hood and their home stations.

=== Other operations ===
In January 1993 the brigade deployed its command and control aircraft to Kuwait. With 48 hours' notice, the brigade deployed to Somalia, where it flew over 500 hours of combat missions. In Bosnia, in 1999, the brigade deployed to Operation Joint Forge. During this operation, units flew in the Balkans in support of Stabilization Force 4.These missions encompassed a wide range of tasks, including multi-national general support, airborne command and control operations, and air movement operations.

=== Iraq War ===
With the onset of Operation Iraqi Freedom in March 2003, the brigade deployed the 1st Battalion, 227th Aviation to Iraq to exercise their Longbow Apaches in combat operations for the first time. There, they assisted in setting the conditions for the defeat of the Iraqi Army and the liberation of Baghdad. In the early hours of 24 March 2003, Apache Longbows of the 1st Cavalry Division, fought a fierce battle with units of Iraq's Republican Guard Medina Division between the cities of Karbala and Al Hilah, south of Baghdad.

During March 2004 the brigade deployed to Operation Iraqi Freedom II as part of Task Force Baghdad. The brigade fought throughout the Baghdad Area of Operations and in Fallujah, An Najaf, Al Kut, Karbala, and Balad. The brigade flew over 70,000 hours and was recognized with 84 awards for valor including the first Army Aviator to receive the Distinguished Service Cross, a Silver Star and seven Distinguished Flying Crosses.

In 2006 the brigade deployed to Taji, Iraq in support of Operation Iraqi Freedom 06-08. At the end of January 2007, the brigade participated in the Battle of An Najif, in which a 4-227, AH-64D was shot down in combat operations. One week later a 1-227, AH-64D was also shot down.

The brigade was deployed to Taji, Iraq again in 2009 in support of Operation Iraqi Freedom, 09-11.

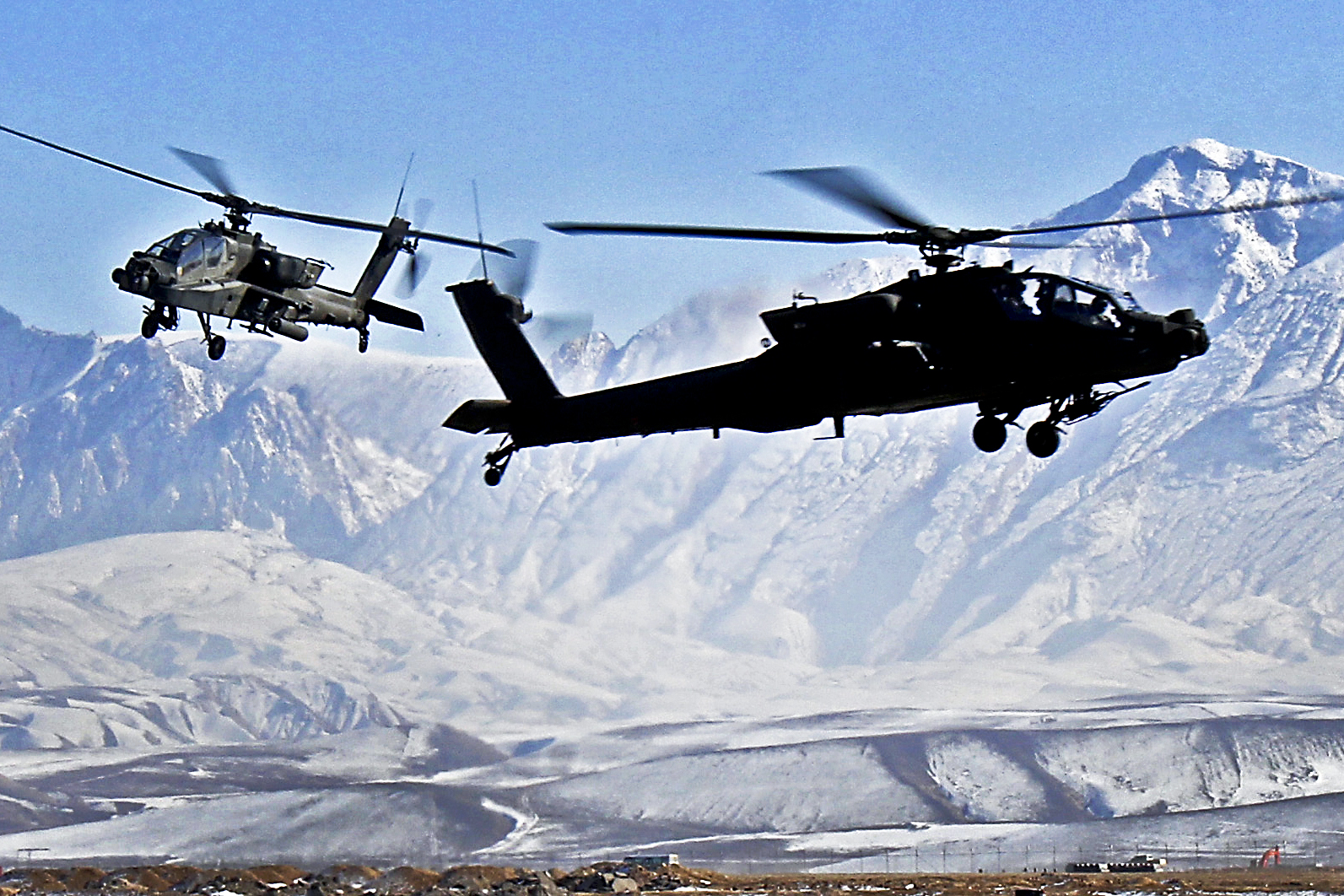
1st Air Cavalry helicopter in Afghanistan

In June 2011 the brigade deployed to Afghanistan and returned starting in April 2012 after being replaced by 12th Combat Aviation Brigade from Germany

==== Events of 12 July 2007 ====
Leaked gun-camera footage of the event

On 12 July 2007, after several skirmishes in the area, two AH-64 Apache helicopters reportedly of the Air Weapons Team of the Combat Aviation Brigade observed a group of people milling around on a street in Baghdad, including what appeared to be two armed, and ten unarmed men. They reported all in the group to be armed, presumed them to be Iraqi insurgents, and fired on them, as well as a van seeking to pick up the wounded and a man severely wounded and incapacitated by the first attack. A total of 12 people were killed including Reuters journalist Noor-Eldeen and his driver, Saeed Chmagh. Two children were also severely injured.

The attacks received worldwide media coverage following the leaking of 39 minutes of classified cockpit video footage in 2010. The Apache crews involved were criticized for their decision to attack a largely unarmed group, for re-attacking the wounded, attacking the unarmed men that came to the aid of the wounded, and for the callous language used by the Apache crews occasionally during the attacks.

=== Peacetime operations ===
After the devastation caused by Hurricane Katrina in September 2005, the brigade deployed 2nd Battalion, 227th Aviation Regiment, elements of 615th Aviation Support Battalion and the brigade command team to Louisiana to support disaster relief operations in New Orleans. Immediately upon redeployment, 2-227 AVN, 615th ASB and the brigade command team redeployed to East Texas to assist relief efforts in the wake of Hurricane Rita. Shortly after returning from the hurricane relief effort, the 2nd Battalion, 227th Aviation Regiment and 615th ASB were called upon to support a humanitarian aid mission in the aftermath of the October 2005 earthquake that devastated northern Pakistan.
