= 2016 Balad attack =

2016 terrorist attack

- Part of the Iraqi Civil War (2014–2017)
- Location of Saladin Governorate in Iraq
- Location: Balad, Saladin Governorate, Iraq
- Date: 8 July 2016
- Attack type: Suicide bombings, mass shooting
- Weapons: Bomb; Rocket-propelled grenade
- Deaths: 36
- Injuries: Unknown
- Perpetrator: Islamic State of Iraq and the Levant

2016 Balad attack was attack on the shrine of seven Dujai in Balad, Iraq on Friday, July 8, 2016 in which 36 people were killed.

== Background ==
The attack came as the United Nations issued warnings of the possibility of renewed sectarian fighting after the invasion of Iraq in 2003.It followed two bombings in the vicinity of the shrine of Sayed Mohammad in the southern Saladin Governorate, north of Baghdad.

It was suspected that the ISIS terrorist organisation targeted the shrine with rocket-propelled mortars, followed by three suicide bombers, two of which detonated in a market near the shrine.
