= Army Reserve Aviation Command =

Headquarters command for all aviation assets in the U.S. Army Reserve

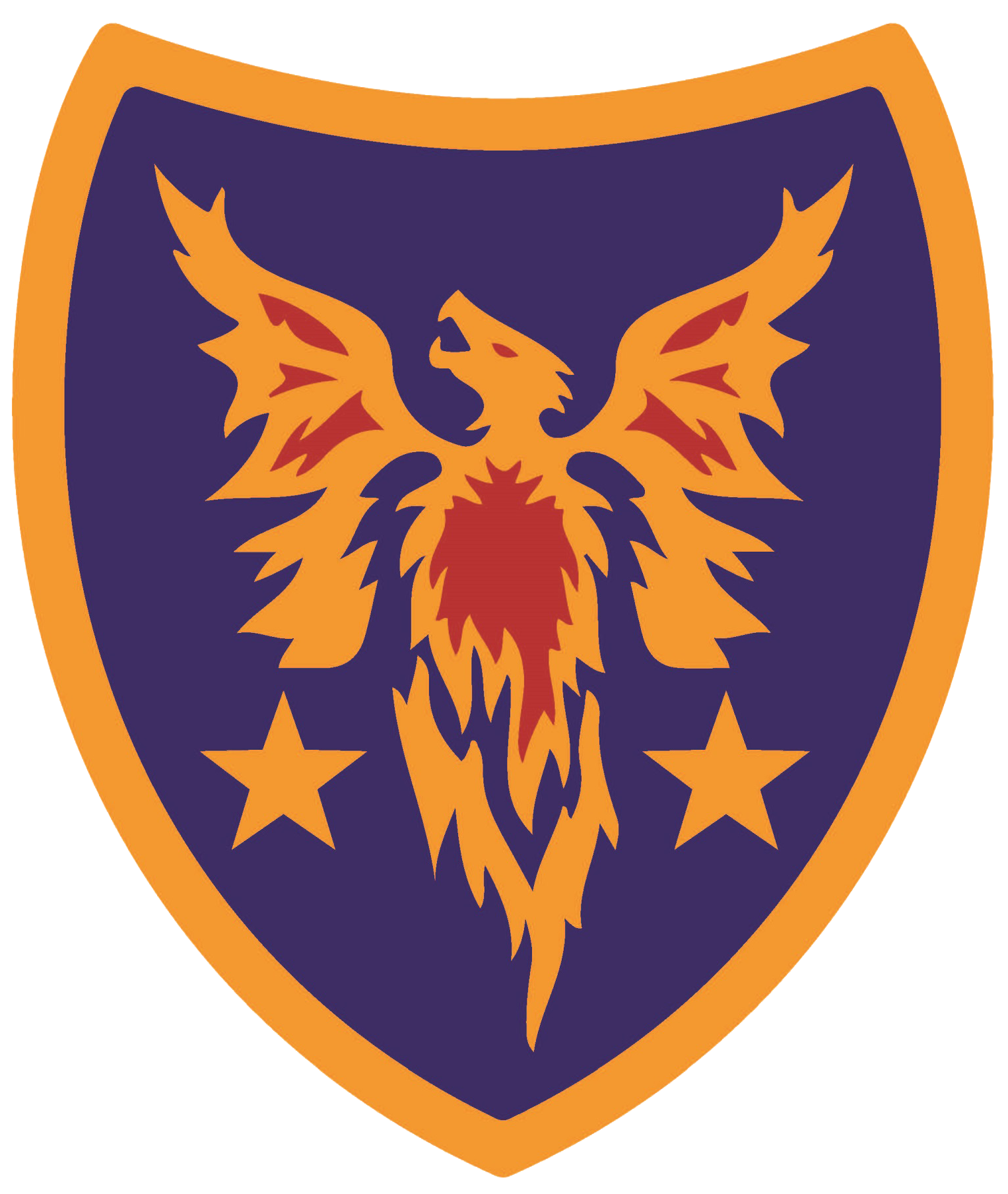
- ARAC Shoulder Sleeve Insignia
- Active: 16 September 2016 – present
- Country: United States
- Branch: United States Army Reserve
- Type: Composite Command
- Role: Control of all Army Reserve aviation assets.
- Size: Approximately 4,400 Soldiers, 600 civilians, 230 aircraft in 12 states
- Part of: United States Army Reserve Command
- Garrison/HQ: Fort Knox, Kentucky
- Motto: "Rise Above"

Commanders
- Commanding General: Brig. Gen. Patrick L. Pollak
- Command Sergeant Major: CSM Robert A. Bennett, Jr.
- Deputy Commanding General: Col. Clinton "Clint" S. Williams
- Command Chief Warrant Officer: CW5 Jason R. Payne

Insignia
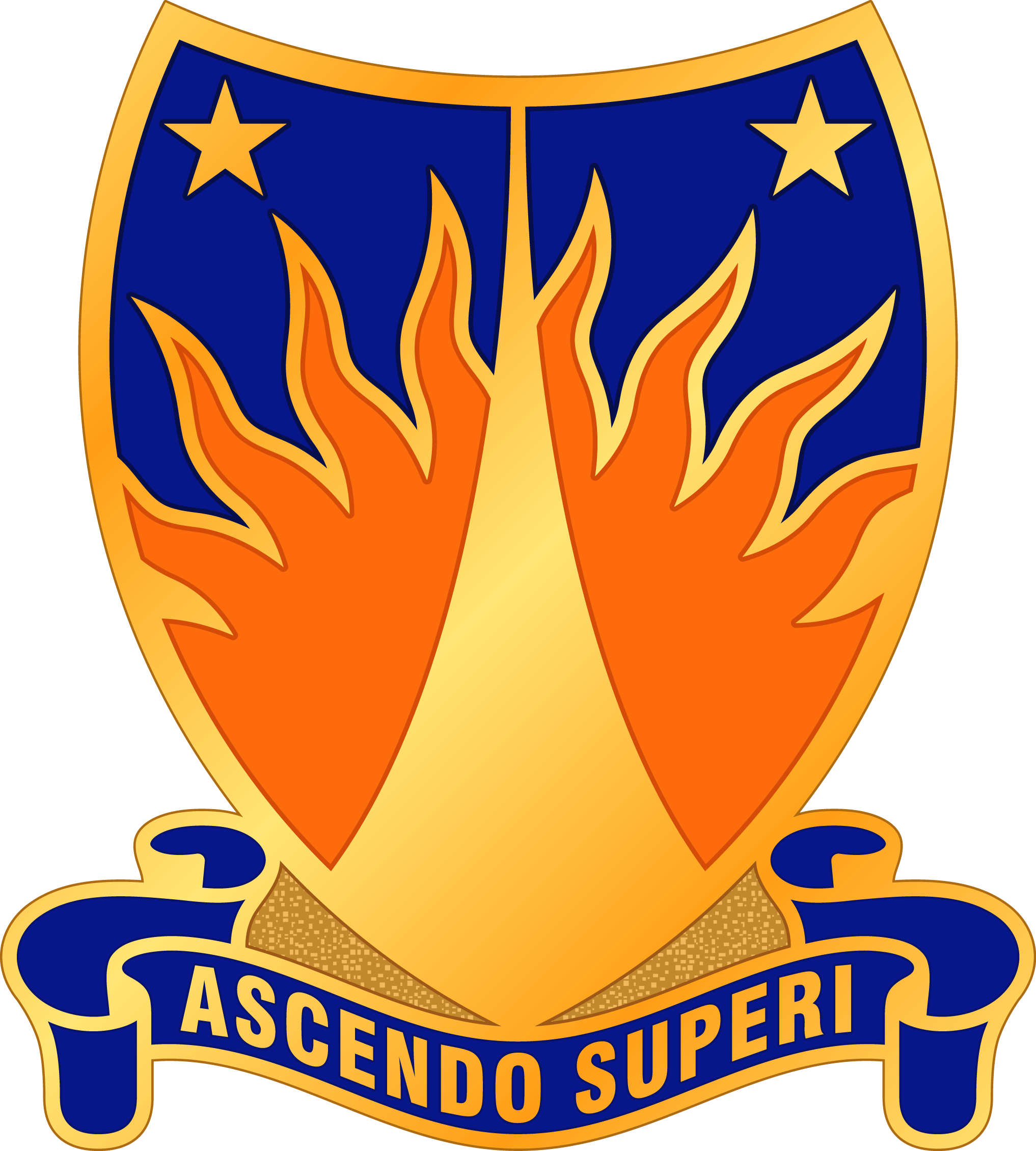
- The command's distinctive unit insignia

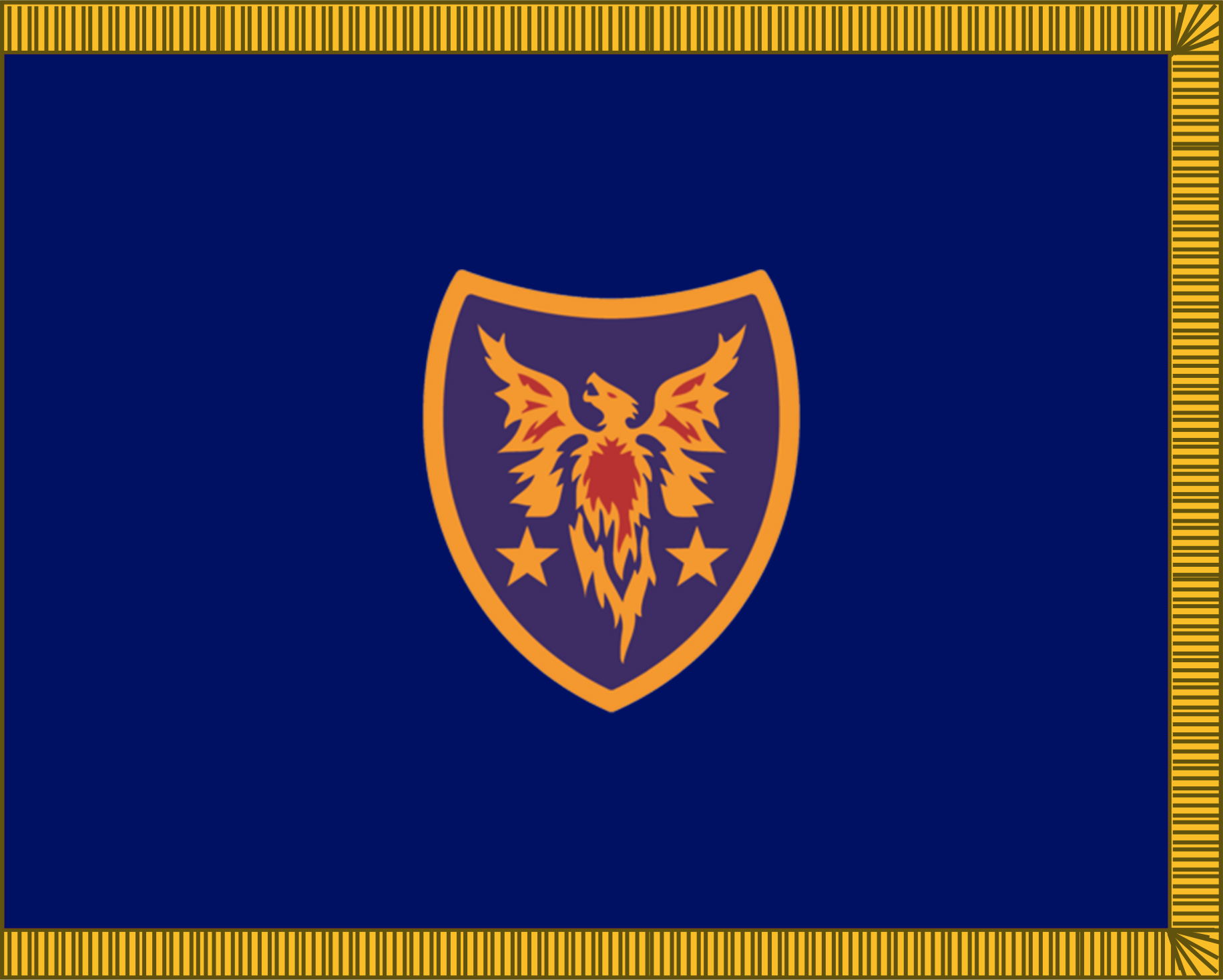
- US Army Reserve Aviation Command Flag

The Army Reserve Aviation Command (ARAC) is the headquarters command for all aviation assets in the United States Army Reserve. It is located at Fort Knox, Kentucky and is commanded by a brigadier general. It is a subordinate functional command of the United States Army Reserve Command.

The command consists of approximately 4,400 soldiers and 600 civilians, with 230 aircraft at facilities in 12 states. The command's assets provide air assault, air movement, air traffic services airfield management, aeromedical evacuation, combat aviation brigade reinforcement, theater aviation support, and coordination of aviation staging and onward movement to theater. It supports all Federal Emergency Management Agency regions within the United States to respond to emergencies. The command was activated in its current form on 16 September 2016.

== Units in January 2026 ==
As of January 2026 the command consists of the following units:

- Army Reserve Aviation Command, at Fort Knox (KY)
  - Headquarters and Headquarters Company, Army Reserve Aviation Command, at Fort Knox (KY)
  - 11th Expeditionary Combat Aviation Brigade, at Fort Carson (CO)
    - Headquarters and Headquarters Company, 11th Expeditionary Combat Aviation Brigade, at Fort Carson (CO)
    - 6th Battalion (Fixed Wing), 52nd Aviation Regiment, at Los Alamitos Army Airfield (CA)
      - Headquarters and Headquarters Company, 6th Battalion (Fixed Wing), 52nd Aviation Regiment, at Los Alamitos Army Airfield (CA)
      - Company A, 6th Battalion (Fixed Wing), 52nd Aviation Regiment, at Naval Air Station Joint Reserve Base Fort Worth (TX)
      - Company B, 6th Battalion (Fixed Wing), 52nd Aviation Regiment, at Fort Knox (KY)
      - Company C, 6th Battalion (Fixed Wing), 52nd Aviation Regiment, at Los Alamitos Army Airfield (CA)
        - Detachment 1, Company C, 6th Battalion (Fixed Wing), 52nd Aviation Regiment, at Peterson Space Force Base (CO)
    - 7th Battalion (General Support Aviation), 158th Aviation Regiment, at Fort Hood (TX)
      - Headquarters and Headquarters Company, 7th Battalion (General Support Aviation), 158th Aviation Regiment, at Fort Hood (TX)
      - Company A (CAC), 7th Battalion (General Support Aviation), 158th Aviation Regiment, at Fort Hood (TX)
      - Company B (Heavy Lift), 7th Battalion (General Support Aviation), 158th Aviation Regiment, at New Century AirCenter (KS)
      - Company C (MEDEVAC), 7th Battalion (General Support Aviation), 158th Aviation Regiment, at Fort Carson (CO)
      - Company D (AVUM), 7th Battalion (General Support Aviation), 158th Aviation Regiment, at New Century AirCenter (KS)
        - Detachment 1, Company D (AVUM), 7th Battalion (General Support Aviation), 158th Aviation Regiment, at Fort Carson (CO)
        - Detachment 2, Company D (AVUM), 7th Battalion (General Support Aviation), 158th Aviation Regiment, at Los Alamitos Army Airfield (CA)
      - Company E (Forward Support), 7th Battalion (General Support Aviation), 158th Aviation Regiment, at Fort Hood (TX)
        - Detachment 1, Company E (Forward Support), 7th Battalion (General Support Aviation), 158th Aviation Regiment, at Fort Carson (CO)
        - Detachment 2, Company E (Forward Support), 7th Battalion (General Support Aviation), 158th Aviation Regiment, at Los Alamitos Army Airfield (CA)
      - Company F (ATS), 7th Battalion (General Support Aviation), 158th Aviation Regiment, at Fort Carson (CO)
      - Company G (MEDEVAC), 7th Battalion (General Support Aviation), 158th Aviation Regiment, at Los Alamitos Army Airfield (CA)
    - 90th Aviation Support Battalion, at Naval Air Station Joint Reserve Base Fort Worth (TX)
      - Headquarters and Headquarters Company, 90th Aviation Support Battalion, at Naval Air Station Joint Reserve Base Fort Worth (TX)
      - Company A, 90th Aviation Support Battalion, at Naval Air Station Joint Reserve Base Fort Worth (TX)
      - Company B, 90th Aviation Support Battalion, at Naval Air Station Joint Reserve Base Fort Worth (TX)
      - Company C, 90th Aviation Support Battalion, at Naval Air Station Joint Reserve Base Fort Worth (TX)
  - 244th Expeditionary Combat Aviation Brigade, at Fort Knox (KY)
    - Headquarters and Headquarters Company, 244th Expeditionary Combat Aviation Brigade, at Fort Knox (KY)
    - 5th Battalion (General Support Aviation), 159th Aviation Regiment, at Joint Base Langley–Eustis (VA)
      - Headquarters and Headquarters Company, 5th Battalion (General Support Aviation), 159th Aviation Regiment, at Fort Eustis (VA)
      - Company A (CAC), 5th Battalion (General Support Aviation), 159th Aviation Regiment, at Army Aviation Support Facility Clearwater (FL)
      - Company B (Heavy Lift), 5th Battalion (General Support Aviation), 159th Aviation Regiment, at Fort Eustis (VA)
      - Company C (MEDEVAC), 5th Battalion (General Support Aviation), 159th Aviation Regiment, at Fort Knox (KY)
      - Company D (AVUM), 5th Battalion (General Support Aviation), 159th Aviation Regiment, at Fort Eustis (VA)
        - Detachment 1, Company D (AVUM), 5th Battalion (General Support Aviation), 159th Aviation Regiment, at Army Aviation Support Facility Clearwater (FL)
        - Detachment 2, Company D (AVUM), 5th Battalion (General Support Aviation), 159th Aviation Regiment, at Fort Knox (KY)
      - Company E (Forward Support), 5th Battalion (General Support Aviation), 159th Aviation Regiment, at Fort Eustis (VA)
        - Detachment 1, Company E (Forward Support), 5th Battalion (General Support Aviation), 159th Aviation Regiment, at Army Aviation Support Facility Clearwater (FL)
        - Detachment 2, Company E (Forward Support), 5th Battalion (General Support Aviation), 159th Aviation Regiment, at Fort Knox (KY)
      - Company F (ATS), 5th Battalion (General Support Aviation), 159th Aviation Regiment, at Fort Knox (KY)
      - Company G (MEDEVAC), 5th Battalion (General Support Aviation), 159th Aviation Regiment, at Army Aviation Support Facility Clearwater (FL)
    - 2nd Battalion (Fixed Wing), 228th Aviation Regiment, at Joint Base McGuire-Dix-Lakehurst (NJ)
      - Headquarters and Headquarters Company, 2nd Battalion (Fixed Wing), 228th Aviation Regiment, at Joint Base McGuire-Dix-Lakehurst (NJ)
      - Company A, 2nd Battalion (Fixed Wing), 228th Aviation Regiment, at Joint Base McGuire-Dix-Lakehurst (NJ)
      - Company B, 2nd Battalion (Fixed Wing), 228th Aviation Regiment, at Dobbins Air Reserve Base (GA)
        - Detachment 1, Company B, 2nd Battalion (Fixed Wing), 228th Aviation Regiment, at Fort Rucker (AL)
      - Company C, 2nd Battalion (Fixed Wing), 228th Aviation Regiment, at Pope Field (NC)
    - 8th Battalion (Assault), 229th Aviation Regiment, at Fort Knox (KY)
      - Headquarters and Headquarters Company, 8th Battalion (Assault), 229th Aviation Regiment, at Fort Knox (KY)
      - Company A, 8th Battalion (Assault), 229th Aviation Regiment, at Fort Knox (KY)
      - Company B, 8th Battalion (Assault), 229th Aviation Regiment, at Fort Knox (KY)
      - Company C, 8th Battalion (Assault), 229th Aviation Regiment, at Fort Knox (KY)
      - Company D (AVUM), 8th Battalion (Assault), 229th Aviation Regiment, at Fort Knox (KY)
      - Company E (Forward Support), 8th Battalion (Assault), 229th Aviation Regiment, at Fort Knox (KY)
  - Army Aviation Support Facility Carson, at Fort Carson (CO)
  - Army Aviation Support Facility Carswell, in Fort Worth (TX)
  - Army Aviation Support Facility Hood, at Fort Hood (TX)
  - Army Aviation Support Facility Clearwater, at Clearwater (FL)
  - Army Aviation Support Facility Conroe, at Conroe (TX)
  - Army Aviation Support Facility Dix, at Joint Base McGuire–Dix–Lakehurst (NJ)
  - Army Aviation Support Facility Eustis, at Fort Eustis (VA)
  - Army Aviation Support Facility Knox, at Fort Knox (KY)
  - Army Aviation Support Facility Lewis, at Gray Army Airfield (WA)
  - Army Aviation Support Facility Bragg, at Fort Bragg (NC)
  - Army Aviation Support Facility Los Alamitos, at Los Alamitos Army Airfield (CA)
  - Army Aviation Support Facility Rucker, at Fort Rucker (AL)
  - Army Aviation Support Facility Olathe, at New Century AirCenter (KS)

Abbreviations: CAC — Command Aviation Company; MEDEVAC — Medical evacuation; AVUM — Aviation Unit Maintenance; ATS — Air Traffic Services

The 1st Battalion, 158th Aviation Regiment (Assault), which was based at Army Aviation Support Facility Conroe in Texas, is disbanding and will deactivate on 15 September 2026. The Army Reserve Aviation also includes Company A (Command Aviation Company), based at Fort Bragg (NC), and Company F (ATS), based at Gray Army Airfield (WA), of the 2nd Battalion, 135th Aviation Regiment (General Support Aviation).
