= Battle of Pacora River Bridge =

Battle during Operation Just Cause

- Part of the United States invasion of Panama and Operation Nifty Package
- Battle of Pacora River Bridge (Panama)
Date	20 December 1989
Location	Pacora River Bridge, Panama 9°06′06.4″N 79°16′38.5″W
Result	American victory

Belligerents
United States	Panama

Commanders and leaders
(United States) Maj. Kevin M. Higgins (United States) Maj. Gilberto Perez (Reinforcements)	(Panama) Unknown

Units involved
(United States) US Army Special Forces: Task Force BLACK; 7th Special Forces Group (Airborne); 3rd Battalion; 1st Battalion; (United States) US Air Force Special Operations: Task Force BLACK; 1st Special Operations Wing	Panama Defense Forces: Battalion 2000

Strength
24 Green Berets; 3 UH-60s 2 AC-130s	~30 troops 1 V-300 Mk.II; 2 V-150s; 7+ trucks

Casualties and losses
None	4 killed 1 wounded 17 captured 3 armored vehicles captured 4+ large trucks destroyed 1 pick-up truck destroyed

The Battle of Pacora River Bridge took place as an opening action of the United States invasion of Panama and was fought between the United States Special Forces (commonly referred to as the Green Berets) with air support from the 1st Special Operations Wing of the United States Air Force and the Panama Defense Forces Battalion 2000. The major action of the battle lasted roughly 5 hours through the night of the 20th, and was a resounding U.S. victory, preventing PDF forces coming from Fort Cimarron from intervening in U.S. military actions in Panama City to the west of the bridge.

== Background ==
Both the 7th SFG (A) and the 1st Special Operations Wing were part of Task Force BLACK, which was activated on December 18, 1989 and was under the command of Col. Robert C. Jacobelly. Leading up to the time of the invasion (referred to as H-hour), the 7th SFG (A) was transported to Albrook AFB. The first mission for the 7th SFG (A) was for Company B of the 3rd Battalion and was a reconnaissance mission to observe the movements of Battalion 2000 at Fort Cimarron but they had already left the fort by the time of the company's arrival. What was initially another reconnaissance mission involving Company A of the 3rd Battalion was changed to a direct action mission to seize the Pacora River Bridge and prevent Battalion 2000 from reaching Panama City.

=== PDF attack on Albrook AFB ===
Ten minutes after midnight, as Company A, under the command of Maj. Kevin M. Higgins was preparing to load into 3 UH-60s from the 1st Bn 228th Aviation Regiment in Hangar 450, small arms fire broke out at the Air Force base in a surprise attack by the PDF and bullets ripped through the hangar. The troops departed while under fire, and soon after the PDF withdrew. Two U.S. troops were injured in the attack.

=== Transport and setup ===
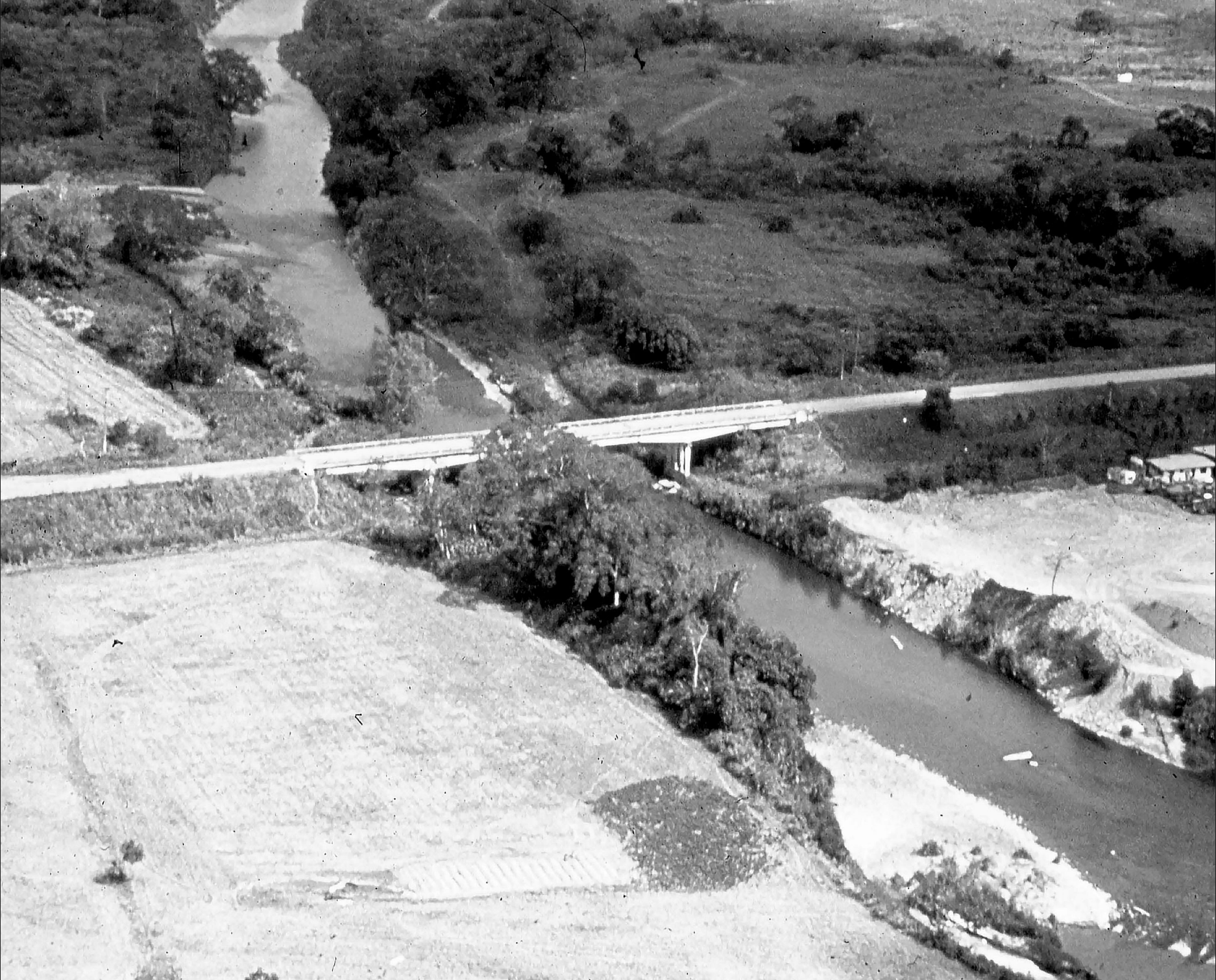
U.S. forces would have taken up ambush positions on the embankment to the left of the bridge

On the way to the bridge, the Blackhawks briefly became lost. While nearing the bridge, the pilot of the helicopter in the lead spotted a column of six PDF vehicles approaching from the east. Upon landing in an adjacent cow pasture, the U.S. troops ran up the 35 ft (11 m) embankment next to the road and set up ambush positions. During this, the first vehicle in the Panamanian column arrived at the east end of the bridge. Troops in the company were armed with 66mm light antitank weapons (likely M72 LAWs), M-249s, M-16s, AT-4 rockets and M203 grenade launchers.

== Battle ==
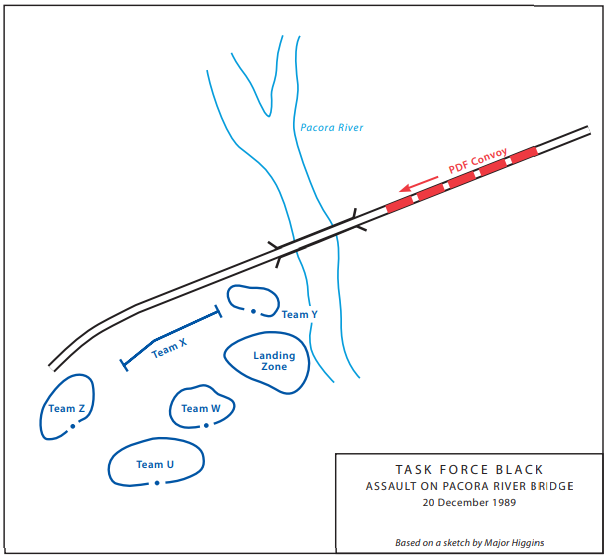
A map of the ambush made by Maj. Kevin M. Higgins

Immediately as the column appeared, three Green Berets fired their LAWs with two making direct hits. The column was then fired on by the company's SAWs and grenade launchers. With the PDF forces halted, Maj. Higgins contacted the Air Force Combat Controller who had a nearby AC-130 direct fire onto the column devastating it. As the PDF troops fled their vehicles, the AC-130 continued to circle and provide intelligence to the ground. Just after this, three more PDF vehicles arrived at the bridge and were fired on and destroyed by a second AC-130. Both aircraft continued to fire at enemy forces on either side of the bridge until most of the PDF broke contact and fled. The PDF forces tried to evade the fire coming from the AC-130s by the hiding under the bridge, but the Green Berets on the ground covered the girders with machine gun fire and buckshot rounds from their M203s. During the night the ground forces were augmented by elements of the 7th SFG's A Company, 1st Battalion as the PDF made several failed mounted attempts to flank the U.S. forces and capture the bridge. At daybreak Task Force BLACK's quick reaction force arrived under the command of Maj. Gilberto Perez. The QRF then cleared the east side of the Pacora River near the bridge and captured 17 PDF soldiers. The U.S. forces then met up with 82nd Airborne the next day.

== Aftermath ==
The United States suffered no casualties during the battle and inflicted heavy losses on the Panamanian forces with four killed, one wounded, and 17 captured. Virtually all vehicles in the column were rendered inoperable and the three armored vehicles were abandoned by the PDF nearby and captured.

== See also ==
- List of special forces units
