= Balad District =

Balad District may refer to:

- Balad District, Iraq
- Balad District, Somalia
- Al-Balad, Jeddah
