= Al-Faris =

Al-Faris Arabic: الفارس
- Town
- Location within Iraq
- Coordinates: 33°50′N 44°14′E
- Country: Iraq
- Governorate: Saladin
- District: Dujail
- Time zone: UTC+3 (AST)

Al-Faris is a Sunni Arab town in Dujail District in the Salah al-Din Governorate in Iraq.

== Climate ==
In Al-Faris, there is a desert climate. Most rain falls in the winter. The Köppen-Geiger climate classification is BWh. The average annual temperature in Al-Faris is 22.7 °C (72.9 °F). About 164 mm (6.46 in) of precipitation falls annually.

Climate data for Al-Faris
Month	Jan	Feb	Mar	Apr	May	Jun	Jul	Aug	Sep	Oct	Nov	Dec	Year
Mean daily maximum °C (°F)	15.6 (60.1)	18.2 (64.8)	22.3 (72.1)	28.5 (83.3)	35.7 (96.3)	41.1 (106.0)	43.7 (110.7)	43.4 (110.1)	39.8 (103.6)	33.3 (91.9)	24.5 (76.1)	17.3 (63.1)	30.3 (86.5)
Mean daily minimum °C (°F)	4.4 (39.9)	5.9 (42.6)	9.3 (48.7)	14.3 (57.7)	19.6 (67.3)	23.4 (74.1)	25.6 (78.1)	25.1 (77.2)	21.4 (70.5)	16.3 (61.3)	10.5 (50.9)	5.6 (42.1)	15.1 (59.2)
Average precipitation mm (inches)	25 (1.0)	28 (1.1)	29 (1.1)	21 (0.8)	8 (0.3)	0 (0)	0 (0)	0 (0)	0 (0)	4 (0.2)	19 (0.7)	30 (1.2)	164 (6.5)
Source: Climate-Data.org, Climate data
