= 244th Expeditionary Combat Aviation Brigade =

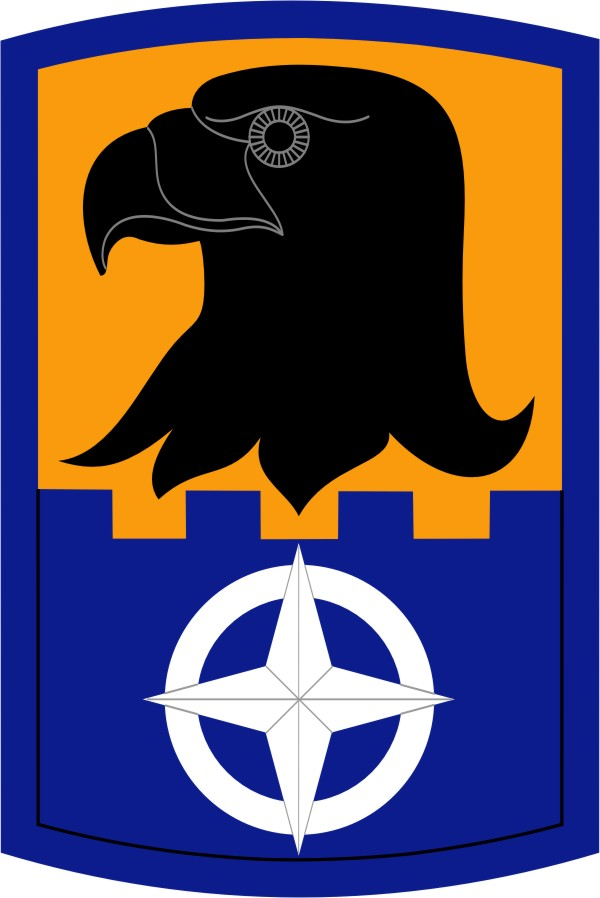
- 244th Aviation Brigade shoulder sleeve insignia
- Active: 16 September 1988 – present
- Country: United States
- Branch: United States Army Reserve
- Type: Composite Brigade
- Role: Daily missions;search and rescue operations; assisting in wildfire suppression; providing support at the Army National Training Center at Fort Irwin, California;, and flying dignitaries around the country.
- Part of: Army Reserve Aviation Command
- Garrison/HQ: Fort Knox, kentucky
- Motto: "Wings of The Hawk"

Insignia
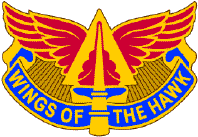
- Distinctive Unit Insignia

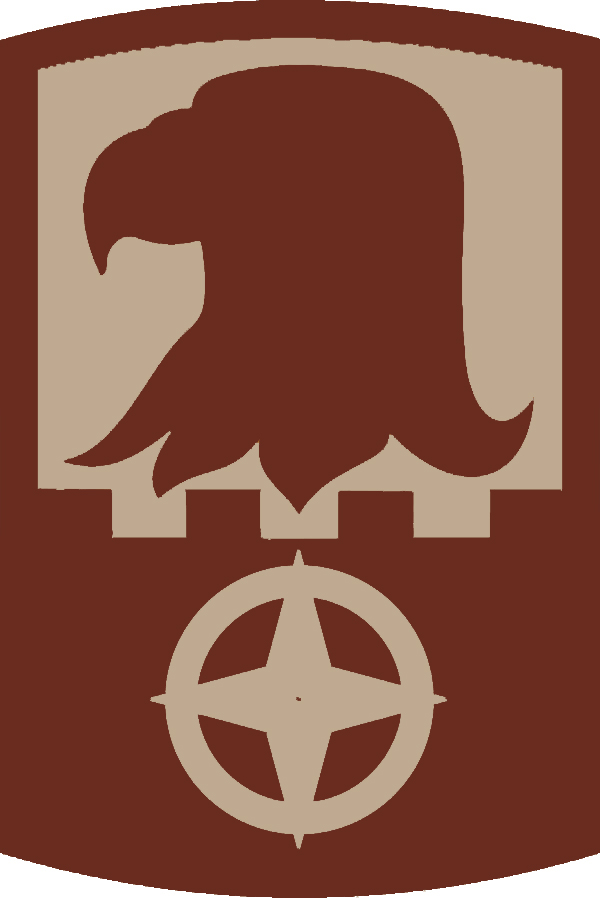
- 244 AVIATION BRIGADE SUBDUED DESERT SSI

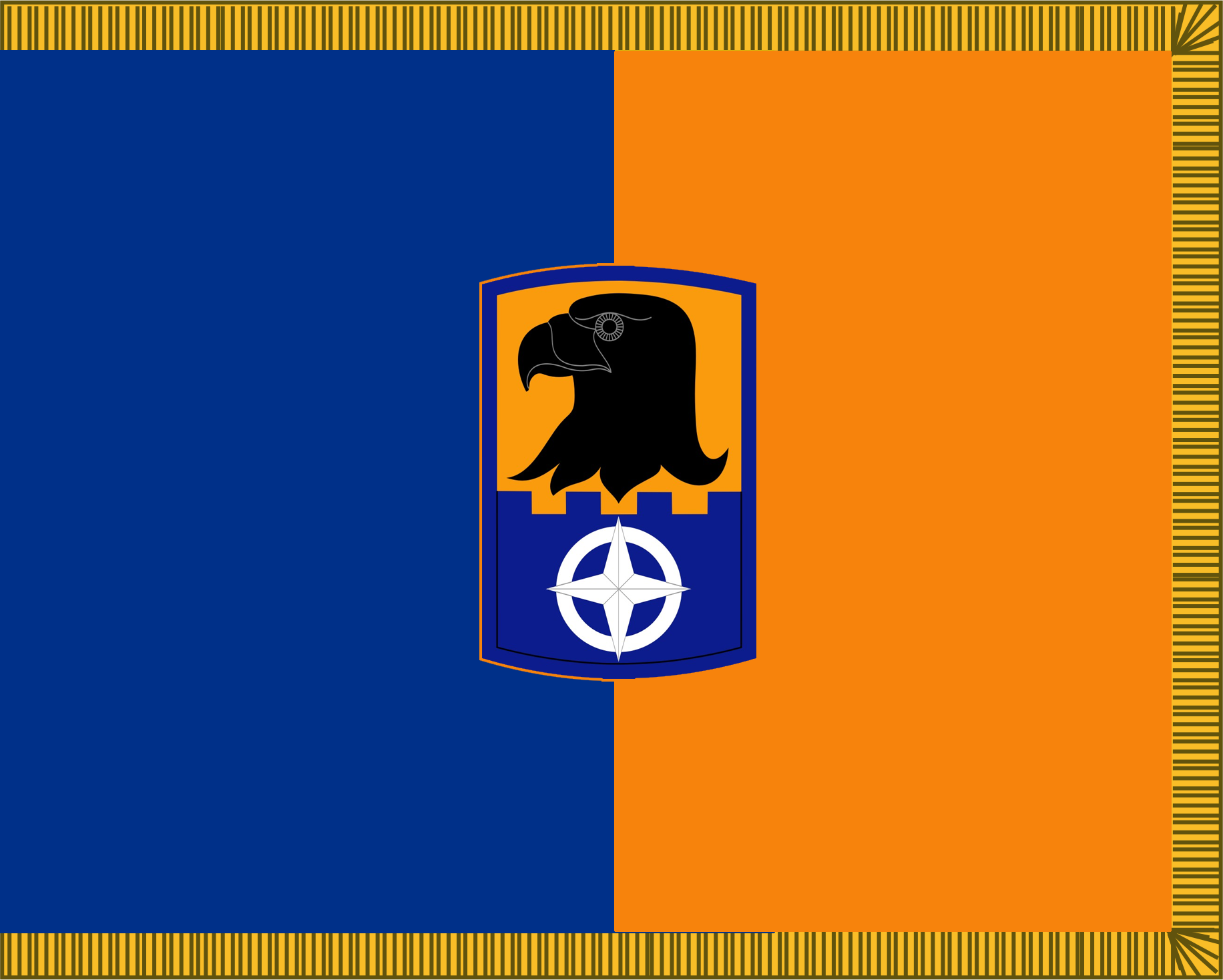
- 244th Aviation Brigade Flag

The 244th Expeditionary Combat Aviation Brigade (ECAB) is a Combat Aviation Brigade in the United States Army Reserve (USAR). It is one of two aviation brigades in the Army Reserve Aviation Command. The Army announced in May 2025 that it expects to deactivate the brigade in 2026.

The brigade was originally activated as the 24th Aviation Group in Glenview, Ill. and became the 244th Aviation Brigade in 1995. The restructuring in 1995 was a consolidation of USAR aviation units under a unified command. The brigade has taken part in Operation Desert Shield/Storm, Joint Forge, Noble Eagle, Operation Enduring Freedom, Operation Iraqi Freedom and Operation Inherent Resolve. The unit also has many humanitarian missions such as wildfire response and search and rescue operations.

== Organization ==
The brigade is a subordinate unit of the Army Reserve Aviation Command. As of January 2026 the brigade consists of the following units:

- 244th Expeditionary Combat Aviation Brigade, at Fort Knox (KY)
  - Headquarters and Headquarters Company, 244th Expeditionary Combat Aviation Brigade, at Fort Knox (KY)
  - 5th Battalion (General Support Aviation), 159th Aviation Regiment, at Joint Base Langley–Eustis (VA)
    - Headquarters and Headquarters Company, 5th Battalion (General Support Aviation), 159th Aviation Regiment, at Fort Eustis (VA)
    - Company A (CAC), 5th Battalion (General Support Aviation), 159th Aviation Regiment, at Army Aviation Support Facility Clearwater (FL)
    - Company B (Heavy Lift), 5th Battalion (General Support Aviation), 159th Aviation Regiment, at Fort Eustis (VA)
    - Company C (MEDEVAC), 5th Battalion (General Support Aviation), 159th Aviation Regiment, at Fort Knox (KY)
    - Company D (AVUM), 5th Battalion (General Support Aviation), 159th Aviation Regiment, at Fort Eustis (VA)
      - Detachment 1, Company D (AVUM), 5th Battalion (General Support Aviation), 159th Aviation Regiment, at Army Aviation Support Facility Clearwater (FL)
      - Detachment 2, Company D (AVUM), 5th Battalion (General Support Aviation), 159th Aviation Regiment, at Fort Knox (KY)
    - Company E (Forward Support), 5th Battalion (General Support Aviation), 159th Aviation Regiment, at Fort Eustis (VA)
      - Detachment 1, Company E (Forward Support), 5th Battalion (General Support Aviation), 159th Aviation Regiment, at Army Aviation Support Facility Clearwater (FL)
      - Detachment 2, Company E (Forward Support), 5th Battalion (General Support Aviation), 159th Aviation Regiment, at Fort Knox (KY)
    - Company F (ATS), 5th Battalion (General Support Aviation), 159th Aviation Regiment, at Fort Knox (KY)
    - Company G (MEDEVAC), 5th Battalion (General Support Aviation), 159th Aviation Regiment, at Army Aviation Support Facility Clearwater (FL)
  - 2nd Battalion (Fixed Wing), 228th Aviation Regiment, at Joint Base McGuire-Dix-Lakehurst (NJ)
    - Headquarters and Headquarters Company, 2nd Battalion (Fixed Wing), 228th Aviation Regiment, at Joint Base McGuire-Dix-Lakehurst (NJ)
    - Company A, 2nd Battalion (Fixed Wing), 228th Aviation Regiment, at Joint Base McGuire-Dix-Lakehurst (NJ)
    - Company B, 2nd Battalion (Fixed Wing), 228th Aviation Regiment, at Dobbins Air Reserve Base (GA)
      - Detachment 1, Company B, 2nd Battalion (Fixed Wing), 228th Aviation Regiment, at Fort Rucker (AL)
    - Company C, 2nd Battalion (Fixed Wing), 228th Aviation Regiment, at Pope Field (NC)
  - 8th Battalion (Assault), 229th Aviation Regiment, at Fort Knox (KY)
    - Headquarters and Headquarters Company, 8th Battalion (Assault), 229th Aviation Regiment, at Fort Knox (KY)
    - Company A, 8th Battalion (Assault), 229th Aviation Regiment, at Fort Knox (KY)
    - Company B, 8th Battalion (Assault), 229th Aviation Regiment, at Fort Knox (KY)
    - Company C, 8th Battalion (Assault), 229th Aviation Regiment, at Fort Knox (KY)
    - Company D (AVUM), 8th Battalion (Assault), 229th Aviation Regiment, at Fort Knox (KY)
    - Company E (Forward Support), 8th Battalion (Assault), 229th Aviation Regiment, at Fort Knox (KY)

Abbreviations: CAC — Command Aviation Company; MEDEVAC — Medical evacuation; AVUM — Aviation Unit Maintenance; FSC — Forward Support Company; ATS — Air Traffic Services
