= Qaryat al Misḩak =

Coordinates: 35°10′59″N 43°24′08″E

Qaryat al Misḩak (قرية المسحك) is a village in Saladin Province, Iraq that overlooks the banks of the Tigris River.
