= Yathrib, Iraq =

Yathrib ناحية يثرب
- city
- Location within Iraq
- Coordinates: 33°59′44″N 44°20′59″E
- Country: Iraq
- Governorate: Saladin
- Elevation: 56 m (184 ft)

Yathrib (Arabic: ناحية يثرب.), also transliterated Yethrib, is a city in the Salah ad Din Governorate, Iraq, 45 kilometres (28 mi) north of the national capital, Baghdad. It is in the so-called Sunni Triangle. The city is located right on the Tigris River. With the nearby cities and towns of Dhululiyah, Balad, Ishaqi, Dojama, Tarmiyah, and Taji, it forms the northern Baghdad "belt" and sits along two highways that run between Samarra and the capital city Baghdad.

== Iraq Insurgency 2014-present ==
ISIL forces captured the city and region, with Iraqi troops fighting to recover the area. Iran and Kata'ib Hezbollah employed ground forces to assist the Iraqi Army with ISIL releasing photos including one of a dead Hezbollah fighter. The US and allied countries launched bombings in and around Yathrib during the 2014 American-led intervention in Iraq.

== Relationship to Medina ==
Yathrib is the pre-Islamic name for the holy city of Medina.
