= Yankjah =

- Town
- Tuz Khurmatu's location in Iraq
- Coordinates: 34°51′24.8″N 44°34′13.3″E
- Country: Iraq
- Province: Saladin
- District: Tooz

Yankjah (Arabic: ينكجة; Turkish (Iraqi Turkmen): Yenice) is a town in the Tooz District of Saladin Governorate, Iraq, approximately 100 km (62 mi) from the Iranian border. Its native population of around 25,000 is predominantly Sunni Turkmen.
