= Al-Mu'tasim, Iraq =

Al-Mu'tasim (Arabic: المعتصم) is a town in Saladin Governorate, Iraq, near the city of Samarra. It is named for the 9th-century caliph Al-Mu'tasim who founded Samarra as his capital city.

== History ==
In June 2014 al-Mu'tasim was the scene of fighting between Iraqi government forces and the insurgent Islamic State of Iraq and the Levant (ISIS). In April 2021 three ISIS attacks caused two deaths and led to tighter temporary security measures in al-Mu'tasim.
