= Al-Hajaj =

Coordinates: 34.831841°N 43.510838°E

Al-Hajaj is a town in Baiji District, Salah ad Din Governorate, Iraq. The town has an estimated population in 2002 of about 65,000. Most of the people who live in the city are governmental employees and farmers.

== Attacks ==
On January 21, 2008 a suicide bomber killed 18 and wounded 22 in a funeral tent.

On March 9, 2017 at least 21 people are killed after two suicide bombers attack a wedding.
