= Balad District, Iraq =

Balad District
- District
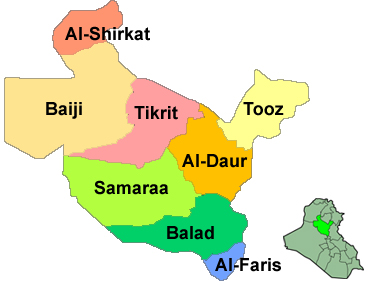
- Interactive map of Balad District
- Coordinates: 33°50′N 44°02′E
- Country: Iraq
- Governorate: Salah ad Din
- Seat: Balad

Area
  - Total: 2,469 km^{2} (953 sq mi)

Population (2024)
  - Total: 228,925
  - Density: 92.72/km^{2} (240.1/sq mi)
- Time zone: UTC+3 (AST)

Balad District (Arabic: قضاء بلد) is a district of the Saladin Governorate, Iraq. It covers an area of 2,469 km^{2} (953 sq mi), and had a population of 167,590 in 2003. The district capital is the city of Balad.

== Balad District ==
Balad District consists of several towns:

- Balad
- Al Dhuluiya
- Ishaqi
- Yathrib
- Aziz Balad
- Al Rowashid
- Tel Al Thahab
- Al Owaisat
