= Balad, Iraq =

Balad بلد
- City
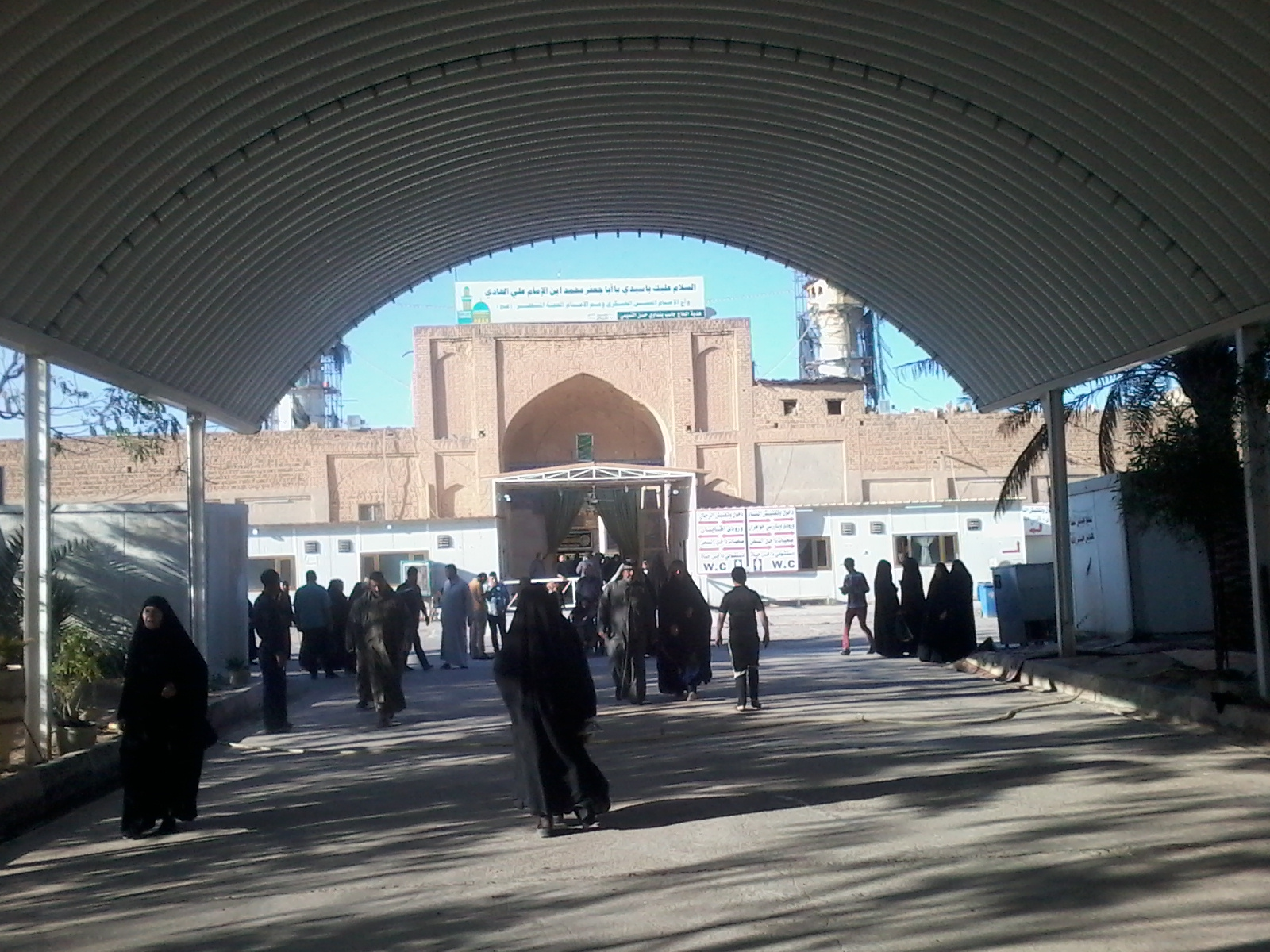

- Location within Iraq
- Coordinates: 34°0′59″N 44°08′43″E
- Country: Iraq
- Governorate: Saladin
- District: Balad
- Elevation: 52 m (171 ft)

Population (2015)
  - Total: 80,000

Balad (Arabic: بلد), also transliterated Beled or Belad, is a city in Saladin Governorate, Iraq, 80 kilometres (50 mi) north of the national capital, Baghdad. It is the capital of Balad District. Located in Iraq's volatile Sunni Triangle, between the towns of Al Dhuluiya, Yathrib and Ishaqi, Balad's inhabitants are primarily farmers who work mainly on grape and date farms and as citrus growers.

In the later months of 2014 the city was besieged by Islamic State of Iraq and the Levant forces, which were repelled by the Shia citizens of the city and the Iraqi Army.

== During the Iraq War ==
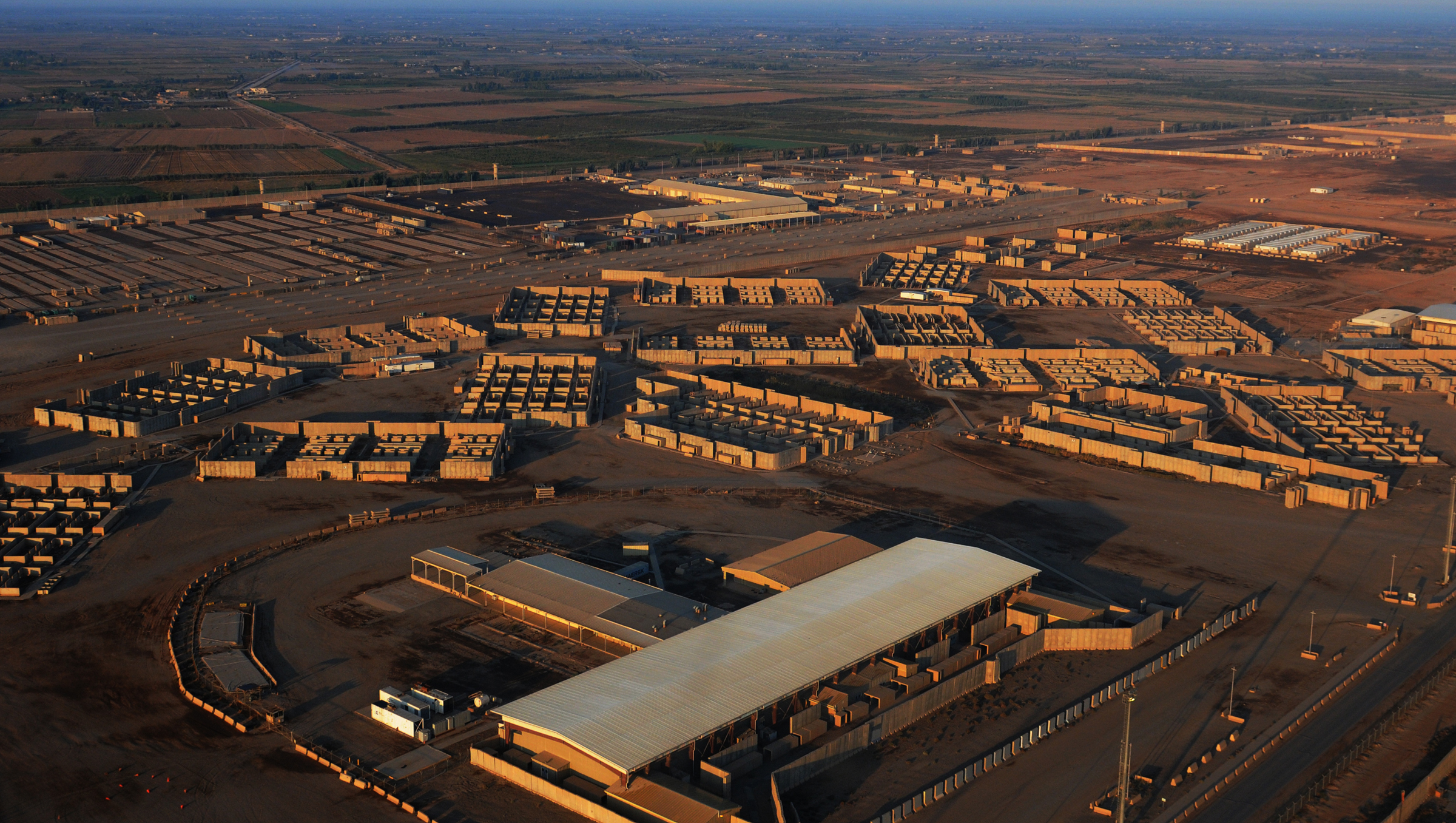
Balad Air Base following the withdrawal of U.S. forces

During the Iraq War Balad was, in 2006, the site of sectarian violence involving Sunni and Shi'ite militias.

In 2007 the mayor, Amir Abdul Hadi, escaped an assassination attempt.

== Military installations ==
The largest military air base in Iraq, formerly LSA Anaconda, Balad Air Base, or Al-Bakir Air Base, is located within the municipality of Yathrib near Balad. As of early 2007 the base was the central hub for airlift and US Air Force operations in Iraq; it was also a major transshipment point for US Army supply convoys.

On the outskirts of Balad proper there was a tiny forward operating base called Balad Joint Coordination Center (formerly FOB Paliwoda). Over the years, FOB Paliwoda had been occupied by 1st Battalion, 8th Infantry, 3rd Brigade Combat Team, and 3rd Squadron 4th US Cavalry in an effort to create a joint effort between coalition and local forces.

== 2016 attack ==
On 7 July 2016, Islamic State militants attacked the tomb of Muhammad ibn Ali al-Hadi, the son of Ali al-Hadi and the brother of Hasan al-Askari. According to Reuters, citing Iraqi security forces, "at least 20 people were killed and 50 others wounded on Thursday evening in an attack on a Shi'ite mausoleum north of Baghdad". A suicide car bomb blew up at the external gate of the mausoleum, allowing several gunmen to storm the site and start shooting at pilgrims on a visit on the occasion of the Eid al-Fitr festival.
