= Saladin Governorate =

Governorate of Iraq

Saladin Governorate محافظة صلاح الدين
- Governorate
- Ṣalāḥ al-Dīn
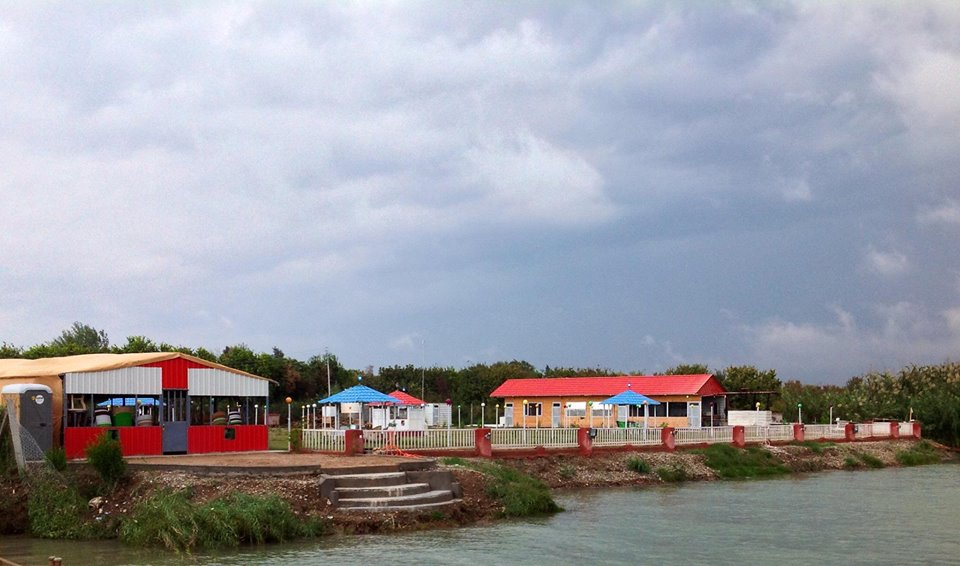

- Coordinates: 34°27′N 43°35′E
- Country: Iraq
- Capital: Tikrit
- Governor: Haitham Mahmoud al-Zahwan

Area
  - Total: 24,751 km^{2} (9,556 sq mi)

Population (2024 census)
  - Total: 1,774,542
  - Density: 71.696/km^{2} (185.69/sq mi)
- Official language(s): Arabic
- HDI (2024): 0.736 high · 4th of 18
- Website: salahaldeen.gov.iq

The Saladin, Salah ad Din, or Salah Al-Din Governorate (Arabic: محافظة صلاح الدين, Muḥāfaẓat Ṣalāḥ al-Dīn) is one of Iraq's 19 governorates, north of Baghdad. It has an area of 24,363 square kilometres (9,407 sq mi), with a population of 1,774,542 people in 2024. It is made up of 8 districts, with the capital being Tikrit. Before 1976 the governorate was part of Baghdad Governorate.

The governorate is named after Saladin or Salah ad-Din. This governorate is largely Sunni Arab and is also where Saddam Hussein, former president of Iraq, was born, in the village of Al-Awja. Salah Al-Din governorate, a traditional stronghold of Saddam and his Al-Bu Nasir tribe that is located in the heart of the Sunni Triangle, has been a centre of insurgencies, tribal rivalries, and political and sectarian violence since the 2003 U.S.-led Coalition invasion of Iraq including the rise of ISIL.

== History ==
Saladin Governorate contains a number of important religious and cultural sites. Samarra, the governorate's largest city, is home to both the Al-Askari Shrine (an important religious site in Shia Islam where the 10th and 11th Shia Imams are buried), and the Great Mosque of Samarra with its distinctive Malwiya minaret. It also contains an old Zengid mosque.

Samarra was the capital of the Abbasid Caliphate in the 9th century CE, and today Abbasid Samarra is a UNESCO World Heritage Site.

The ancient Neo-Assyrian Empire Assyrian city of Assur is located in Al-Shirqat District on the banks of the Tigris River. Other sites in the governorate include the Crusader Dome (القبة الصلبية) north of Samarra and the Al-`Ashaq Palace (قصر العاشق).

In January 2014, there were plans announced by Prime Minister Nouri al-Maliki to make the Tuz Khurmatu district into a new governorate due to its Turkmen majority. However, these plans were not implemented.

=== Autonomy ===
In October 2011, the governorate's administration declared itself a semi-autonomous region, explaining that the declaration was in response to the central government's "domination over the provincial council authorities". Saladin, which is a largely Sunni governorate, is also hoping that by declaring themselves an autonomous region within Iraq, it will entail them to a larger portion of government funding. The council cited "article 119 of Iraq's constitution" in its call for autonomy, which states that "one or more governorates shall have the right to organize into a region" if one third of the Provincial Council members or one tenth of the voters request to form a region".

== Provincial government ==
- Governor: Ammar Jabr al-Jubouri
- Deputy Governor: Ammar Hikmat
- Provincial Council Chairman: Ahmed Abdel-Jabbar al-Karim

== Districts ==
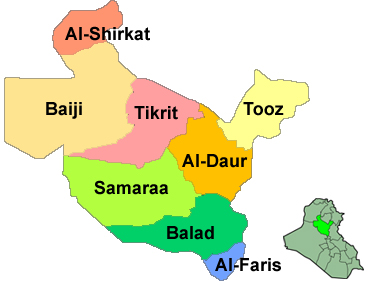
Salah ad Din districts

- Al-Daur District (Al-Daur)
- Al-Shirqat District (Al-Shirqat)
- Baiji District (Baiji)
- Balad District (Balad)
- Samarra District (Samarra)
- Tikrit District (Tikrit)
- Tooz District (Tuz Khurmatu)
- Dujail District (Dujail) - previously known as "Al-Faris District"

== Towns and cities ==
- Tikrit
- Baiji
- Balad
- Samarra
- Tarmiyah
- Dujail
- Al-Daur (Ad-Dawr)
- Yathrib
- Al-Shirqat
- Sulaiman Bek
- Yankjah
- Tuz Khurmatu
- Ishaqi
- Amirli
- Azwai City (incl. Qaryat al Misḩak)
- Al Hatamia
- Al Moshahda
- Al Seniyah (Seneia Town)
- Al Alam
- Al Dhuluiya
- Al Sareen
- Al-Sedira (سّديرة)
- Al-Mu'tasim
- Al-Faris (Bamerni)
- Al-Hajaj
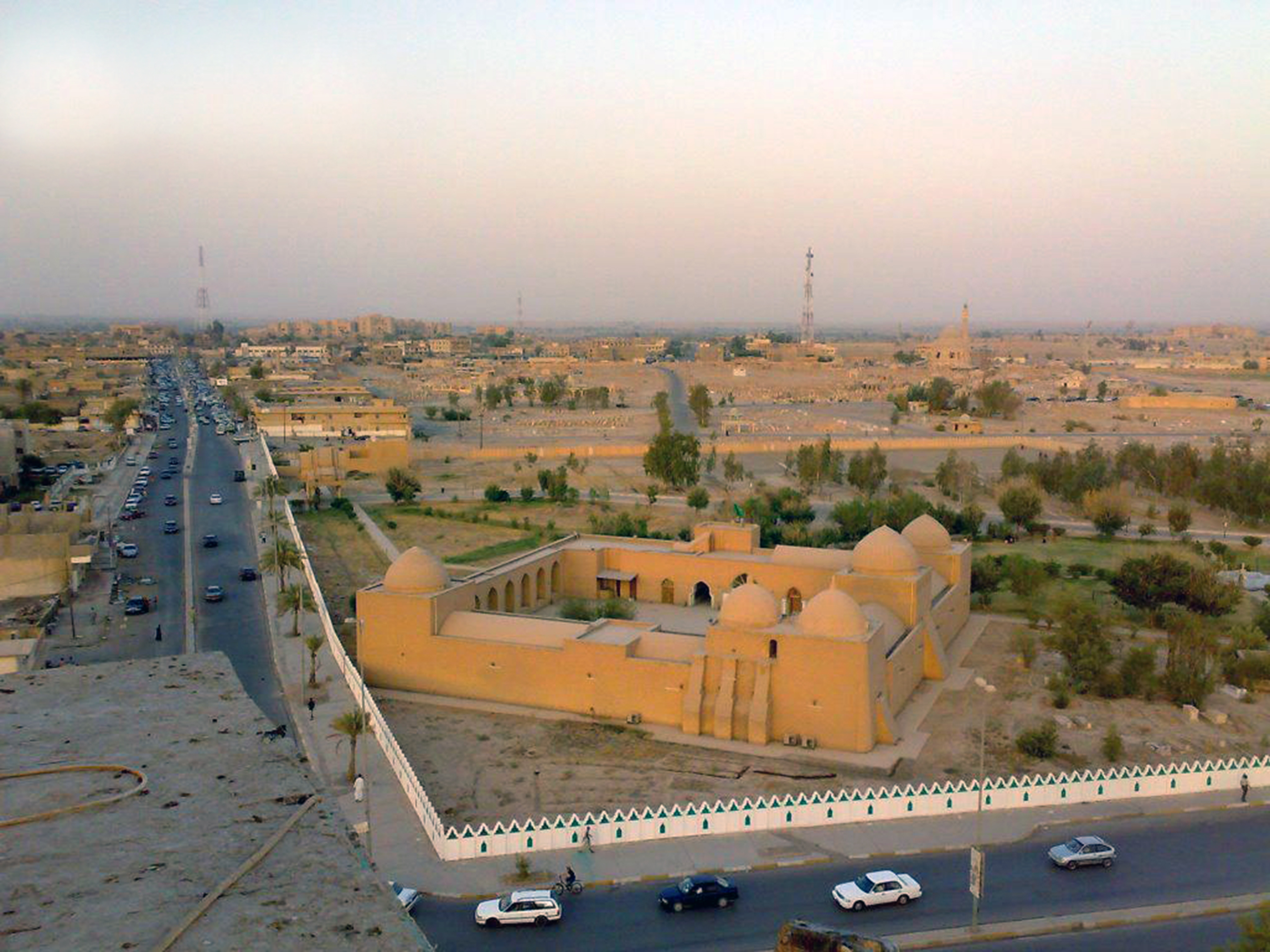
Tikrit

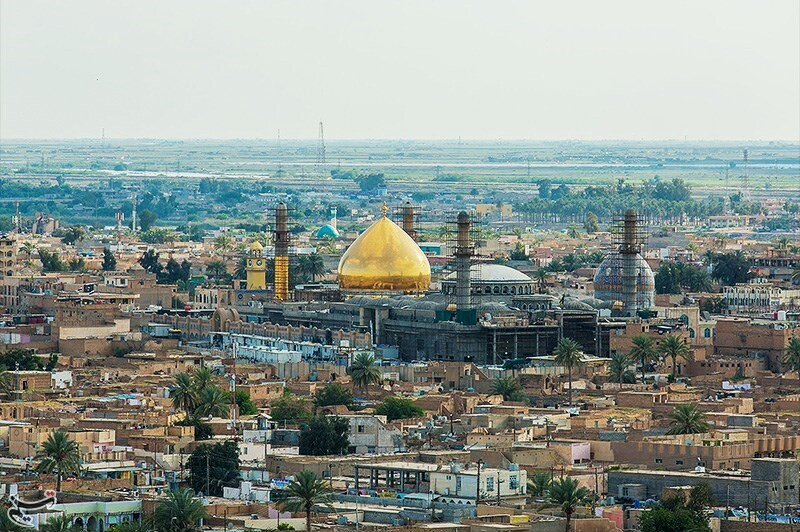
Samarra

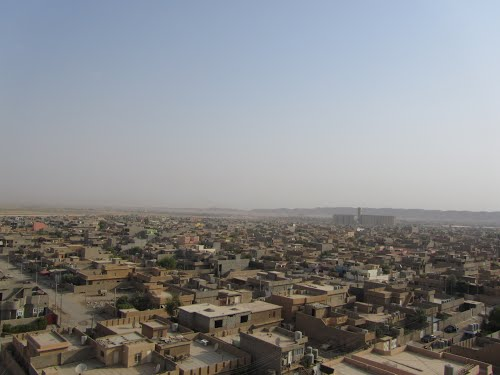
Tuz Khurmatu

== Population ==
The following table shows the populations of the districts of Saladin Governorate, according to the United Nations in 2003. No data is available for Dujail District.

District	Samarra	Tikrit	Balad	Baiji	Al-Shirqat	Al-Daur	Tooz	Total
Population	348,700	180,300	107,600	134,000	121,500	46,700	103,400	1,042,200
