= Dujail District =

Dujail District قضاء الدجيل
- District
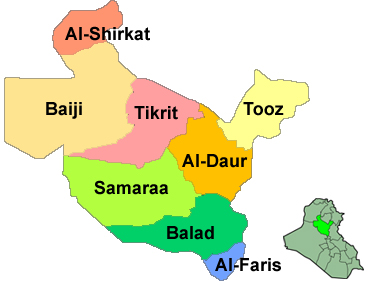
- Interactive map of Dujail District
- Country: Iraq
- Province: Saladin Governorate
- Seat: Dujail
- Time zone: UTC+3 (AST)

Dujail District (Arabic: قضاء الدجيل; formerly, Al-Faris) is a district in the southern part of Saladin Governorate, Iraq. Its main settlement is the small town of Dujail.

Dujail was the site of the Dujail Massacre by Saddam Hussein's agents, after an assassination attempt on him there. Saddam was later convicted and hanged for ordering the massacre.

== See also ==
- Dujail Massacre
