= 11th Expeditionary Combat Aviation Brigade =

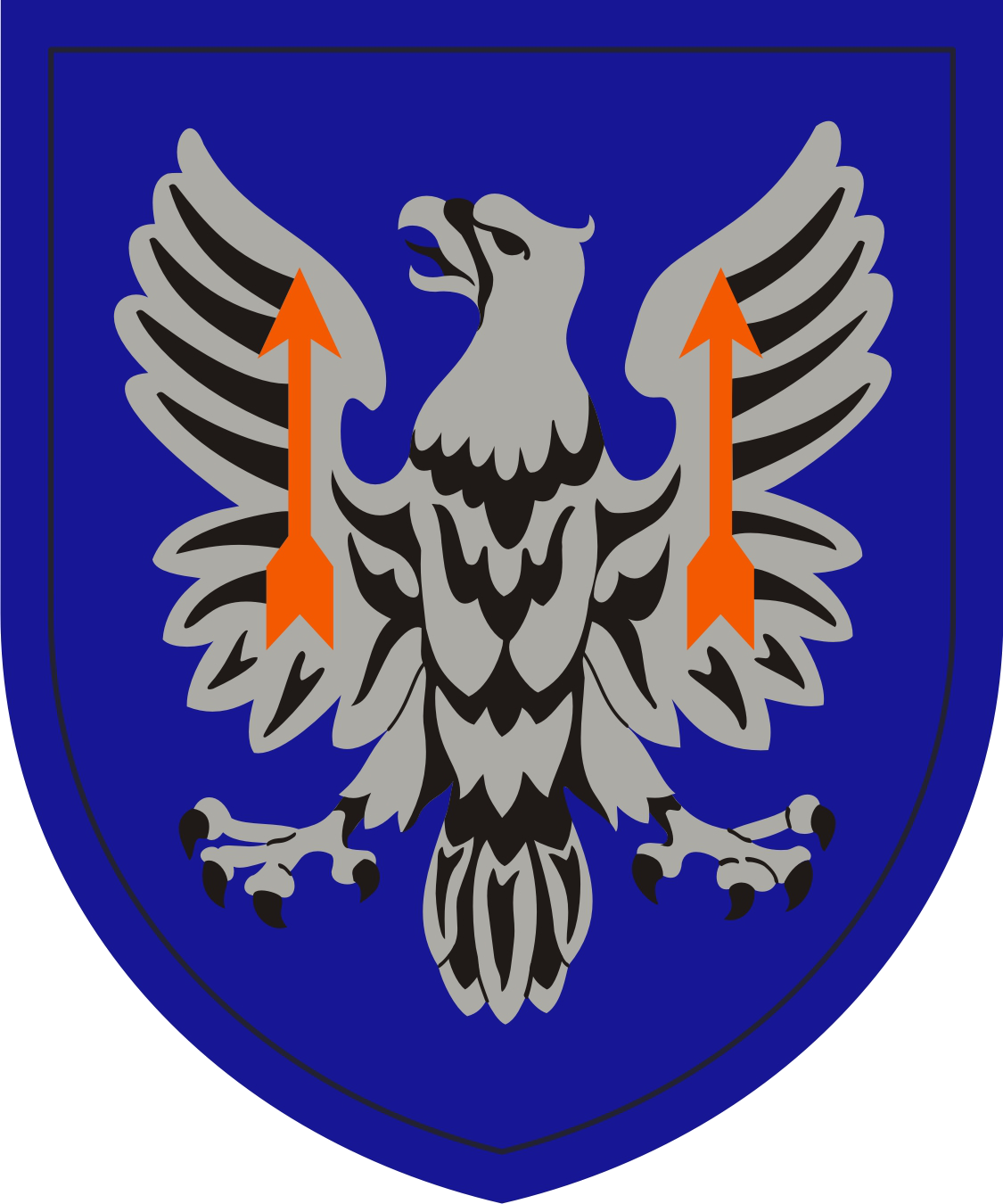
- 11th ECAB shoulder sleeve insignia
- Active: 2007 – present
- Country: United States
- Branch: United States Army Reserve
- Role: Aviation
- Size: Composite Brigade
- Part of: Army Reserve Aviation Command
- Garrison/HQ: Fort Carson, Colorado
- Motto: We Make The Difference

Insignia
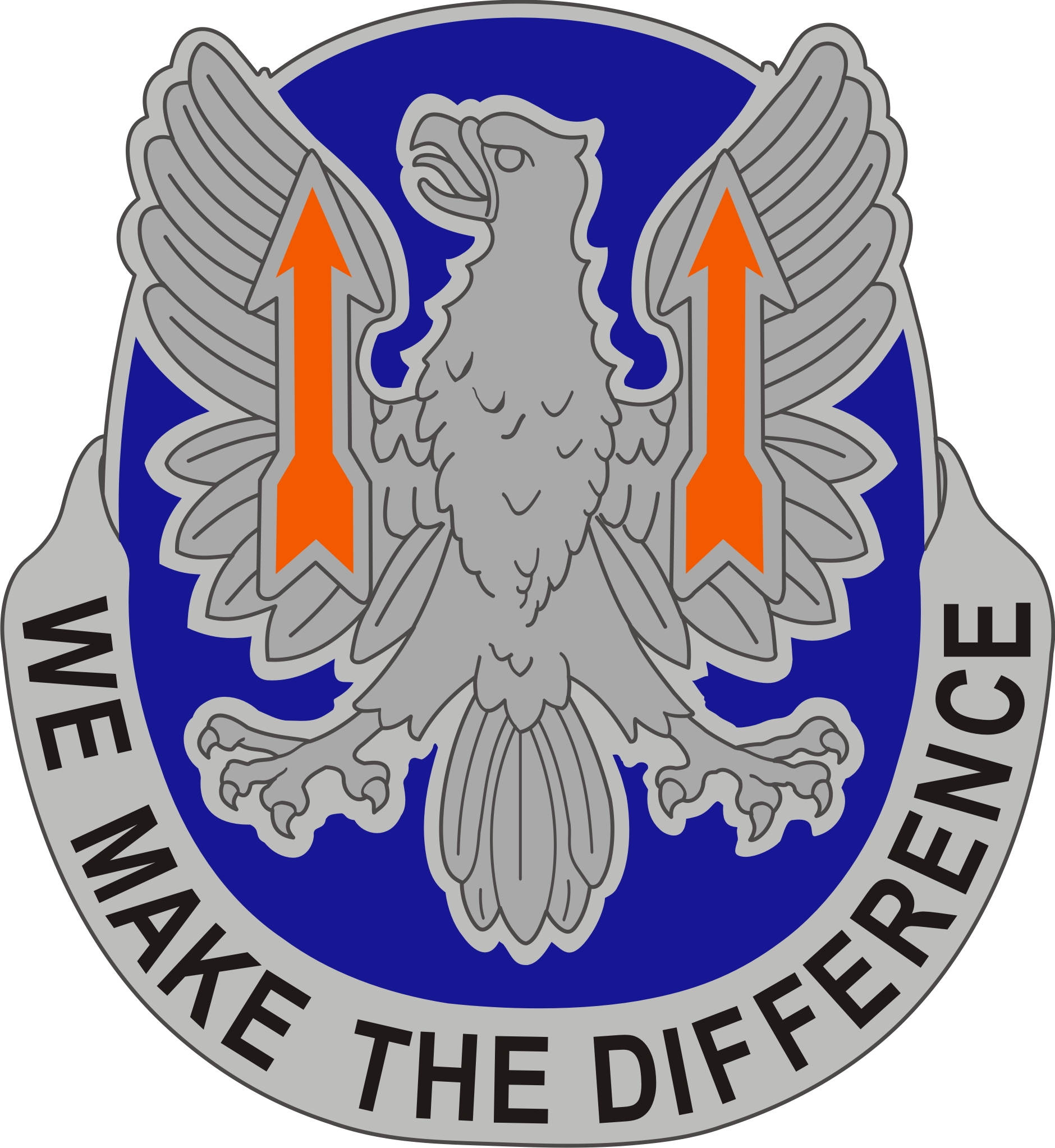
- Distinctive Unit Insignia

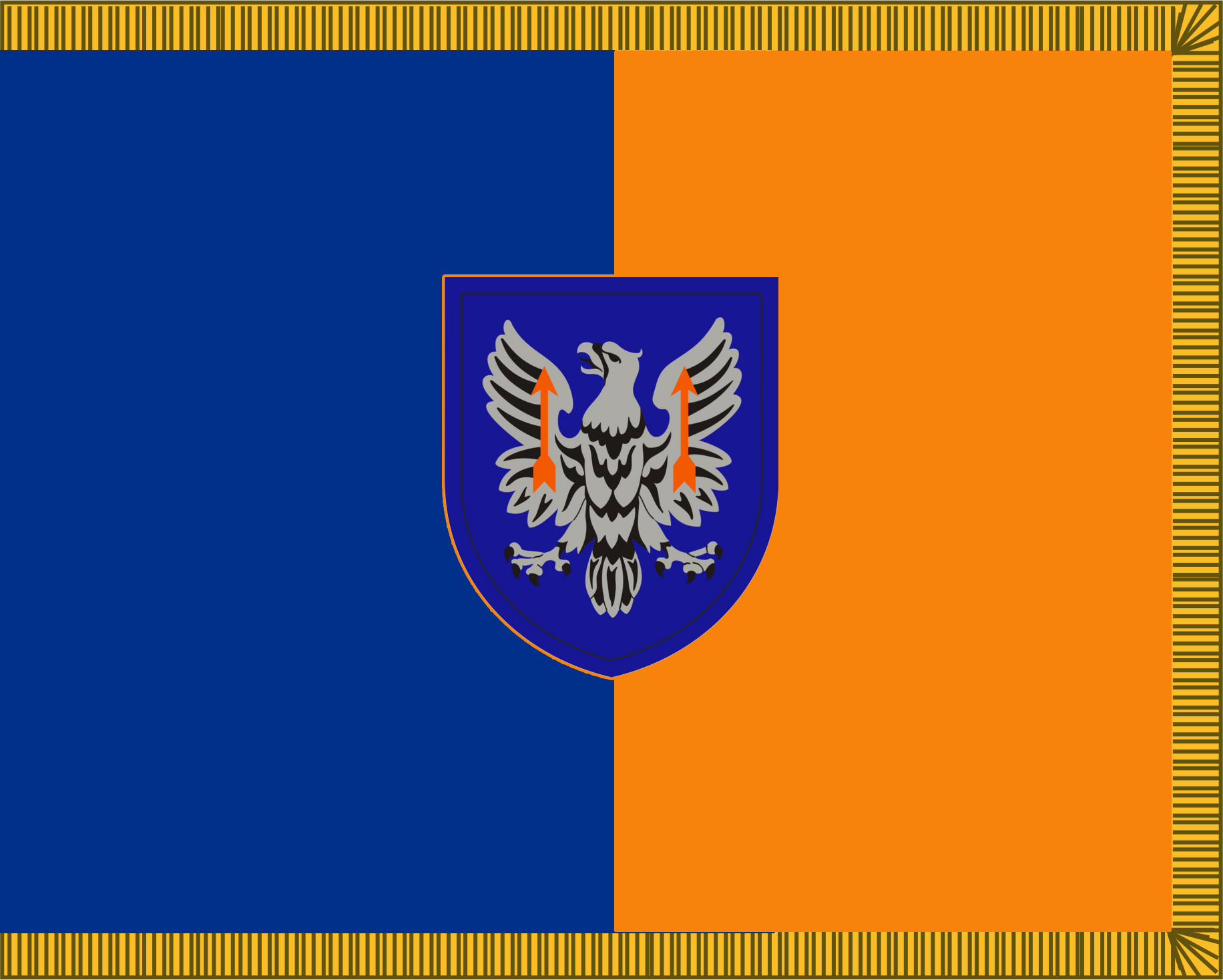
- 11th Combat Aviation Brigade Flag

The 11th Expeditionary Combat Aviation Brigade is a Combat Aviation Brigade in the United States Army Reserve. The unit traces its history to the test aviation group of the 11th Air Assault Division (Test) in the 1960s. It is one of two aviation brigades of Army Reserve Aviation Command. The brigade consists of a headquarters company, two Black Hawk assault battalions, and one fixed wing battalion. The brigade was activated in its current form on 16 September 2016. The Army announced in May 2025 that it expects to deactivate the brigade in 2026.

== Vietnam era (1962–1972) ==
In 1962, the Department of the Army decided that infantry units would need to be moved by helicopter - air mobility (heliborne tactical movement). Secretary of the Army Cyrus R. Vance decided that the Army required its organic aviation assets to meet the immediate combat needs of infantry units. The XVIII Airborne Corps began experimenting with this new concept by using borrowed helicopters. By the end of the year, Secretary Vance decided to form a test division to further evaluate the concept.

On 1 February 1963, Headquarters and Headquarters Company, 11th Aviation Group, was activated for testing purposes as a Regular Army element of the 11th Air Assault Division (Test). Under the leadership of Major General Charles W. G. Rich, the Test Director, and Brigadier General Harry Kinnard, the Division Commander, the group built the capability to move one-third of the division's infantry battalions and supporting units in one single helicopter lift. The unit operated out of Fort Benning, Georgia.

The testing process proved highly successful and on 1 July 1965 the group was reassigned to the 1st Cavalry Division (Airmobile) when the assets of the 11th Air Assault Division and the 2nd Infantry Division were merged into a single unit. Within several months the division deployed to South Vietnam.

The mission of the 1st Cavalry was to "fight battles of movement, ranging swiftly to places where they are needed." Secretary of Defense Robert S. McNamara described the new 428 helicopter-equipped 1st Cavalry Division as "an entirely new approach to the conduct of land battle which will result in the exploitation of the principle of surprise to an unprecedented degree."

As part of the 1st Cavalry, the 11th Aviation Group controlled the 227th Aviation Battalion (Assault Helicopter), 228th Aviation Battalion (Medium Helicopter) and 229th Aviation Battalion (Assault Helicopter), whose helicopters were the lifeblood of the Army's first airmobile division. The group also included the 11th Aviation Company (General Support), 17th Aviation Company (Airmobile Light) and 478th Aviation Company (Heavy Helicopter).

From 1965 through 1968 the 11th Aviation Group saw combat in the I and II Corps areas of South Vietnam. The Group was awarded the Presidential Unit Citation for the Pleiku campaign of 1965 and the Meritorious Unit Commendation for the period September 1965 to November 1966. In 1968, the Group moved to Phước Vĩnh Base Camp in III Corps and remained there until early 1971 where the Group was awarded the Valorous Unit Award for the period 6 May 1969 through 1 February 1970.

In February 1971 the Group was assigned to the 1st Aviation Brigade and redeployed to Marble Mountain Army Airfield near Da Nang; it was officially released from the 1st Cavalry Division on 5 May 1971. In August 1972 the Group departed Marble Mountain Army Airfield and resettled at Da Nang Air Base.

== Germany era (1973–1989) ==
The colors of the 11th Aviation Group left Vietnam in March 1973, bound for Dolan Barracks in Schwäbisch Hall, Germany, where they were used to reflag an existing aviation group. The Group's mission was to support Headquarters US Army Europe and the Seventh Army. In November 1979 the 11th Aviation Group became a major subordinate command of VII Corps.

In 1984–5, the 223rd Aviation Battalion (Combat) of the 11th Aviation Group (Combat) was headquartered at Echterdingen, with the 25th, 48th, and 180th Aviation Companies assigned (one at Schwäbisch Hall).

During the period 1980–1987, while the 11th Aviation Group was at Dolan Barracks in Schwäbisch Hall in the German State of Baden-Württemberg, another unit, the 11th Aviation Battalion (later the 11th Aviation Regiment) was based in the neighboring German State of Hesse at Wiesbaden Air Base under the 12th Aviation Group and V Corps. The proximity of the unit's locations in the former West Germany may be a source of confusion, as the distinctive unit insignias of the 11th Aviation Brigade and 11th Aviation Regiment (formerly the 11th Aviation Battalion) are sometimes confused, with the insignia of the latter being mistaken as the insignia for the former. The insignia of the 11th Aviation Regiment can be seen here , while the insignia of the 11th Aviation Brigade can be seen as an external link here . The 11th Aviation Regiment still exists and currently performs a training support role at Fort Rucker, Alabama, as the 1st Battalion, 11th Aviation Regiment, part of the 110th Aviation Brigade.

The 11th Aviation Group was reorganized and redesignated 16 October 1987 as Headquarters and Headquarters Company, 11th Aviation Brigade, and three months later the brigade fielded the first AH-64 attack helicopter unit in Europe, the 2d Squadron, 6th Cavalry Regiment. This firmly established the brigade's role as a decisive combat element in the NATO alliance. In August 1988, the 11th Aviation Brigade moved to Storck Barracks in Illesheim. Other battalions within the 11th Aviation Brigade included the 4th Battalion, 229th Advanced Attack Helicopter Regiment (AAHR); 6th Squadron, 6th Cavalry Regiment; 4th Battalion, 159th Aviation Regiment (located in Stuttgart, Germany); Company A, 5th Battalion, 159th Aviation Regiment (located in Schwabisch Hall, Germany); and Company C, 6th Battalion, 159th Aviation Regiment (located in Schwabisch Hall, Germany). The brigade lost two AH-64A Apache's to wire strikes during this time. One from the 2nd Squadron, 6th Cavalry occurred in 1989 near the airfield, and a second from the 4th Battalion, 229th AAHR in early November 1990 just to the north of Nuremburg as the unit was preparing to deploy as part of Operation DESERT SHIELD.

As a group, personnel of the 11th wore the shoulder sleeve insignia (SSI) of VII Corps, to which it was assigned. With its redesignation as a brigade it qualified for its own SSI and it adopted a design based upon its distinctive unit insignia (DUI).

During its years in Germany, the Group had a pathfinder platoon of about a dozen personnel. The unit traced its lineage back to the 11th Airborne Division pathfinders of World War II and the post-war years, as well as the pathfinders of the 11th Aviation Group in Vietnam. Like some other small Airborne infantry units, members of the platoon initially wore the light blue Infantry School flash as an expedient. The flash was mainly worn at that time by cadre members of the 4th Airborne Student Training Battalion (aka "jump school") at Fort Benning, which was reflagged on 23 October 1985 as the 1st Battalion, 507th Infantry (redesignated 1 October 2005 as the 1st Battalion, 507th Infantry Regiment). Eventually the platoon submitted the 11th Airborne Division design and was granted approval by the United States Army Institute of Heraldry; however, the new flash and matching wing trimming were only worn for about a year due to the unit's inactivation. The authorization for a pathfinder platoon was dropped in the late 1980s and personnel departed as their tours were completed.

== Gulf War and afterwards, 1990-95 ==
The 11th Aviation Brigade deployed to Saudi Arabia as part of the VII Corps beginning in late November, 1990, with most elements in place by January 1, 1991 (6th Squadron, 6th Cavalry did not deploy to Saudi Arabia). Initially the 11th Aviation Brigade was assigned to an area just south of the Tapline Road at a small oil pump station known as "IPS3" (believed to have meant "Iraqi Pumping Station 3"). The site included a small runway and hard billets for some members of the brigade.

During the middle of February 1991, the brigade and it's assigned units began to move to the west into the Saudi Arabian desert, just to the west of the small city of Hafr Al-Batin, Saudi Arabia. This was part of the "Left hook" move which General Schwarzkopf had planned. It was from this location where the brigade launched night deep attack missions using the 4th Battalion, 229th AAHR on the night of 26 and morning of 27 February 1991. The brigade also sent AH-64s to escort Gen Schwarzkopf's meeting with Iraqi Generals to discuss the ceasefire at Safwan Airfield. After the cease fire, elements of the brigade including the 4th Battalion, 229th AAHR were sent to As Salman Airfield in southern Iraq to enforce the terms of the cease fire. It was during this time that the brigade suffered lost an OH-58C killing the pilot and aerial observer.

At the conclusion of Operation Desert Storm, the brigade was assigned to sector security in the former XVIII Airborne Corps area of responsibility. The front covered more than 200 kilometers. The 11th Aviation Brigade began redeployment to Germany on 22 April 1991. It was then reorganized and redesignated 17 November 1993 back to being Headquarters and Headquarters Company (HHC), 11th Aviation Group. It was at this time that the 11th began to be erroneously referred to as a regiment, rather than a group, and this error continued until the unit's inactivation in 2005; however, the U.S. Army Center of Military History confirmed that the 11th's HHC was organized as an aviation group, not a regiment. The CMH clarified the matter by stating, "Although the unit is frequently referred to as the 11th Aviation Regiment, it is actually organized under the TOE for an Aviation Group and its official designation is HHC, 11th Aviation Group."

== Bosnia and Kosovo era (1996–1999) ==
In April 1996, C Troop (+), 6th Squadron, 6th Cavalry Regiment deployed to Camp Hampton, Bosnia and Herzegovina in support of Operation Joint Endeavor and the 1st Brigade, 1st Armored Division. The deployment was critical to Implementation Force's success in establishing stability in the Multi-National Division (North) sector.

In the summer of 1996, the 11th Aviation Group received a warning order to form and train an aviation task force for possible deployment to Bosnia-Herzegovina. The deployment was to be as a part of the Task Force Eagle Covering Force, overseeing the withdrawal of the 1st Armored Division.

On 4 October 1996, the unit received its deployment orders, and within five days HHC, 11th Aviation Group; 2nd Squadron, 6th Cavalry Regiment; 2nd Battalion, 1st Aviation Regiment; Companies A and B, 7th Battalion, 159th Aviation Regiment; 147th Maintenance Support Team; Company C, 3rd Battalion (Air Traffic Services), 58th Aviation Regiment; and the 45th Medical Company (Air Ambulance) began departing Germany en route to Bosnia-Herzegovina in support of Operation Joint Endeavor.

Assembling at Comanche Base, the 700 soldiers of Task Force 11 transferred authority with their 1st Armored Division counterparts on 4 November 1996, and immediately provided critical support to MND (North), where tensions between the Former Warring Factions were high.

On 20 December, the covering force completed its mission as a part of the Implementation Force and transitioned to operations as a part of the Stabilization Force.

On 15 May 1997, the 229th Aviation Regiment executed transfer of authority with Task Force 11 as the Multi-National Division (North) Aviation Brigade. After processing at the intermediate staging base in Taszar, Hungary, the last elements of Task Force 11 closed on their home stations on 25 May 1997.

In May 1998 11th Aviation Group deployed to Tuzla, Bosnia with HHC and 6th Squadron, 6th Cavalry Regiment as part of Operation JOINT GUARD/FORGE. From May to October the Task Force performed as the Strategic Reserve for SFOR and the 1AD led Multinational Division North ensuring the continued implementation of the Dayton Peace Accords. Following transfer of authority to elements of the 1st Cavalry Division, the Group redeployed to Illesheim, Germany.

Following notification in late March 1999, the 11th Aviation Group was once again deployed on 8 April 1999 to Tirana, Albania in support of NATO Operation ALLIED FORCE in Kosovo. Over the next three months the Group remained postured for combat operations as the main effort for Task Force Hawk. TF Hawk deployed two attack helicopters squadrons of pilots, both aviation unit maintenance (AVUMs), 24 of their 48 AH-64s and a partial aviation maintenance (AVIM) unit to Albania. The remaining aircraft and AVIM(-) were left in Germany, where the AVIM(-) took control of the 24 AH-64s and readied them for possible deployment. Early on TF Hawk determined that the 11th Aviation Group, the two squadrons and the CORPS DOCC did not have enough aviation staff officers to simultaneously plan, rehearse and execute the current mission and the upcoming missions.

Following the success of the air campaign, 6th Squadron, 6th Cavalry Regiment deployed forward to Camp Able Sentry, Macedonia and were the first members of the NATO alliance to enter Kosovo in the implementation of peace accords as part of Operation JOINT GUARDIAN. With the groundwork for peace and resettlement of refugees established, the Group once again redeployed to Illesheim with the final aircraft returning 4 August 1999.

== 2003 invasion of Iraq ==
A Warning Order was issued in August 2002 stating that Apache helicopters would be sent to Kuwait to prepare for the 2003 invasion of Iraq (Operation Iraqi Freedom).

The 2d Squadron, 6th Cavalry deployed to Camp Doha, Kuwait (later Ali Al Salem Airbase, Kuwait) to prepare for an eventual move into Iraq. The squadron flew numerous training scenarios and prepared themselves for operations in the desert. In Feb 2003, 2-6 Cav moved from Ali Al Salem to Camp Udari, a forward staging base for the units preparing to move into Iraq. 12 February 2003, they were joined by 6th Squadron, 6th Cavalry, their sister unit, which had just returned from testing their new AH-64D Longbow helicopters at "Victory Strike" in Poland. After months of tedious waiting, the ground portion of the 11th Aviation Group left Camp Udairi at dawn on 21 Mar 03 and reached the breached berm at dusk even though Camp Udairi is only 15 miles from the Iraqi border, drove to An Nasariyah, and another two days up the Euphrates to a location approximately 12 miles southwest of An Najaf, Iraq. This field was named Objective Rams and was the landing site for the helicopters that overflown the convoy on their three-day drive up and landed after a deep strike mission. About four hours after the convoy arrived, the famous "dust storm" moved in. After three days of "dustout" the Group could return to combat.

During the 2003 Attack on Karbala, of the Group's Apache operations, it ran into unexpected and heavy resistance. On March 25, the Republican Guard T-72s, APCs, ZSU-23-4 antiaircraft systems, along with infantrymen armed with AK-47s, aware of the U.S. Army plans, surprised the 34 helicopters with a barrage of PKM, NSV, 23 mm, and perhaps 125 mm tank fire. The route of the raiders was uncovered by the Republican Guard long before they could reach their intended objective. The helicopter strike was repulsed, and one Apache was shot down (according to Iraqi state TV, shot at by a peasant firing an AK-47, although it was likely hit by 23 mm rounds), and all the remainder damaged, some of them taken temporary out of service and at least two being written off. Only seven were still operational after the failed raid. The two crew members of the downed aircraft were captured by the Iraqis.

The Group's leadership lived inside tents erected under old Hardened Aircraft Shelters, one of the turtle shell shaped structures was even converted into a lavish Cavalry dining Hall and Gym named "Guint Hall" thanks to local National Guard engineer unit. The troops lived in GP Medium tents for the duration of their deployment. The 11th Aviation Group continued its mission until Feb 2004, when it redeployed to Storck Barracks in Illesheim, Germany to reset for the next challenge. Both 2-6 and 6-6 were awarded the Meritorious Unit Commendation (MUC) for their actions while deployed.

Liewer, S(2003, 30 Mar). On the Road to Baghdad. Stars and Stripes The Stars and Stripes article describes the ground convoy of Task Force 11th Aviation Group into Iraq from Kuwait. The article describes the unit that was 6 hours behind 11th Aviation Group. It was not known at the time that it was Jessica Lynch's unit.

In late April, the Group again packed up a convoy and rolled through Baghdad north to Balad Air Base, Iraq.

== Inactivation and reactivation ==
Prior to inactivation, the 2nd Squadron, 6th Cavalry deployed to fight in the War in Afghanistan (2001-2021) as part of Operation Enduring Freedom VI. Their deployment lasted from March 2005 until March 2006. The squadron deployed with their AH-64D Longbow Apaches and formed the headquarters of Task Force Sabre at Bagram Airfield. Charlie Troop was attached to Task Force Storm in Kandahar. This was the first deployment of AH-64Ds to Afghanistan. 2–6 Cav was awarded the Meritorious Unit Commendation for their actions while deployed.

The 11th Aviation Group's Casing of the Colors ceremony took place in Germany on 9 June 2005 followed by an official inactivation date of 15 August 2005. At the time it consisted of two attack helicopter battalions, service support units, and a headquarters, and was part of the V Corps.

The unit was reactivated in the United States Army Reserve as the 11th Aviation Command on 16 September 2007 with a colors ceremony at Fort Knox, Kentucky. The presiding officer was Lieutenant General Jack Stultz, Commanding General, United States Army Reserve while the former Commanding General of the 11th Aviation Command was Brigadier General Matthew C. Matia. In October 2009, Brig. Gen. Peter T. Quinn assumed command of the 11th Aviation Command.

On 16 September 2016, the 11th Aviation Command was reorganized and re-designated as the 11th Expeditionary Combat Aviation Brigade, while the command was re-designated as the Army Reserve Aviation Command.

== Units in January 2026 ==
The brigade is a subordinate unit of the Army Reserve Aviation Command. As of January 2026 the brigade consists of the following units:

- 11th Expeditionary Combat Aviation Brigade, at Fort Carson (CO)
  - Headquarters and Headquarters Company, 11th Expeditionary Combat Aviation Brigade, at Fort Carson (CO)
  - 6th Battalion (Fixed Wing), 52nd Aviation Regiment, at Los Alamitos Army Airfield (CA)
    - Headquarters and Headquarters Company, 6th Battalion (Fixed Wing), 52nd Aviation Regiment, at Los Alamitos Army Airfield (CA)
    - Company A, 6th Battalion (Fixed Wing), 52nd Aviation Regiment, at Naval Air Station Joint Reserve Base Fort Worth (TX)
    - Company B, 6th Battalion (Fixed Wing), 52nd Aviation Regiment, at Fort Knox (KY)
    - Company C, 6th Battalion (Fixed Wing), 52nd Aviation Regiment, at Los Alamitos Army Airfield (CA)
      - Detachment 1, Company C, 6th Battalion (Fixed Wing), 52nd Aviation Regiment, at Peterson Space Force Base (CO)
  - 7th Battalion (General Support Aviation), 158th Aviation Regiment, at Fort Hood (TX)
    - Headquarters and Headquarters Company, 7th Battalion (General Support Aviation), 158th Aviation Regiment, at Fort Hood (TX)
    - Company A (CAC), 7th Battalion (General Support Aviation), 158th Aviation Regiment, at Fort Hood (TX)
    - Company B (Heavy Lift), 7th Battalion (General Support Aviation), 158th Aviation Regiment, at New Century AirCenter (KS)
    - Company C (MEDEVAC), 7th Battalion (General Support Aviation), 158th Aviation Regiment, at Fort Carson (CO)
    - Company D (AVUM), 7th Battalion (General Support Aviation), 158th Aviation Regiment, at New Century AirCenter (KS)
      - Detachment 1, Company D (AVUM), 7th Battalion (General Support Aviation), 158th Aviation Regiment, at Fort Carson (CO)
      - Detachment 2, Company D (AVUM), 7th Battalion (General Support Aviation), 158th Aviation Regiment, at Los Alamitos Army Airfield (CA)
    - Company E (Forward Support), 7th Battalion (General Support Aviation), 158th Aviation Regiment, at Fort Hood (TX)
      - Detachment 1, Company E (Forward Support), 7th Battalion (General Support Aviation), 158th Aviation Regiment, at Fort Carson (CO)
      - Detachment 2, Company E (Forward Support), 7th Battalion (General Support Aviation), 158th Aviation Regiment, at Los Alamitos Army Airfield (CA)
    - Company F (ATS), 7th Battalion (General Support Aviation), 158th Aviation Regiment, at Fort Carson (CO)
    - Company G (MEDEVAC), 7th Battalion (General Support Aviation), 158th Aviation Regiment, at Los Alamitos Army Airfield (CA)
  - 90th Aviation Support Battalion, at Naval Air Station Joint Reserve Base Fort Worth (TX)
    - Headquarters and Headquarters Company, 90th Aviation Support Battalion, at Naval Air Station Joint Reserve Base Fort Worth (TX)
    - Company A, 90th Aviation Support Battalion, at Naval Air Station Joint Reserve Base Fort Worth (TX)
    - Company B, 90th Aviation Support Battalion, at Naval Air Station Joint Reserve Base Fort Worth (TX)
    - Company C, 90th Aviation Support Battalion, at Naval Air Station Joint Reserve Base Fort Worth (TX)

Abbreviations: CAC — Command Aviation Company; MEDEVAC — Medical evacuation; AVUM — Aviation Unit Maintenance; ATS — Air Traffic Services

The brigade's 1st Battalion, 158th Aviation Regiment (Assault), which was based at Aviation Support Facility Conroe in Texas, is disbanding and will deactivate on 15 September 2026.

== Campaign participation credit ==
- Vietnam:
  - Defense;
  - Counteroffensive;
  - Counteroffensive, Phase II;
  - Counteroffensive, Phase III;
  - Tet Counteroffensive;
  - Counteroffensive, Phase IV;
  - Counteroffensive, Phase V;
- Counteroffensive, Phase VI;
  - Tet 69/Counteroffensive;
- Summer-Fall 1969;
  - Winter-Spring 1970;
  - Sanctuary Counteroffensive;
  - Counteroffensive, Phase VII;
  - Consolidation I;
  - Consolidation II;
  - Cease-Fire
- Southwest Asia:
  - Defense of Saudi Arabia;
  - Liberation and Defense of Kuwait;
  - Cease-Fire
  - Operation Inherent Resolve (OIR) 2021–2022

== Unit decorations ==
- Presidential Unit Citation (Army) for PLEIKU PROVINCE
- Valorous Unit Award for FISH HOOK
- Meritorious Unit Commendation (Army) for VIETNAM 1965–1966
- Army Superior Unit Award for TASK FORCE EAGLE 1995–1996
- Republic of Vietnam Cross of Gallantry with Palm for VIETNAM 1965–1969
- Republic of Vietnam Cross of Gallantry with Palm for VIETNAM 1969–1970
- Republic of Vietnam Cross of Gallantry with Palm for VIETNAM 1970–1971
- Republic of Vietnam Cross of Gallantry with Palm for VIETNAM 1971–1972
- Republic of Vietnam Civil Action Honor Medal, First Class for VIETNAM 1969–1970
