= Ishaqi =

Ishaqi ناحية الإسحاقي
- Location within Iraq
- Coordinates: 34.2833°N 43.7667°E
- Country: Iraq
- Province: Saladin Governorate
- District: Balad District
- Time zone: UTC+3 (GMT+3)

Ishaqi (also known as "Al Ishaqi") (Arabic: ناحية الإسحاقي) is a small town in the Balad District of the Saladin Governorate of Iraq, about 60 miles (96 km) north of Baghdad.

== War crimes ==
=== 1st 2006 incident ===
In March 2006 Iraqi police reported that American troops had executed 11 people in Ishaqi after capturing them in a raid, including a 75-year-old woman and a 6-month-old baby. New footage of the event's aftermath was released in June 2006, sparking an investigation of the event. The US forces were later cleared of wrongdoing by a US military probe, sparking protests from the Iraqi government, which vowed to continue its own investigation.

=== 2nd 2006 incident ===
In December 2006 the US military conducted an air raid on Ishaqi. US-led coalition forces said they were looking through several buildings near Lake Tharthar in the province of Salah ad Din when Al-Qaeda-linked militants launched an attack. The U.S. military then said coalition troops returned fire, killing two of the insurgents. As the firefight continued, troops called in air strikes. The U.S. military said 20 Al-Qaeda insurgents, including two women, were killed in the raid.

Local officials in Jalameda claimed there were actually 17 victims and that they included five men, six women, and five children. Locals of the area claiming to be relatives showed the children's bodies to journalists. Al Jazeera claimed to have exclusive footage that confirms the presence of children among the victims of the US air raid.

Iraqi reaction included mourners firing into the air overnight as they buried the victims of the raid. Hundreds of chanting residents of Jalameda marched through Ishaqi overnight, firing shots and carrying banners that read: "The people of Ishaqi condemn the mass killing by the occupation forces". Adnan al-Dulaimi, head of the biggest Sunni political bloc in parliament, said, "We ask the Americans to be merciful. They kill civilians alleging they are terrorists. Ishaqi is a catastrophe."

The Agence France Presse news agency passed on its own photographs of the dead children to Lieutenant Colonel Christopher Garver, a US military spokesman, asking for an explanation on the latest allegations. Garver replied, "We've checked with the troops who conducted this operation - there were no children found among the terrorists killed." Garver continued, "I see nothing in the photos that indicates those children were in the houses that our forces received fire from and subsequently destroyed with the air strike."

== See also ==
- Haditha
