= 228th Aviation Regiment =

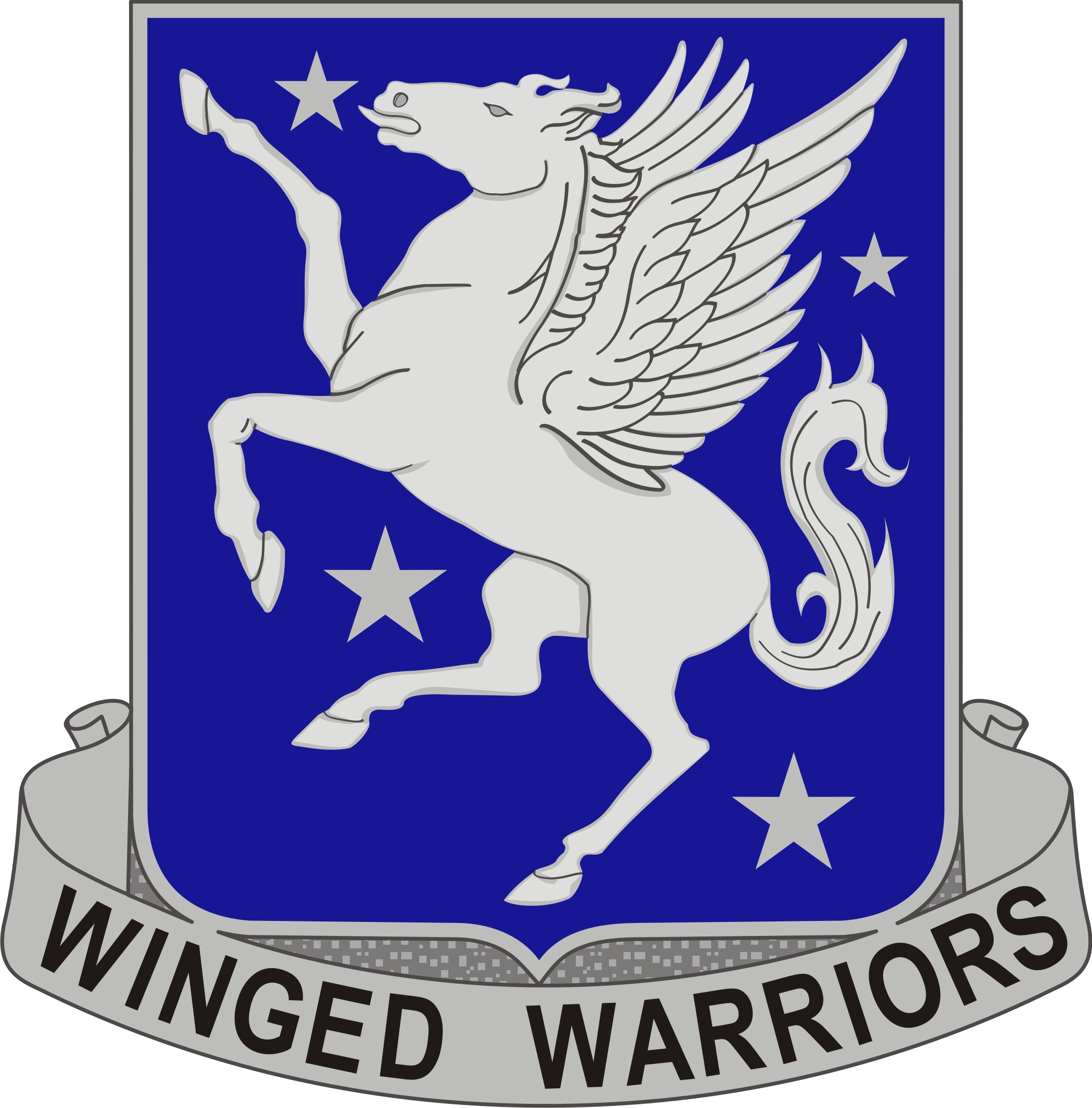
- Distinctive Unit Insignia
- Country: United States
- Branch: United States Army Aviation Branch
- Type: Aviation

Aircraft flown
- Beechcraft C-12U Huron; Sikorsky UH-60L Black Hawk; Boeing CH-47 Chinook; Sikorsky HH-60L Black Hawk

The 228th Aviation Regiment is an aviation regiment of the U.S. Army.

== Structure ==
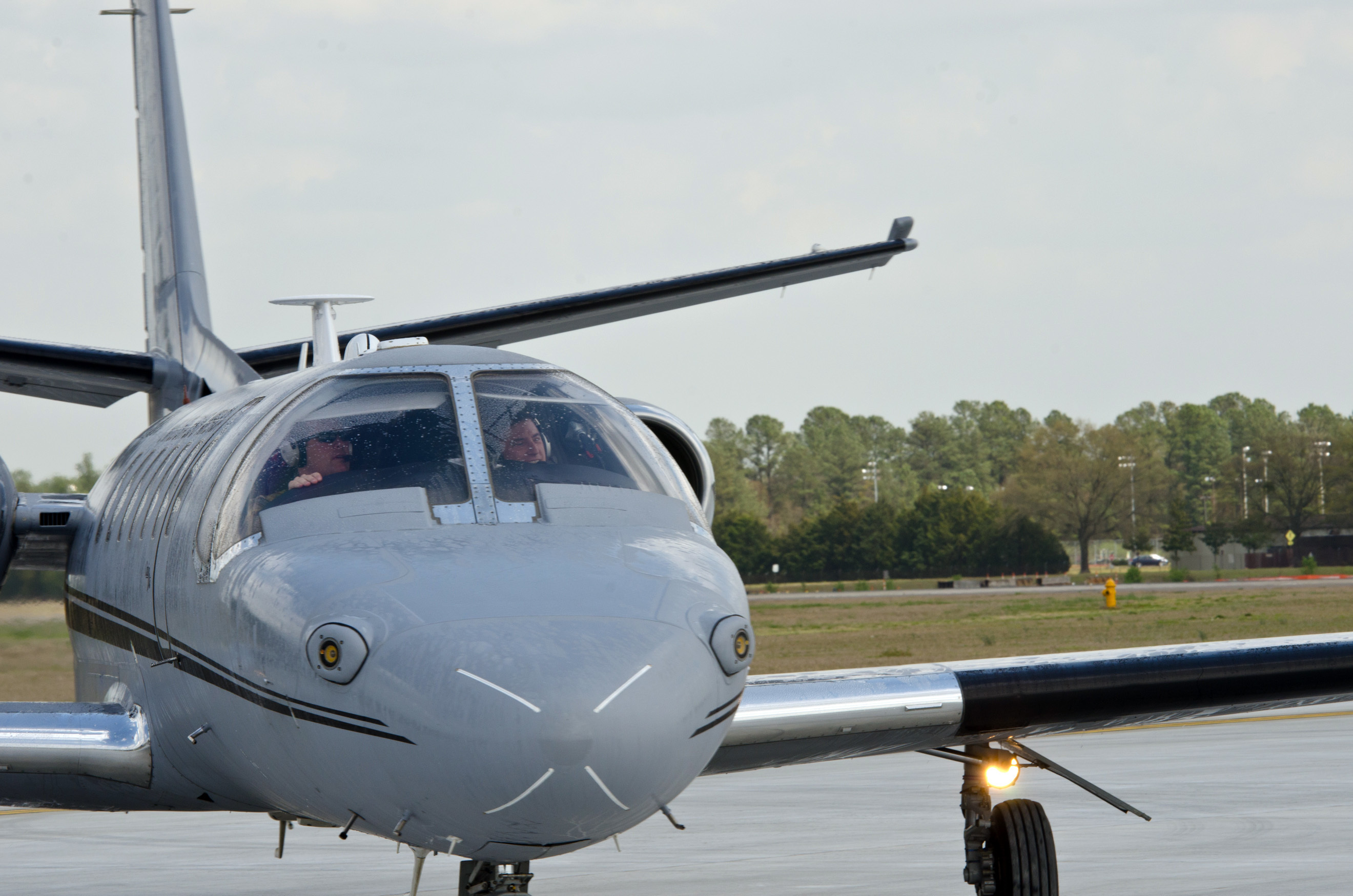
U.S. Army Reserve Soldiers assigned to C Company 2nd Battalion, 228th Aviation Regiment

- 1st Battalion using the Sikorsky UH-60L Black Hawk, Boeing CH-47F Chinook and Sikorsky HH-60L Black Hawk
- 2nd Battalion
  - Company A using the Beechcraft C-12U Huron at Joint Base McGuire–Dix–Lakehurst
