= Forward Operating Base Fenty =

FOB Fenty
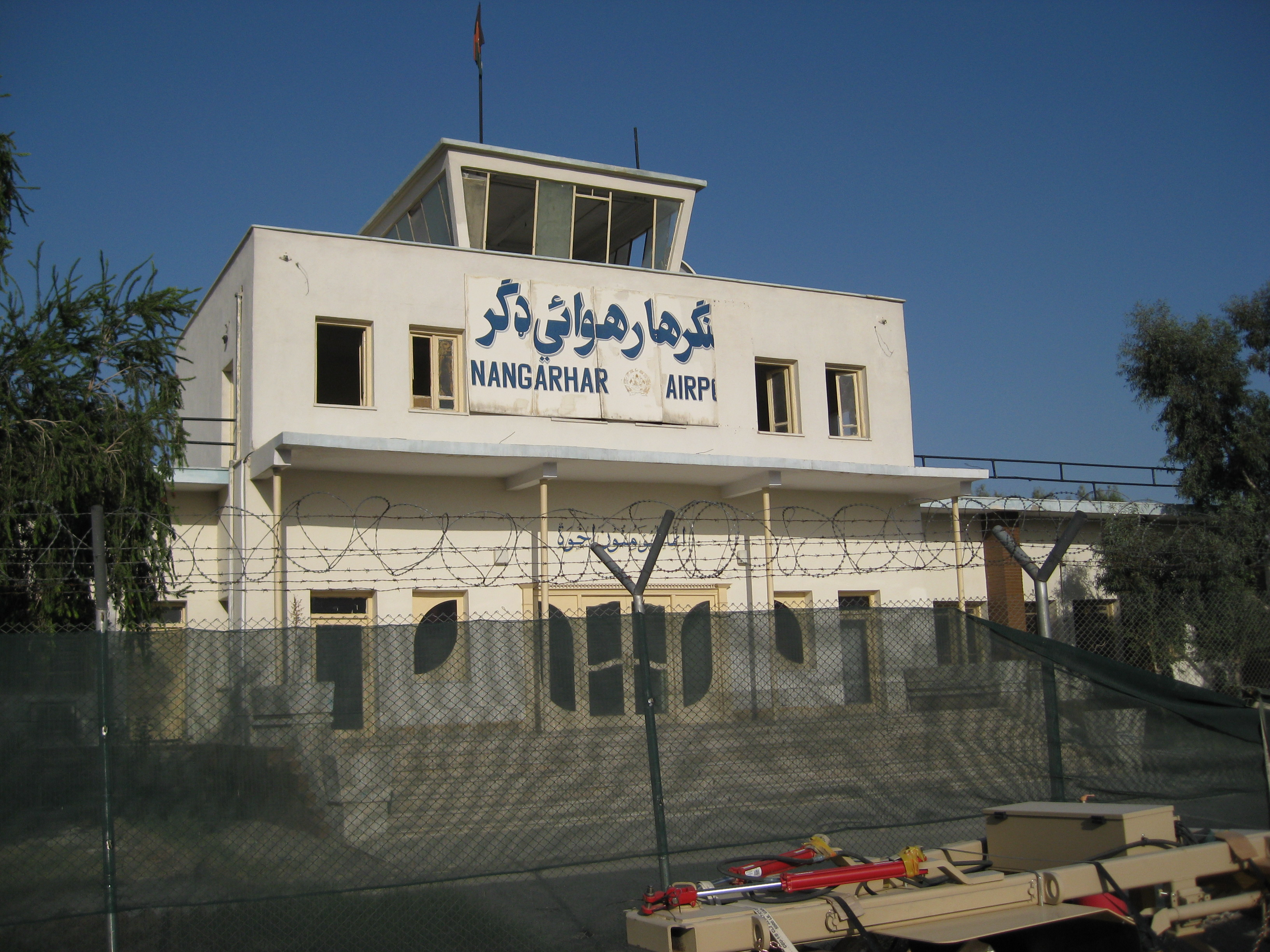
- Control tower of the Jalalabad Airport in Nangarhar
- IATA: JAA; ICAO: OAJL

Summary
- Airport type: Military
- Owner: Afghanistan
- Operator: United States Army; United States Air Force; Afghan Air Force; ISAF
- Location: Jalalabad, Nangarhar Province
- Elevation AMSL: 1,840 ft / 561 m
- Coordinates: 34°24′01″N 70°29′54″E

Map
- Location of airport in Afghanistan

Runways
Direction	Length		Surface
Direction	ft	m	Surface
13/31	6,480	1,975	Asphalt
- Source: Landings.com, AIP Afghanistan

Forward Operating Base (FOB) Fenty was a military base built around Jalalabad Airport.

== Namesake ==
The base was named after Lt. Col. Joseph J. Fenty Jr. LTC Fenty received his commission for the University of North Carolina- Charlotte ROTC program in 1986 as an Infantry Lieutenant. LTC Fenty was a founding member and first commanding officer of 3rd Squadron, 71st Cavalry (Recon) building the organization from the ground up. He took command 16 September 2004, trained the unit, and led the Titans on their first deployment to Afghanistan, in support of OEF VII. On 5 May 2006, nearing the end of Operation Mountain Lion, LTC Fenty personally oversaw a high-risk night extraction of one of his Cavalry scout teams located high in the mountains above Chalas Valley. During the extraction on the hostile rugged terrain, the Boeing CH-47 Chinook helicopter that he was in crashed and all aboard perished.

== Units ==
Ground

- 4th Brigade Combat Team, 4th Infantry Division until December 2012.
- 1st Brigade Combat Team, 101st Airborne Division from December 2012.
- 2nd Brigade Combat Team, 1st Cavalry Division from June 2013 until March 2014.
- 1st Squadron, 108th Cavalry Regiment, 48th Infantry Brigade Combat Team from December 2018 until June 2019

Aviation

- April 2010
  - 10th Combat Aviation Brigade (TF Lighthorse)
    - Charlie Company, 4th Battalion, 3rd Aviation Regiment
    - 3rd Squadron, 17th Cavalry Regiment
- 6th Squadron, 6th Cavalry Regiment between 2010 and 2011.
- 2nd Squadron, 17th Cavalry Regiment between 2012 and 2013.
- October 2013 - December 2013
  - 10th Combat Aviation Brigade, (TF Tigershark)
    - Unknown Company, 1st Attack Reconnaissance Battalion, 10th Aviation Regiment (AH-64)
    - Unknown Company, 1st Attack Reconnaissance Battalion (UH-60L/M)
    - Company C, 2nd Battalion (UH-60M)
    - Unknown Company, 3rd General Support Aviation Battalion, (CH-47F)
    - B Troop, 6th Squadron, 6th Cavalry Regiment (OH-58D)
    - 1st Air Cavalry Brigade, 1st Cavalry Division (AH-64)
- December 2013 - October 2014
  - 159th Combat Aviation Brigade
- October 2014 - Unknown
  - 82nd Combat Aviation Brigade
    - Company D, 1st Attack Reconnaissance Battalion
- June 2016 - April 2017
  - 1st Infantry Division, Combat Aviation Brigade (TF Gunfighters)
    - 1st Battalion, 1st Aviation Regiment
- April 2017 - November 2017
  - 16th Combat Aviation Brigade (TF Tigershark)
    - 1st Battalion, 229th Attack Reconnaissance Battalion
- September 2018 - February 2019
  - Combat Aviation Brigade, 101st Airborne Division (TF No Mercy)
    - 1st Battalion, 101st Aviation Regiment
- February 2019 - October 2019
  - Combat Aviation Brigade, 1st Armored Division (TF Heavy Cav)
    - 1st Armored Division CAB (United States) 3-6 ARS
      - 2-501st GSAB, Charlie Company, 2nd Platoon, Burro Dustoff
