= William A. Ryan III =

US Army major general (born 1972)

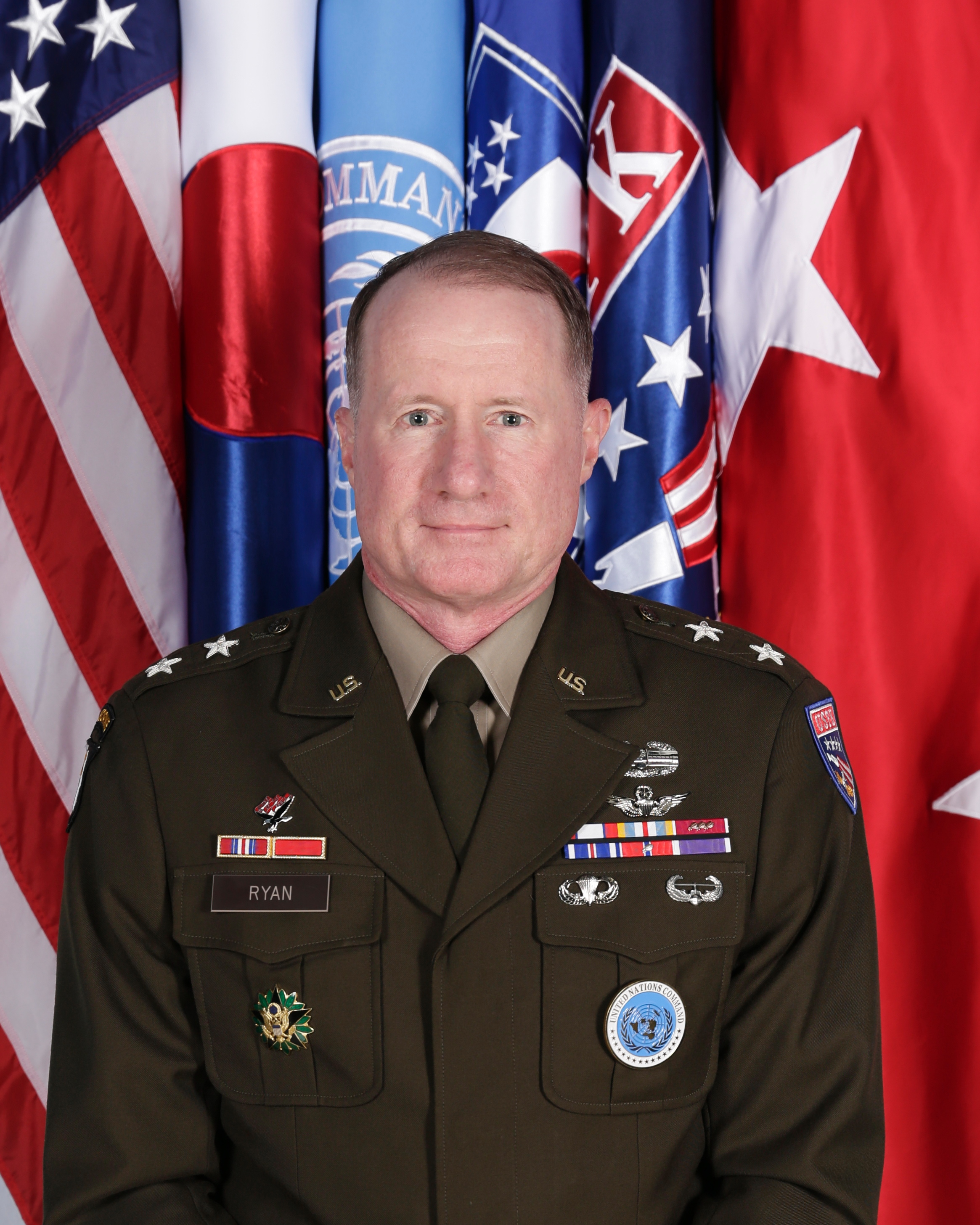
- Official portrait, 2025
- Born: 1972 (age 53–54); Chicago, Illinois, US
- Alma mater: United States Military Academy; Joint Advanced Warfighting School; National Defense University; Georgetown University
- Spouse: Lorry Ann Sykes (m. 1999)
- Children: 2
- Military career
- Service: United States Army
- Service years: 1994–Present
- Rank: Major General
- Unit: United States Army Aviation Branch
- Commands: Company A, 3rd Battalion, 101st Aviation Regiment; 1st Battalion, 101st Aviation Regiment; 16th Combat Aviation Brigade; First Army Division West; First Army
- Wars: Iraq War; War in Afghanistan
- Awards: Defense Superior Service Medal; Legion of Merit (4); Distinguished Flying Cross; Bronze Star Medal (6); Purple Heart

William A. Ryan III (born 1972) is a career officer in the United States Army. A 1994 graduate of the United States Military Academy at West Point, he is an Aviation officer and a veteran of the Iraq War and the War in Afghanistan. Ryan attained the rank of major general as commander of First Army Division West in 2023 and served as interim commander of First Army in 2024. In 2025, Ryan was assigned as director of operations for United Nations Command and Republic of Korea/US Combined Forces Command. His major awards and decorations include the Defense Superior Service Medal, multiple awards of the Legion of Merit, and the Distinguished Flying Cross.

== Early career ==
William Aloysius Ryan III was born in Chicago in 1972, the son of Colonel and Mrs. William A. Ryan II. In 1990, he graduated from Lakes High School in Lakewood, Washington. Ryan graduated from the United States Military Academy at West Point in 1994 with a Bachelor of Science degree in Mathematics and was commissioned as a second lieutenant of Aviation.

After completion of the Aviation Officer Basic Course, Ryan's initial assignments with the 101st Airborne Division included attack platoon leader, liaison officer, and battalion personnel staff officer (S-1) for 2nd Battalion, 101st Aviation Regiment. He then served as aide-de-camp to the commanding general of the United States Army Aviation Center of Excellence, after which he returned to the 101st Airborne Division to serve as a brigade S-1. His next assignment was commander of Company A, 3rd Battalion, 101st Aviation Regiment.

=== Family ===
In 1999, Ryan married Lorry Ann Sykes. They are the parents of son Liam and daughter Campbell.

== Continued career ==
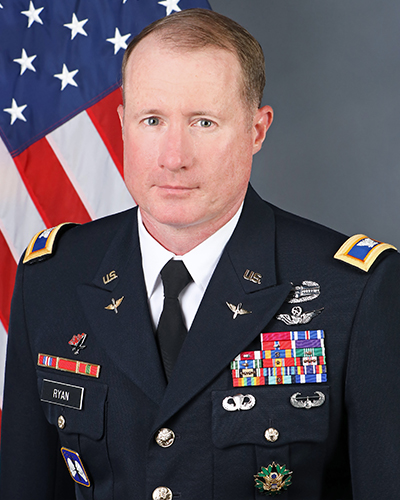
Ryan as a colonel in 2018

Ryan's subsequent assignments included plans officer for the 101st Combat Aviation Brigade, and aviation assignments officer at the Human Resources Command. He then returned to 3-101st Aviation, where he served as plans, operations, and training officer (S-3) and executive officer. He subsequently served as aide-de-camp to Secretary of the Army Pete Geren, chief of plans, operations, and training – Aviation (G-3 Aviation) for the 101st Airborne Division, and deputy commander of the 101st Combat Aviation Brigade. Ryan commanded 1st Battalion, 101st Aviation Regiment from 2011 to 2013. From 2013 to 2014, he was assigned as senior aviation trainer at the Fort Irwin National Training Center. From 2015 to 2018, Ryan commanded the 16th Combat Aviation Brigade. He was then assigned as deputy commander of the Aviation Center of Excellence.

=== Deployment history ===
Ryan's deployment history includes Operation Enduring Freedom I (2002), X (2010–2011), and XII-XIII (2012–2013). He is also a veteran of Operation Iraqi Freedom I (2003) and V-VII (2005–2006). In addition, he served in Operation Resolute Support and Operation Freedom's Sentinel (2017, 2020–2021).

=== Military education ===
In addition to the Aviation Officer Basic Course, Ryan's military education includes:

- Armor Officer Advanced Course
- Combined Arms and Services Staff School, United States Army Command and General Staff College
- Joint Advanced Warfighting School, Joint Forces Staff College
- Army War College Fellow, Stanford University
- National Defense University, master's degree in Campaign Planning and National Security Strategy

In addition to his military education, Ryan completed a master's degree in Policy Management at Georgetown University.

== Later career ==
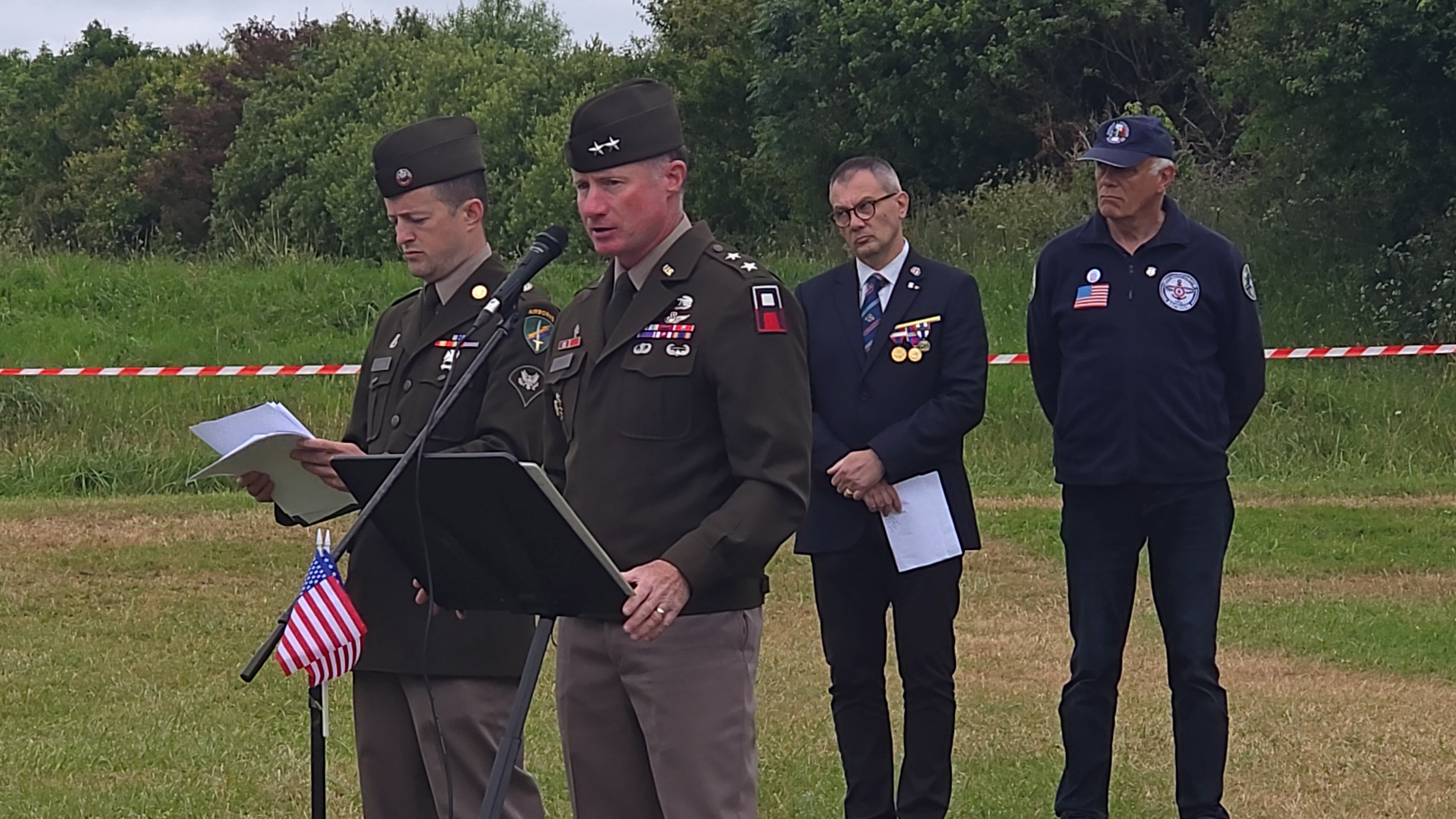
First Army interim commander Ryan speaks in Normandy in 2024

In 2019, Ryan was assigned as the 7th Infantry Division's deputy commander for support, and he was subsequently assigned as I Corps chief of staff. From May 2020 to May 2021, he served as senior advisor to Afghanistan's Ministry of Defense, and he was promoted to brigadier general in October 2020. From June to September 2021, he was assigned as a special assistant to the deputy commander of I Corps, and in October 2021 he took over as deputy commander. From August 2023 to June 2025, Ryan was commander of First Army Division West, and he acted as commander of First Army on an interim basis in 2024. He was promoted to major general in December 2023. In July 2025, Ryan was assigned as director of operations for United Nations Command and Republic of Korea/US Combined Forces Command.

== Awards ==
Ryan's major awards include:

- Defense Superior Service Medal
- Legion of Merit with three bronze oak leaf clusters
- Distinguished Flying Cross
- Bronze Star Medal with silver oak leaf cluster
- Meritorious Service Medal with silver oak leaf cluster
- Air Medal with numeral 3
- Parachutist Badge
- Air Assault Badge
- Combat Action Badge
- Army Staff Identification Badge
- Master Army Aviator Badge

In addition to his army awards, Ryan is a recipient of the Army Aviation Association of America's Honorable Order of St. Michael (Silver).
