= 159th Combat Aviation Brigade =

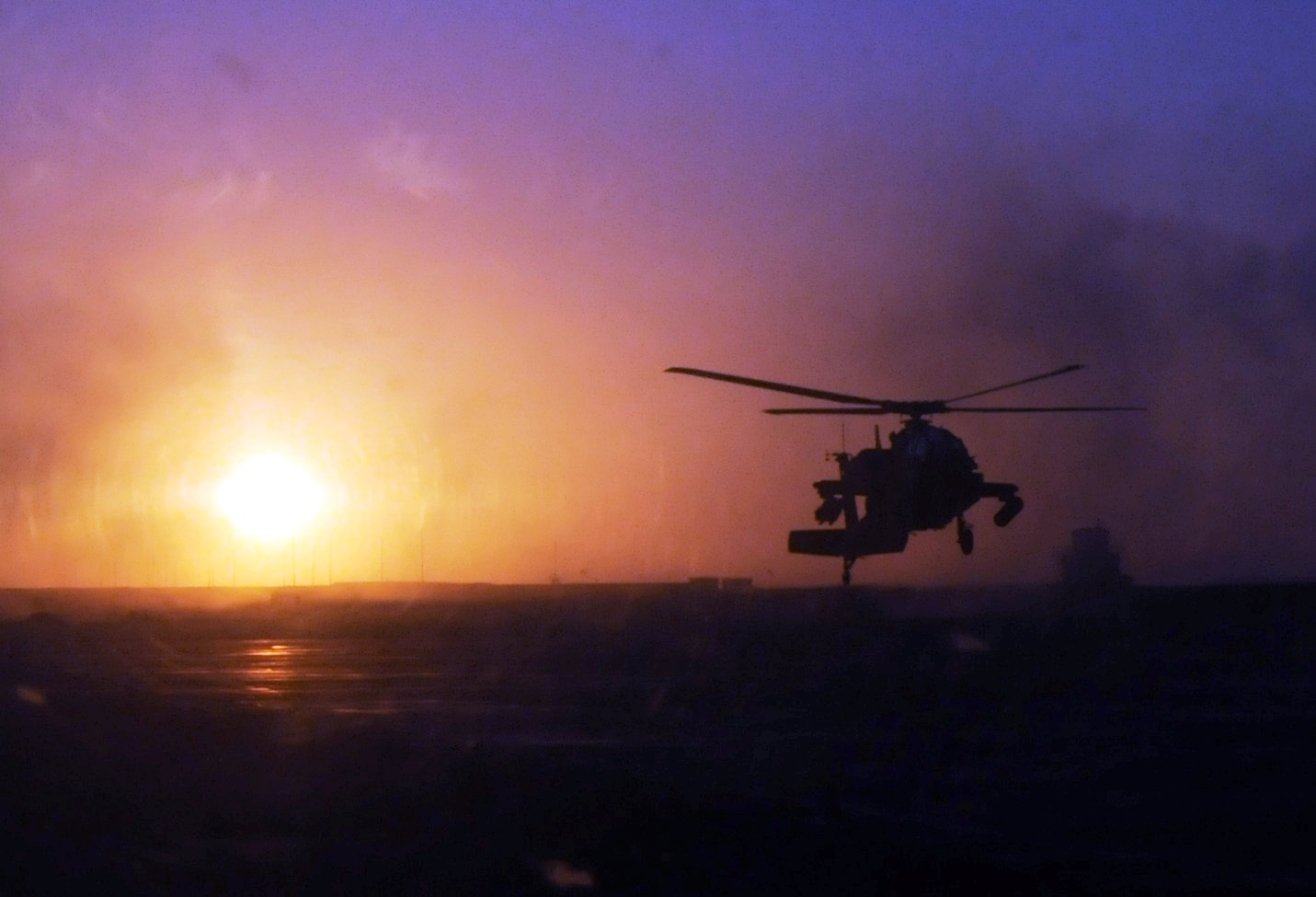
- An AH-64 from the 159th CAB at sunset
- Active: 1992–2015
- Country: United States of America
- Allegiance: United States Army
- Branch: U.S. Army Aviation
- Type: Combat aviation brigade
- Part of: 101st Airborne Division
- Garrison/HQ: Fort Campbell, Kentucky, U.S.

Insignia
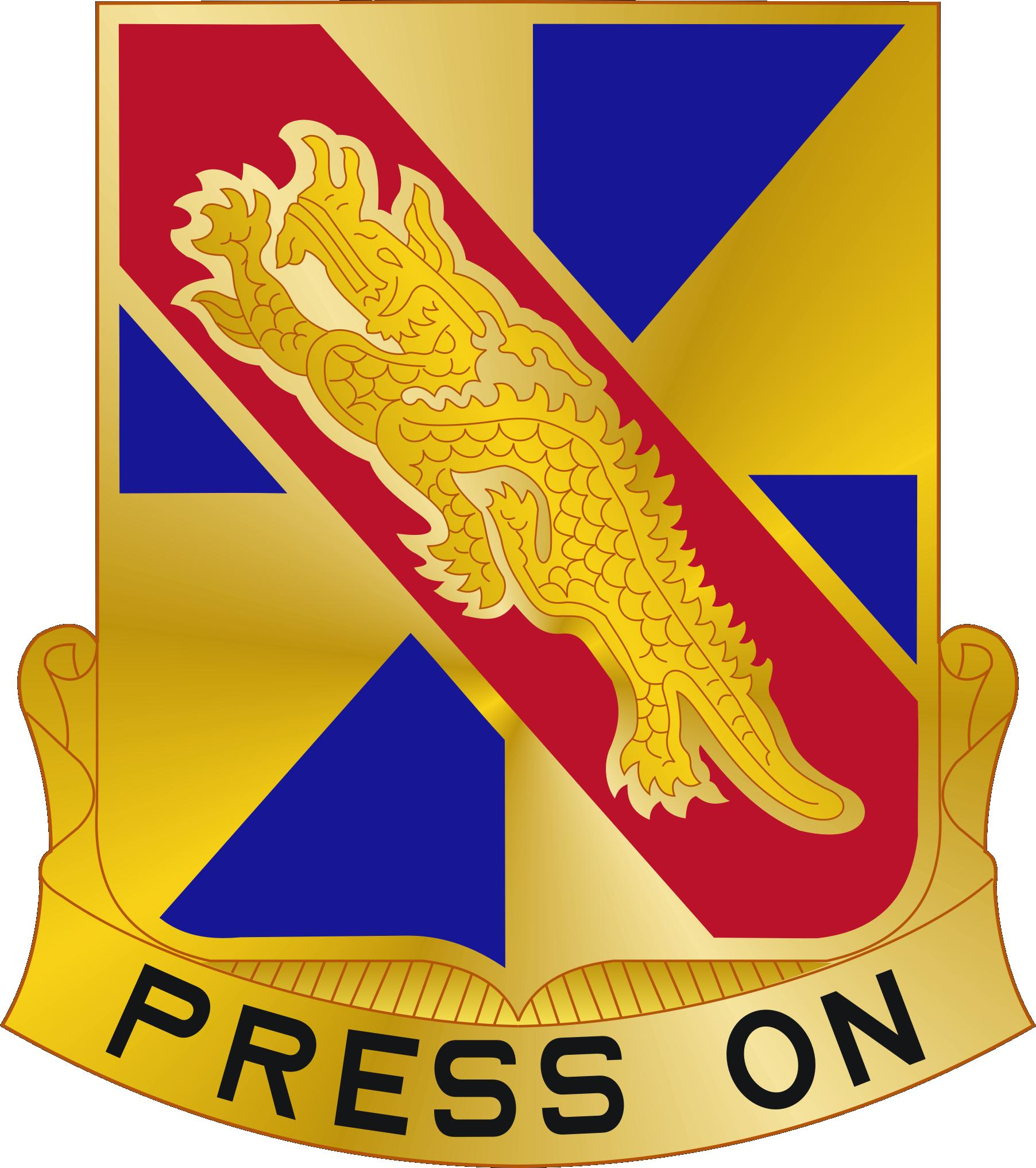
- Distinctive Unit Insignia

- Background Trimming

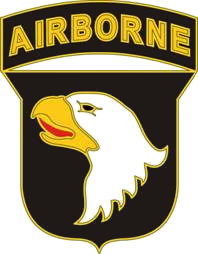
- Combat Service Identification Badge

Aircraft flown
- Attack helicopter: AH-64
- Cargo helicopter: CH-47
- Multirole helicopter: UH-60
- Observation helicopter: OH-58

The 159th Combat Aviation Brigade (CAB) formerly supported the 101st Airborne Division (Air Assault), and was stationed at Fort Campbell, Kentucky. While active, 159th CAB made the 101st Airborne Division the only US Army Division with two organic aviation brigades, and currently the 101st CAB is the only CAB supporting the unit at Fort Campbell. The 159th CAB was inactivated on 15 May 2015.

The lineage of the 159th Aviation Brigade is separate from that of the Vietnam-era 159th Aviation Battalion and the later 159th Aviation Regiment.

== Composition ==
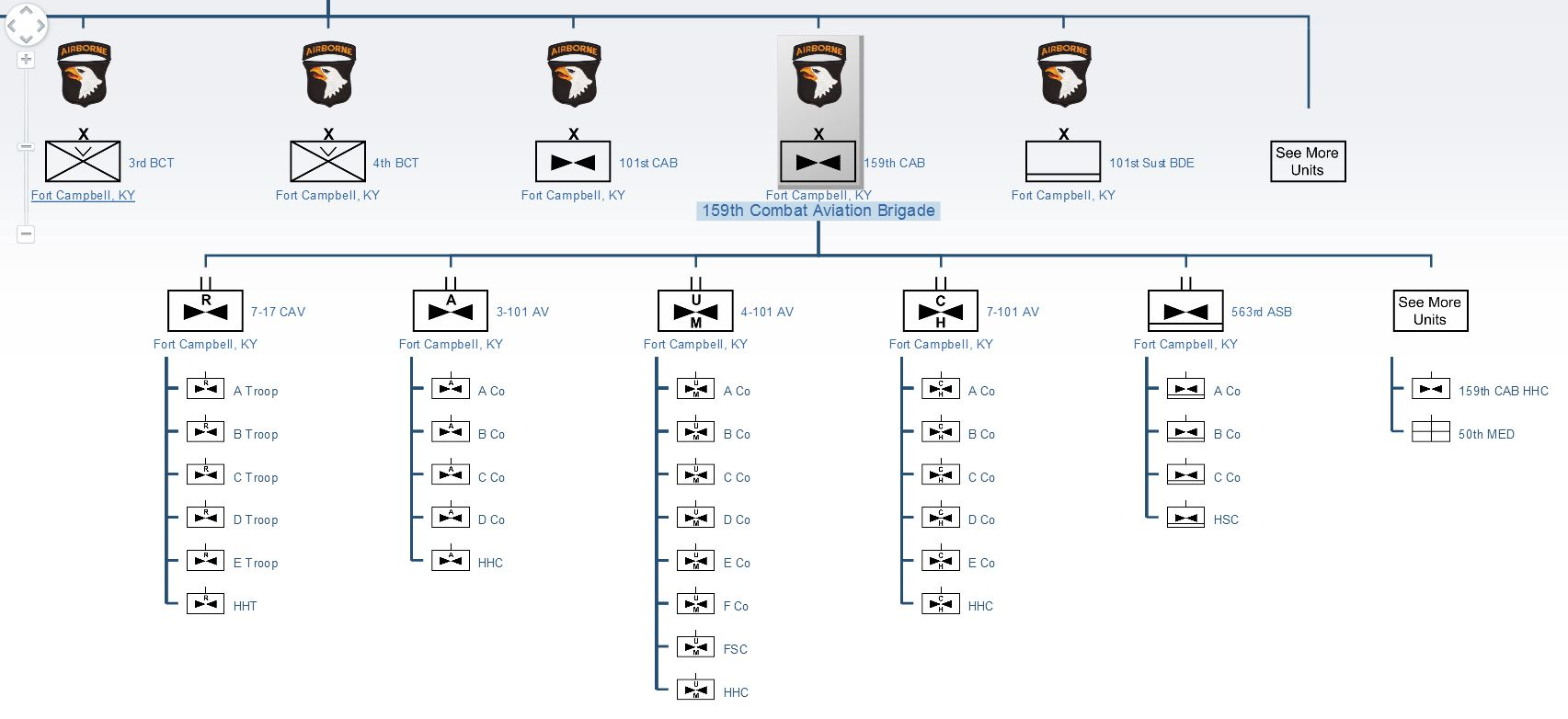
Final Organization of 159th CAB

- Headquarters and Headquarters Company, 159th CAB ("Dragonlords")
- 7th Squadron, 17th Cavalry Regiment ("Pale Horse")
- 3rd Battalion, 101st Aviation Regiment ("Eagle Attack")
- 4th Battalion, 101st Aviation Regiment ("Wings of the Eagle")
- 7th Battalion, 101st Aviation Regiment ("Eagle Lift")
- 563rd Aviation Support Battalion ("Keep Them Fighting")

== Formation and initial deployments ==
=== The Vietnam-era 159th Aviation ===
The 159th Aviation Battalion (Assault Helicopter) was a Vietnam War-era heavy lift helicopter unit formed on 1 July 1968 from the assets of the 308th Aviation Battalion (Combat). The spiritual ancestor (separate lineage) to the 159th CAB was organized as the medium and heavy lift Assault Helicopter Battalion of the 101st Airborne Division, and composed of three Boeing CH-47 Chinook companies (Pachyderms - A Company; Varsity - B Company; Playtex - C Co) and 1 Sikorsky CH-54 Tarhe company (Hurricanes). In the modern formation, only "Varsity" Company remained as Company B, 7th Battalion, 101st Aviation Regiment, 159th CAB.

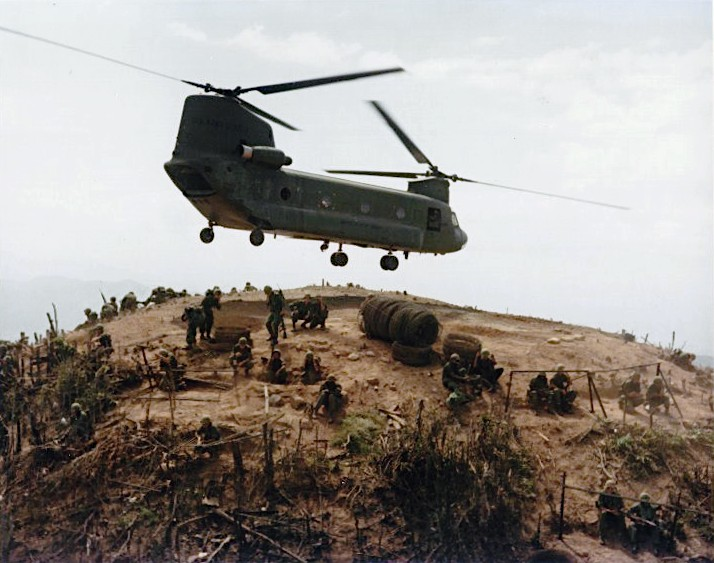
Firebase Resupply in Vietnam

From January 1969 through February 1972, the battalion provided lift support to the 101st Airborne. The unit conducted airmobile artillery raids, troop movements, flare drops, fire-base insertions and extractions, IFR airdrops, and flight support and aircraft recovery missions. The 159th Aviation Battalion received the Valorous Unit Award for services in the Republic of Vietnam, 1 January 1970 through May 1971. In February 1972, the 159th Aviation Battalion returned to Fort Campbell, Kentucky as the only CH-47 Chinook battalion in the United States Army.

In November 1987, the 159th Aviation Battalion headquarters was inactivated at Fort Campbell and the 159th Aviation Regiment was activated under the new U.S. Army regimental system at Fort Bragg, North Carolina. Later, the unit would be redesignated as 4th Battalion, 159th Aviation Regiment and was activated at Kitzingen, Germany, and then relocated to Giebelstadt, Germany. From this point on, the 159th Aviation Regiment would have no further affiliation with either Fort Campbell, the 101st Airborne, or the 159th Aviation Brigade - the 159th Aviation Regiment continues to exist as a separate unit affiliated with 12th Aviation Brigade.

=== 101st Aviation Regiment ===
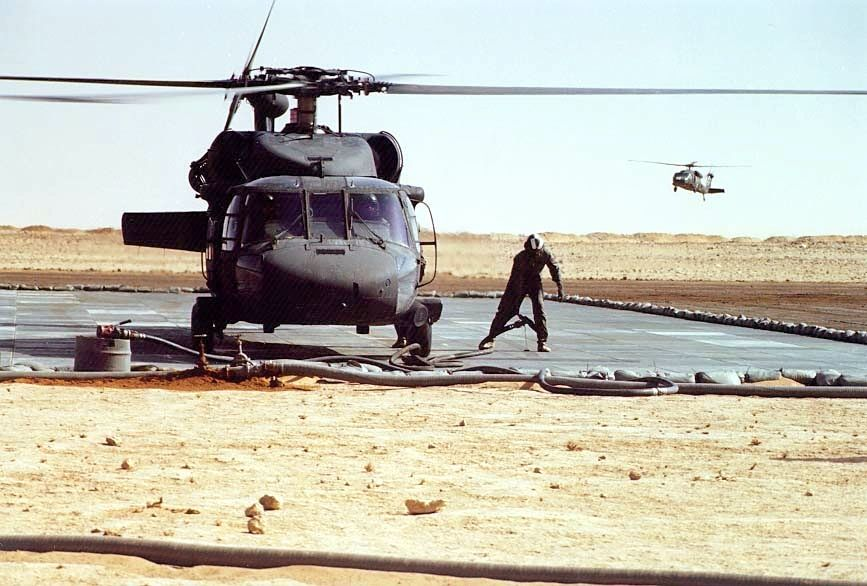
101st FARP in the Gulf War

Meanwhile, the same 1987 reorganization that removed the 159th Aviation Battalion lineage left nine active aviation battalions which had existed beneath it at Fort Campbell. As such, these units were assigned lineage to the 101st Aviation Regiment, and initially reformed under the headquarters of the 101st Aviation Brigade.

As originally formed, Sikorsky UH-60 Black Hawks were in the 4th, 5th and 9th Battalions, 101st Aviation; Bell UH-1 Iroquois were in the 6th Battalion, 101st Aviation; CH-47D Chinooks were in the 7th Battalion, 101st Aviation; and Boeing AH-64 Apache were in 1st, 2nd and 3rd Battalion, 101st Aviation. Aviation support was provided by 8th Battalion, 101st Aviation Regiment.

Serious flaws with this arrangement would become apparent during the First Gulf War, as the resulting nine Battalion unit was the size of some regiments yet lacked an adequately sized staff element, headquarters, or officer rank to control such a large unit over a wide area. As a result, the 101st Airborne headquarters considered breaking the 101st Aviation Brigade in half and establishing a second headquarters.

=== The 159th Aviation Brigade ===
On 9 October 1997, the largest aviation brigade in the Army split nine battalions into two brigades, the 101st Aviation Brigade (Attack) and the 159th Aviation Brigade (Assault). Between 1997 and 2001, the Brigade deployed units to Bosnia, Kosovo, Trinidad and Tobago, and Central America.

== Post 9/11 ==
=== 2002 Afghanistan deployment ===
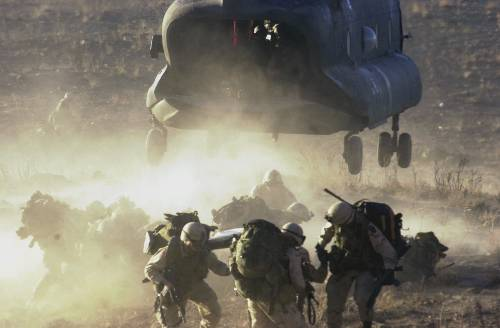
7-101 Chinook, 159th Aviation Brigade during Operation Anaconda

Following 9/11, elements of the 4-101st (Blackhawk), and 7-101st (Chinook) Aviation Battalions, 159th Aviation Brigade deployed to Afghanistan in support of Operation Enduring Freedom. Deploying 29 January 2002 for OEF, 159th elements prepared and strategically deployed 5 UH-60L Blackhawk aircraft and 6.5 aircrews to Kandahar, Afghanistan. 159th Brigade also deployed 8 UH-60L Blackhawk and 13 CH-47 Chinook aircraft to Bagram.

The unit deployed another 5 UH-60L aircraft to Bagram Air Force Base, Afghanistan on 3 May 2002. In September 2002, two elements of A Company, 4-101st Aviation Regiment redeployed from Afghanistan where they supported OEF in the fight against the Taliban.

==== Operation Anaconda ====
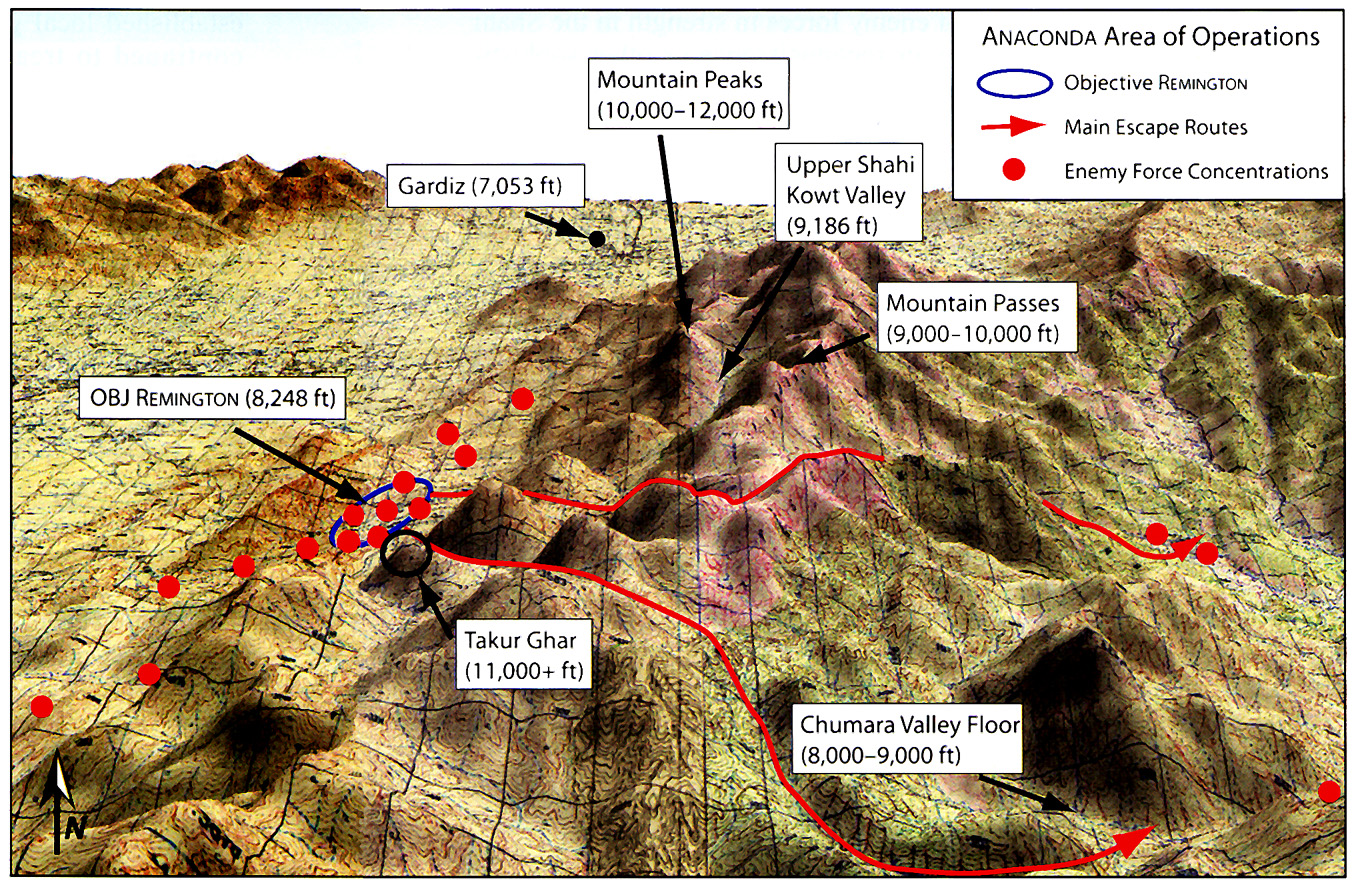
Unforgiving Terrain of the Shah-e-Kot Valley

...we determined that the most dangerous and critical part of the operation was getting the force on the ground. We knew we could kill the enemy if they showed themselves, so we thought the greater risk was crashing a helicopter in the unfamiliar and harsh terrain at 9,000 feet of altitude.

— Lieutenant Colonel Jim Larson, 187th Infantry (Rakkasans) Executive Officer

Chinook and Blackhawk aircraft from 159th Aviation Brigade provided direct lift support for Operation Anaconda. U.S. Army intelligence had located a large number of Taliban and al Qaeda personnel operating in the Shah-e-Kot Valley, near the Pakistani border. Within the valley were the three villages of Sherkhankhel, Babukhel, and Marzak. Operation Anaconda would block Taliban and al Qaeda forces inside the valley where they could be destroyed before escaping into Pakistan.

159th Aviators began pre-flight checks for departure at 4:30 am, 2 March 2002. The air mission consisted of eight 7-101 CH-47 aircraft divided into two flights of four, carrying infantry from the 101st Airborne and 10th Mountain Divisions. As resupply was not guaranteed at the time, the onboard infantry were heavily laden with ample food, water, cold-weather clothing, night-vision and communications equipment in addition to weapons and ammunition. Some individuals carried a hundred pounds or more.

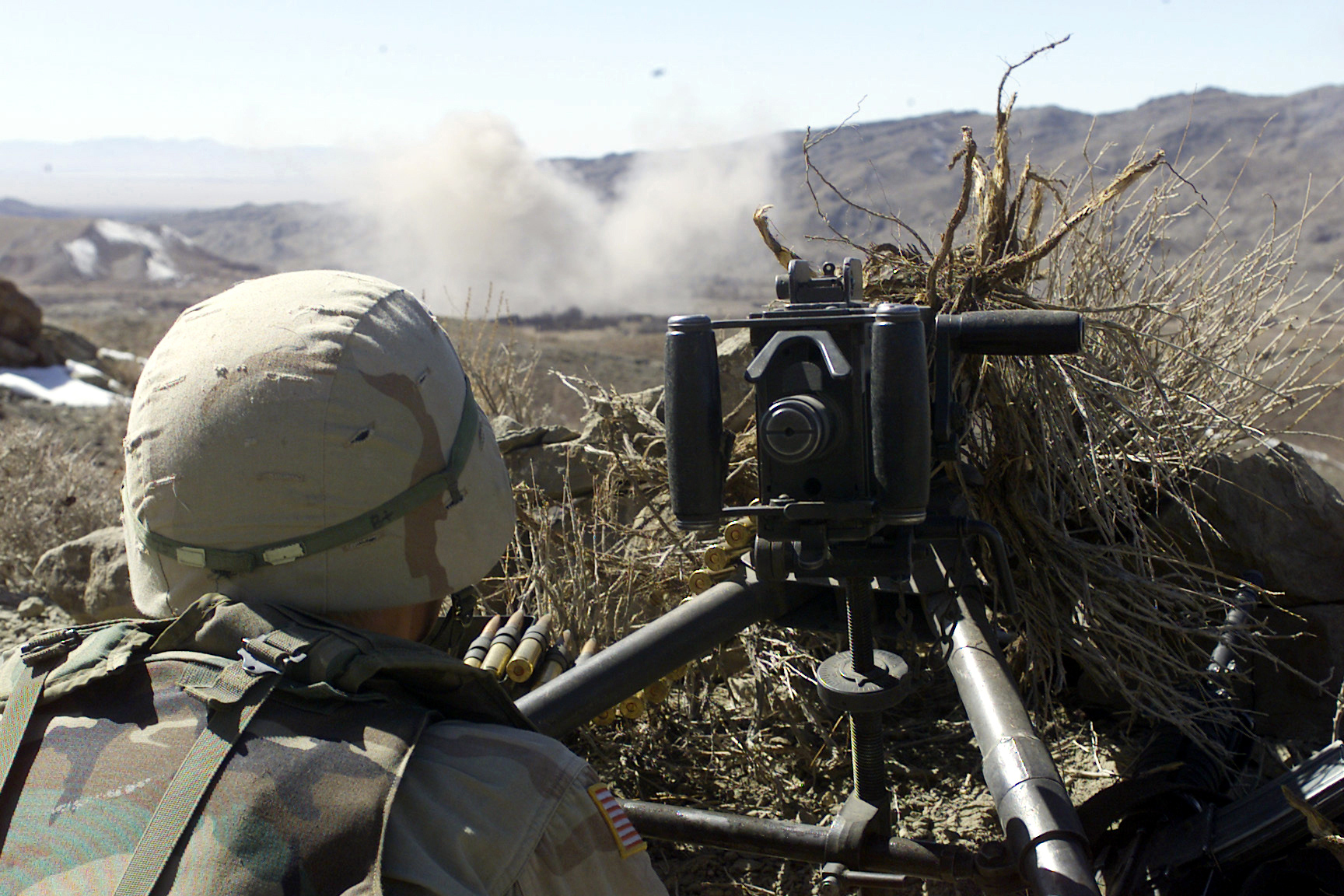
Ground view of Shah-e-kot rugged terrain

The air assault into Shah-e-Kot would be supported by five Apaches from the sister 101st Aviation Brigade. The date for the attack had initially been planned for 25 February, but bad weather forced a delay until 2 March. The helicopters would land just after the start of morning nautical twilight, as mission planners weighed the options of attacking under the cover of darkness or during daylight hours. It was finally decided to insert at sunrise to catch the enemy asleep yet provide optimal vision for the forces entering the valley.

The Apaches entered the valley first to provide overwatch of the helicopter landing zones. The attack aircraft radioed back the call of "ice", a military term for an uncontested landing. Though the aircraft were able to disembark infantry without incident, the ground force began taking small arms fire immediately after their departure. After this initial period, the infantry and supporting Chinooks would require repeated air to ground fire support from the accompanying Apaches and USAF assets. The Taliban began to target the aircraft, and on the first day of the operation, five out of seven AH-64s were put out of action by ground fire.

After the initial engagements on his forces, Colonel Frank Wiercinski (ground forces commander), decided to move his mobile command team off of the airborne command post and directly control fighting from the ground. The 159th Blackhawks would insert this element as wave two of the operation, and proceeded directly to the pre-designated HLZ. As there was only room for one Blackhawk at this landing site, the aircraft would take turns making use of the location to land, disembark the passengers, and quickly take off again. On ingress to this HLZ, the lead helicopter began to take small arms fire. Just before touch down, a RPG exploded below the lead Black Hawk and sent shrapnel into the airframe directly under the pilot's seat. The pilot continued the approach and safely deposited half the Brigade TAC before departing. The second aircraft immediately followed with the rest of the TAC.

Resupply and reinforcement efforts were further complicated by the then-standard use of VHF and FM radios for air-to-air and air-to-ground communication. Both types of radios are limited by line of sight, and as aircraft were divided by mountain ridges communication was at times interrupted.

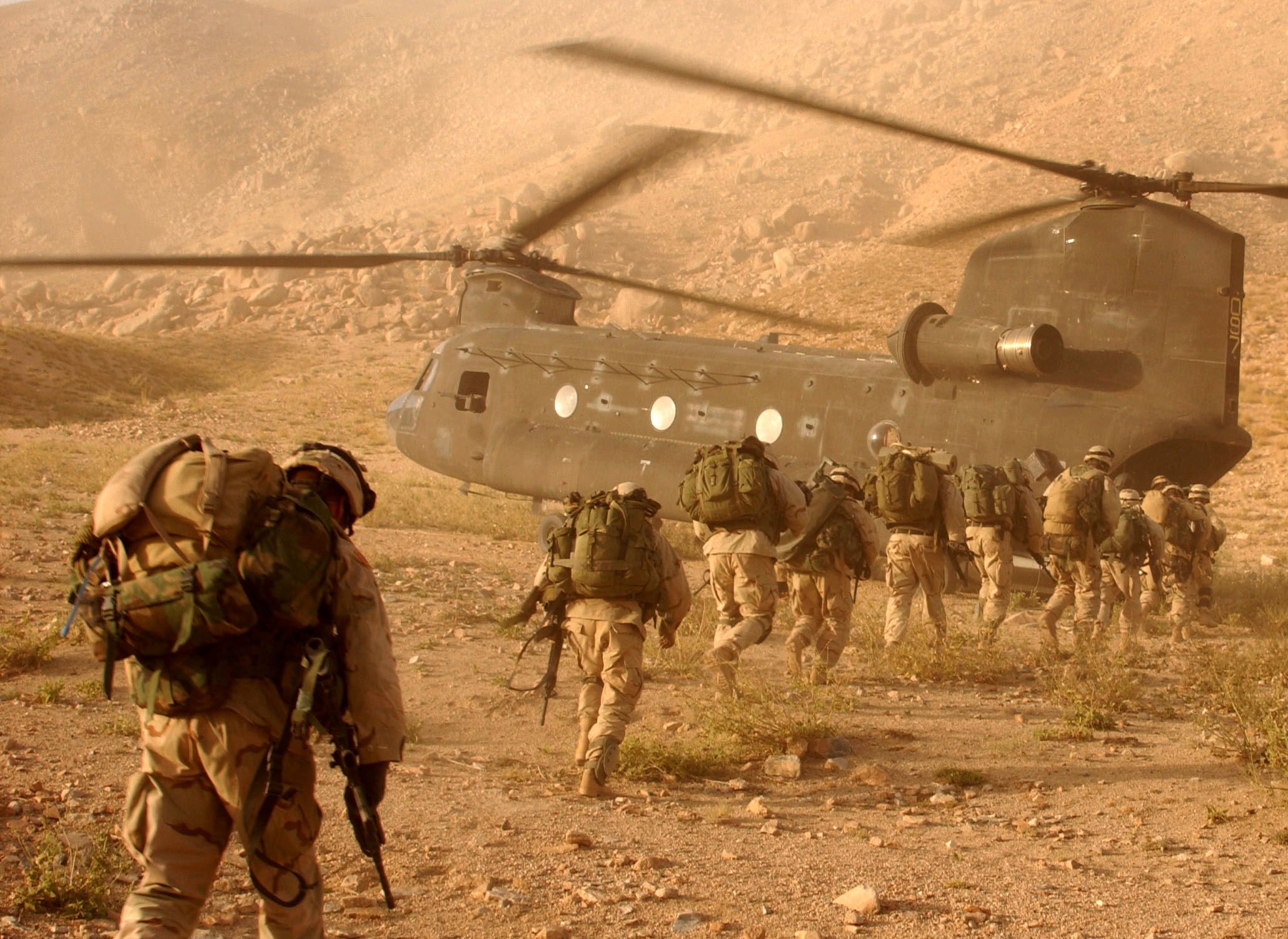
Exfiltration Operations, 159th Aviation Brigade during Operation Anaconda

A third lift of reinforcement and medical evacuation aircraft were sent to the area just before darkness on day one. During this third insertion, overhead Apache crews observed several RPG near-misses on the first aircraft, falling short, and another fired between the following two. White trails of smoke showed the path the RPGs had taken. An RPG strike to the tail rotor of one of the few remaining Apaches rendered further attack air support no longer effective. Reinforcements hovering outside the objective area could no longer be safely inserted due to intense ground fire, and supply drops for friendly positions were likely to be shot down. Given the unarmored nature of the CH-47s and UH-60s, the ground force commander ordered the supporting aircraft to return to Bagram Air Base.

During most of day two, infantry on the ground faced repeated close-range attack by enemy small arms, RPG, and mortar fire. Though only two Apaches remained serviceable to provide support, 24-hours of air force bombing began to have an effect and Taliban attacks slowly diminished. Just after sunset, Task Force Summit and the ground forces Brigade command post was extracted via CH-47.

159th Aircraft would continue to support the operation until it ended on 18 March 2002.

Images of 159th Aviation During the Battle.

=== 2003 Iraq deployment ===
In 2003, the 159th deployed in support of Operation Iraqi Freedom. On 22 April 2003 the 159th Brigade and 101st Airborne Division conducted the longest air assault in history. A mixed composition air convoy of 200 Black Hawk, Apache, Chinook and Kiowa helicopters from 159th and 101st Aviation regiments landed at two forward bases, unloading infantry soldiers and refueling. Later this same day, the Screaming Eagles made their first attack deep inside Iraq, using dozens of helicopters to hit an Iraqi armored brigade about 100 miles southwest of Baghdad, reported a CNN correspondent embedded with the 101st.

159th began combat operations in the open desert, where there was enough room for the 100-aircraft strong force to establish a tactical operations center (TOC) and tactical assembly area (TAA) Thunder I. The unit later 'jumped' to TAA Thunder II (Karbala), and Thunder III (Iskandariyah), before finally assuming operations out of Mosul Airfield.

During the initial invasion, the Brigade lost only a single aircraft due to heavy dust conditions at FARP Shell. Even at this time, the most common threat to aircraft was a mixture of small to medium-sized AAA systems, RPGs, and ground fire.

After the initial invasion, 159th assumed responsibility for Iraq's second-largest city of Mosul and four northern provinces. On 15 November 2003 Blackhawk #93-26531 (4-101st) and another Blackhawk from Bco 9th Battalion 159th CAB collided over the suburbs of Mosul approximately 5 km from the Airfield; six of the seventeen Soldiers who died that day were from 159th Aviation Brigade.

=== Army Transformation ===
Under Army Transformation, the unit was reorganized as a CAB on 17 September 2004. As part of the Army's transformation towards a modular force, the 3d Battalion, 101st Aviation Regiment transferred from the 101st CAB to 159th CAB, also part of the 101st Airborne Division. On 26 September 2005, the aviation support battalion of the 159th CAB was reflagged from the 9th Battalion (Support), 101st Aviation Regiment, to the 563d Support Battalion (Aviation).

=== 2005 Iraq deployment ===
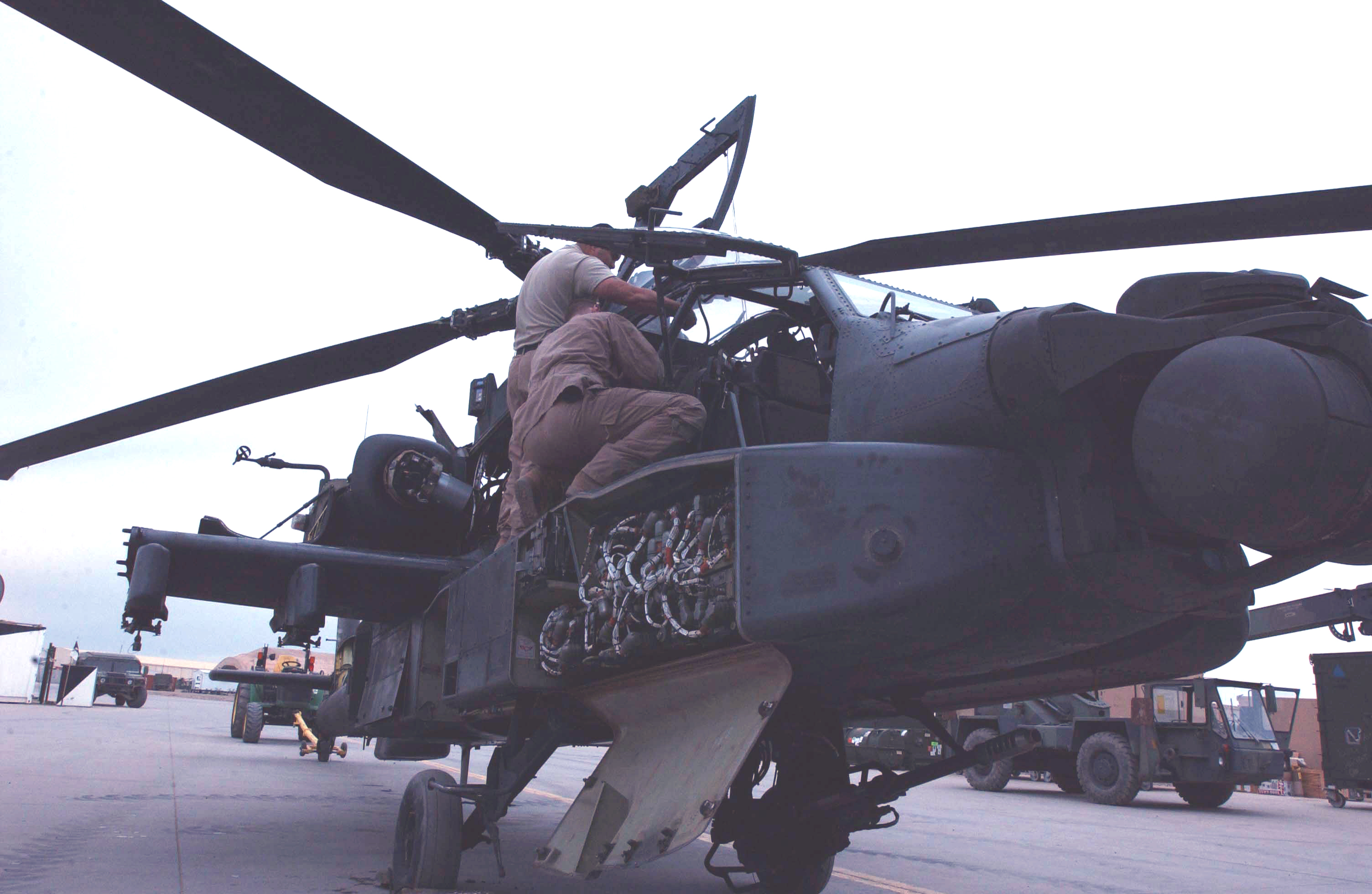
Apache maintainers during the 2005–06 Iraq deployment

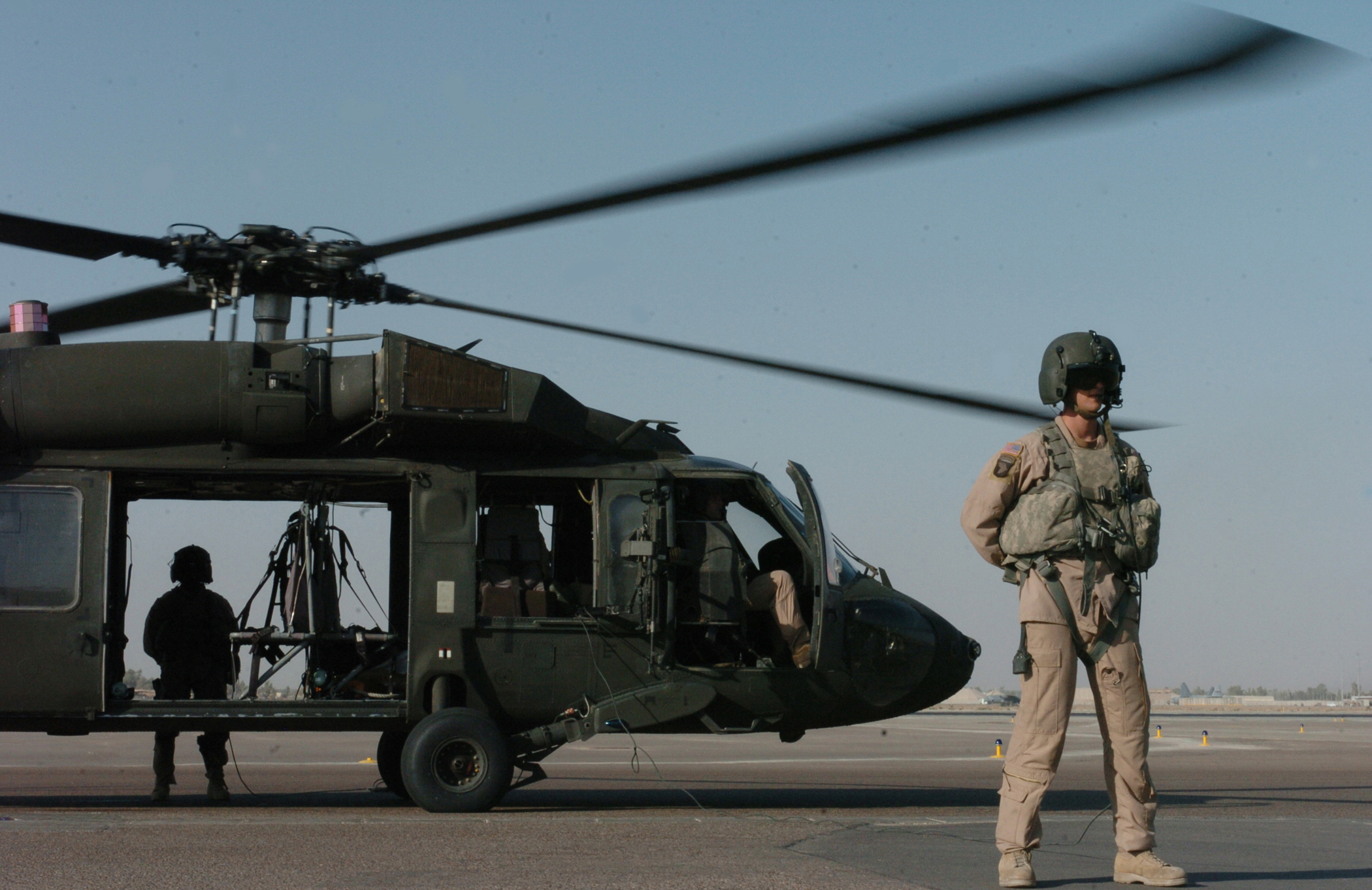
7-101 Aircrew at LSA Anaconda

Following its re-designation, the 159th CAB deployed again to Iraq in 2005. The 159th CAB worked in direct support of Multinational Corps-Iraq by providing rotary-wing helicopter support to nearly every unit in Iraq.

=== 2008 Afghanistan deployment ===
In December 2008, the 159th CAB, TF Thunder, deployed to Afghanistan in support of Operation Enduring Freedom. Headquartered out of Bagram Airbase, the brigade task force provided a wide range of aviation support to CJTF-101, CJTF-82, CJSOTF, USFOR-A and International Security and Assistance Forces (ISAF).

The 159th CAB reorganized as Task Force Thunder, and as the only U.S. Aviation Brigade operating in Afghanistan at the time assumed responsibility for an area the size of Texas. Due to the decentralized nature of the fight, the limited aviation assets in theater, and the vast geographic expanse requiring helicopter support, the Brigade established four distinct multi-functional task forces based out of Bagram, Jalalabad, Salerno, and Kandahar Airfield, with follow on establishment at FOB Shank. The joint, coalition based task force included 138 helicopters, 7 un-manned aerial systems (UAVs), and 28 various fixed wing aircraft with an oversight relationship for Polish, French and Czech Aviation units.

In 2009, the Brigade Task Force provided both direct and general support, full spectrum aviation operations, to all regional commands operating in Afghanistan. Since assuming the mission, Task Force Thunder flew over 136,000 flight hours, conducted over 509 deliberate air assaults and executed over 3,700 air movement operations. These operations resulted in moving over 132,000 Soldiers and 6,574 Tons of cargo. In addition, the unit executed more than 2,400 MEDEVAC missions, moving over 2,800 patients from point of injury to appropriate care facilities

==== FOB Blessing ====
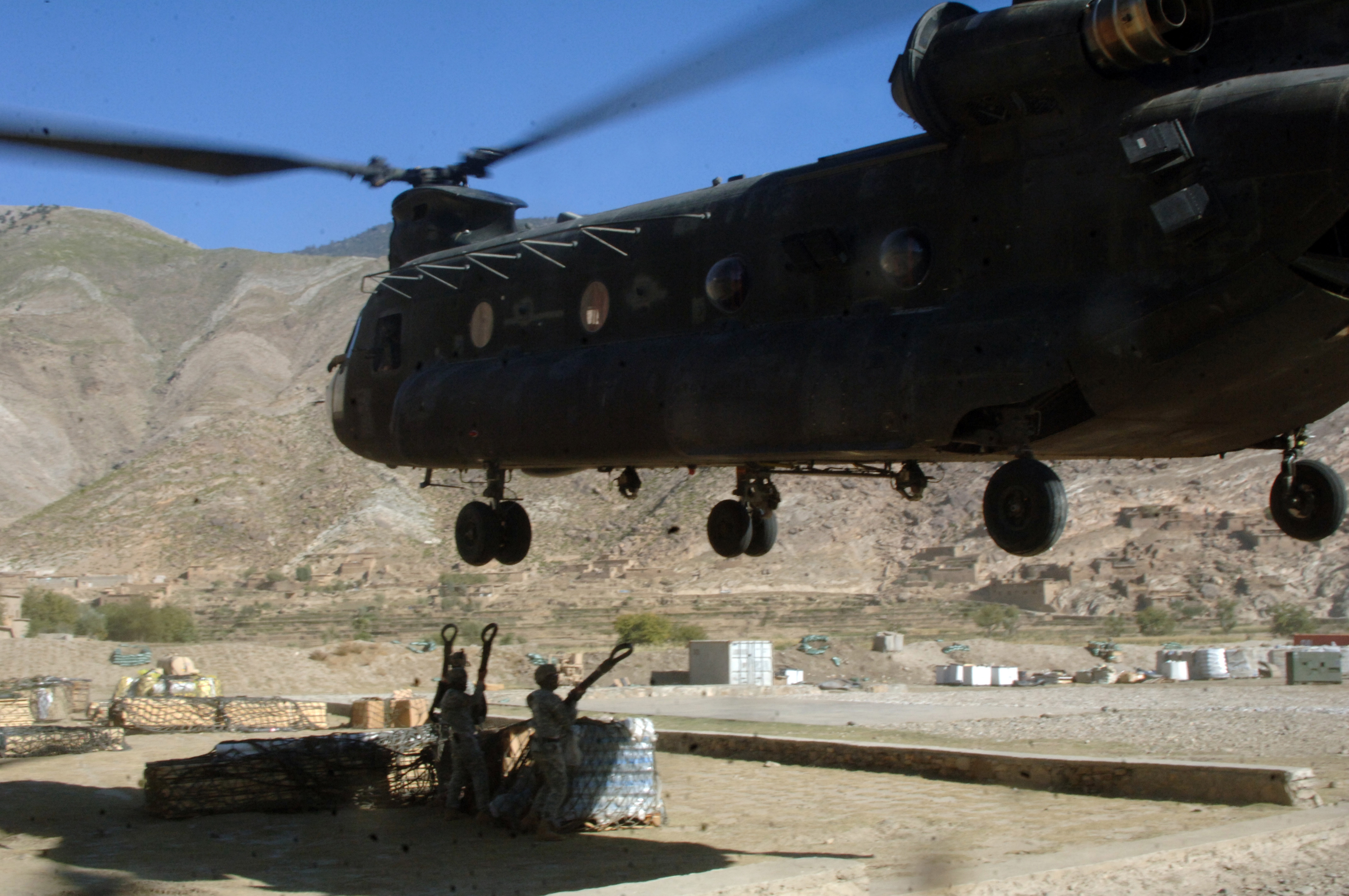
A CH-47 hovering over the HLZ at FOB Blessing

FOB Blessing and COP Vegas were located within the Korengal Valley, in Eastern Afghanistan. In September 2009, a flight of two CH-47s transferring troops and equipment from FOB Blessing to COP Vegas was ambushed by insurgents. During the second approach into COP Vegas, a CH-47 was struck in tail ramp by a rocket-propelled grenade. The aircraft hydraulics were significantly damaged, and the CH-47 pitched violently while the crew fought to regain control. The pilot made the decision to attempt to fly the severely damaged airframe back to FOB Blessing, where there would be sufficient landing space for a MEDEVAC aircraft to land and evacuate the numerous wounded on board.

Upon arrival to FOB Blessing, the pilot judged the risk of landing on the established HLZ to be too high, instead landing the aircraft in an open field to conserve the HLZ for an inbound MEDEVAC. This likely saved the lives of several of the wounded Soldiers on board, as otherwise medical crews would have been forced to spend time improvising an HLZ or even remove casualties individually from the air. After conducting an emergency shut-down, the crew found damage to the CH-47's hydraulic control lines which could have been catastrophic. The aircrew and ground forces at FOP Blessing became nervous that insurgents would launch a mortar attack on the vulnerable airframe at first light, in an attempt to set the aviation fuel inside ablaze. Fortunately, the crew was able to self-repair the damage to the hydraulics, then limped back to Bagram Airbase, an hour and a half long harrowing flight.

As a result of his heroism, 7-101 CH-47 pilot CW3 Ryan Dechent was awarded the Distinguished Flying Cross.

==== COP Keating ====
As we came over the mountain, all we could see was a big column of smoke coming from Keating. We were looking at Keating, and it was just a massive fire. Everything was burning down.

— Chief Warrant Officer 3 Ross D. Lewallen, 159th CAB Apache Pilot

159th CAB Aviators from Task Force Pale Horse (7-17 Cavalry) provided direct air support to the ground troops during the attack on COP Keating on 3 October 2009. COP Keating was located in a depression, surrounded by mountains. Because of the extremely small size of the one-hundred meter outpost, the landing zone was located 'outside the wire' - a common expression for being outside the defensive perimeter in an unsecure area. The landing zone had only enough room for one Chinook or two Blackhawks to land at one time. This would greatly complicate support and reinforcement efforts before, during, and after the Battle of Kamdesh.

Observation Post Fritsche was located on top of a nearby mountain, overlooking COP Keating and a significant liability were it overrun. The Blackhawks quickly left accompanied by two Apaches, with a load of approximately thirty infantry to fortify OP Fritsche. Upon arriving at the site, the Blackhawks began receiving heavy ground fire from what would later be assessed as a 300-strong element of enemy fighters. More troublingly, OP Fritsche could offer no support to neighboring COP Keating as the force was cut off by heavy enemy machine gun and RPG fire from within the valley. This constituted a problem for the helicopter teams since the regular avenue of approach to COP Keating was through the low-lying terrain of said valley.

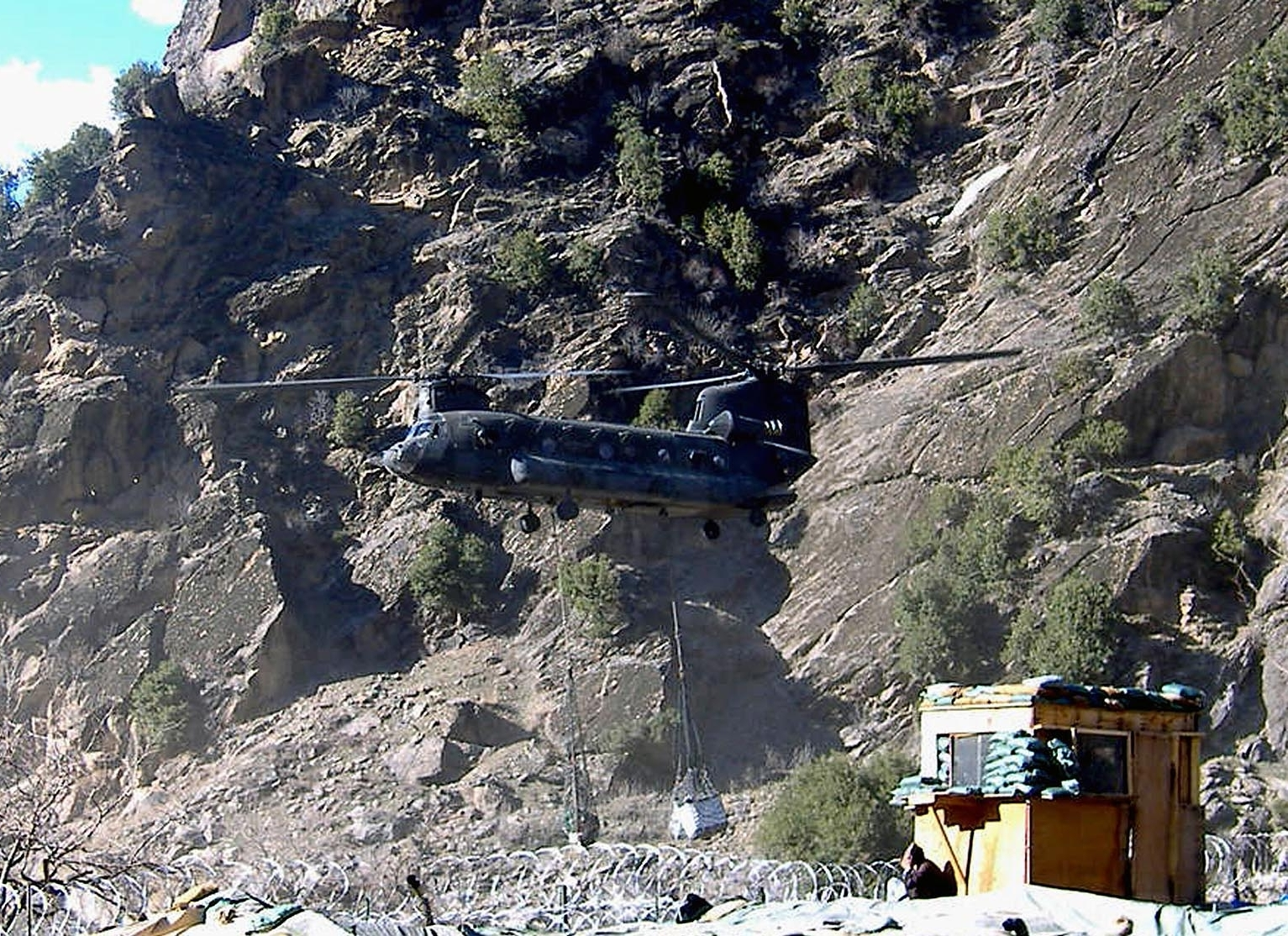
Image of COP Keating showing small size of the Helicopter Landing Zone (HLZ) and proximity to occupied buildings.

In an attempt to conceal their approach, the aircraft took a non-traditional approach by flying directly over the mountain ridge. After multiple turns in the area while under fire, the two Blackhawks were able to insert more than 100 Soldiers to reinforce the outpost. Meanwhile, the Apaches remained overhead providing support to the battered U.S. force at COP Keating. The Apache crews had been verbally told that the COP was taking heavy fire from small arms and RPGs prior to departure, however the situation was unstable and the Apache crews were worried of accidentally firing upon friendly troops. Via radio contact with the ground force within COP Keating, the crews were told to consider anyone outside the wire perimeter to be hostile. As a result, the attack aircraft engaged some thirty armed individuals just outside a large visible breach in the defensive works of COP Keating. Just after this time MEDEVAC aircraft attempted to extract wounded, but were forced to turn back due to heavy ground fire. The Apaches remained on-station for approximately 90 minutes taking repeated damage from small arms fire and eventually running out of ammunition.

As a result of small arms damage, the Apache crews were forced to switch aircraft upon returning to FOB Bostick rather than simply rearming and refueling. This had the fortunate side-effect of allowing the crews several minutes to return to the nearby unit TOC, exchange maps and information of the situation, and learn of the most recent real-time intelligence regarding events on the ground. The Apaches returned to COP Keating and began engaging a mixed group of 25 enemy fighters in and around the nearby police station and mosque. Overcast weather from an incoming thunder storm allowed the pilots to clearly see muzzle flashes from small arms and DShK heavy machine guns directed at them and friendly ground forces. The impending thunderstorm was both a blessing and a curse, as the Apaches were forced again to return to FOB Bostick due to severe weather. After approximately a one-hour weather hold, 159th CAB aircraft returned to the area one final time that day to further support ground forces with Apache fire and conduct one further reinforcement of OP Fritsche.

As a result of heroism in the face of enemy fire, 3-101 Apache pilots Captain Matthew J. Kaplan, Chief Warrant Officer 3 Ross D. Lewallen, Chief Warrant Officer 3 Randy L. Huff, Chief Warrant Officer 2 Christopher N. Wright and Chief Warrant Officer 2 Gary H. Wingert were each awarded the Distinguished Flying Cross. Additionally, 4-101's Sgt. Kevin Hobbs, a Company C. crew chief; Capt. Aaron Nichols, the assistant Task Force Wings operations officer; Chief Warrant Officer 2 Raymond Andrel, the Company C. safety officer; and Chief Warrant Officer 2 Kevin Howey, a Company C. instructor pilot were awarded the Air Medal with Valor device.

=== 2011 Afghanistan deployment ===
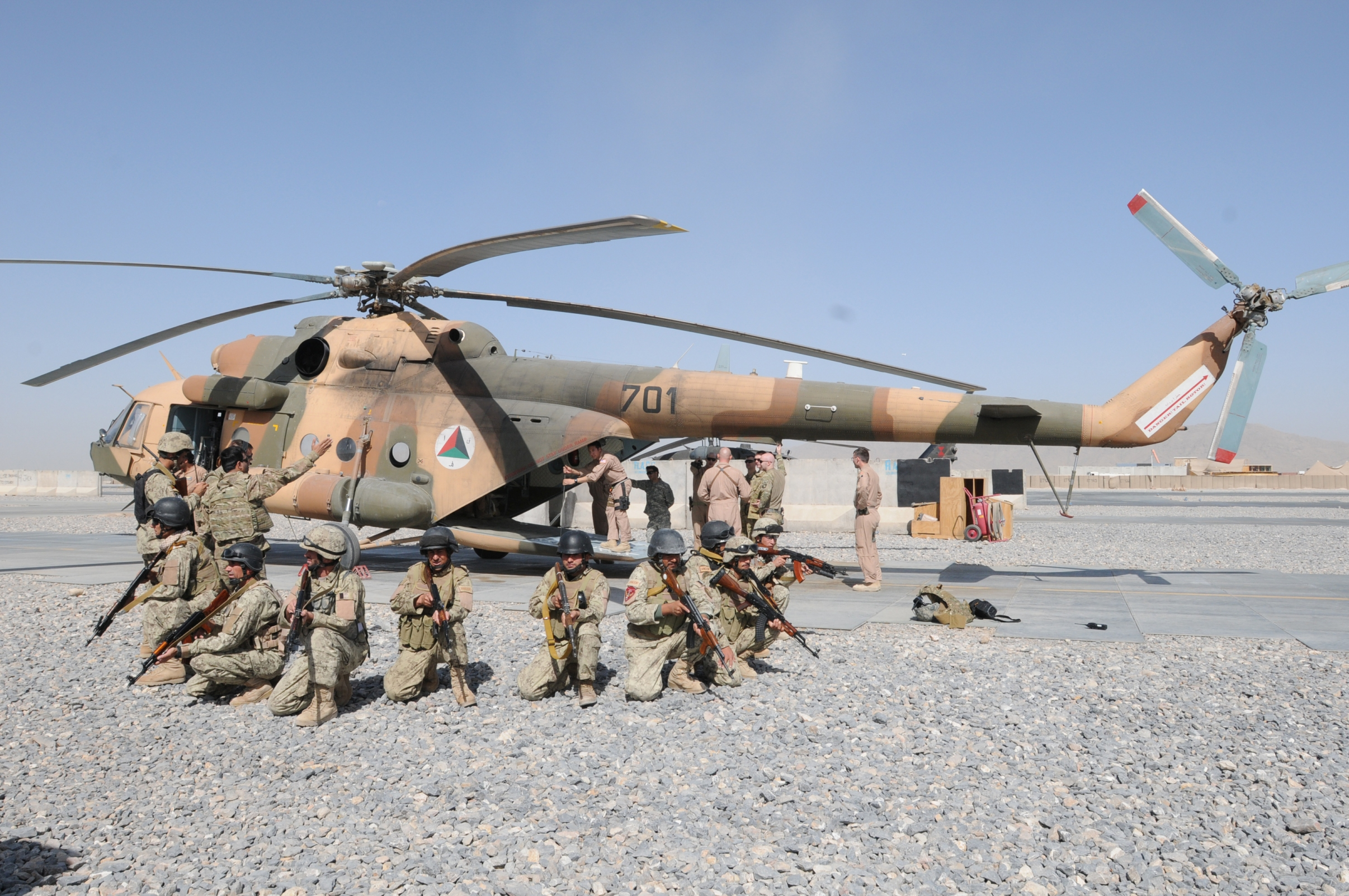
TF Thunder training together with Afghan National Army Air Force

In January 2011, the 159th CAB was again called upon to support Operation Enduring Freedom. The entire brigade, minus its MEDEVAC company that had just returned from an off-cycle deployment to Iraq and Afghanistan, assumed responsibility for the rotary wing aviation mission throughout Regional Command South in Afghanistan. Throughout its year-long deployment, the brigade provided full-spectrum aviation support to ground units, to include air assaults, air movements, reconnaissance, security, close combat attack and Pathfinder missions. During the deployment, Task Force Thunder made history when it became the first CAB to receive, integrate, and execute fixed-wing movements with Alenia C-27J Spartans and electronic attack missions with Beechcraft C-12 Caesar aircraft. The 159th CAB also took on a new role during this deployment, serving as mentors to Afghan National Security Forces. Partnerships with the Afghan Air Force, Afghan National Police, Afghan National Civil Order of Police, and the Afghan National Army helped to further improve security in the region and increase the capability of the ANSF and the government of Afghanistan.

The majority of the 101st Airborne Division redeployed from Afghanistan by late 2011. On 22 March 2012 the 159th CAB redeployed to Fort Campbell, Kentucky and, for the first time in five years, the entire 101st Airborne Division (Air Assault) was "back home" together.

==== Medevac support ====
A jug this big will blow a man's leg off and, unfortunately, I have a lot of soldiers who have lost legs to this kind of wickedness.

— Lieutenant Colonel David Flynn, 1-320th Artillery Regiment Commander in the Arghandab

...if we have to go in there 10 times, I've got to put my fears aside because they're counting on me, I'm counting on them to go out there to fight the Taliban head to head, in close quarters. When they need Medevac, we're going in there.

— Staff Sgt. Bruce Garrett, TF Thunder Medevac Aircrew

As Task Force Thunder, the 159th CAB was responsible for medical evacuation flights for all of RC-S and RC-SW in partnership with the U.S. Air Force. TF Thunder Medevac flights were based out of Kandahar Airfield, Camp Bastion, and several small combat outposts in Helmand, Uruzgun, and Zabul provinces.

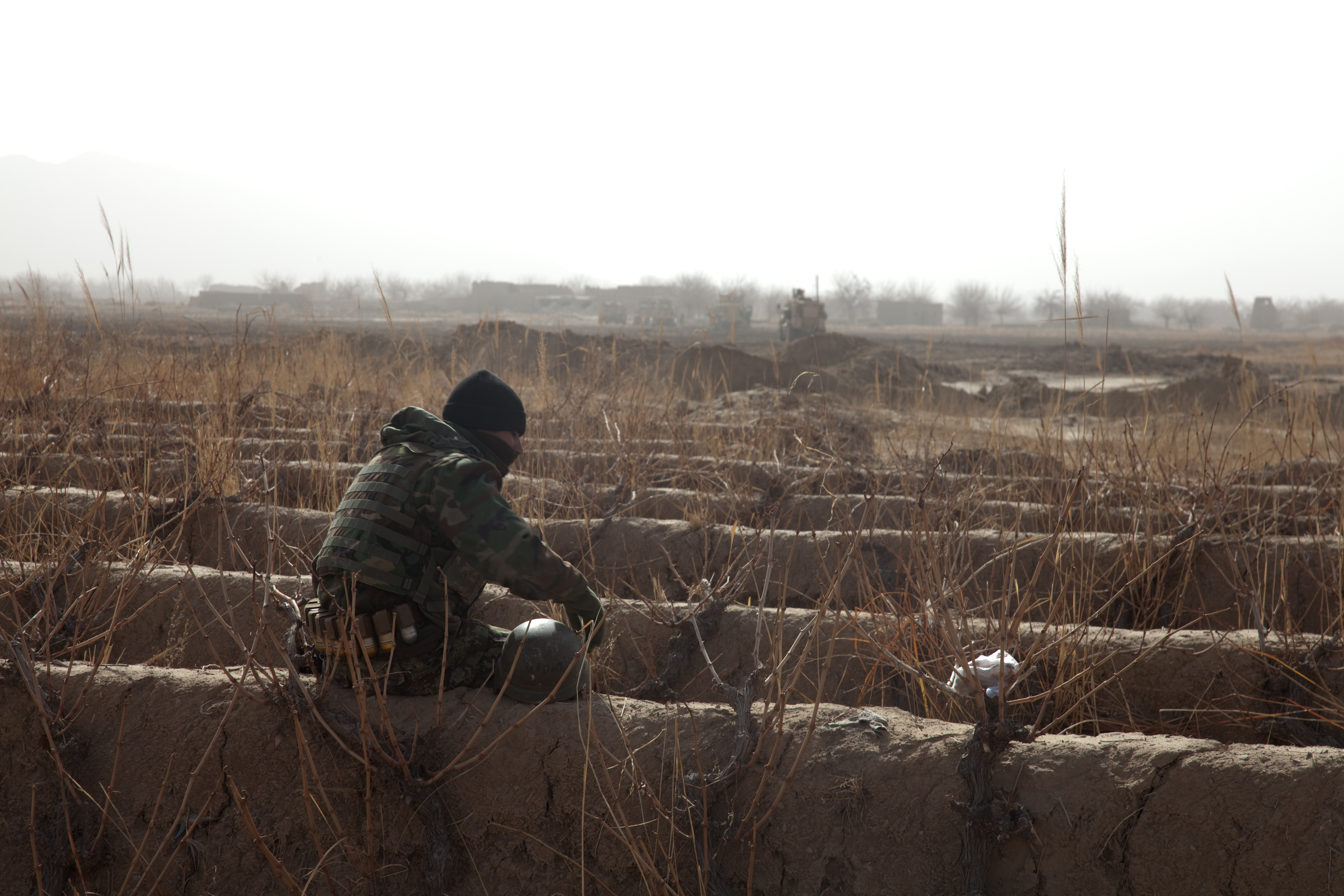
Grape Rows common in Arghandab and Helmand River Valleys

During the summer of 2011, TF Thunder partnered with Task Force Strike (2nd Brigade, 101st Airborne Division) and later Task Force Mountain (10th Mountain Division), and TF Thunder Medevac aircraft were repeatedly engaged at ranges of 100 meters or less by small arms and rocket propelled grenade fire in the claustrophobic Arghandab River and Helmand River valleys. The unique terrain in this region consisted of open wheat or poppy fields which could be used as a landing zone, and built-up grape rows which could not. The geographic situation limited Medevac pilots to a relative few landing sites, allowing for repeated ambush.

TF Thunder Medevac crews learned to cooperate closely with infantry ground forces to establish a tight security perimeter around a given HLZ. Despite this, reports of deliberate Taliban ambush of Medevac aircraft continued until the onset of cold weather that fall.

=== 2013 Afghanistan deployment ===
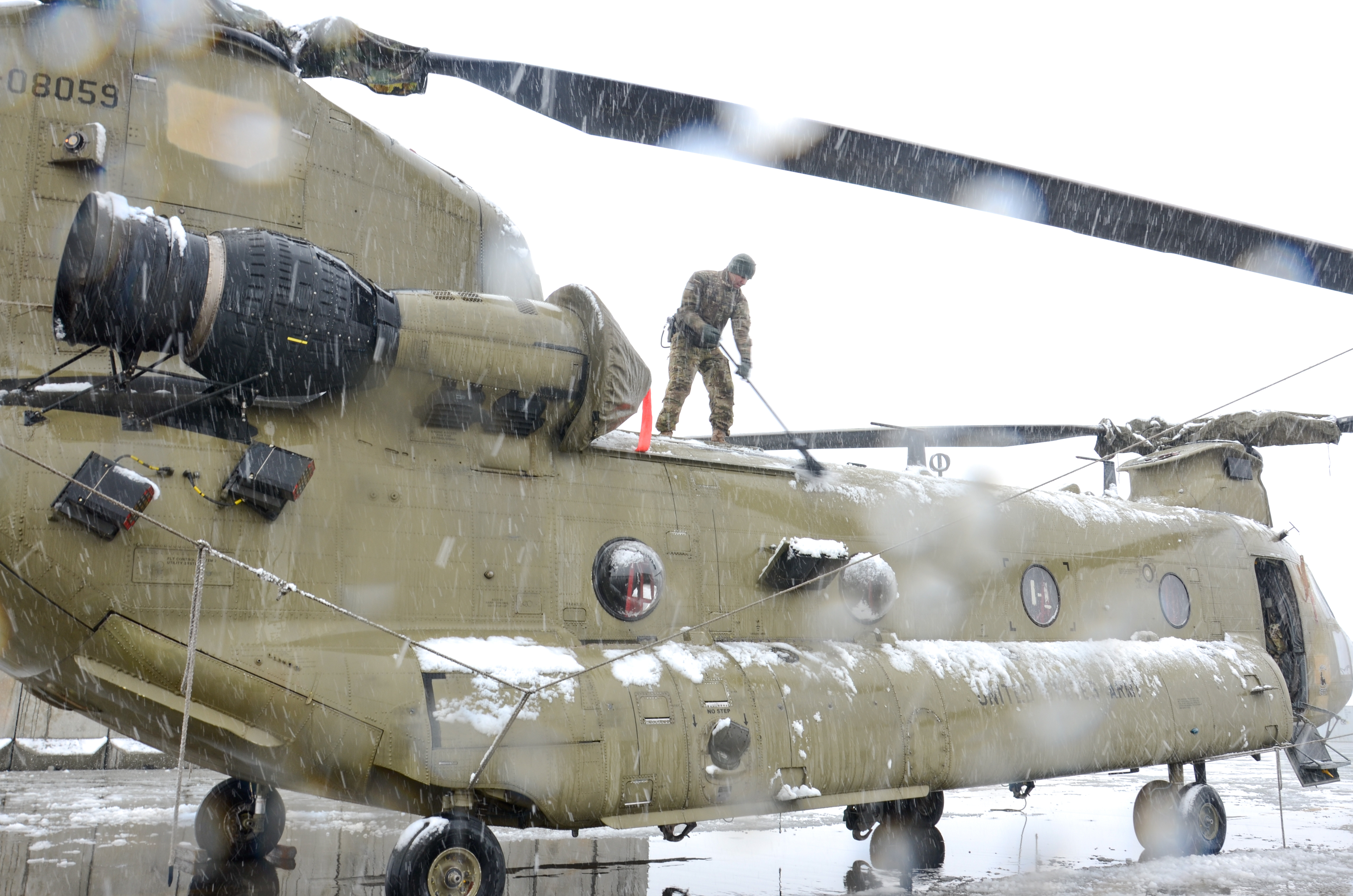
Snow at Bagram Airfield

159th CAB again deployed to RC-E Afghanistan in December 2013, spending most of 2014 there in support of Operation Enduring Freedom. The Brigade returned in September/October 2014.

== Inactivation ==
On 20 November 2014, the U.S. Army announced that the 159th CAB would be inactivated in 2015. As part of the restructuring, the Army will retain the 159th CAB's Apache battalion, the 3d Battalion (Attack/Reconnaissance), 101st Aviation Regiment, and reassign it to the 101st CAB. The majority of 159th CAB Soldiers would be sent elsewhere.
