= Combat Aviation Brigade, 101st Airborne Division =

101st Combat Aviation Brigade
- 101st Airborne Division shoulder sleeve insignia
- Active: 1968 – present
- Country: United States
- Allegiance: United States Army
- Branch: Aviation
- Type: Combat Aviation Brigade
- Size: Brigade
- Part of: 101st Airborne Division
- Garrison/HQ: Fort Campbell, Kentucky
- Nickname: Wings of Destiny
- Engagements: Vietnam, Somalia, Kuwait, Bosnia, Kosovo, Honduras, Iraq, Afghanistan

Insignia
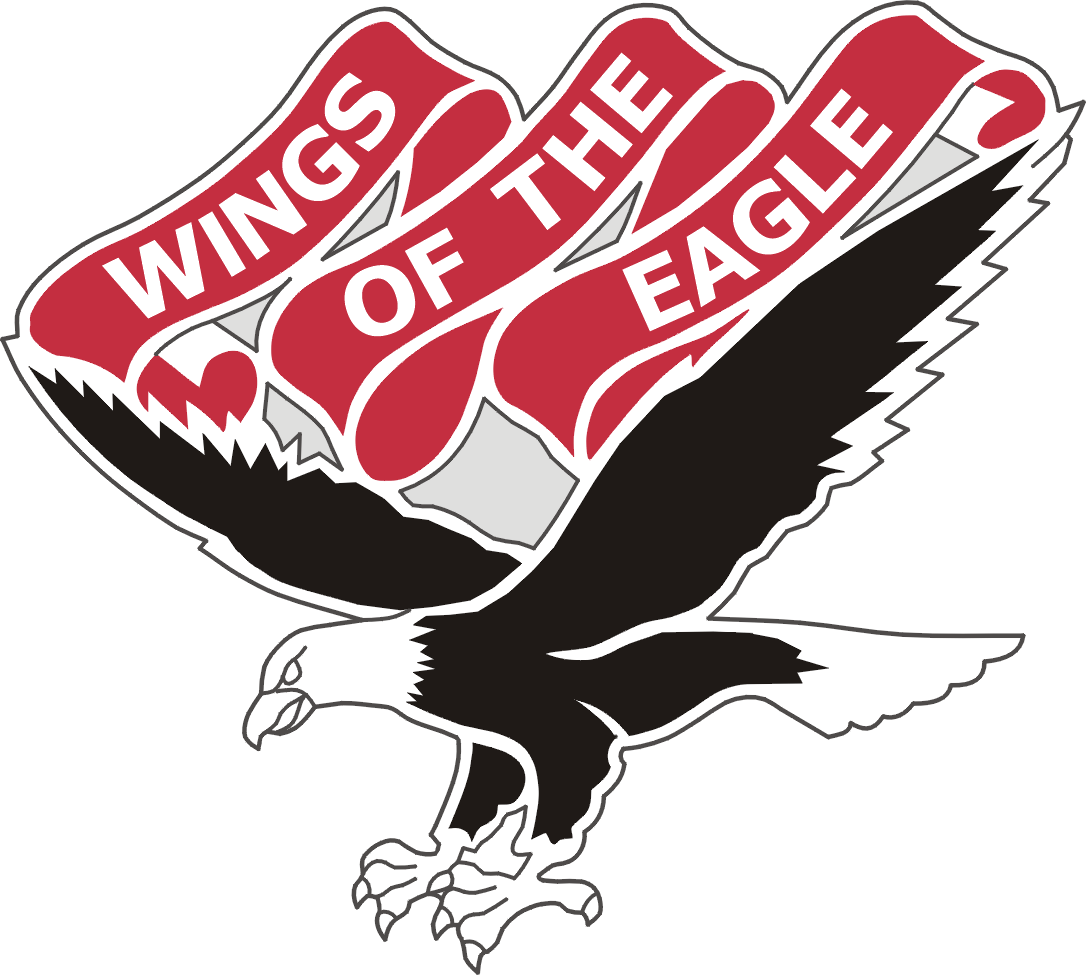
- Distinctive unit insignia of the CAB and the 101st Aviation Regiment

- Background trimming of the CAB and the 101st Aviation Regiment

Aircraft flown
- Attack helicopter: AH-64
- Cargo helicopter: CH-47
- Multirole helicopter: UH-60
- Observation helicopter: AH-64

The 101st Combat Aviation Brigade is the Combat Aviation Brigade (CAB) of the United States Army's 101st Airborne Division. It was first organized in July 1968 as an aviation group and stands as the most decorated aviation unit in the United States Army. It was redesignated an aviation brigade in 1986. It has served in almost every single military operation (combat, peacekeeping, and humanitarian) since the Vietnam War. In support of the Global War on Terror, the CAB has distinguished itself as the military's premiere combat aviation unit during its two deployments to Iraq (2003 and 2005) and five deployments to Afghanistan (2002, 2007, 2010, 2012, and 2015). The brigade has flown hundreds of thousands of hours during these combat tours, transporting millions of troops around the battlefield and providing close air support/aerial reconnaissance. The 101st broke its own record for longest air assault in history during the invasion of Iraq in 2003. Previously, the longest air assault was conducted in 1991 during Operation Desert Storm.

== Vietnam ==
On 1 July 1968, at Camp Eagle in the Republic of Vietnam, the 160th Aviation Group was constituted with elements of the 2d Squadron, 17th Cavalry; the 101st Aviation Battalion (Assault Helicopter); the 158th Aviation Battalion (Assault Helicopter); and the 159th Aviation Battalion (Assault Helicopter). Less than a year later, on 25 June 1969, the 160th Aviation Group was redesignated as the 101st Aviation Group.

== Post-Vietnam reorganization ==
On 15 August 1986, the 101st Aviation Group was redesignated as the Aviation Brigade, 101st Airborne Division. The Aviation Brigade was deployed to Saudi Arabia following Iraq's invasion of Kuwait in 1990. The 101st fired the first shots of the Persian Gulf War from AH-64 Apaches under the command of Lieutenant Colonel Richard "Dick" Cody who would later serve as the 31st Vice Chief of Staff of the United States Army. Through the 1990s, the brigade deployed elements to Somalia, Kuwait, Bosnia, Kosovo, and Honduras to defend democracy and assist in hurricane relief operations. On 9 October 1997, the Aviation Brigade (the largest aviation brigade in the Army at the time) split its nine battalions into two brigades, the 101st Aviation Brigade (Attack) and the 159th Aviation Brigade (Assault). Upon return from its Iraq deployment, the 101st Combat Aviation Brigade was finally restructured to its current form. It now consists of a battalion of AH-64D Apache Longbows (1st Battalion), a battalion/squadron of OH-58D Kiowa Warriors (2/17th Cavalry), an assault battalion of UH-60M Black Hawks (5th Battalion), a general support battalion of CH-47F Chinooks, UH-60A Black Hawks, and UH-60L Black Hawks (6th Battalion), and an aviation support battalion (96th ASB). The 159th Aviation Brigade (Assault) underwent a similar transformation and was redesignated as the 159th Combat Aviation Brigade. The 101st Airborne Division (Air Assault) was the only division in the US Army to have two aviation brigades.

On 7 May 2015 the 159th Combat Aviation Brigade was inactivated at a ceremony at the Fort Campbell, Kentucky, Division Parade field, leaving only the 101st Combat Aviation Brigade in the division. Concurrently the 101st CAB was redesignated as the Combat Aviation Brigade, 101st Airborne Division, bringing it in line with other divisional aviation brigades, which are not numbered. This reorganization resulted in the division having the same configuration as the 10th Mountain Division, a light infantry division.

Along with the 159th Combat Aviation Brigade being inactivated, one of the most storied dustoff units in the United States Army history was inactivated as well, the division's "Eagle Dustoff." During the 1990 Gulf War (Desert Shield/Desert Storm) Eagle Dustoff was deployed to the Saudi Arabian Theater of operations on 22 August 1990 and was the first US Army medevac unit in country. When Eagle Dustoff landed in Dhahran Saudi Arabia and was unloaded from a C-5A Galaxy, the unit immediately began taking missions with the evacuation of a US Marine with a broken leg. Throughout Desert Shield and Desert Storm, Eagle Dustoff transported and saved the lives of US military personnel, Saudi nationals and Iraqi enemy prisoners of war.

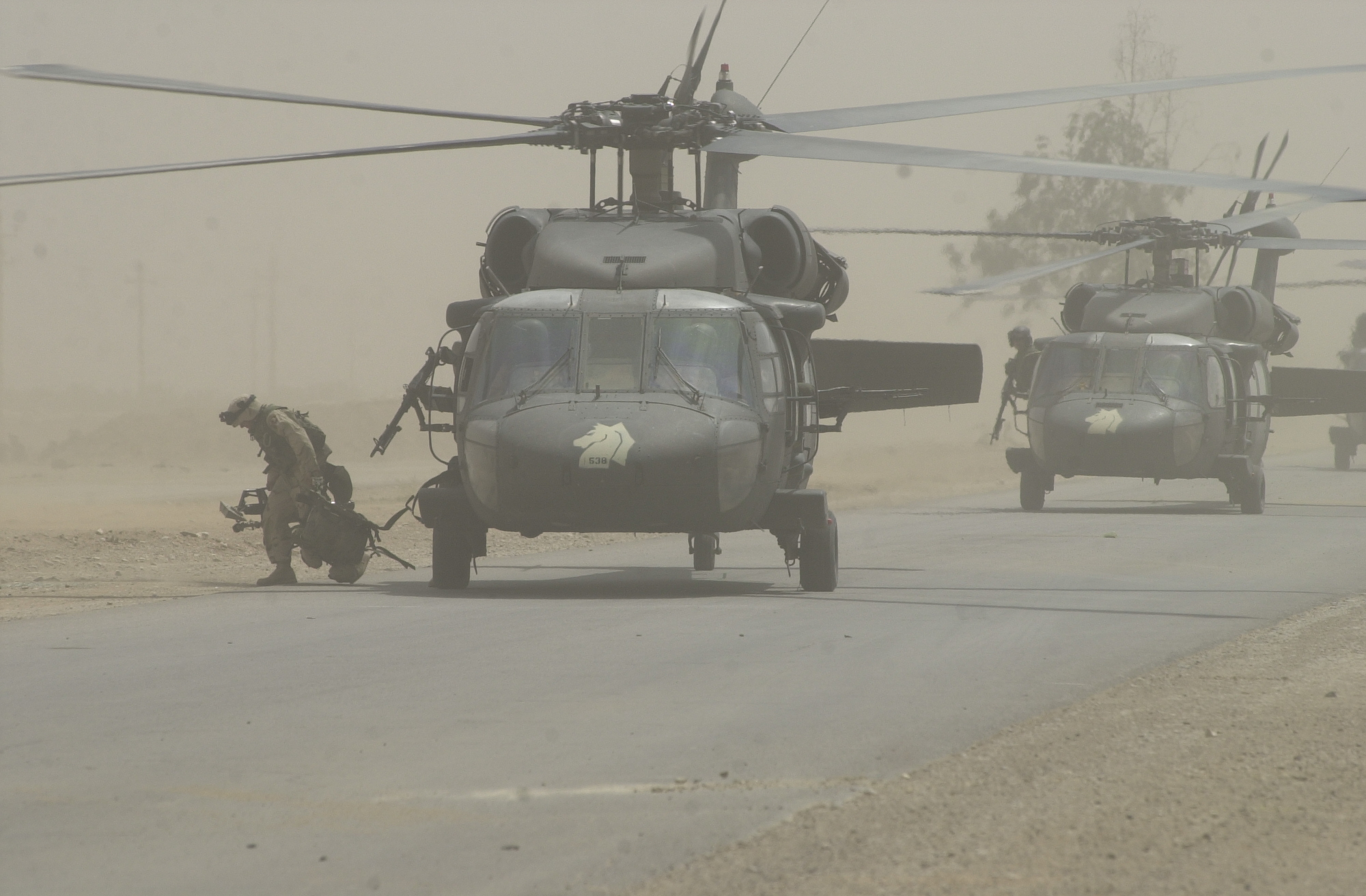
UH-60L from B Company ("Lancers"), 5th Battalion, on an air assault mission in Iraq

== Operations Iraqi and Enduring Freedom ==
Beginning in January 2002, the brigade responded to the call to arms in support of Operation Enduring Freedom in Afghanistan following the attacks on 9/11. The 101st was the first conventional aviation asset deployed after 9/11. The 101st would support battalions of the 187th Infantry Regiment (part of the 3d Brigade of the 101st Airborne Division), fighting Taliban and Al-Qaeda forces.

In February 2003, the brigade was again alerted to deploy in support of Operation Iraqi Freedom. The brigade crossed the berm into Iraq on 21 March 2003, to launch deep attacks, as well as guard the V Corps' western flank. The brigade facilitated the liberation of three major cities and the coalition forces' march on Baghdad.

After the brigade's redeployment in the spring of 2004, it transformed into an effort to create a self-sustaining combat aviation brigade. Completely transformed, the brigade once again answered the nation's call in August 2005 and began its second deployment in support of Operation Iraqi Freedom. Headquartered out of COB Speicher in Tikrit, the brigade provided full-spectrum aviation support to the 101st Airborne Division (Air Assault) and its five brigade combat teams that were arrayed across 131,000 square kilometers of the Band of Brothers' area of operation. During this deployment, the 101st innovated a unique strategy dubbed Eagle Watch, using its aircraft to conduct effective vehicle interdictions using its UH-60 Black Hawk helicopters and Pathfinders.

In December 2007, the 101st Combat Aviation Brigade, Task Force Destiny, deployed to Afghanistan in support of Operation Enduring Freedom. Headquartered out of Bagram Airfield, the brigade task force provided full-spectrum aviation support to CJTF-82, CJTF-101, CJSOTF and International Security Assistance Force, covering an area of responsibility the size of Texas.

Deploying to Afghanistan again, this time to Kandahar Airfield in February 2010 after having their dwell period cut short by four months, Task Force Destiny's arrival coincided with the anticipated introduction of the "surge" of forces announced by the commander in chief three months earlier. Task Force Shadow, stationed out of Kandahar along with Brigade HQ, provided support to all of RC South but most notably the 502nd Infantry Regiment as they secured the Arghandab River Valley. The Arghandab River Valley was the site of some of the toughest and bloodiest fighting since the war began in Afghanistan. Over the course of the combat deployment, TF Shadow (A co. 6-101, B co. 6-101, B co. 5-101, C co. 6-101, A & C trp. 2-17) conducted multiple combat operations, including reconnaissance, support of troops in contact, air assaults, combat resupply operations, support of Special Operations Forces, MEDEVAC, and many training flights in expanding current aviation capacity. Task Force Destiny Soldiers assisted the Shadow aviation units by conducted refueling at operating bases across the country 24 hours a day to ensure all supported ground forces retained flexibility in their operations.

== Current role and structure ==
Since the brigade's restructuring in 2004, the Combat Aviation Brigade (CAB), 101st Airborne Division has become a self-sufficient aviation unit. It has successfully utilized the Task Force format in its 2008, 2010, and 2012, 2014 deployments to Afghanistan. In keeping with the traditions by the 101st Airborne Division of using card suits to distinguish subordinate units, the brigade is represented by the diamond (♦) on their helmets.In September 2024, the Department of the Army announced that the brigade would deploy from Fort Campbell, Kentucky, to the United States Central Command area of responsibility, replacing the 10th Mountain Division Combat Aviation Brigade.

The Combat Aviation Brigade, 101st Airborne Division currently consists of the following units:

- Combat Aviation Brigade
  - Headquarters and Headquarters Company (HHC), CAB (Hell Cats)
  - 1st Battalion, 101st Aviation Regiment (Expect No Mercy)
    - HHC (Avengers)
    - A Company (Spectres)
    - B Company (Bearcats)
    - C Company (Paladins)
    - D Company (Dragonslayers)
    - E Company (Executioners)
    - B/101 Aviation Regiment (Archangels)
  - 5th Battalion, 101st Aviation Regiment (Eagle Assault)
    - HHC (Havoc)
    - A Company (Phoenix)
    - B Company (Lancers)
    - C Company (Phantoms)
    - D Company (Ghostriders)
    - E Company (Renegades)
  - 6th Battalion, 101st Aviation Regiment (Shadow of the Eagle)
    - HHC (Iron Eagles)
    - A Company (Warlords)
    - B Company (Pachyderms)
    - C Company (Eagle Dustoff)
    - D Company (Witchdoctors)
    - E Company (Trailblazers)
    - F Company (Sky Masters)
    - G Company (Varsity)
  - 7th Battalion, 101st Aviation Regiment (Eagle Lift)
  - 96th Aviation Support Battalion (Troubleshooters)
    - Headquarters and Support Company (Wolfpack)
    - A Company (Roadrunners)
    - B Company (Big Ugly)
    - C Company (CIPHER)
