= VHF radio =

VHF radio can refer to several communications services in the very high frequency (VHF) range, including:

- Airband aircraft radio
- Amateur radio in the 6-, 2- and 1-1/4-meter bands
- FM radio broadcasts
- Marine VHF radio
