= 101st Aviation Regiment =

Aviation Regiment of the US Army 101st Airborne Division

- Coat of arms
- Active: 1950
- Country: United States of America
- Branch: United States Army Aviation Branch
- Type: Aviation
- Motto: WINGS OF THE EAGLE
- Colors: Ultramarine Blue, Golden orange

Insignia
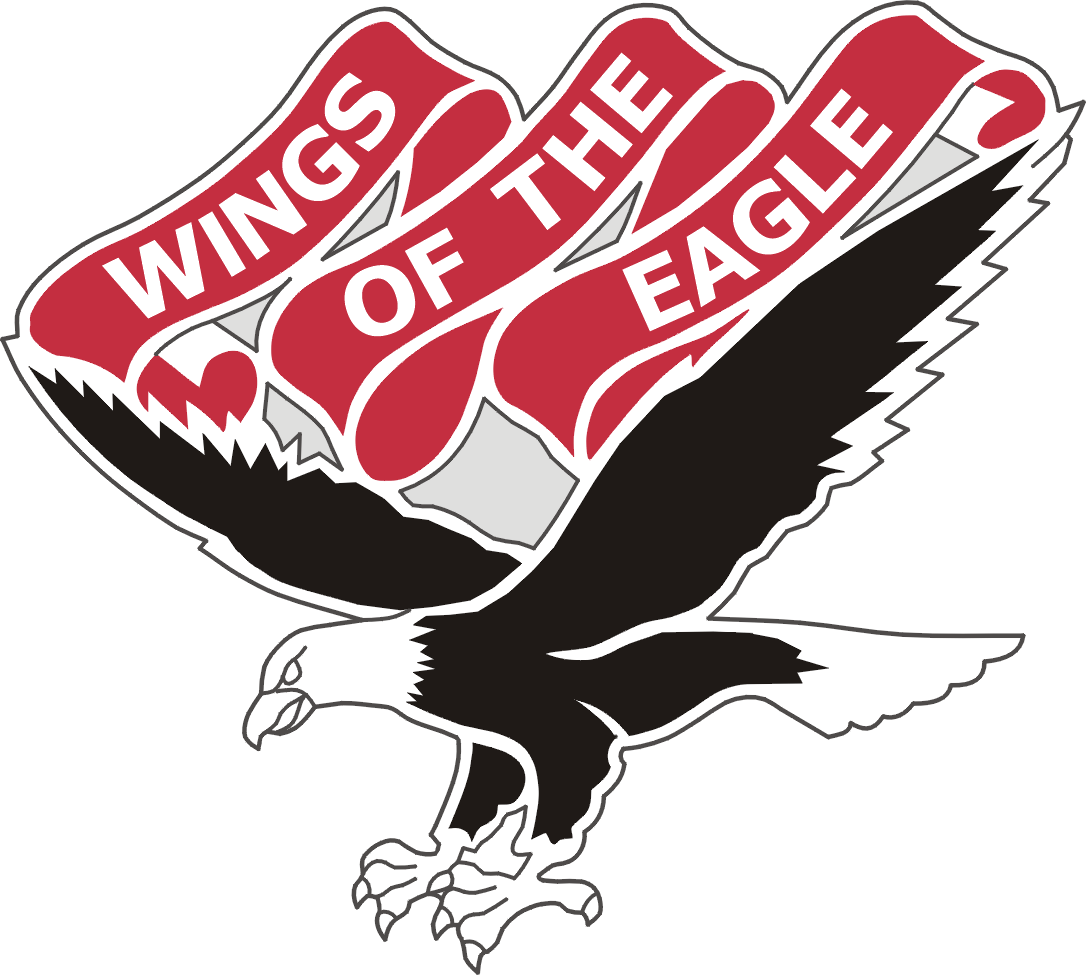
- Distinctive unit insignia

- Background trimming

Aircraft flown
- Attack helicopter: AH-64
- Cargo helicopter: CH-47
- Multirole helicopter: UH-60

The 101st Aviation Regiment is an aviation regiment of the U.S. Army.

== Lineage ==
Constituted 7 December 1950 in the Regular Army as the 4th Light Aviation Section

Activated 19 December 1950 in Korea

Inactivated 5 November 1954 in Korea

Redesignated 1 July 1956 as the 101st Aviation Company, assigned to the 101st Airborne Division, and activated at Fort Campbell, Kentucky

Reorganized and redesignated 3 December 1962 as Headquarters and Headquarters Company, 101st Aviation Battalion (organic elements constituted 15 November 1962 and activated 3 December 1962 at Fort Campbell, Kentucky)

Reorganized and redesignated 16 October 1987 as the 101st Aviation, a parent regiment under the United States Army Regimental System

== Distinctive unit insignia ==
=== Description ===
A silver color metal and black enamel eagle 1 1/8 inches (2.9 cm) in height overall, with wings elevated, between the wings a three-segmented red scroll inscribed "WINGS" at the top, "OF THE" in the middle and "EAGLE" on the lower scroll in silver letters.

=== Symbolism ===
The eagle in flight represents Aviation. It also alludes to the 101st Airborne Division, to which the organization is assigned.

=== Background ===
The distinctive unit insignia was originally approved for the 101st Aviation Battalion on 22 April 1965. It was redesignated for the 101st Aviation Regiment, effective 16 October 1987, and amended to update the description and symbolism.

== Coat of arms ==
=== Blazon ===
- Shield

Azure, a pile lozengy at the point Argent, in chief a mullet of eight rays per fess wavy Gules and of the first.

- Crest

On a wreath of the colors, Argent and Azure, between two triangles Sable a horse's head Argent. Motto WINGS OF THE EAGLE.

- Symbolism
- Shield

Teal blue and white are the colors formerly used by Aviation units. Participation by the parent unit (4th Aviation Section) in the actions at Whitehorse Mountain, Triangle Hill and Sniper Ridge in Korea is denoted by the three corners of the wedge shape in the center. The projection at its base represents the Kumsong Salient action. The aviation section is credited with eight campaigns in Korea, and these are cited by the estoile (with eight rays) in the colors of the Korean taeguk, further symbolizing award of the Korean Presidential Unit Citation.

- Crest

The crest is symbolic of the action at Whitehorse Mountain, Triangle Hill and Sniper Ridge.

- Background

The coat of arms was originally approved for the 101st Aviation Battalion on 2 March 1965. It was redesignated for the 101st Aviation Regiment, effective 16 October 1987, and amended to update the blazon and symbolism.

== Subordinate unit lineage ==
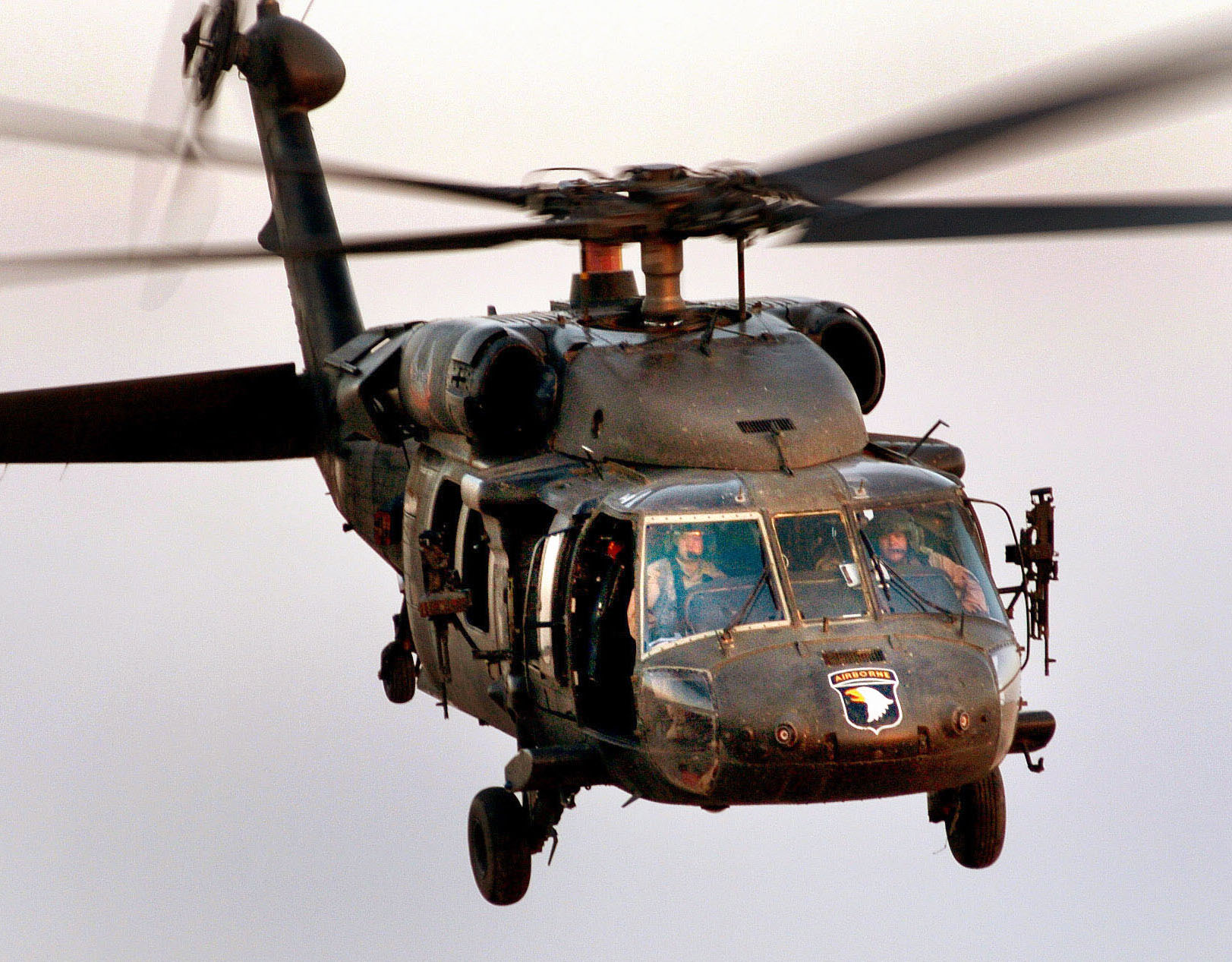
UH-60 Black Hawk helicopter from 5th Battalion, 101st Aviation Regiment

=== 1st Battalion, 101st Aviation Regiment ===
- Headquarters and Headquarters Company (HHC)
  - Constituted 15 November 1962 in the Regular Army as Company A, 101st Aviation Battalion, an element of the 101st Airborne Division
  - Activated 3 December 1962 at Fort Campbell, Kentucky
  - Inactivated 4 April 1979 at Fort Campbell, Kentucky
  - Activated 30 September 1981 at Fort Campbell, Kentucky
  - Reorganized and redesignated 16 October 1987 as Headquarters and Headquarters Company, 1st Battalion, 101st Aviation Regiment, and remained assigned to the 101st Airborne Division. Organic elements concurrently constituted and activated.
- Company A "Spectres"
  - Iraq 2003 – 2004
- Company B "Bearcats"
  - Iraq 2003 – 2004
- Company C "Paladins"
  - Iraq 2003 – 2004
- Company D "Dragon Slayers"
  - Iraq 2003 – 2004

=== 2nd Battalion, 101st Aviation Regiment ===
- HHC
  - Constituted 15 November 1962 in the Regular Army as Company B, 101st Aviation Battalion, an element of the 101st Airborne Division
  - Activated 3 December 1962 at Fort Campbell, Kentucky.
  - Reorganized and redesignated 16 October 1987 as Headquarters and Headquarters Company, 2nd Battalion, 101st Aviation Regiment, and remained assigned to the 101st Airborne Division
  - Inactivated 16 November 1988 at Fort Campbell, Kentucky
  - Activated 16 August 1991 at Fort Campbell, Kentucky
- Company A "Renegades" (AH-64D)
  - Iraq 2003–2004
- Company B "Reapers" (AH-64D)
  - Iraq 2003–2004
- Company C

=== 3rd Battalion, 101st Aviation Regiment ===
- HHC
  - 1 July 1968 in the Regular Army as Company C, 101st Aviation Battalion, an element of the 101st Airborne Division
  - Activated 20 December 1968 in Vietnam.
  - Reorganized and redesignated 16 October 1987 as Headquarters and Headquarters Company, 3rd Battalion, 101st Aviation Regiment, and remained assigned to the 101st Airborne Division.
- Company A "Killer Spades" (AH-64D)
  - Afghanistan 2002 – HQ at Kandahar Airfield.
- Company B "Blue Max"
  - Afghanistan Jan 2009 – Jul 2009
- Company C "Widowmakers"
  - Iraq Sep 2005 – Sep 2006
  - Afghanistan Dec 2008 – Dec 2009
  - Afghanistan Jan 2011 – Jan 2012

=== 4th Battalion, 101st Aviation Regiment ===
- HHC
  - Constituted 1 July 1968 in the Regular Army as Company D, 101st Aviation Battalion, an element of the 101st Airborne Division
  - Activated 20 December 1968 in Vietnam
  - Inactivated 30 September 1981 at Fort Campbell, Kentucky
  - Redesignated 16 October 1987 as Headquarters and Headquarters Company, 4th Battalion, 101st Aviation Regiment, and activated at Fort Campbell, Kentucky, as an element of the 101st Airborne Division
- Company B
  - Afghanistan Dec 2008 – Nov 2009
- Company C
  - Afghanistan Jan 2009 – Jul 2009
  - Afghanistan Feb 2011 – Feb 2012
- Company F
  - Afghanistan Dec 2008 – Dec 2009

=== 5th Battalion, 101st Aviation Regiment ===
- HHC
  - Constituted 16 September 1987 in the Regular Army as the 5th Battalion, 101st Aviation Regiment, assigned to the 101st Airborne Division, and activated at Fort Campbell, Kentucky

=== 6th Battalion, 101st Aviation Regiment ===
- HHC
  - Constituted 16 September 1987 in the Regular Army as the 6th Battalion, 101st Aviation Regiment, assigned to the 101st Airborne Division, and activated at Fort Campbell, Kentucky
  - Battalion was formed using the assets of the 123rd Aviation Battalion. The 123rd had been reactivated on 17 December 1985 from aviation assets within the 101st Division's command groups and the 163rd Aviation Company.

=== 7th Battalion, 101st Aviation Regiment ===
- HHC
  - Constituted 7 December 1950 in the Regular Army as the 4th Light Aviation Section.
  - Activated 19 December 1950 in Korea
  - Inactivated 5 November 1954 in Korea
  - Redesignated 1 July 1956 as the 101st Aviation Company, assigned to the 101st Airborne Division, and activated at Fort Campbell, Kentucky
  - Reorganized and redesignated 3 December 1962 as Headquarters and Headquarters Company, 101st Aviation Battalion
  - Headquarters Company, 101st Aviation Battalion reorganized and redesignated 16 October 1987 as Headquarters and Headquarters Company, 7th Battalion, 101st Aviation Regiment, and remained assigned to the 101st Airborne Division

=== 8th Battalion, 101st Aviation Regiment ===
- HHC
  - Constituted 16 October 1987 in the Regular Army as the 8th Battalion, 101st Aviation Regiment, assigned to the 101st Airborne Division, and activated at Fort Campbell, Kentucky

=== 9th Battalion (Support), 101st Aviation Regiment ===
- HHC
  - Constituted 16 December 1989 in the Regular Army as the 9th Battalion, 101st Aviation Regiment, assigned to the 101st Airborne Division, and activated at Fort Campbell, Kentucky
  - In 2004, the 9th Battalion (Support) was redesigned as the 563rd Aviation Support Battalion and was deployed in 2005 to Iraq.

== See also ==
- List of United States Army aircraft battalions
- U.S. Army Regimental System
