= 98th =

98th is the ordinal form of the number 98. 98th or Ninety-eighth may also refer to:

- A fraction, 1/98, equal to one of 98 equal parts

== Geography ==
- 98th meridian east, a line of longitude
- 98th meridian west, a line of longitude
- 98th Street (Manhattan)

== Military ==
- 98th Brigade (disambiguation)
- 98th Division (disambiguation)
- 98th Regiment (disambiguation)
- 98th Squadron (disambiguation)

== Other ==
- 98th century
- 98th century BC

== See also ==
- April 8, 98th day of the year in a standard year
- 98 (disambiguation)
