= Multi-National Corps – Iraq =

Multi-National Corps - Iraq
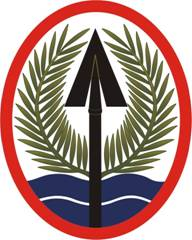
- The Shoulder Sleeve Insignia (SSI) of Multi-National Corps – Iraq (MNC-I).
- Active: May 14, 2004 - December 31, 2009
- Country: United States; United Kingdom; Australia
- Size: 100,000
- Part of: Multi-National Force-Iraq
- Corps Headquarters: Al-Faw Palace, Camp Victory, Baghdad, Iraq
- Engagements: Iraq War

Commanders
- Notable commanders: U.S. Army General Charles H. Jacoby Jr.; U.S. Army General Peter W. Chiarelli; U.S. Army General Lloyd J. Austin III; U.S. Army General Raymond T. Odierno

Insignia
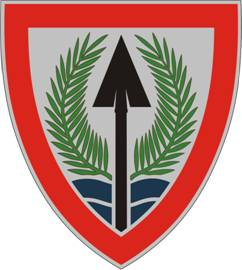
- Distinctive Unit Insignia

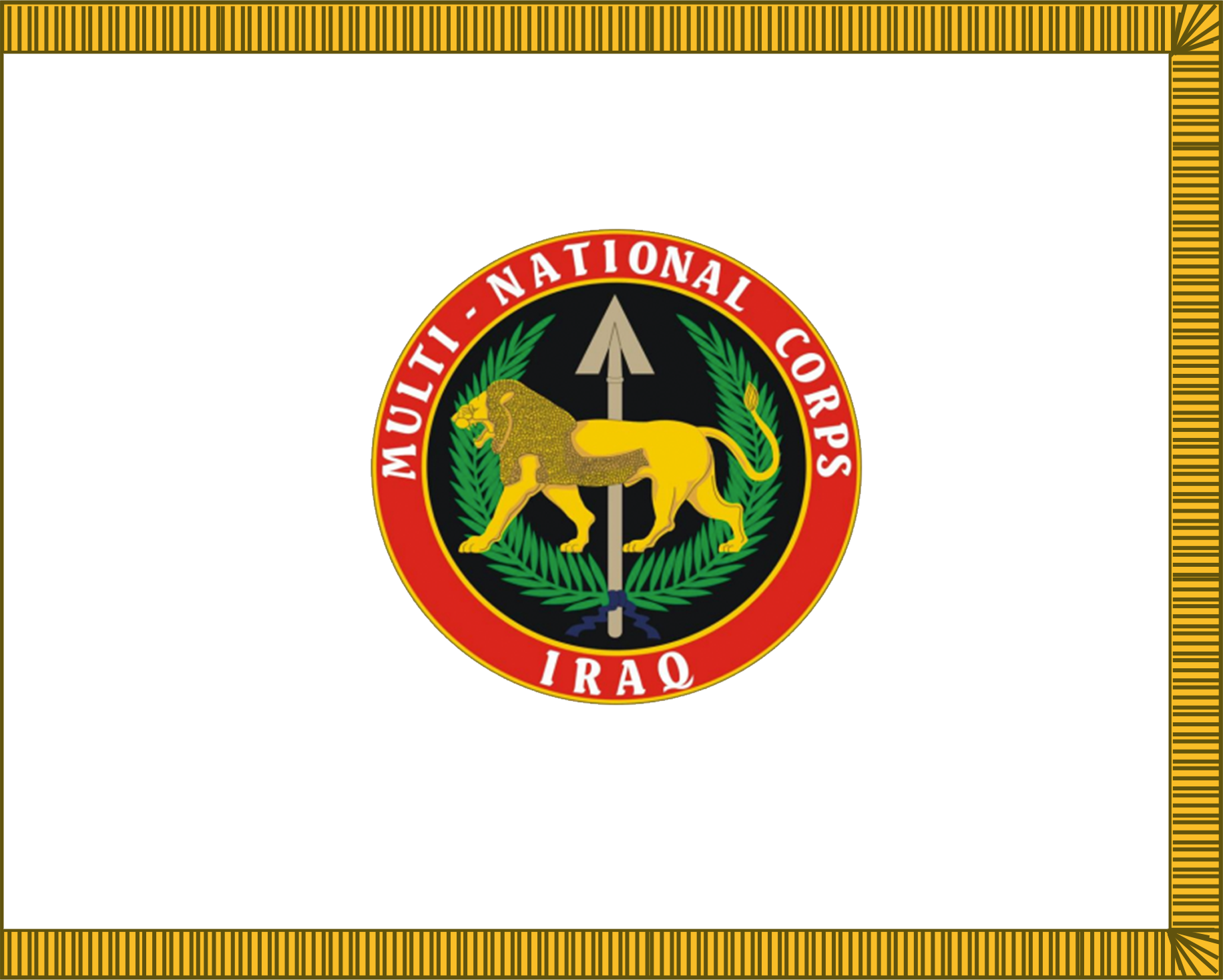
- Multinational Corps Iraq Flag

Multi-National Corps – Iraq (MNC-I) was a formerly multinational, later U.S. only, army corps created on 15 May 2004, fighting the Iraq War. Its superior body, the Multi-National Force-Iraq (MNF-I) had replaced Combined Joint Task Force 7 on May 15, 2004. The change was made due to "concerns that had existed for some period of time, that the Combined Joint Task Force 7 headquarters was not sufficient to handle the range of military operations in Iraq, including peace support, civil military operations, and at the same time conduct strategic engagement such as talking to the sheiks and talking to the political authorities."

Multi-National Force-Iraq was established to handle strategic level issues while Multi-National Corps – Iraq, a subordinate command, directed the tactical battle. A number of US Army corps headquarters rotated into Iraq to provide the MNC-I headquarters. Also created under MNF-I was the Multi-National Security Transition Command - Iraq (MNSTC-I), which primarily directed the reconstruction of Iraqi security forces. With the drawdown of US forces from Iraq per the Status of Forces Agreement and President George W. Bush's announced timeline, Multi-National Corps – Iraq merged back into its parent command of MNF-I, which was renamed United States Forces – Iraq (USF-I) following the withdrawal of all remaining coalition partners from the country.

Canadian Major Generals Walter Natynczyk, Peter Devlin, and Nicholas Matern served as Deputy Commanding Generals of Multi-National Corps – Iraq. In 2005, the 1st Corps Support Command based at Logistics Support Area Anaconda at Balad, Iraq, was providing theatre logistics support.

== Rotation deployment ==
=== OIF-3 ===
The two units in OIF Rotation (OIF-3) deployed July 2004, were the U.S. Army 3rd Infantry Division and the 42nd Infantry Division of the New York National Guard. The 3rd Infantry Division headquarters commanded two brigades of the division and the 256th Infantry Brigade of the Louisiana National Guard. The division relieved the 1st Cavalry Division in and around Baghdad.

The complete OIF-3 rotation to brigade level under MNF-I was as follows:

Headquarters XVIII Airborne Corps

- 29th Infantry Brigade Combat Team, Hawaii Army National Guard
- 56th Brigade Combat Team, 36th Infantry Division, Texas Army National Guard
- 185 Aviation Brigade (Mississippi Army National Guard)
- Task Force Freedom – MNF-Northwest
  - 11th Armored Cavalry Regiment (acting as TF HQ)
  - 3rd Armored Cavalry Regiment
  - 1st Stryker Brigade Combat Team, 25th Infantry Division
- 3rd Infantry Division - MND Baghdad
  - 2nd Brigade Combat Team, 3rd ID
  - 4th Brigade Combat Team, 3rd ID
  - 3rd Brigade Combat Team, 1st Armored Division (United States) (Fort Riley, Kansas)
  - 2nd Brigade Combat Team, 10th Mountain Division
  - 256th Brigade Combat Team (Louisiana Army National Guard)
    - 152nd Maintenance Company | Maine Army National Guard
- 42nd Infantry Division (Army National Guard)
  - 1st Brigade Combat Team, 3rd ID
  - 3rd Brigade Combat Team, 3rd ID
  - 116th Cavalry Brigade Combat Team Idaho Army National Guard (U.S. Army National Guard)
  - 278th Armored Cavalry Regiment Regimental Combat Team (Tennessee Army National Guard)
- II MEF (Fwd)/2nd Marine Division – Multi-National Force West
  - Regimental Combat Team-2
  - Regimental Combat Team-6
  - 2nd Brigade Combat Team, 2nd Infantry Division
  - 155th Heavy Brigade Combat Team (Mississippi Army National Guard)
  - 1st Corps Support Command

=== OIF-4 ===
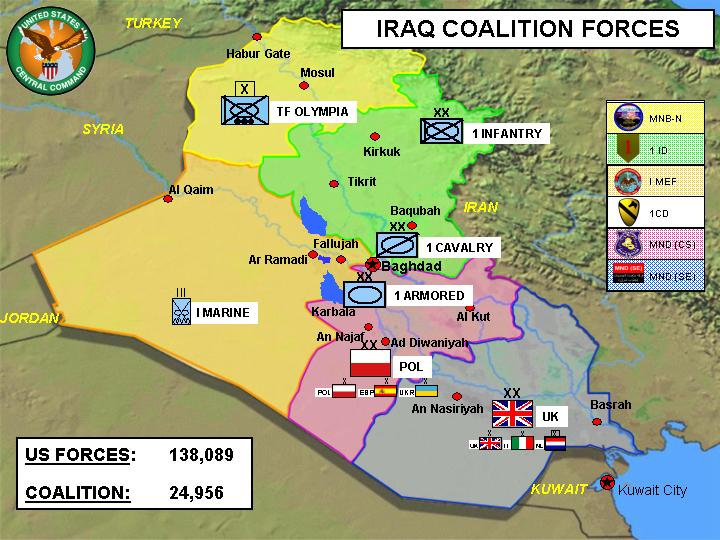
Areas of Responsibility in Iraq as at 30 April 2004

The OIF 4 rotation was announced on 14 December 2004.

The 4th Infantry Division's second deployment to Iraq began in the fall of 2005. The division headquarters replaced the 3rd Infantry Division, which had been directing security operations as the headquarters for Multi-National Division - Baghdad. The 4th assumed responsibility on January 7, 2006 for four provinces in central and southern Iraq: Baghdad, Karbala, An-Najaf and Babil. On 7 January 2006, MND-Baghdad also assumed responsibility for training Iraqi security forces and conducting security operations in the four provinces.

The 36th Aviation Brigade's subordination is unclear. It is definitely deployed within MNF-I but whether it is actually under 4th Infantry Division/MND Baghdad is unknown.

The complete rotation to brigade level under MNF-I is as follows:

Headquarters: V Corps (Fwd)

- 2nd Brigade Combat Team, 1st AD (forward based in Kuwait)
- 48th Infantry Brigade Combat Team Georgia Army National Guard (ARNG)
- 36th Combat Aviation Brigade (Army National Guard)
- 4th Infantry Division (MND Baghdad)
- 185 Aviation Brigade (Mississippi Army National Guard)
  - 1st Brigade Combat Team, 4th ID
  - 2nd Brigade Combat Team, 4th ID
  - 4th Brigade Combat Team, 4th ID
  - 1st Brigade Combat Team, 10th Mountain Division
    - 152nd Maintenance Company | Maine Army National Guard
  - 2nd Brigade Combat Team, 101st Airborne Division
  - 4th Brigade Combat Team, 101st Airborne Division
- 101st Airborne Division (Air Assault)
  - 1st Brigade Combat Team, 1st AD
  - 3rd Heavy Brigade Combat Team, 4th ID
  - 1st Brigade Combat Team, 101st Airborne Division
  - 3rd Brigade Combat Team, 101st Airborne Division
  - 172nd Infantry Brigade Combat Team
- I MEF (Fwd)/1st Marine Division
  - RCT-5
  - RCT-7
  - 2nd Brigade Combat Team, 28th ID (ARNG)

=== OIF 06-08 ===
The Pentagon announced on 20 June 2006 the units that will be deploying to Iraq as part of the OIF 06-08 rotation of forces:

- III Corps Headquarters, Fort Hood, Texas U.S.A.
- II Marine Expeditionary Force, Camp Lejeune, North Carolina U.S.A.
- Division Headquarters, 2nd, 3rd and 4th Brigades (4th Brigade 1st CAV then based at Fort Bliss, TX before reflagging to 4 BCT 1 AD in 2008), 1st Cavalry Division, Fort Hood, Texas U.S.A.
- Division Headquarters, 3rd Brigade, 45th Sustainment Brigade and 25th Combat Aviation Brigade, 25th Infantry Division, Schofield Barracks, Hawaii U.S.A
- 4th Brigade, 25th Infantry Division, Fort Richardson, Alaska U.S.A.
- 2nd Brigade, 2nd Infantry Division, Fort Carson, Colorado U.S.A.
- 13th Corps Support Command, Fort Hood, Texas U.S.A.
- 2nd Brigade, United States Army 1st Infantry Division Schweinfurt, Germany
- 3rd Brigade, 82nd Airborne Division, Fort Bragg, North Carolina U.S.A.
- 2nd Brigade, 10th Mountain Division, Fort Drum, New York U.S.A.
- 36th Combat Aviation Brigade United States Army National Guard units from Texas, Alabama, Arkansas, Kansas, Missouri and Kentucky U.S.A.

=== OIF 07-09 ===
- 1st Combat Aviation Brigade, Fort Riley, Kansas
- 1st Brigade Combat Team, 82nd Airborne Division, Fort Bragg, North Carolina
- XVIII Airborne Corps Headquarters, Fort Bragg, North Carolina
- Division Headquarters, 3rd and 4th Brigades, 4th Infantry Division, Fort Hood, Texas
- Division Headquarters, 1st Armored Division, Wiesbaden, Germany
- Division Headquarters, 1st, 3rd and 4th Brigades, 3rd Infantry Division, Fort Stewart
- 2nd Brigade, 25th Infantry Division, Schofield Barracks, Hawaii
- III Corps Support Command, Fort Knox, Kentucky
- 2nd Stryker Cavalry Regiment
- 3rd Armored Cavalry Regiment, Fort Hood
- 316th Sustainment Command (Expeditionary), Army Reserve, Coraopolis, PA

=== OIF 09-11 ===
- 1st Brigade Combat Team, 82nd Airborne Division, Fort Bragg, North Carolina U.S.A.
- I Corps (United States) Headquarters, Fort Lewis, Washington U.S.A
- 1st Cavalry Division Headquarters, Fort Hood, Texas U.S.A.
- 10th Mountain Division Headquarters, Fort Drum, New York U.S.A.
- 34th Infantry Division (United States) Headquarters, Rosemount, Minnesota U.S.A.
- 25th Infantry Division Headquarters, Schofield Barracks, Hawaii U.S.A.
- 3rd Infantry Division Headquarters, Fort Stewart, Georgia U.S.A.
- 2nd Marine Expeditionary Force Headquarters, Camp Lejune, North Carolina U.S.A.
- 28th Infantry Division 56th Stryker Brigade, Willow Grove, Pennsylvania U.S.A.
- 28th Infantry Division 28th Combat Aviation Brigade, Fort Indiantown Gap, Pennsylvania U.S.A.
- 772nd Military Police Company (United States) Taunton, Massachusetts U.S.A.

Multi-National Corps-Iraq oversaw divisions in the north of Iraq (MND-N), in Baghdad (MND-B), and in the south (MND-S).

MND-S was itself a fusion of two former multi-national (UK and Australia) divisions: Multi-National Division-Center (MND-C) and the British led Multi-National Division – Southeast (MND-SE). The withdrawal of MND-SE ended non-U.S. "coalition force" deployment in Iraq.

The United States Marine Corps had sole responsibility for "West Iraq".

== See also ==
- Iraq War order of battle

== Sources and external links ==
- MNF-I Official Arabic-language Site
- MNF-I Official English-language Site
- Institute for the Study of War
- Defendamerica.mil, First Army Guard aviation brigade called to duty, August 2006
- Stars and Stripes, 15th MEU in Kuwait, training for move into Anbar province, November 18, 2006
- CFLCC moves, GlobalSecurity.org
- British Casualty Monitor: Tracking the war in Iraq
