= 98 Squadron =

98 Squadron or 98th Squadron may refer to:

- 98th Southern Range Support Squadron, a unit of the Czech Air Force
- 98th Fighter-Interceptor Squadron, a unit of the United States Air Force
- No. 98 Squadron RAF, a unit of the British Royal Air Force
- Destroyer Squadron 28, a United of the United States Navy
- VPB-98, a United of the United States Navy

== See also ==
- 98th Division (disambiguation)
- 98th Regiment (disambiguation)
