= Forward Operating Base Dogwood =

Forward Operating Base Dogwood or FOB Dogwood, further to the north of the original Camp Dogwood, from late 2004 to 2005. Between Fallujah and Karbala. Also referred to as Camp Dogwood.

FOB Dogwood was occupied by the 549 ASMC March 03 - till about June 2003.

671st Engineering Company (MRB) Army Reserves Unit out of Portland, OR & Everitt, WA was deployed to Dogwood, Iraq from March 2003 to Sept. 2003, where their responsibilities included gate security, manning checkpoints and Combat Outposts (COPs), overseeing enemy prisoners, patrolling the Tigris/Euphrates rivers and constructing Camp Dogwood.

1st Armored Division DISCOM from May 2003 to Nov 2003. This included the 123rd Main Support Battalion, 41st Artillery Brigade, and elements of the 501st Military Police Company and the 307th MPs. Also Bravo Company 389th. Engineer Battalion, which built the first Iraqi Civil Defense Corp Training Facility at LogBase Dogwood.

This base was opened in late 2004 to be a temporary base during the January 2005 Iraqi elections but remained open 2005. It was occupied by Task Force 150th Engineers, Mississippi National Guard and was visited by Mississippi Governor Haley Barbour in November 2005.

An attachment, CAAT III, from the Anti-Terrorism Battalion reinforced with mortars came in and shut the base down. Numerous vehicle patrols were conducted around the area. They also provided security during operation trident.

Other bases occupied by the 155th Armored Brigade Combat Team included FOB Kalsu, FOB Duke, FOB Iskandariyah and FOB Hit.
