= Iraq War order of battle, 2009 =

Order of battle

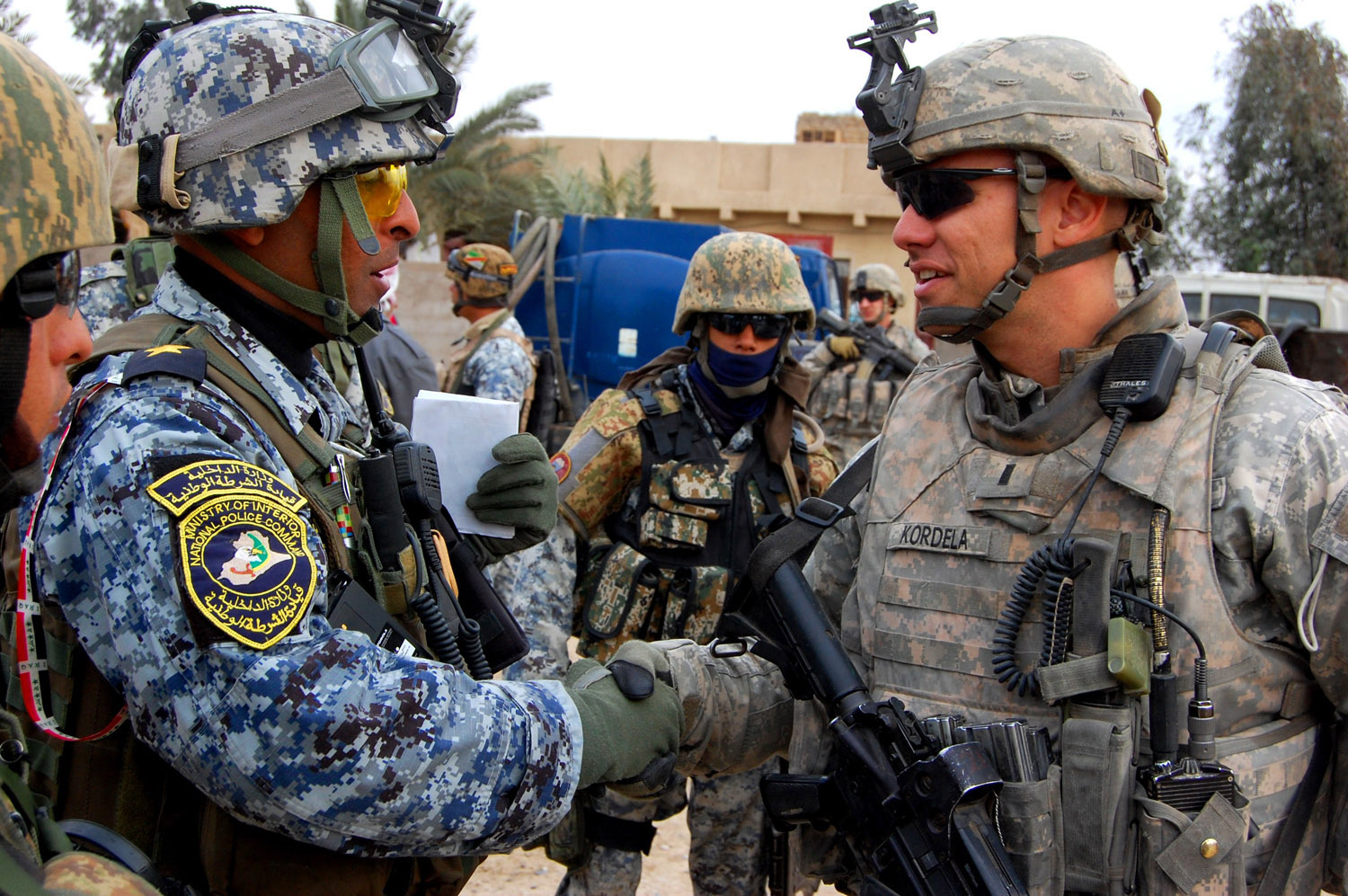
A U.S. Army officer from the 4th Infantry Division with an Iraqi policeman in January 2009.

Below is an estimated list of the major units deployed within the Multi-National Force – Iraq and other United States military units that were operating in Iraq under the U.S. Central Command (USCENTCOM) in 2009, during the Iraq War.

In military science terminology, the description of the units involved in an operation is known as the order of battle (ORBAT). NATO and the U.S. Department of Defense define the order of battle as the identification, strength, command structure, and disposition of the personnel, units, and equipment of any military force.

From September 2008 to 31 December 2009, the overall military commander in Iraq was General Raymond T. Odierno, Commander, Multi-National Force - Iraq (MNF-I) who reported to United States Central Command. MNF-I replaced Combined Joint Task Force 7 in May 2004. MNF-I consisted of Multi-National Corps - Iraq, Multi-National Security Transition Command - Iraq (MNSTC-I), and the Joint Contracting Command, Iraq/Afghanistan (JCCIA).

On January 1, 2010, Multi-National Force Iraq became United States Forces - Iraq.

== Special Operations Task Forces ==
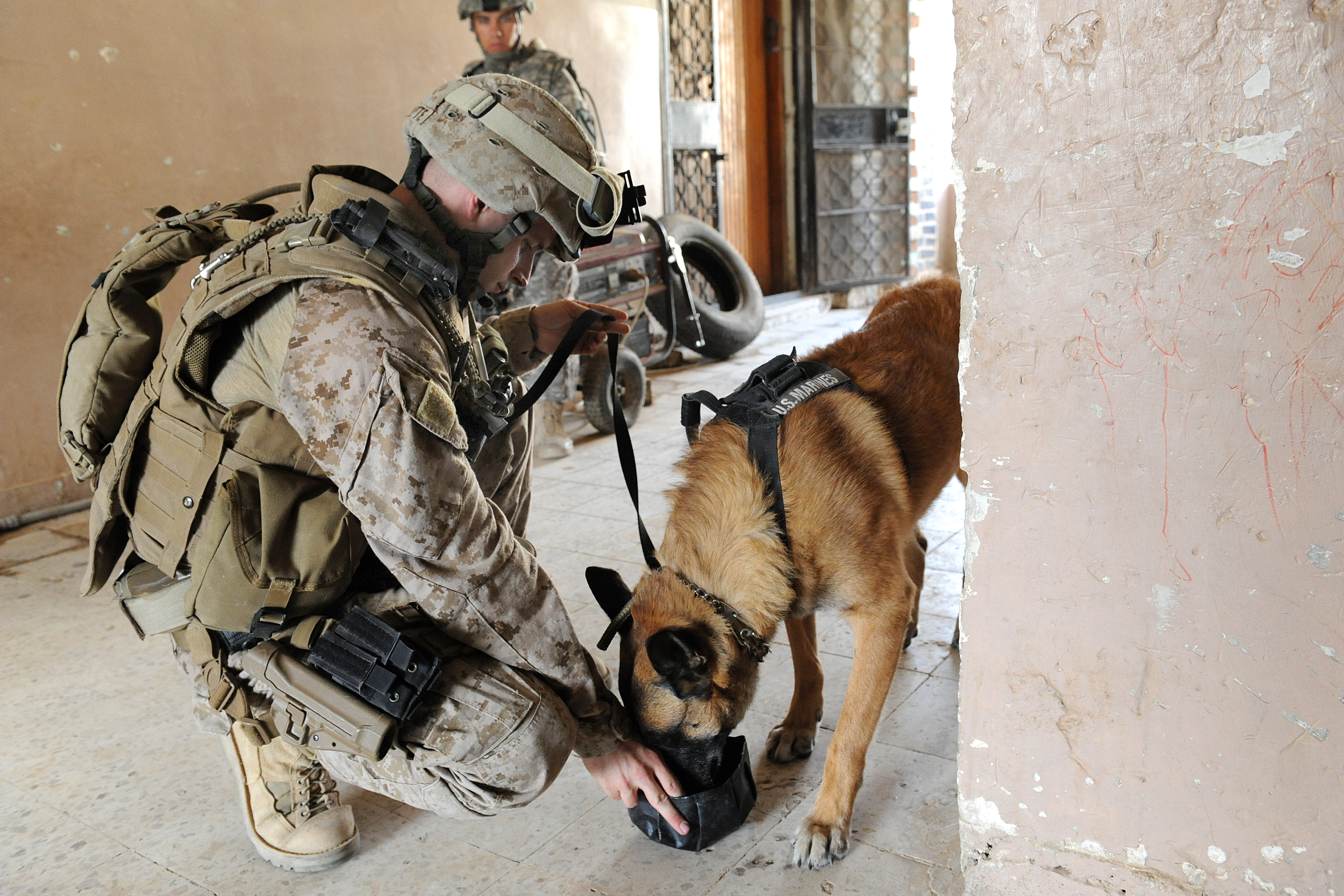
A U.S. Marine Corps canine handler in June 2009.

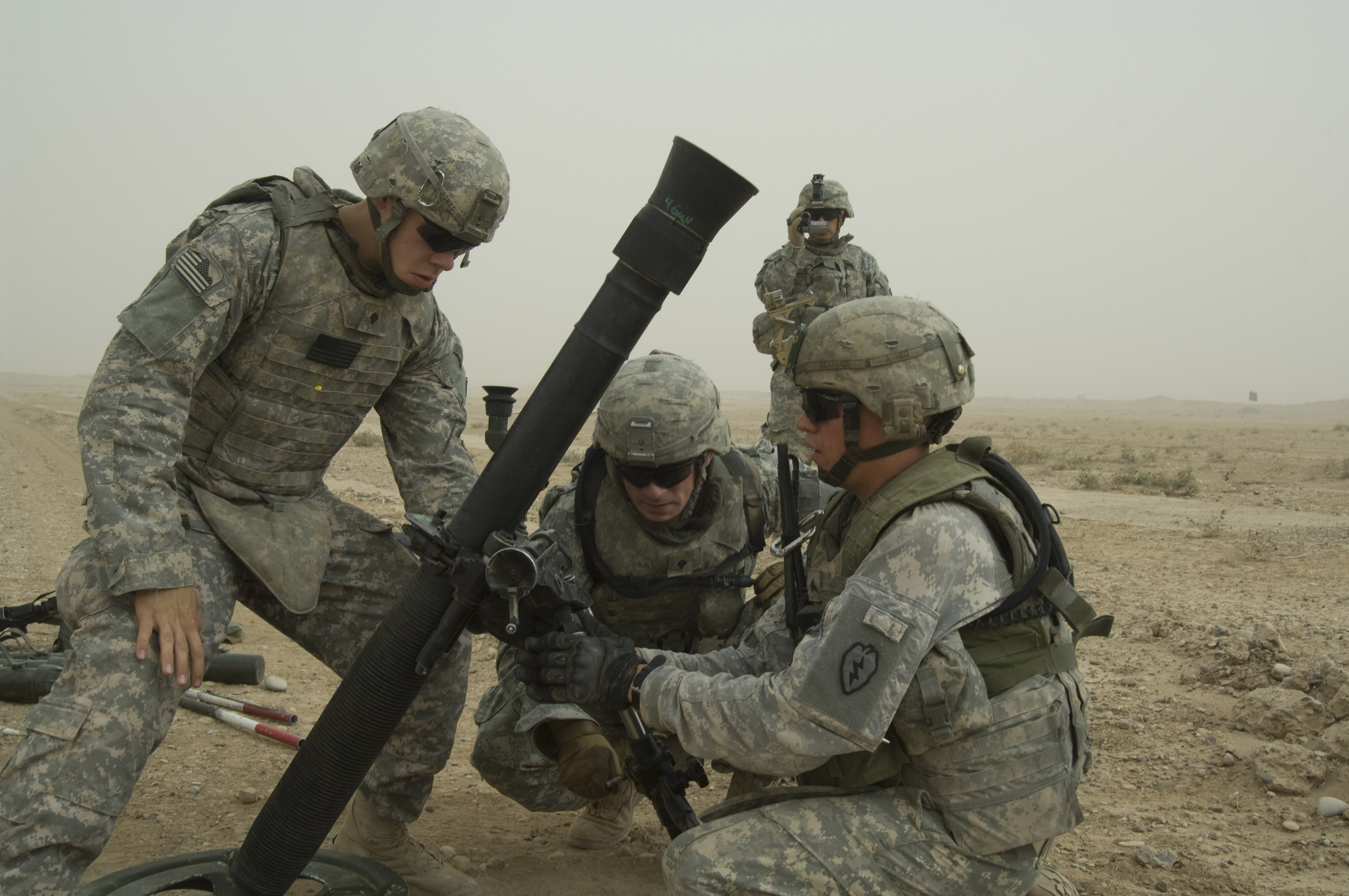
A U.S. Army mortar team from the 21st Infantry Regiment in June 2009.

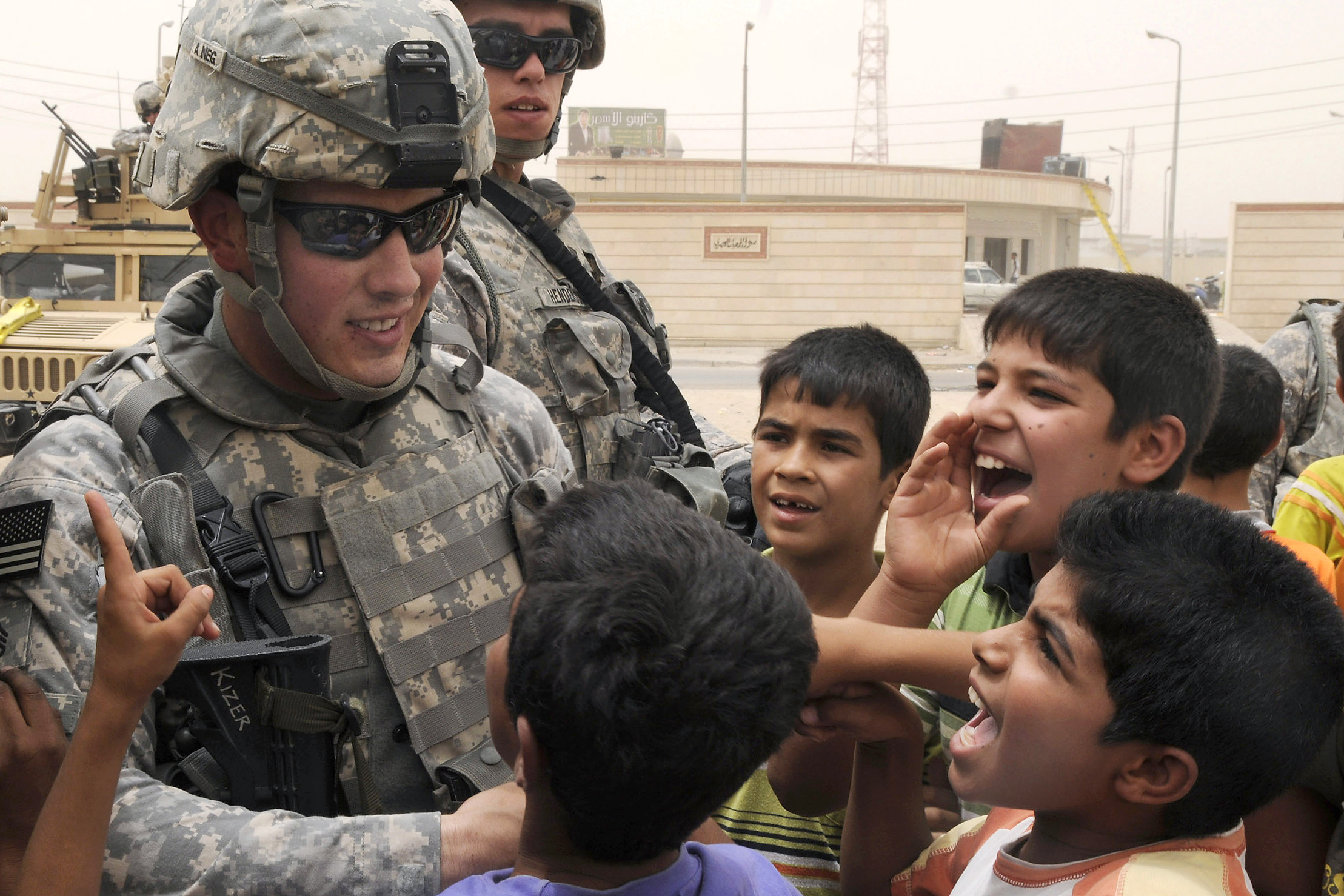
U.S. Army soldiers from the 445th Civil Affairs Battalion with Iraqi children in July 2009.

There is a distinction in U.S. military terms between the troops of Multinational Force-Iraq and forces which fall directly under CENTCOM's control but are in Iraq also. There are two special operations task forces operating in Iraq, Task Force 77 and CJSOTF-AP. Though TF 77, a 'black' force, does not answer to MNF-Iraq, it is included here for the sake of completeness of the U.S. forces operating within Iraq. TF 77 was under the command of the Joint Special Operations Command and its principal mission was to hunt down the leaders of al-Qaeda in Iraq (AQI).

- Task Force 77—LSA Anaconda, Balad
  - TF North/unidentified battalion 75th Ranger Regiment—unknown location, northern Iraq
  - TF West/unidentified element, DEVGRU—unknown location, western Iraq
  - TF Center/unidentified squadron, 1st Special Forces Operational Detachment - Delta—LSA Anaconda
  - TF Black/unidentified squadron, 22nd Special Air Service, Baghdad and Basra area

The second force, which appears to be separate from TF 77, is the Combined Joint Special Operations Task Force-Arabian Peninsula (CJSOTF-AP). CJSOTF-AP is a "white", or unclassified, special operations task force that as of 2008 was always organized around the headquarters of either 5th Special Forces Group or 10th Special Forces Group. Combined Joint Special Operations Task Force-Arabian Peninsula (CJSOTF-AP), itself answers to Special Operations Command Central.

== Order of battle as of 2009 ==
Unless otherwise noted, all units were U.S. in origin. This order of battle extends to battalion level and lists maneuver units only; artillery, support, special operations, and advisory units are not listed. Many brigade combat teams (BCTs) lent battalions to other BCTs during the course of their deployments, giving them "operational control" of those units. In such cases, the battalion's name is followed by "OPCON." Many higher-echelon units have two or more designations, often the formal unit around which the formation is based and then the name of the provisional task force; in these cases, both names are included, separated by a slash. Units were stationed at a variety of bases, including Forward Operating Bases (FOB), Contingency Operating Bases (COB) and Joint Security Stations (JSS).

=== Multi-National Corps - Iraq ===
(General Raymond Odierno)—Camp Victory, Baghdad

- Multi-National Corps Iraq/I Corps (Lieutenant General Charles H. Jacoby Junior) Was based at Camp Victory (primary component of the Victory Base Complex), north of Baghdad International Airport, and directed the following division-sized formations:
- 32nd Infantry Brigade Combat Team (32nd IBCT), Wisconsin Army National Guard (Colonel Steven Bensend)
  - Headquarters and Headquarters Company (HHC), 32nd Infantry Brigade Combat Team (32nd IBCT)—International Zone, Joint Area Support Group–Central
  - 2nd Battalion, 127th Infantry Regiment—rear area security, Camp Bucca, Iraq
  - 1st Battalion, 128th Infantry Regiment, Camp Cropper, Iraq
  - 1st Battalion, 120th Field Artillery Regiment (1-120th FAR), Camp Cropper, Iraq
  - 1st Squadron, 105th Cavalry Regiment, Camp Bucca, Iraq
  - 132nd Brigade Support Battalion (132nd BSB)—rear area security, Camp Bucca, Iraq
  - Brigade Special Troops Battalion (BSTB)
- 155th Brigade Combat Team (155th ABCT) (Colonel William L. Glasgow)— conducted base defense, force protection, personal protection and convoy escort security missions throughout Iraq
  - Headquarters, 155th ABCT
  - 106th Brigade Support Battalion (106th BSB)
  - 155th Brigade Special Troops Battalion (155th BSTB)
    - 2nd Squadron, 107th Cavalry Regiment, Troops Bravo and Charlie (OHARNG) - Camp Taji
  - 2nd Battalion, 114th Field Artillery Regiment (2-114th FAR)
  - 1st Battalion, 155th Infantry Regiment (Joint Base Balad)
  - 1st Battalion, 98th Cavalry Regiment
  - 2nd Battalion, 198th Combined Arms Battalion (2-198th CAB)
- 29th Brigade Combat Team (29th BCT), Hawaii Army National Guard (Colonel Bruce E. Oliveira)
  - Headquarters and Headquarters Company (HHC), 29th Brigade Combat Team (29th BCT)—Camp Arifjan, Kuwait
  - 29th Brigade Special Troops Battalion (29th BSTB)
  - 29th Brigade Support Battalion (29th BSB)
  - 1st Squadron, 299th Cavalry Regiment—Camp Virginia, Kuwait
  - 1st Battalion, 487th Field Artillery Regiment (1-487th FAR)
  - 1st Battalion, 184th Infantry Regiment (Air Assault) Al Saqr-Camp Falcon, Baghdad. Patrolled the most dangerous part of Downtown Baghdad Al Dora, Karada Street, Horajab, Al Sadr City.
  - 100th Battalion, 442nd Infantry Regiment (Army Reserve)—Camp Arifjan, Kuwait
- 41st Infantry Brigade Combat Team (41st IBCT), Oregon Army National Guard (Colonel Daniel R. Hokanson)—Camp Victory, Baghdad
  - 2nd Battalion, 162nd Infantry Regiment
  - 1st Battalion, 186th Infantry Regiment
  - 2nd Battalion, 218th Field Artillery Regiment (2-218th FAR)
  - 41st Special Troops Battalion
  - 141st Support Battalion
  - 1st Squadron, 82nd Cavalry Regiment

==== Multi-National Division Baghdad ====
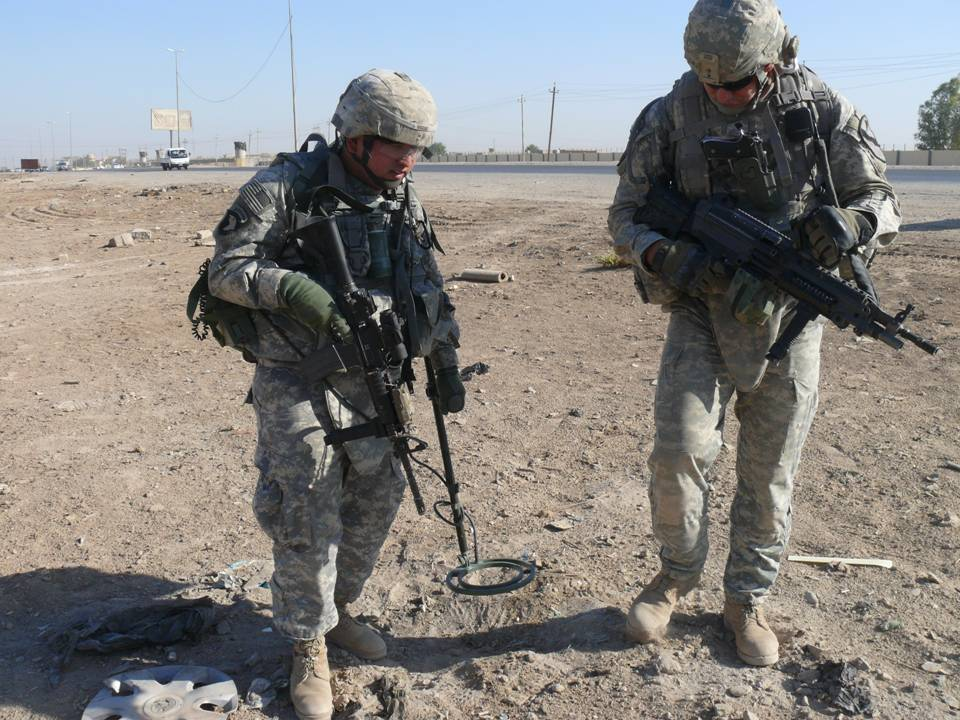
U.S. Army soldiers from the 1st Cavalry Division mine-sweeping near a Baghdad highway in October 2009.

1st Cavalry Division (Major General Daniel P. Bolger)—Camp Victory, Baghdad
Also known as Task Force Baghdad, this division headquarters was provided by the 1st Cavalry Division. The division's area of responsibility (AOR) was the city of Baghdad. MND-B headquarters was previously provided by Headquarters 1st Armored Division (2003–2004), Headquarters 1st Cavalry Division (2004), Headquarters 3rd Infantry Division (2004–2005), Headquarters 4th Infantry Division (2005–2006) and Headquarters 1st Cavalry Division (2006–2007), Headquarters 4th Infantry Division (2007–2009), Headquarters 1st Cavalry Division (2009–2010).

- 1st BCT, 1st Cavalry Division (Colonel Tobin Green)
  - 2nd Battalion, 5th Cavalry Regiment
  - 1st Squadron, 7th Cavalry Regiment
  - 2nd Battalion, 8th Cavalry Regiment
  - 1st Battalion, 82nd Field Artillery Regiment (1-82nd FAR)
  - 115th Brigade Support Battalion (115th BSB)
  - 1st Brigade Special Troops Battalion (1st BSTB)—Joint Security Station War Eagle
- 56th Stryker Brigade Combat Team (56th SBCT), 28th Infantry Division, Pennsylvania Army National Guard (Colonel Marc Ferraro)—Camp Taji, Taji
  - 1st Battalion, 111th Infantry Regiment, [Tarmiyah, Iraq]
  - 1st Battalion, 112th Infantry Regiment
  - 2nd Squadron 104th Cavalry Regiment
  - 328th Brigade Support Battalion (328th BSB)
  - 856th Engineer Company
  - 1st Battalion, 108th Field Artillery Regiment (1-108th FAR)
  - D Company (Anti-Tank), 112th Infantry Regiment
  - 656th Signal Company
  - 556th Military Intelligence Company (556th MIC)

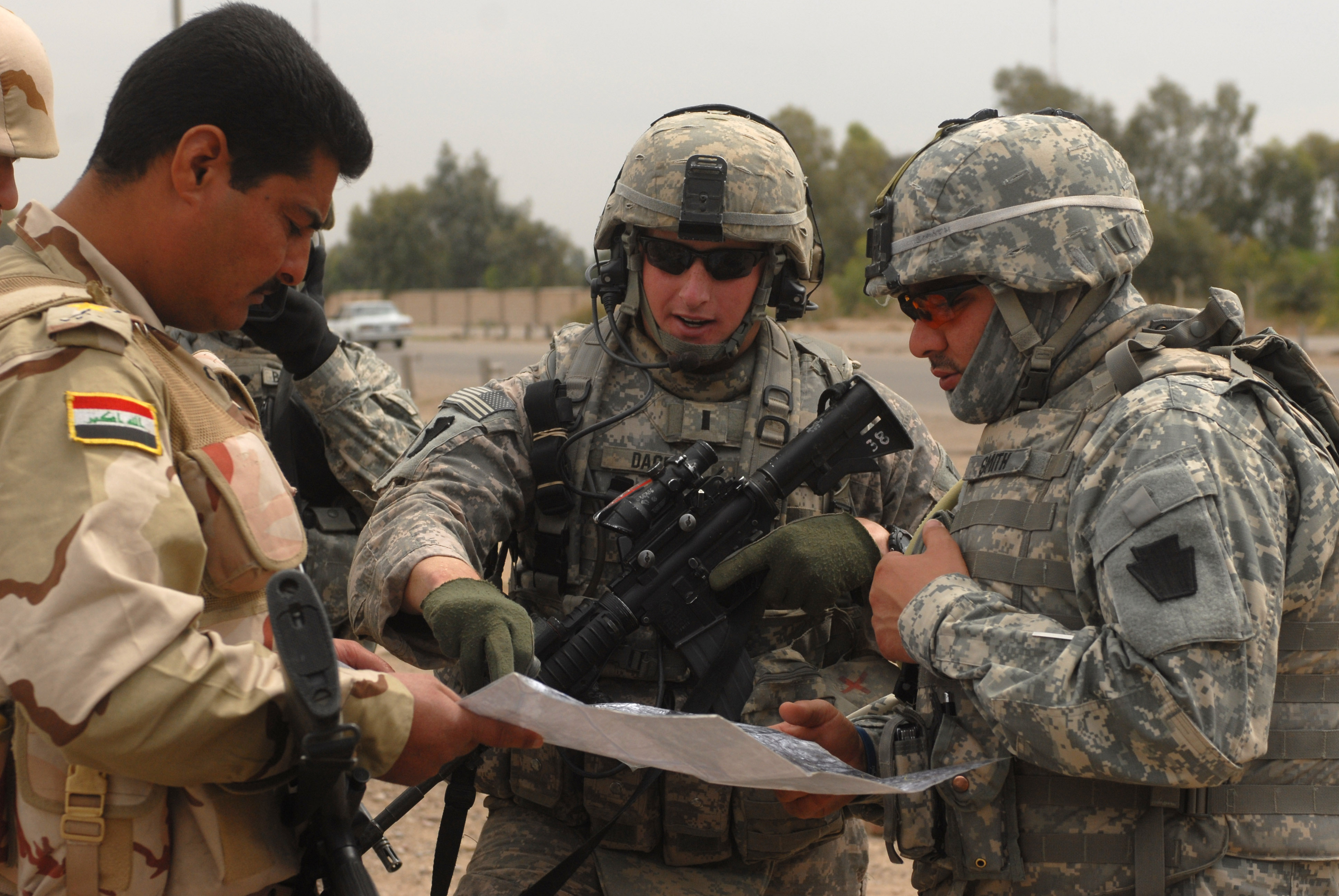
A U.S. Army officer from the 1st Infantry Division with Iraqi soldiers in March 2009.

- 2nd BCT, 1st Infantry Division (Colonel Joseph M. Martin)—Camp Liberty, Baghdad
  - 1st Battalion, 18th Infantry Regiment
  - 1st Battalion, 63rd Armor Regiment
  - 5th Squadron, 4th Cavalry Regiment
  - 1st Battalion, 7th Field Artillery Regiment (1-7th FAR)
  - Brigade Special Troops Battalion (BSTB)
  - 299th Brigade Support Battalion (299th BSB)
  - 70th Engineer Battalion
  - 2nd Battalion, 112th Infantry Regiment (OPCON from 56th Stryker Brigade Combat Team, Pennsylvania Army National Guard)
- 30th Heavy Brigade Combat Team (30th HBCT) (Colonel Gregory A. Lusk)—FOB Falcon, Rashid district, Baghdad
  - 1st Battalion, 120th Infantry Regiment
  - 1st Battalion, 252nd Armor Regiment
  - 1st Squadron, 150th Cavalry Regiment
  - 1st Battalion, 113th Field Artillery Regiment (1-113th FAR)
  - 230th Brigade Support Battalion (230th BSB)
  - 30th Brigade Special Troops Battalion (30th BSTB)

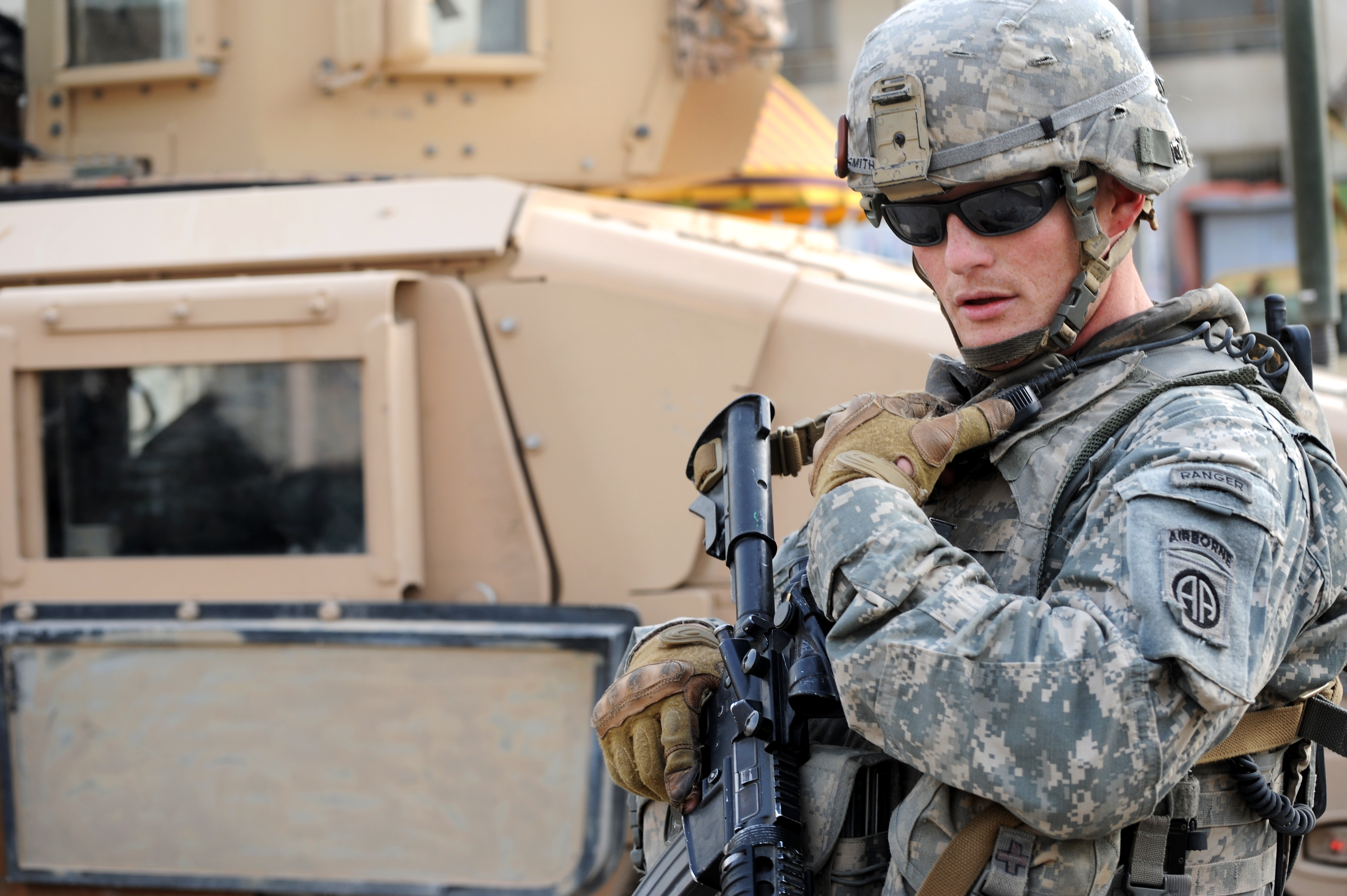
A U.S. Army officer from the 82nd Airborne Division in March 2009.

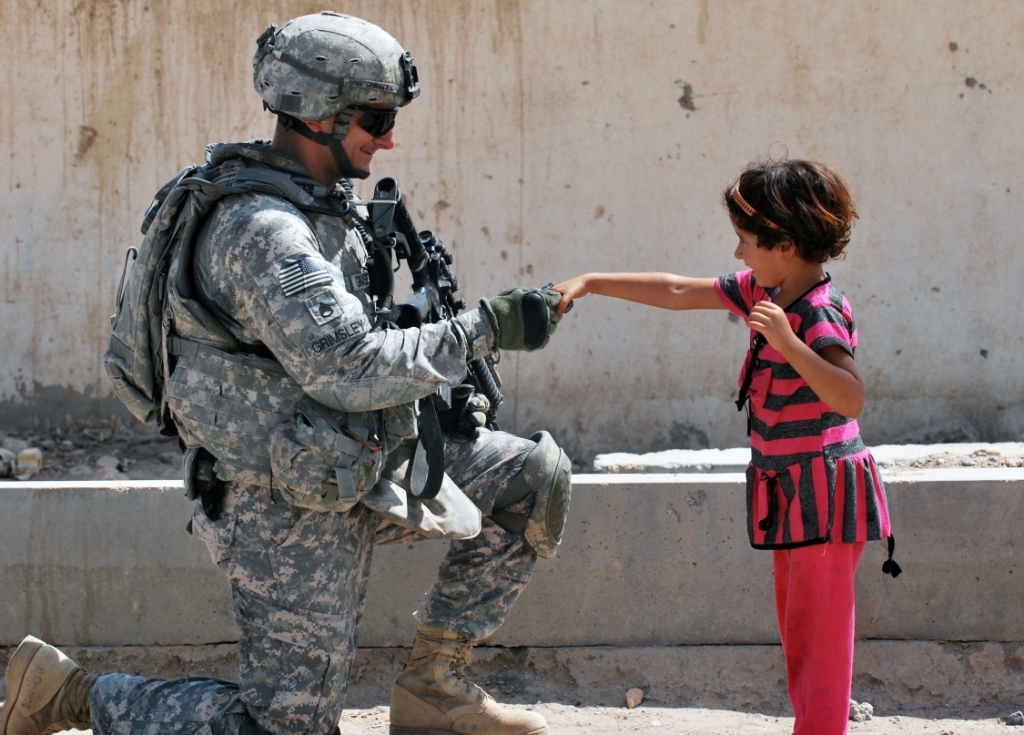
A U.S. Army soldier from the 82nd Airborne Division with an Iraqi child in August 2009.

- 3rd BCT, 82nd Airborne Division (Colonel Timothy McGuire)—FOB Loyalty, Baghdad
  - 1st Battalion, 505th Parachute Infantry Regiment (1-505th PIR)
  - 2nd Battalion, 505th Parachute Infantry Regiment (2-505th PIR)
  - 5th Squadron, 73rd Cavalry Regiment
  - 1st Battalion, 319th Field Artillery Regiment (1-319th FAR)
  - 3rd Brigade Special Troops Battalion (3rd BSTB)
  - 82nd Brigade Support Battalion (82nd BSB)
  - 1st Battalion, 5th Cavalry Regiment (OPCON from 2nd BCT, 1st Cavalry Division)—FOB War Eagle
- 1st Air Cavalry Brigade, 1st Cavalry Division (Colonel Douglas Gabram)—Camp Taji, Iraq
  - Headquarters and Headquarters Company (HHC)
  - 1st Battalion, 227th Aviation Regiment
  - 2nd Battalion, 227th Aviation Regiment
  - 3rd Battalion, 227th Aviation Regiment
  - 4th Battalion, 227th Aviation Regiment
  - 615th Aviation Support Battalion (615th ASB)
  - 1-64th Armor Battalion, 2nd Brigade, 3rd Infantry Division

==== Multi-National Division South ====
34th Infantry Division - (Major General Rick C. Nash)—Contingency Operating Base Basra
Multi-National Division South, also known as Task Force Mountain, assisted the Iraqi Armed Forces with security in the area south of Baghdad ranging from Najaf to Wasit provinces extending to Basra. MND-South headquarters was provided by the 10th Mountain Division (Light) from Fort Drum, New York. The areas south of Baghdad were previously organized into Multi-National Division-Center, under U.S. leadership, and Multi-National Division (South East), which was provided by the British Army. The areas were merged into MND-South on March 31, 2009, to reflect the departure of the UK from Iraq. MND-Center took in portions of the area previously controlled by the long-disbanded Polish-led Multi-National Division Central-South.

The 34th Division transferred control of MND/USD-South to the 1st Infantry Division on February 2, 2010.

  - 34th Infantry Division Headquarters
  - 34th Infantry Division Special Troops Battalion
  - 34th Military Police Company (34th MPC)
  - 34th Infantry Division Band
- 4th BCT, 1st Armored Division (Colonel Peter Newell)
  - 4th Battalion, 6th Infantry Regiment
  - 2nd Squadron, 13th Cavalry Regiment
  - 1st Battalion, 77th Armor Regiment—COB Adder, Iraq
  - 2nd Battalion, 29th Field Artillery Regiment (2-29th FAR)—COB Adder, Iraq
  - 121st Brigade Support Battalion (121st BSB)
  - 4th Brigade Special Troops Battalion (4th BSTB)
- 172nd Infantry Brigade, Forward Operating Base Kalsu
  - 1st Battalion, 2nd Infantry Regiment
  - 2nd Battalion, 28th Infantry Regiment
  - 3rd Battalion, 66th Armor Regiment
  - 1st Battalion, 77th Field Artillery Regiment (1-77th FAR)
  - 9th Engineer Battalion
  - 172nd Support Battalion
  - 57th Signal Company
  - C Company, 504th Battlefield Surveillance Brigade (C-504th BFSB)
  - E Troop, 5th Cavalry Regiment
  - 3rd Battalion, 16th Field Artillery Regiment (Lieutenant Colonel Barren) (OPCON from 2nd BCT, 4th Infantry Division)—Convoy Support Center Scania
- 17th Fires Brigade (Colonel Steven L. Bullimore)—Contingency Operating Base Basra
  - Headquarters and Headquarters Battery (HHB), 17th Fires Brigade
  - 256th Signal Company
  - F Battery, 26th Field Artillery Regiment (F-26th FAR)
  - 5th Battalion 3rd Field Artillery Regiment (5-3rd FAR)
  - 1st Battalion, 94th Field Artillery Regiment (1-94th FAR)
  - 1st Battalion, 377th Field Artillery Regiment (1-377th FAR)
  - 308th Brigade Support Battalion (308th BSB)
- Combat Aviation Brigade, 28th Infantry Division, Pennsylvania Army National Guard (Colonel Teresa Gallagher)—Contingency Operating Base Adder
  - Headquarters and Headquarters Company (HHC)
  - 1st Battalion, 104th Aviation Regiment (Attack) (1st Attack Battalion 104th Aviation Regiment)
  - 2nd Battalion, 104th Aviation Regiment (General Support) (2nd General Support Battalion 104th Aviation Regiment)
  - 1st Battalion, 150th Aviation Regiment (Assault) (1st Assault Battalion 150th Aviation Regiment) (NJARNG-VANDALS)
  - 1st Battalion, 224th Aviation Regiment (Security and Support) (1st Security and Support Battalion 224th Aviation Regiment)
  - 628th Aviation Support Battalion (628th ASB)
  - 1st Battalion, 130th Aviation Regiment (Attack Reconnaissance) (1st Attack Reconnaissance Battalion 130th Aviation Regiment)(LTC Jeff Copeland)(OPCON) (NCARNG-PANTHERS) (MND-S: Delta, Adder, Basra)

  - 2nd Battalion, 285th Aviation Regiment (1st Assault Battalion, 285th Aviation Regiment, AZARNG-REDHAWKS)(LTC Bush)

==== Multi-National Division North ====
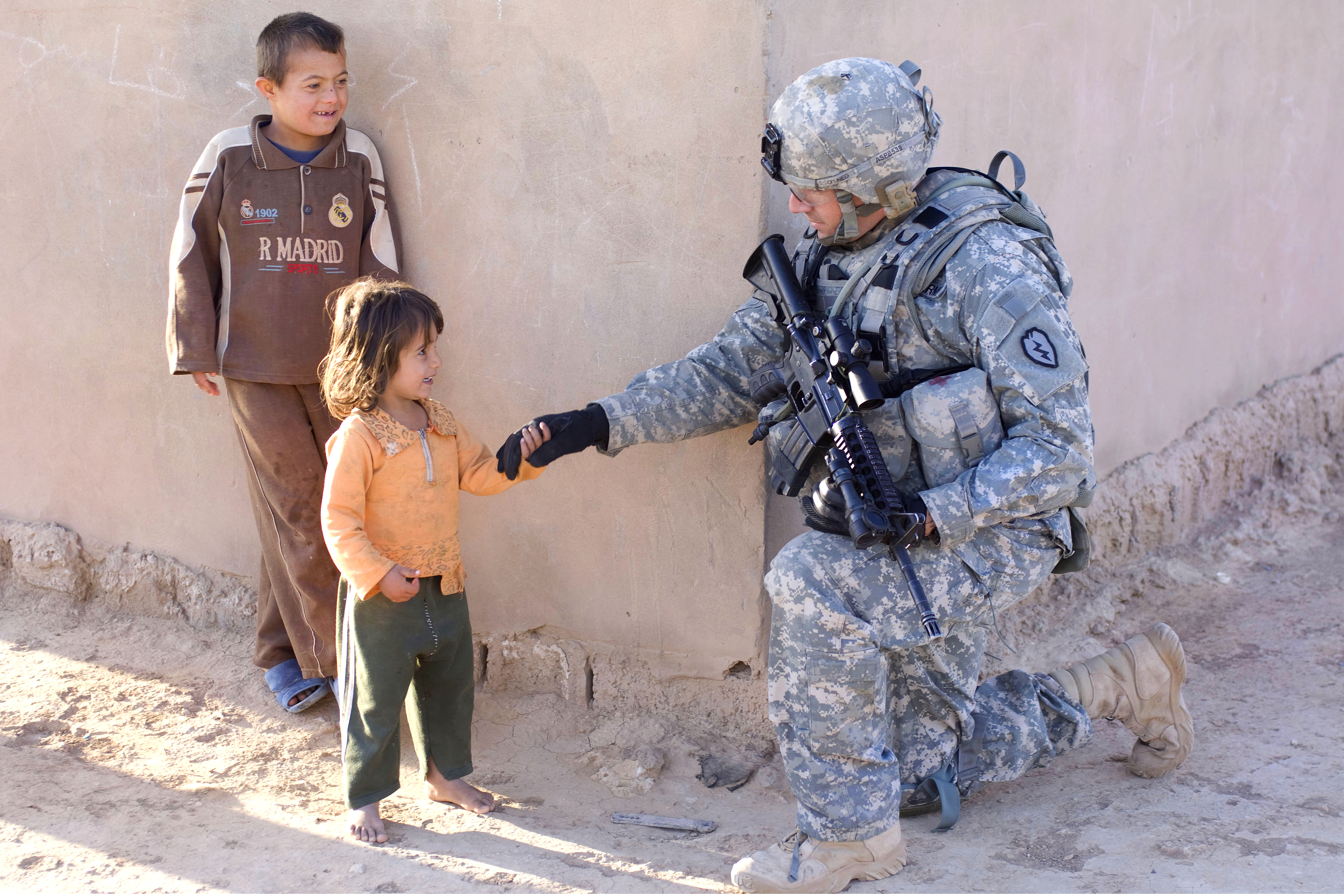
A U.S. Army soldier from the 25th Infantry Division with Iraqi children in March 2009.

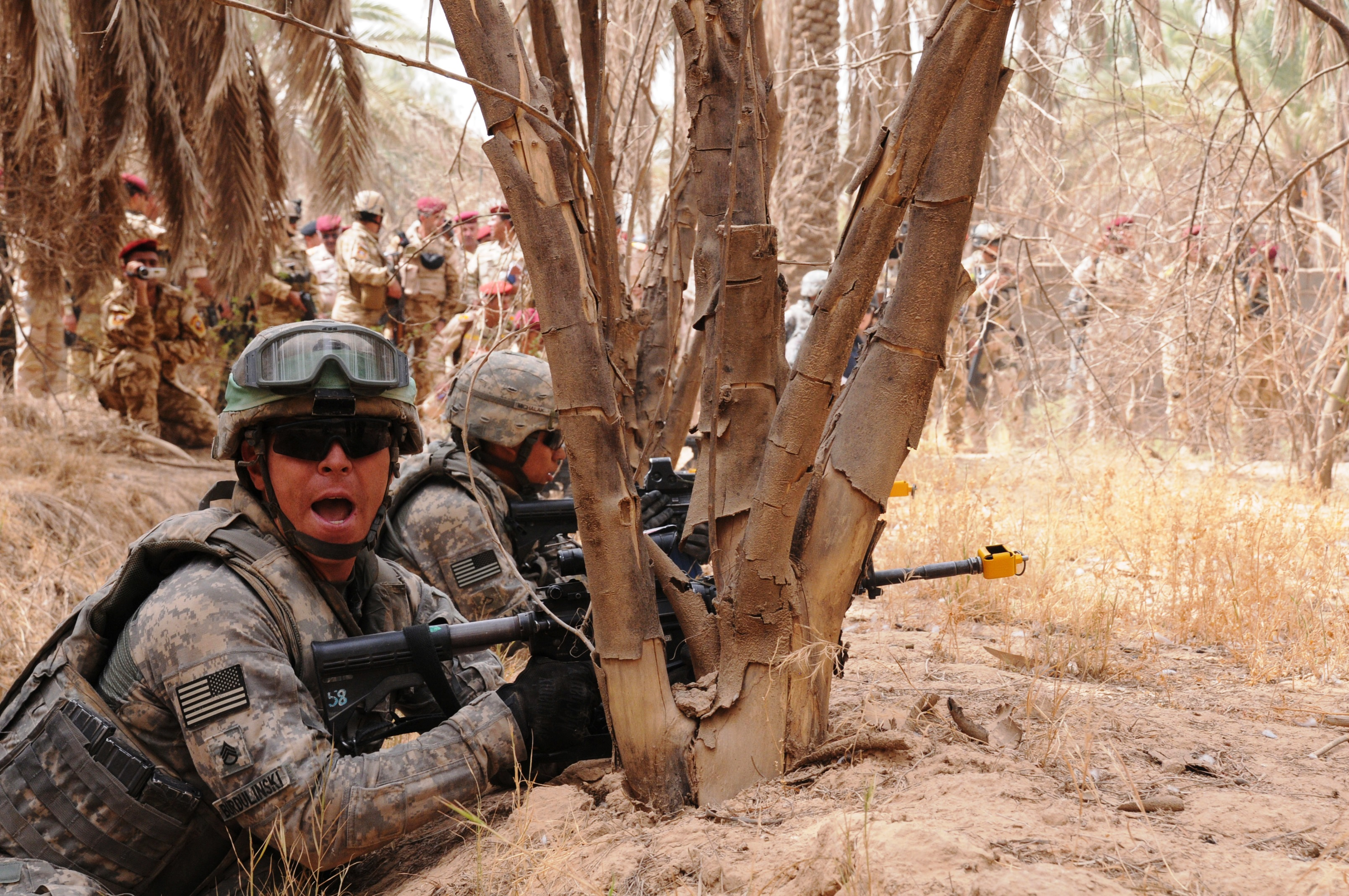
U.S. Army soldiers from the 25th Infantry Division demonstrating warfare maneuvers before Iraqi soldiers in September 2009.

25th Infantry Division/TF Lightning (Major General Robert L. Caslen Jr.)—COB Speicher, Tikrit

This division headquarters was provided by the 25th Infantry Division and was also known as Task Force Lightning. Its area of responsibility included the cities of Balad, Kirkuk, Tikrit, Mosul, and Samarra. It was based at Contingency Operating Base Speicher outside Tikrit, where one of its brigades was also stationed. It also had one brigade based in Mosul, one in Kirkuk, one at Taji, and one in Baqubah.

- 2nd BCT, 1st Cavalry Division (Colonel Ryan F. Gonsalves)—FOB Warrior, Kirkuk
  - 4th Squadron, 9th Cavalry Regiment
  - 1st Battalion, 8th Cavalry Regiment
  - 3rd Battalion, 82nd Field Artillery Regiment (3-82nd FAR)
  - 15th Brigade Support Battalion (15th BSB)
  - 2nd Brigade Special Troops Battalion (2nd BSTB)
- 3rd BCT, 1st Cavalry Division (Colonel Gary Volesky)—FOB Marez, Mosul
  - 6th Squadron, 9th Cavalry Regiment
  - 3rd Battalion, 8th Cavalry Regiment
  - 1st Battalion, 12th Cavalry Regiment
  - 2nd Battalion, 82nd Field Artillery Regiment (2-82nd FAR)
  - 215th Brigade Support Battalion (215th BSB)
  - 3rd Brigade Special Troops Battalion (3rd BSTB)
  - 1st Battalion, 67th Armor Regiment (Lieutenant Colonel Casey) (OPCON from 2nd BCT, 4th Infantry Division)—Mosul
- 3rd SBCT, 2nd Infantry Division (Colonel David Funk)—FOB Warhorse, Diyala province, Iraq
  - 1st Battalion, 23rd Infantry Regiment
  - 2nd Battalion, 3rd Infantry Regiment
  - 5th Battalion, 20th Infantry Regiment
  - 1st Squadron, 14th Cavalry Regiment
  - 1st Battalion, 37th Field Artillery Regiment (1-37th FAR)
  - 296th Brigade Support Battalion (296th BSB)
  - Headquarters and Headquarters Company (HHC), 3rd SBCT
  - 334th Signal Company
  - 209th Military Intelligence Company (209th MIC)
  - 18th Engineer Company
  - Charlie Company, 52nd Infantry Regiment (Anti-Tank)
- 3rd BCT, 25th Infantry Division (Colonel Walter E. Piatt)—COB Speicher, Tikrit
  - 2nd Battalion 27th Infantry Regiment
  - 2nd Battalion 35th Infantry Regiment
  - 3rd Special Troops Battalion
  - 3rd Battalion 7th Field Artillery Regiment (3-7th FAR)
  - 3rd Squadron (RSTA), 4th Cavalry Regiment
  - 325th Brigade Support Battalion (325th BSB)
- 10th Combat Aviation Brigade (10th CAB) (Colonel Erik C. Peterson)—COB Speicher, Tikrit
  - Headquarters and Headquarters Company (HHC), 10th Aviation Brigade
  - 277th Aviation Support Battalion (277th ASB)
  - 6th Squadron, 6th Cavalry Regiment
  - 1st Battalion, 10th Aviation Regiment
  - 2nd Battalion, 10th Aviation Regiment
  - 3rd Battalion, 10th Aviation Regiment
  - 1st Attack Reconnaissance Battalion (1st ARB)

==== Multi-National Force West ====
The seal of Multi-National Force West.

II Marine Expeditionary Force (Forward) (Major General Richard T. Tryon) — Al Asad Airbase

This formation headquarters was provided by the II Marine Expeditionary Force (Forward). It covered western Iraq, including Al Anbar Governorate and the cities of Ramadi and Fallujah, the area where Iraq's Sunni insurgency was at its strongest. Headquartered first at Camp Fallujah and then at Al Asad Airbase.

- Regimental Combat Team 6 (RCT 6) (Colonel Matthew A. Lopez) — Camp Ramadi
  - 1st Battalion, 7th Marines
  - 2nd Battalion, 23rd Marines
- Regimental Combat Team 8 (RCT 8) (Colonel John K. Love) — Al Asad Air Base
  - 3rd Battalion, 9th Marine Regiment
  - 3rd Light Armored Reconnaissance Battalion (3rd LARB)
  - 2nd Combat Engineer Battalion (2nd CEB)
- II MEF Headquarters Group (Forward) (Colonel Scott D. Aiken)
  - Headquarters and Service Company (HSC)
  - 1st Battalion, 8th Marine Regiment
  - 1st Battalion, 12th Marines-Task Force Military Police-Conducted Detainee operations and convoy support of Allied convoys
  - 3rd Battalion, 3rd Marines—Provides general convoy security in support of MNF-W convoys
  - Detachment, 2nd Intelligence Battalion
  - Detachment, 2nd Radio Battalion
  - 8th Communications Battalion
- Combat Logistics Regiment 27 (CLR 27) (Forward) (Colonel Vincent A. Coglianese)—Camp Al Taqaddum with detachments in Ramadi, Baharia, Al Asad and Sahl Sinjar
  - Combat Logistics Battalion 4 (CLB 4)
  - Combat Logistics Battalion 46 (CLB 46)
  - 2nd Supply Battalion
  - Naval Mobile Construction Battalion 24 (NMCB 24)
- 2nd Marine Aircraft Wing (2nd MAW) (Forward) (Brigadier General Robert S. Walsh)—Al Asad with detachments at Korean Village, Al Taqaddum, Al Qaim and other locations throughout the Al Anbar Province
  - Marine Wing Headquarters Squadron 2 (MWHS 2)
  - Marine Air Control Group 28 (MACG 28)
  - Marine Unmanned Aerial Vehicle Squadron 2 (VMU-2)
  - Marine Wing Support Squadron 271 (MWSS 271)
  - Marine Tactical Air Command Squadron 28 (MTACS 28)
  - Marine Air Support Squadron 1 (MASS 1)
  - Marine Air Control Squadron 2 (MACS 2)
  - Marine Air Control Squadron 24 (MACS 24)
  - Marine Wing Communications Squadron 28 (MWCS 28)
- Marine Aircraft Group 26 (MAG 26)
  - Marine Light Attack Helicopter Squadron 269 (HMLA-269)
  - Marine Aviation Logistics Squadron 26 (MALS 26)
  - Marine Medium Helicopter Squadron 268 (HMM-268)
  - Marine Heavy Helicopter Squadron 462 (HMH-462)
  - Company C, 5th Battalion, 158th Aviation Regiment (OPCON from 12th Combat Aviation Brigade)
  - Company B, 1st Battalion, 214th Aviation Regiment (OPCON from 12th Combat Aviation Brigade)
  - Marine Aerial Refueler Transport Squadron 252 (VMGR-252)
  - Marine Tactical Electronic Warfare Squadron 3 (VMAQ-3)
  - Marine Tactical Electronic Warfare Squadron 4 (VMAQ-4)
  - Marine Fighter Attack Squadron 314 (VMFA-314)

==== 3rd Sustainment Command (Expeditionary) ====
The 3rd Sustainment Command (Expeditionary) was the senior logistics command under Multi-National Corps-Iraq in support of Operation Iraqi Freedom 08–10. Its headquarters was located at Joint Base Balad.

Located approximately 40 miles north of Baghdad, Joint Base Balad was home to the headquarters of the U.S. Air Force's 332nd Air Expeditionary Wing. It was formerly known as Logistics Support Area Anaconda, the largest army supply center in Iraq.

=== Training ===
Multi-National Security Transition Command - Iraq also played an important role.

== United States Naval Forces in Iraq ==
The U.S. Navy Riverine Squadrons are elements of the Navy Expeditionary Combat Command (NECC) which took an active part in land operations in support of the Army and Marine units. According to the Navy: "The Navy's Riverine force focuses on conducting Maritime Security Operations and Theater Security Cooperation in a riverine area of operations or other suitable area. The force is capable of combating enemy riverine forces by applying fires directly, or by coordinating supporting fires. It will share battle space with the other Services in an effort to close the seams in Doctrine, Tactics, Techniques, and Procedures, and Command, Control, Communications, Computers, Intelligence, Surveillance and Reconnaissance."

Three riverine squadrons were active in the U.S. Navy, all under the command of Riverine Group 1, located in Norfolk, Virginia. Riverine Squadron 1 (RIVRON 1) deployed to Iraq in April 2007 and was relieved by Riverine Squadron 2 (RIVRON 2) in October 2007. Riverine Squadron 3 (RIVRON 3) was established in July 2007 and they relieved RIVRON 2 when their deployment was completed in April 2008. Also deployed to Iraq, but was in support of CJSOTF-AP and TF-77, was Combat Camera Group Pacific/Atlantic. This unit provided highly trained combat photographers who integrated with SEAL Teams and Special Forces Operational Detachment-Alpha (ODA) Teams in order to provide intelligence collection and combat documentation.

== Deployments in Autumn 2009-2010 ==
- 4th Brigade, 2nd Infantry Division
  - 4th Battalion, 9th Infantry Regiment
  - 2nd Battalion, 23rd Infantry Regiment
  - 1st Battalion, 38th Infantry Regiment
  - 2nd Squadron, 1st Cavalry Regiment (RSTA)
  - 2nd Battalion, 12th Field Artillery Regiment (2-12th FAR)
  - 702nd Brigade Support Battalion (702nd BSB)
  - Brigade Special Troops Battalion (BSTB)
- 3rd Infantry Division Headquarters
- 1st Infantry Division Headquarters
- 1st Armored Division Headquarters
- 1st Brigade Combat Team, 1st Armored Division
- 1st and 2nd Brigade Combat Teams, 10th Mountain Division
- 1st, 2nd and 3rd Brigade Combat Teams, 3rd Infantry Division
- 3rd Brigade Combat Team, 4th Infantry Division
- 53rd Brigade Combat Team, Florida Army National Guard
- 747th Military Police Company, Massachusetts Army National Guard
- 25th Combat Aviation Brigade, 25th Infantry Division

== Other countries contributing to MNF-I ==
=== United Kingdom ===
The British Armed Forces was the second-largest contributor of foreign troops to Iraq, behind the United States. The British Army commanded the former Multi-National Division (South-East) (Iraq), which included UK, Italian, Australian, Romanian, Danish, Portuguese, Czech, and Lithuanian troops. However, the UK turned over command to the United States on March 31, 2009, and were in the process of withdrawing the 4,100 UK personnel based in and around Basra, leaving behind just 400 by the end of July 2009. 20th Armoured Brigade commanded the British forces in Iraq, which were then attached the U.S.-led Multi-National Division South.

=== Australia ===
The Australian Defence Force had about 100 personnel providing security for the Australian Embassy in Baghdad. Known as Joint Task Force 633, it consisted mainly of infantry, cavalry, military police and combat service support personnel from the Darwin-based 5th Battalion, the Royal Australian Regiment and 2nd Cavalry Regiment. The ADF also had 45 personnel embedded in various coalition headquarters and contributes two officers to the United Nations Assistance Mission for Iraq (UNAMI).

=== Romania ===
The Romanian Armed Forces had one battalion deployed to Iraq. The 26th Infantry Battalion "Neagoe Basarab", also known as the Red Scorpions, based at Contingency Operating Base Adder, part of Tallil Air Base, near Nasiriyah, was attached to the 4th BCT, 1st Cavalry Division and performed convoy and infrastructure guard missions. The battalion was withdrawn from early June 2009.

== NATO Training Mission – Iraq ==
The NATO Training Mission – Iraq was not a combat mission but was focused on training and mentoring the Iraqi Armed Forces and the Iraqi Police. It was supported and funded by all 28 NATO nations, and 14 nations had staff in theater as of January 2009, including Bulgaria, Denmark, Estonia, Hungary, Italy, Lithuania, Netherlands, Poland, Romania, Slovenia, Turkey, the United Kingdom, and the United States. Ukraine participated alongside these nations, though it is not a member of NATO.

== See also ==
- Reconstruction of Iraq : the transitional period following the multinational forces invaded Iraq in March 2003.
- 2003 invasion of Iraq - the multinational force's entry into Iraq by force and the combat between the old Iraqi army and the Coalition forces.
  - Invasion of Iraq order of battle, 2003
- 2003 - 2004 occupation of Iraq timeline : Timeline of events during Multinational force's occupation of Iraq, following 2003 invasion of Iraq
- 2005 in Iraq: Events in Iraq during the year 2005.
- Casualties of the conflict in Iraq since 2003
- Iraqi insurgency : the armed campaign being waged by various irregular forces, both Iraqi and external in origin, against the multinational force and the new Iraqi government.
- Iraq Survey Group: A fact-finding mission sent by the coalition after the 2003 Invasion of Iraq to find weapons of mass destruction (WMD) programs developed by Iraq under the regime of former Iraqi President Saddam Hussein.
- Sectarian violence in Iraq : Events that could lead to an Iraqi civil war.
- 2008 Mosul offensive
