= 98th Regiment =

98th Regiment may refer to:

- 98th Regiment of Foot (disambiguation), various units of the British Army
- 98th Ahir Infantry, a unit of the British Indian Army
- 98th Cavalry Regiment, United States Army
- 98th Heavy Anti-Aircraft Regiment, Royal Artillery

== American Civil War regiments ==
- 98th Illinois Infantry Regiment
- 98th Indiana Infantry Regiment
- 98th New York Infantry Regiment
- 98th Ohio Infantry Regiment
- 98th Pennsylvania Infantry Regiment

== See also ==
- 98th Brigade (disambiguation)
- 98th Division (disambiguation)
- 98 Squadron (disambiguation)
