= 155th Armored Brigade Combat Team =

- 155th ABCT Shoulder Sleeve Insignia
- Active: 15 March 1951–15 February 1968 (various designations 108th Armored Cavalry); 15 February 1968–1 November 1973 (1st Bge., 30th Armored Div.); 1 November 1973–July 2006 (155th Armored Bge.); July 2006–present (155th ABCT)
- Country: United States
- Allegiance: Mississippi Army National Guard
- Branch: United States Army National Guard
- Type: Armored Brigade Combat Team
- Size: Brigade
- Part of: 36th Infantry Division
- Garrison/HQ: Columbia National Guard Armory, Columbia, Miss.
- Motto: "Dixie Thunder!"
- Website: https://www.ng.ms.gov/units/155abct

Commanders
- Current commander: Colonel Christopher Jurney
- Command Sergeant Major: Dwight Brown

Insignia
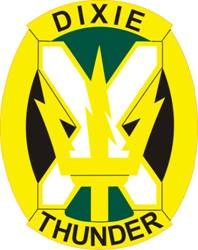
- Distinctive unit insignia

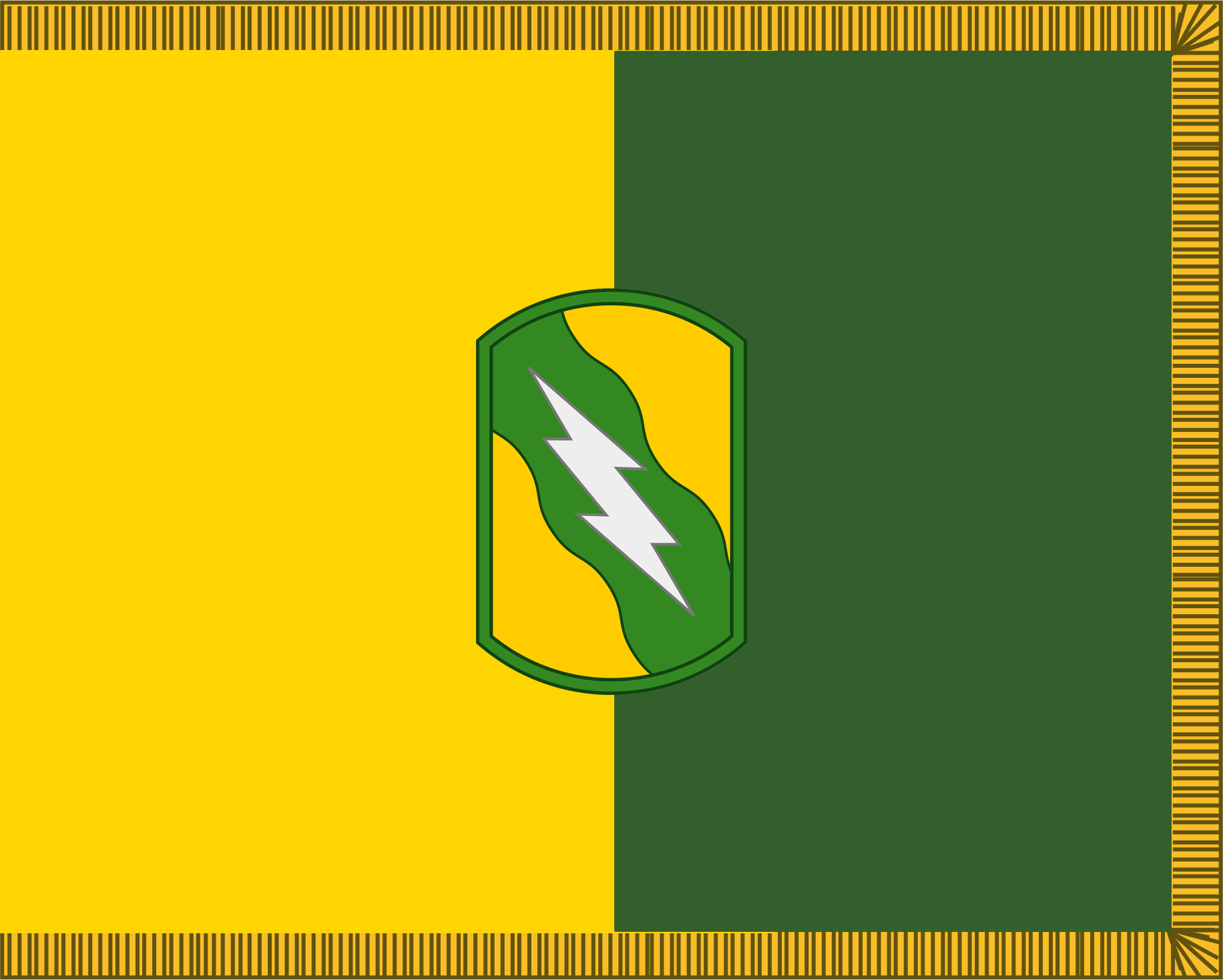
- 155th Armored Brigade Combat Team

Air Assault School—slingload training (1:02)
The 155th ABCT conduct slingload training as part of phase 2 of Air Assault School at Camp Buehring, Kuwait

The 155th Armored Brigade Combat Team (155th ABCT) is a brigade combat team of the Mississippi Army National Guard.

The brigade was formed in 1973 as the separate 155th Armored Brigade from the 1st Brigade, 30th Armored Division during a National Guard reorganization. It became the 155th Armored Brigade Combat Team following the 2006 United States Army reorganization into modular brigade combat teams.

== History ==
=== Origins ===
While the units assigned to the 155th ABCT vary in seniority, the brigade itself traces its lineage to 16 March 1951 when it was constituted in the Mississippi Army National Guard as the Headquarters and Headquarters Company (HHC) of the 108th Armored Cavalry Group, before being organized and federally recognized on 12 April 1951, based in Columbia. On 1 November 1953 the group was redesignated as the 108th Armor Group. The group was combined with the 750th Tank Battalion and newly organized units to form the 108th Armored Cavalry on 1 November 1955; the HHC of the group became the Headquarters Company of the 108th Armored Cavalry. On 1 May 1959 the company was redesignated as a troop. In order to restore order during the Ole Miss riot of 1962, the company, alongside the Mississippi National Guard, were ordered into active federal service on 30 September of that year, being released from active federal service on 23 October and reverting to state control.

On 15 February 1968, the company was reorganized and redesignated as the HHC of the 1st Brigade, 30th Armored Division.

=== Formation and subsequent history ===
The brigade became the 155th Armored Brigade on 1 November 1973 when the 30th Armored was split up into separate brigades. 30th Armored assistant commander Brigadier General Guy J. Gravelee Jr. became the first 155th commander, and it took the number of the 155th Infantry Regiment, the oldest Mississippi National Guard unit, which traced its lineage back to 1798. It consisted of the 1st Battalion, 155th Infantry Regiment, the 1st and 2nd Battalions of the 198th Armored Regiment, the 2nd Battalion, 114th Field Artillery Regiment, Troop A, 98th Cavalry (the former Troop C, 1st Squadron, 230th Cavalry), and the 106th Support Battalion.

The 155th Armored Brigade was mobilized for the Gulf War on 7 December 1990, but remained stateside and was demobilized on 14 May 1991. The 155th Armored Brigade became an Enhanced Separate Brigade in 1993 to provide a flexible reinforcement to active Army units during wartime. The Enhanced Separate Brigades receive specialized training and higher priority than other National Guard units for personnel, equipment and other resources during peacetime. Organized as a powerful independent striking force, the brigade consisted of two armor battalions, a mechanized infantry battalion, a field artillery battalion, an engineer battalion, and a support battalion along with an armored cavalry troop, an air defense battery, and a military intelligence company. Given these units, the Brigade was well postured to conduct offensive and defensive combat operations.

The brigade deployed to Iraq in support of Operation Iraqi Freedom III from August 2004 to January 2006. During this tour of duty, the 155th HBCT suffered 15 fatalities. The brigade served under the II Marine Expeditionary Force. After its return from Iraq the brigade began its conversion into a modular heavy brigade combat team.

In 2009, the brigade was deployed again to Iraq in support of Operation Iraqi Freedom 9.2. In March 2018, the 155th left for a three-month training period at Fort Bliss with the 177th Armored Brigade, prior to a nine-month deployment to support Operation Spartan Shield from Camp Buehring in Kuwait. The 155th relieved the 2nd Brigade Combat Team, 1st Armored Division there on 15 July, the first National Guard armored brigade combat team to deploy for Operation Spartan Shield. While the brigade remained headquartered at Camp Buehring, elements of the brigade were deployed to Syria as part of Operation Inherent Resolve by November, according to an article in The New Yorker.

== Organization 2025 ==
155th Armored Brigade Combat Team in Fort Irwin National Training Center.

- 155th Armored Brigade Combat Team, in Columbia
  - Headquarters and Headquarters Company, 1st Armored Brigade Combat Team, 34th Infantry Division, in Columbia
  - 1st Squadron, 98th Cavalry Regiment, in Amory
    - Headquarters and Headquarters Troop, 1st Squadron, 98th Cavalry Regiment, in Amory
    - Troop A, 1st Squadron, 98th Cavalry Regiment, in Pontotoc
    - Troop B, 1st Squadron, 98th Cavalry Regiment, in Booneville
    - Troop C, 1st Squadron, 98th Cavalry Regiment, in Fulton
      - Detachment 1, Troop C, 1st Squadron, 98th Cavalry Regiment, in Iuka
    - Troop D (Tank), 1st Squadron, 98th Cavalry Regiment, in Indianola
  - 1st Battalion, 155th Infantry Regiment, in McComb
    - Headquarters and Headquarters Company, 1st Battalion, 155th Infantry Regiment, in McComb
      - Detachment 1, Headquarters and Headquarters Company, 1st Battalion, 155th Infantry Regiment, in Tylertown
    - Company A (Mechanized Infantry), 1st Battalion, 155th Infantry Regiment, in Biloxi
    - Company B (Mechanized Infantry), 1st Battalion, 155th Infantry Regiment, in Poplarville
    - Company C (Tank), 1st Battalion, 155th Infantry Regiment, in Kiln
  - 2nd Battalion, 198th Armor Regiment, in Senatobia
    - Headquarters and Headquarters Company, 2nd Battalion, 198th Armor Regiment, in Senatobia
      - Detachment 1, Headquarters and Headquarters Company, 2nd Battalion, 198th Armor Regiment, in Batesville
    - Company A (Tank), 2nd Battalion, 198th Armor Regiment, in Hernando
      - Detachment 1, Company A (Tank), 2nd Battalion, 198th Armor Regiment, in Holly Springs
    - Company B (Tank), 2nd Battalion, 198th Armor Regiment, in Greenwood
      - Detachment 1, Company B (Tank), 2nd Battalion, 198th Armor Regiment, in Drew
    - Company C (Mechanized Infantry), 2nd Battalion, 198th Armor Regiment, in Oxford
  - 1st Battalion, 635th Armor Regiment, in Kansas City (KS) (Kansas Army National Guard)
    - Headquarters and Headquarters Company, 1st Battalion, 635th Armor Regiment, in Kansas City (KS)
      - Detachment 1, Headquarters and Headquarters Company, 1st Battalion, 635th Armor Regiment, in Junction City (KS)
    - Company A (Tank), 1st Battalion, 635th Armor Regiment, in Emporia (KS)
    - Company B (Tank), 1st Battalion, 635th Armor Regiment, in Lawrence (KS)
    - Company C (Mechanized Infantry), 1st Battalion, 635th Armor Regiment, in Wichita (KS)
      - Detachment 1, Company C (Mechanized Infantry), 1st Battalion, 635th Armor Regiment, in Lawrence (KS)
  - 2nd Battalion, 114th Field Artillery Regiment, in Starkville
    - Headquarters and Headquarters Battery, 2nd Battalion, 114th Field Artillery Regiment, in Starkville
    - Battery A, 2nd Battalion, 114th Field Artillery Regiment, in Columbus
      - Detachment 1, Battery A, 2nd Battalion, 114th Field Artillery Regiment, in Ackerman
    - Battery B, 2nd Battalion, 114th Field Artillery Regiment, in Kosciusko
      - Detachment 1, Battery A, 2nd Battalion, 114th Field Artillery Regiment, in Winona
    - Battery C, 2nd Battalion, 114th Field Artillery Regiment, in Starkville
  - 150th Brigade Engineer Battalion, in Meridian
    - Headquarters and Headquarters Company, 150th Brigade Engineer Battalion, in Meridian
      - Detachment 1, Headquarters and Headquarters Company, 150th Brigade Engineer Battalion, in Carthage
      - Detachment 2, Headquarters and Headquarters Company, 150th Brigade Engineer Battalion, in Quitman
    - Company A (Combat Engineer), 150th Brigade Engineer Battalion, in Canton
    - Company B (Engineer Support), 150th Brigade Engineer Battalion, in Lucedale
    - Company C (Signal), 150th Brigade Engineer Battalion, in Columbia
    - Company D (Military Intelligence), 150th Brigade Engineer Battalion, in Canton
      - Detachment 1, Company D (Military Intelligence), 150th Brigade Engineer Battalion, at Camp Shelby (RQ-28A UAV)
  - 106th Brigade Support Battalion, in Hattiesburg
    - Headquarters and Headquarters Company, 106th Brigade Support Battalion, in Hattiesburg
    - Company A (Distribution), 106th Brigade Support Battalion, in Magee
      - Detachment 1, Company A (Distribution), 106th Brigade Support Battalion, in Taylorsville
      - Detachment 2, Company A (Distribution), 106th Brigade Support Battalion, in Prentiss
    - Company B (Maintenance), 106th Brigade Support Battalion, in Laurel
    - Company C (Medical), 106th Brigade Support Battalion, in Crystal Springs
    - Company D (Forward Support), 106th Brigade Support Battalion, in Corinth — attached to 1st Squadron, 98th Cavalry Regiment
      - Detachment 1, Company D (Forward Support), 106th Brigade Support Battalion, in Gloster
      - Detachment 2, Company D (Forward Support), 106th Brigade Support Battalion, in Collins
    - Company E (Forward Support), 106th Brigade Support Battalion, in Brookhaven — attached to 150th Brigade Engineer Battalion
    - Company F (Forward Support), 106th Brigade Support Battalion, in Louisville — attached to 2nd Battalion, 114th Field Artillery Regiment
      - Detachment 1, Company F (Forward Support), 106th Brigade Support Battalion, in Eupora
    - Company G (Forward Support), 106th Brigade Support Battalion, in Manhattan (KS) — attached to 1st Battalion, 635th Armor Regiment (Kansas Army National Guard)
      - Detachment 1, Company G (Forward Support), 106th Brigade Support Battalion, in Kansas City (KS)
    - Company H (Forward Support), 106th Brigade Support Battalion, in Grenada — attached to 2nd Battalion, 198th Armor Regiment
      - Detachment 1, Company H (Forward Support), 106th Brigade Support Battalion, in Charleston
      - Detachment 2, Company H (Forward Support), 106th Brigade Support Battalion, in Cleveland
    - Company I (Forward Support), 106th Brigade Support Battalion, in Brookhaven — attached to 1st Battalion, 155th Infantry Regiment

== Unit coats of arms ==
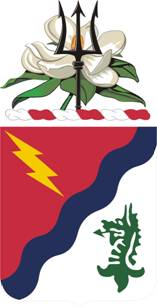
- 98th Cavalry Regiment
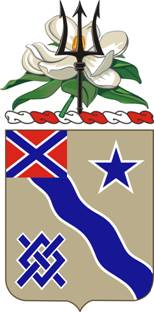
- 106th Brigade Support Battalion
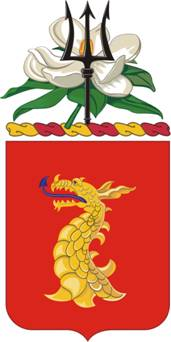
- 114th Field Artillery Regiment
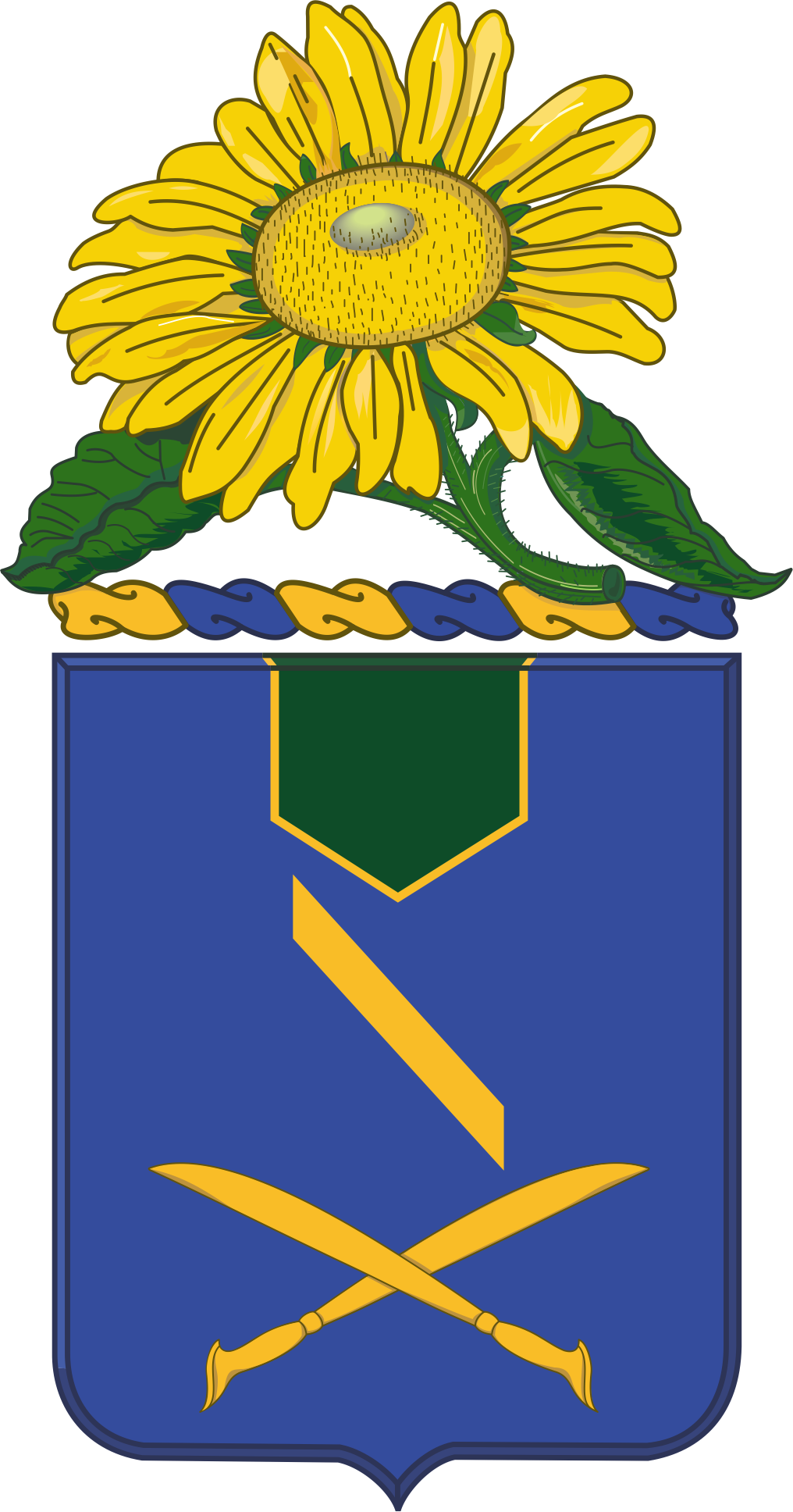
- 137th Infantry Regiment
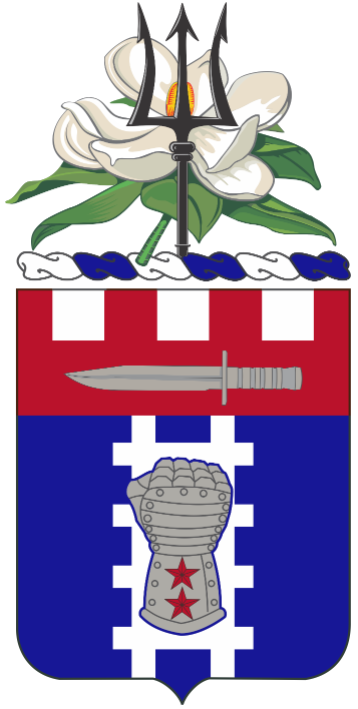
- 150th Engineer Battalion
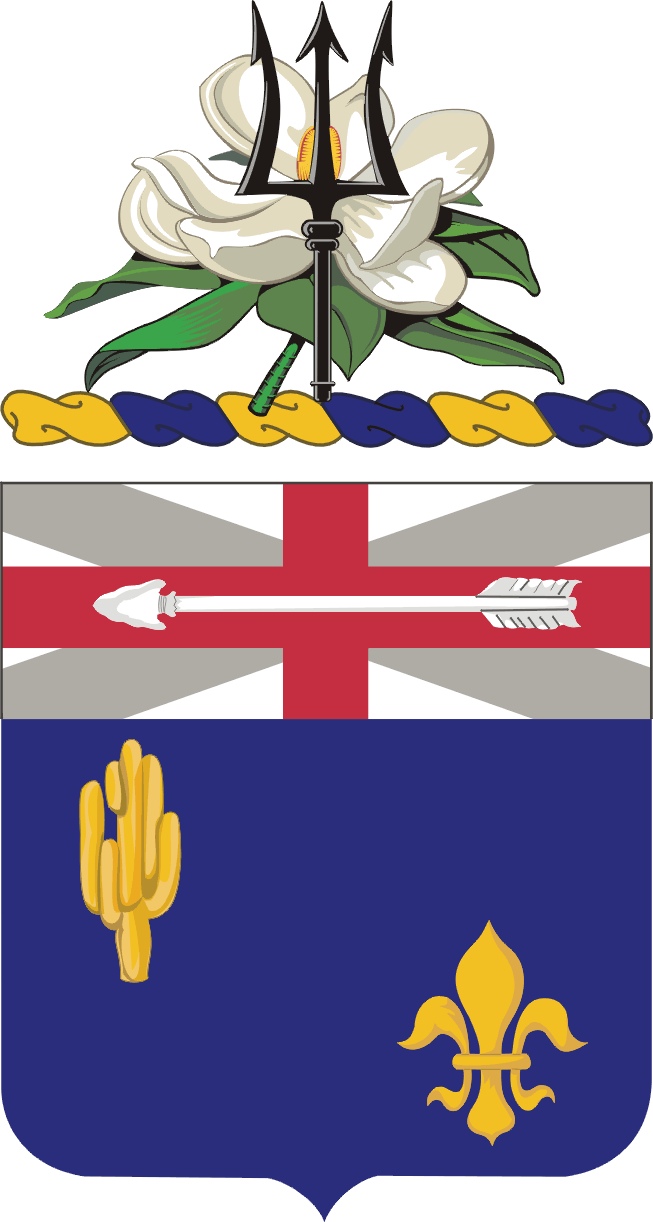
- 155th Infantry Regiment
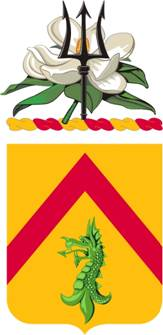
- 198th Armored Regiment

== See also ==
- 36th Infantry Division (United States)
- Armored Brigade Combat Team
- Camp Shelby
- FOB Dogwood
- FOB Duke
- FOB Iskandariyah
- FOB Kalsu
- Iraq War order of battle
