= Mississippi Army National Guard =

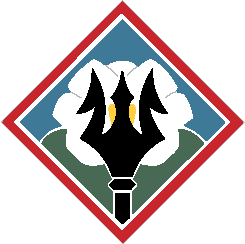
- Seal of the Mississippi National Guard
- Active: 1798–present
- Country: United States
- Branch: United States Army
- Role: United States Army National Guard
- Size: c.10,000 (Globalsecurity.org)
- Part of: Mississippi National Guard
- Garrison/HQ: Jackson, Mississippi

Commanders
- Adjutant General of Mississippi: MG Bobby M. Ginn, Jr.

Insignia
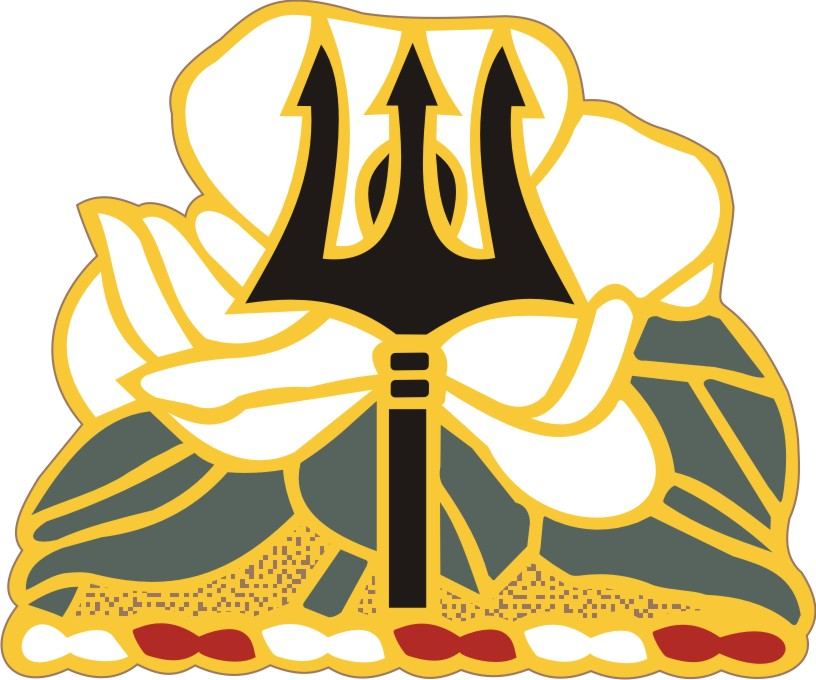
- Mississippi ARNG Headquarters DUI

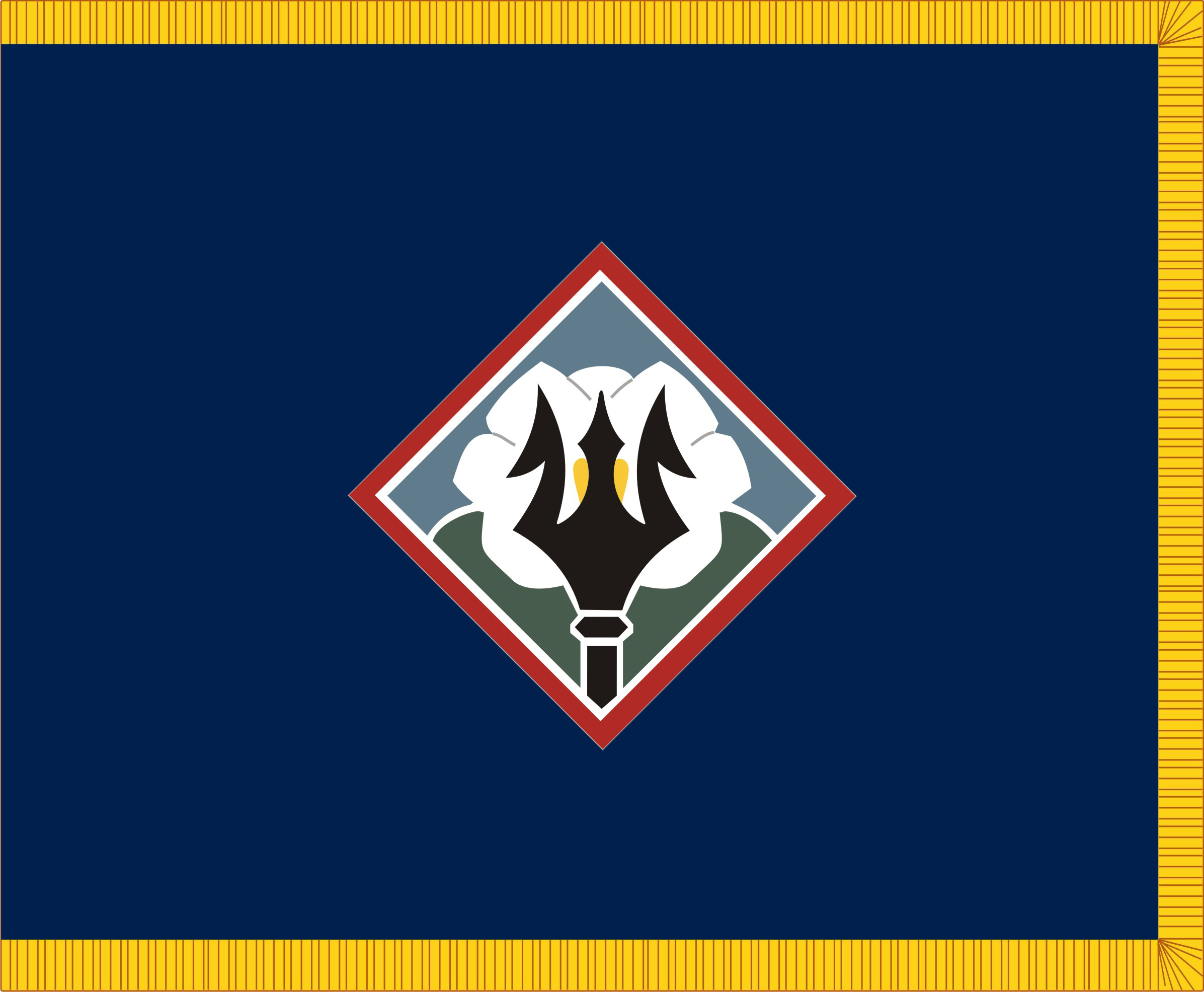
- Mississippi ARNG Headquarters Flag

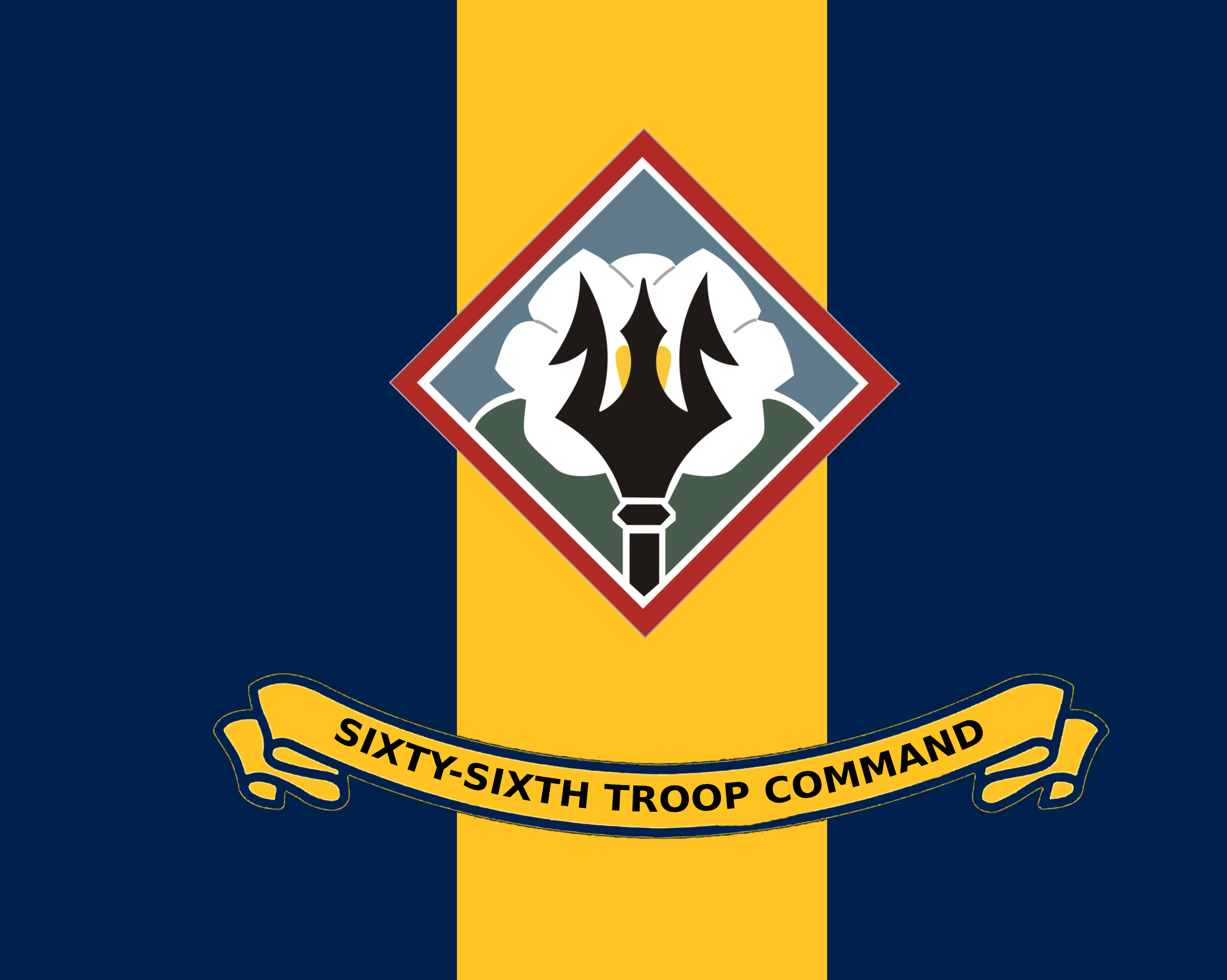
- Mississippi Army National Guard 66th Troop Command Flag

The Mississippi Army National Guard is the Army National Guard component of the Mississippi National Guard. It was originally formed in 1798. It is a component of the United States Army and the National Guard. It is managed by the Mississippi Military Department.

The Mississippi Army National Guard maintains 97 armories in 93 communities. Mississippi Army National Guard units are trained and equipped as part of the United States Army. The same ranks and insignia are used and National Guardsmen are eligible to receive all United States military awards. The Mississippi Guard also bestows a number of state awards for local services rendered in or to the state of Mississippi.

== History ==
On 8 September 1798 Winthrop Sargent, the first governor of the Mississippi Territory issued an order organizing the Militia of the Territory. On 28 February 1799, Governor Sargent was able to get his legislative body together and the first law was passed for the permanent establishment of the Militia in Mississippi. This law constituted the beginning of the lineage of the 155th Infantry Regiment in Mississippi.

The 155th Infantry Regiment is one of only nineteen Army National Guard units with campaign credit for the War of 1812, and the only one from west of the Appalachians.

Through the years the laws governing the Militia changed in various ways. Establishment of units varied from year to year, and ways of obtaining strength for the units also varied. There were periods of lack and little Militia at all. At other times the Militia forces were well organized.

Although the Mississippi Militia participated in every war and fight of any consequence from the Sabine Expedition of 1806 through the Korean War in 1953, it was not until 1916 the Mississippi National Guard was called for active duty. In 1916 the War Department called three infantry battalions for service on the Mexican Border. These battalions formed the First Infantry Regiment which went on active duty on 24 June 1916. In September 1917 this unit was redesignated the 155th Infantry Regiment and served in the 39th Division in France. Also created during World War I, largely from Arkansas Army National Guard units, was the 154th Infantry Regiment, which continued its service after the war with the Mississippi Army National Guard.

Again in 1940 all units of the Mississippi National Guard were inducted into Federal service. Between 1950 and 1951, 77 of 81 units were called into service during the Korean War. A total of 6,515 Mississippi Guardsmen served during this period.

From 1959, "the Army Aviation program began the concept of operating as a separate company instead of assigning two aviators, two aircraft and one mechanic to each unit. Mississippi reorganized into parts of two companies within the 31st Division in Jackson, the 108th Aviation Company in Tupelo, and the 123rd Aviation Company [123rd Air Ambulance Medical Aviation Company?] and the 1066th Transportation Aircraft Maintenance Company in Meridian. Full time maintenance support facilities were organized at Tupelo and Meridian, in addition to the one at Jackson. The 123rd Aviation Company in Meridian was called to active duty during 1961-62 as part of the Berlin crisis _ All National Guard units in the state were federalized for several days during an integration uprising at Ole Miss. In 1963 the Mississippi part of the 3lst Aviation Company became a full sized company."

Around the early 1960s, the Mississippi Army National Guard had 151 units located throughout the State. Fifty-one of these units were part of the 31st (Dixie) Division and the remainder were non-divisional units.

"While the process of restructuring and organizing the additional maintenance support facilities in Tupelo and Meridian was going on, all Mississippi National Guard units were placed on active duty on September 30, 1962, by President John Kennedy. The call-up was to remove the Guard units from state control when the Federal Government took over the effort to enroll James Meredith as the first black at the University of Mississippi in Oxford."

"No sooner was the "Ole Miss crisis" over when another crisis developed. Five days after most units were released from the Ole Miss federalization, Adjutant General William Wilson issued a call to Guard troops for state duty in Natchez. The mission was to devise and operate a warning system to all residents within a 25-mile semicircle east of the Mississippi river near Natchez where the Corps of Engineers would be attempting to remove four sunken barges containing nearly two and one-half million pounds of chlorine gas liquified by pressure. The aviation mission was part of an overall plan to evacuate about 80,000 residents of the area in event there were gas leaks during the removal of the tanks."

Among units formed within the Mississippi Army National Guard since World War II are the 108th Armored Cavalry Regiment, the 198th Armor Regiment, the 114th Field Artillery Regiment, the 185th Aviation Regiment, and the 204th Air Defense Artillery Regiment. The 198th Armor Regiment was constituted on 28 April 1959, and organized from 1 May-15 September 1959.

For much of the final decades of the twentieth century, National Guard personnel typically served "One weekend a month, two weeks a year", with a portion working for the Guard in a full-time capacity. Circa 2011 plans called for the typical National Guard unit (or National Guardsman) to serve one year of active duty for every three years of service. More specifically, current Department of Defense policy is that no Guardsman will be involuntarily activated for a total of more than 24 months (cumulative) in one six-year enlistment period (this policy is due to change 1 August 2007, the new policy states that soldiers will be given 24 months between deployments of no more than 24 months, individual states have differing policies).

The 1st Battalion, 198th Armor Regiment (HQ Senatobia) used to serve as part of the 155th Armoured Brigade, but was disbanded as part of the c.2010 modular ('Army Transformation') reorganization.

== Structure ==
In 2016, the Mississippi Army National Guard included the following units:

- Joint Forces Headquarters
  - 154th Regiment (Regional Training Institute)
    - 1st Battalion (Armor)
    - 2nd Battalion (Infantry)
    - 3rd Battalion (Non Commissioned Officers Academy)
    - 4th Battalion (Medical)
  - 972nd JAG Detachment
  - Detachment 16, Operational Support Airlift Command (OSA)
- 155th Armored Brigade Combat Team (HQ Tupelo)
  - 1st Squadron, 98th Cavalry Regiment (HQ Amory)
  - 1st Battalion, 155th Infantry Regiment (HQ McComb)
  - 2nd Battalion, 198th Armor Regiment (HQ Senatobia)
  - 2nd Battalion, 114th Field Artillery Regiment (HQ Starkville)
  - 106th Brigade Support Battalion (HQ Hattiesburg)
  - 150th Brigade Engineer Battalion (HQ Meridian)
- 184th Sustainment Command (HQ Laurel)
  - 168th Engineer Brigade
    - 223rd Engineer Battalion
    - 890th Engineer Battalion
  - 298th Support Battalion
    - 367th Maintenance Company
    - 3656th Maintenance Company
    - 1387th Quartermaster Company (Water)
    - 1687th Transportation Company (Medium Truck)
  - 31st Support Detachment (Rear Operations Center)
  - 114th Support Detachment (Army Liaison Team)
- 66th Troop Command
  - 185th Aviation Brigade
  - 2nd Battalion, 20th Special Forces Group
  - Army National Guard Special Operations Detachment South (HQ Jackson)
  - 47th Civil Support Team (HQ Flowood)
  - 102d Public Affairs Detachment
  - 41st Army Band
  - 1st Battalion, 204th Air Defense Artillery Regiment

== See also ==
- Mississippi State Guard
