= 98 =

98 may refer to:

- one of the years 98 BC, AD 98, 1998, 2098
- 98 (number), the natural number following 97 and preceding 99
- Windows 98, a 1998 operating system made by Microsoft
- 98 Ianthe, a main-belt asteroid
- Oldsmobile 98, a full-sized luxury car

== See also ==
- 98th (disambiguation)
- Californium (atomic number), a chemical element
- 98 Degrees (98°), a band
