= 114th Field Artillery Regiment =

Field artillery regiment of the Mississippi Army National Guard

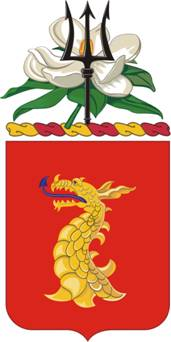
- Coat of arms
- Country: (United States)
- Branch: United States Army
- Type: Field artillery
- Role: USARS parent regiment
- Size: regiment

Insignia
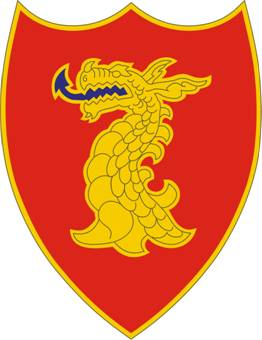
- Distinctive unit insignia

- Shoulder Sleeve Insignia of the 155th Armored Brigade Combat Team

The 114th Field Artillery Regiment is a field artillery regiment of the Mississippi Army National Guard. The regiment's 2nd Battalion is the cannon battalion assigned to the 155th Armored Brigade Combat Team.

== Lineage and honors ==
=== Lineage ===
- Organized in April 1917 in the Mississippi National Guard as the 1st Field Artillery with headquarters at Jackson.
- Drafted into Federal service 5 August 1917.
- Reorganized and redesignated 27 September 1917 as the 140th Field Artillery and assigned to the 39th Division.
- Demobilized 1 May 1919 at Camp Shelby, Mississippi.
- Reorganized and Federally recognized 20 May 1926 in the Mississippi National Guard as the 1st Battalion, 178th Field Artillery, an element of the 31st Division, with headquarters at Greenville.
- Redesignated 15 November 1932 as the 1st Battalion, 114th Field Artillery, an element of the 31st Division.
- Expanded, reorganized, and redesignated 20 May 1933 as the 114th Field Artillery with headquarters at Greenville.
- Inducted into Federal service 25 November 1940 at home stations.
- Redesignated (less 1st Battalion) 26 February 1942 as the 137th Field Artillery (less 2d Battalion) and relieved from assignment to the 31st Division; 1st Battalion, 114th Field Artillery, concurrently reorganized and redesignated as the 114th Field Artillery Battalion, an element of the 31st Infantry Division.
- Headquarters and Headquarters Battery, 137th Field Artillery, reorganized and redesignated 24 February 1943 as Headquarters and Headquarters Battery, 137th Field Artillery Group.
- Inactivated 9 October 1943 at Camp Cooke, California.
- Consolidated 30 December 1946 with the 114th Field Artillery Battalion (inactivated 21 December 1945 at Camp Stoneman, California) and consolidated unit reorganized and Federally recognized in west central Mississippi as the 114th Field Artillery Battalion, an element of the 31st Infantry Division, with headquarters at Greenville.

(Location of headquarters changed 1 January 1949 to Greenwood.)

- Ordered into active Federal service 16 January 1951 at home stations.

(114th Field Artillery Battalion [NGUS] organized and Federally recognized 18 February 1953 with headquarters at Greenwood.)

- Released 15 June 1954 from active Federal service and reverted to state control; Federal recognition concurrently withdrawn from the 114th Field Artillery Battalion (NGUS).
- 1st Battalion, 137th Field Artillery, reorganized and redesignated 8 February 1943 as the 932d Field Artillery Battalion.
- Inactivated 10 December 1945 at Camp Patrick Henry, Virginia.
- Reorganized and expanded to form the 932d Field Artillery Battalion (organized in east central Mississippi and Federally recognized 17 December 1946 with headquarters at Starkville), an element of the 31st Infantry Division, and the 631st Field Artillery Battalion (see below).
- 932d Field Artillery Battalion ordered into active Federal service 16 February 1951 at home stations.

(932d Field Artillery Battalion [NGUS] organized and Federally recognized 22 January 1953 with headquarters at Starkville.) * Released 15 June 1954 from active Federal service and reverted to state control; Federal recognition concurrently withdrawn from the 932d Field Artillery Battalion (NGUS).

- 631st Field Artillery Battalion organized in southern Mississippi and Federally recognized 10 April 1947 with headquarters at Hattiesburg.
- Reorganized and redesignated 1 September 1949 as the 631st Armored Field Artillery Battalion.
- Ordered into active Federal service 9 September 1950 at home stations.

(631st Armored Field Artillery Battalion [NGUS] organized and Federally recognized 9 November 1952 with headquarters at Hattiesburg.)

- Released 17 December 1954 from active Federal service and reverted to state control; Federal recognition concurrently withdrawn from the 631st Armored Field Artillery Battalion (NGUS).
- 114th and 932d Field Artillery Battalions and the 631st Armored Field Artillery Battalion consolidated 1 May 1959 with the 234th Field Artillery Battalion (organized and Federally recognized 12 November 1952 in central Mississippi with headquarters at Grenada) and the 415th Field Artillery Battalion (see ANNEX) to form the 114th Artillery, a parent regiment under the Combat Arms Regimental System, to consist of the 1st and 2d Howitzer Battalions, elements of the 31st Infantry Division, the 3d Rocket Howitzer Battalion, an element of the 31st Infantry Division, and the 4th and 5th Howitzer Battalions.

(1st, 2d, 4th, and 5th Howitzer Battalions and the 3d Rocket Howitzer Battalion ordered into active Federal service 30 September 1962 at home stations; 4th and 5th Howitzer Battalions released 5 October 1962 from active Federal service and reverted to state control; 1st and 2d Howitzer Battalions and 3d Rocket Howitzer Battalion released 9 October 1962 from active Federal service and reverted to state control.)

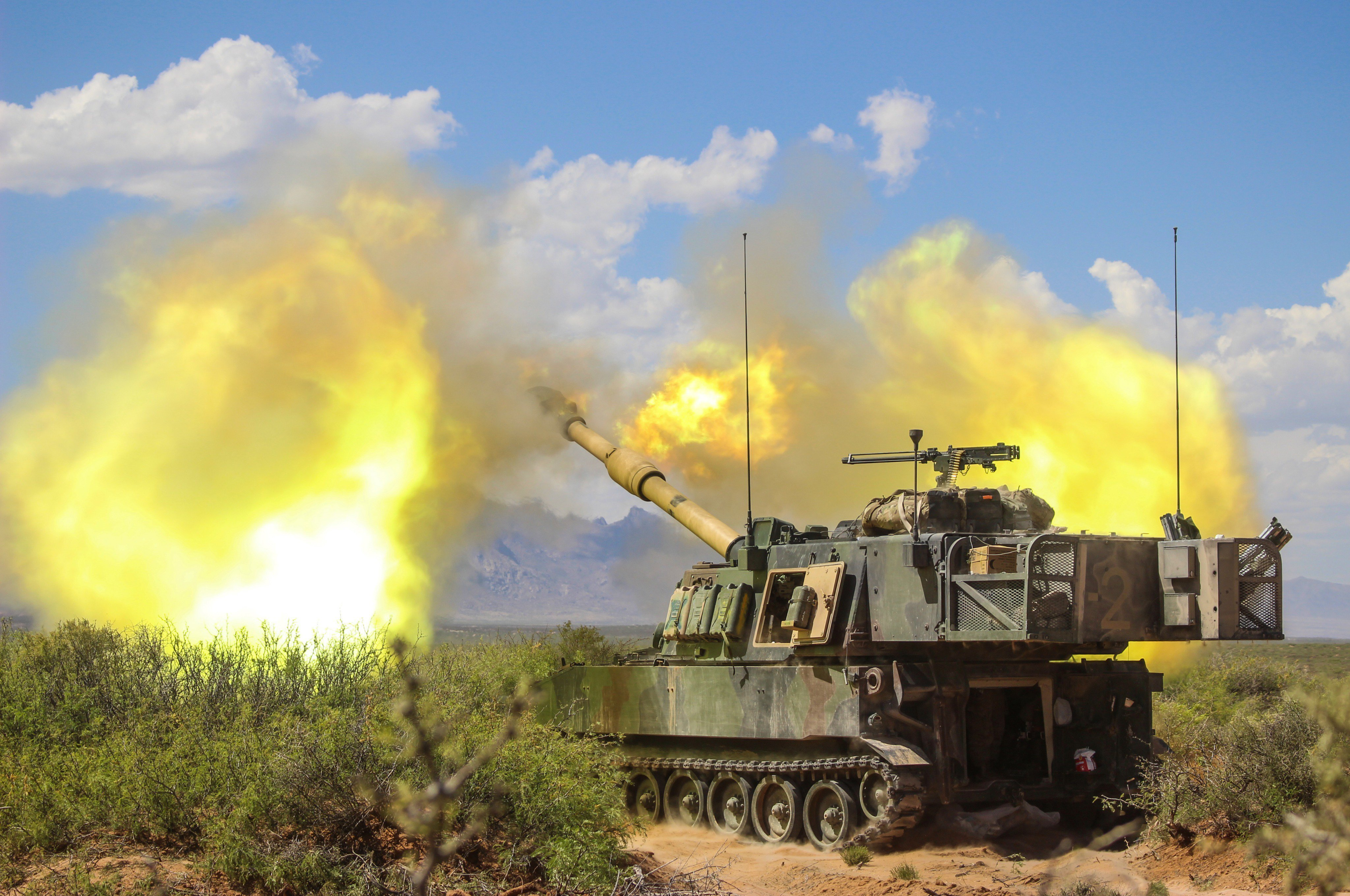
Battery B, 2d Battalion 114th Field Artillery Regiment at a training exercise in 2018

- Reorganized 1 May 1963 to consist of the 1st, 2d, and 3d Howitzer Battalions, elements of the 31st Infantry Division, and the 4th and 5th Howitzer Battalions.
- Reorganized 15 September 1968 to consist of the 1st and 4th Battalions and the 2d Battalion, an element of the 30th Armored Division.
- Redesignated 1 May 1972 as the 114th Field Artillery.
- Reorganized 1 November 1973 to consist of the 1st and 4th Battalions and the 2d Battalion, an element of the 155th Armored Brigade.
- Withdrawn 1 June 1989 from the Combat Arms Regimental System and reorganized under the United States Army Regimental System.

(2d Battalion ordered into active Federal service 7 December 1990 at home stations; released 30 April 1991 from active Federal service and reverted to state control.)

- Reorganized 1 September 1994 to consist of the 1st Battalion and the 2d Battalion, an element of the 155th Armored Brigade.

ANNEX
- Organized and Federally recognized 16 January 1956 in the Mississippi Army National Guard as the 154th Infantry Battalion with headquarters at Newton.
- Converted and redesignated 1 March 1956 as the 415th Field Artillery Battalion.

=== Campaign participation credit ===
- World War I: Streamer without inscription
- World War II: New Guinea; Southern Philippines; Naples-Foggia; Rome-Arno; Rhineland; Ardennes-Alsace; Central Europe

=== Decorations ===
- Philippine Presidential Unit Citation, Streamer embroidered 17 OCTOBER 1944 TO 4 JULY 1950 (114th Field Artillery Battalion cited; DA GO 47, 1950)

Battery A (Drew), 1st Battalion, additionally entitled to:
- Presidential Unit Citation (Army), Streamer embroidered MINDANAO (106th Engineer Combat Battalion cited; WD GO 81, 1946)

== Heraldry ==
=== Distinctive unit insignia ===
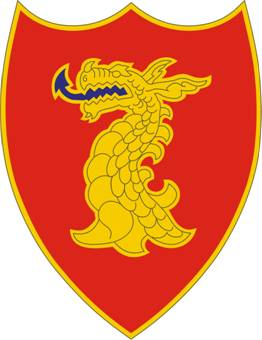

=== Coat of arms ===
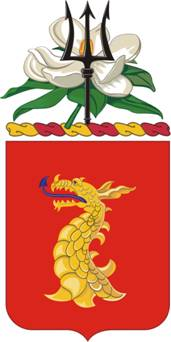

== See also ==
- Field Artillery Branch (United States)
- Army National Guard
- National Guard of the United States
