= Multi-National Division – Baghdad =

Military division in Iraq, 2003–2009

Multi-National Division – Baghdad (MND-B) was a division of Multi-National Force – Iraq during the Iraq War, responsible for controlling brigades in greater Baghdad that were responsible for areas within the city itself. It was headquartered by the 1st Cavalry Division and based at Camp Victory in Baghdad, Iraq, north of Baghdad International Airport. The brigades controlled by the 1st Cavalry Division included ones north of the city at Taji, in the northeastern part in Adhamiya, at Camp Liberty in the west, in the Green Zone, on the southern outskirts, and in the southeast near Rasheed Airfield.

Following the Iraq War troop surge of 2007, most of the brigades' troops were dispersed at battalion- and company-level combat outposts and joint security stations. The headquarters of MND-B was previously provided by HQ 1st Armored Division (2003–2004), HQ 1st Cavalry Division (2004–2005), HQ 3rd Infantry Division (2005), 4th Infantry Division (2006 & 2008–2009) and 1st Cavalry Division (2007).

== See also ==
- Iraq War order of battle 2009
