= 98th Brigade =

98th Brigade may refer to:

== Bangladesh ==
- 98th Composite Brigade

== British India ==
- 98th Indian Infantry Brigade

== Serbia ==
- 98th Air Brigade

== Spain ==
- 98th Mixed Brigade

== United Kingdom ==
- 98th Brigade (United Kingdom)
- 98th Brigade, Royal Field Artillery, a British Army unit during World War I
- 98th (Surrey and Sussex Yeomanry) Brigade, Royal Field Artillery, a British Army unit after World War I

== See also ==
- 98th Division (disambiguation)
- 98th Regiment (disambiguation)
