= 98th Division =

98th Division may refer to:

- 98th Division (2nd Formation) (People's Republic of China)
- 98th Infantry Division (Wehrmacht), Germany
- 98th Paratroopers Division, Israel
- 98th Guards Airborne Division, Russia/Soviet Union, previously the 98th Guards Rifle Division
- 98th Rifle Division, Red Army, Soviet Union
- 98th Division (United States)

== See also ==
- List of military divisions by number
- 98th Brigade (disambiguation)
- 98th Regiment (disambiguation)
- 98th Squadron (disambiguation)
