= 98th Division (2nd Formation) (People's Republic of China) =

98th Division (1950-52)
- Active: 1950.10 - 1952.5
- Country: (China)
- Type: Infantry
- Size: Division
- Part of: Shandong Military Region
- Garrison/HQ: Xuzhou, Jiangsu

The 99th Division (Chinese: 第99师)(2nd Formation) was formed in October 1950 basing on the 2nd Security Brigade of Huadong Military Region.

In May 1952 the division was inactivated and reorganized as 2nd Irrigation Works Construction Division(Chinese: 水利工程建设第2师).
