= Forward Operating Base Duke =

Forward Operating Base Duke is a base of the Iraqi Armed Forces located 20 km northwest of Najaf, Iraq.

== History ==
In mid-April 2004 2nd Armored Cavalry Regiment, an element of Task Force 1st Armored Division. The "Dragoons" assumed control of the former Iraqi army ammunition depot from the 1st Infantry Division's 3rd Brigade, which moved north for another mission. The FOB was named for the 3rd Brigade known as the "Dukes".

FOB Duke was only a temporary staging area until forces can move to another base closer to the city. Elements of the regiment soon began moving out.

The 11th Marine Expeditionary Unit assumed operational control of Forward Operating Base Duke July 31, 2004.

Later, the 155th Brigade Combat Team of the Mississippi National Guard, supported by a multi-state National Guard Unit containing elements from the Utah, Montana and Missouri National Guard, (combined unit 115th GS Co. - UTANAMO) assumed command and was visited by Mississippi Governor Haley Barbour in November 2005. It was later occupied by units assigned to the 2nd Brigade Combat Team (BCT), 4th Infantry Division from Fort Hood, TX during OIF rotation 05-07 from December 2005 to December 2006.

The 3rd Battalion, 16th Field Artillery Regiment (3/16 FA) and the 204th Brigade Support Battalion (204th BSB) supported brigade combat operations in the An-Najaf and Babil provinces. The units sent M1114 Gun Trucks on Reconnaissance & Security (R&S) patrols outside the FOB. The patrols checked on all noticeable areas of interest (NAIs) outside the base and established observation posts (OPs) to detect suspicious persons, vehicles or activity near the FOB. Unauthorized persons, vehicles and/or activities presented a threat to the FOB and resupply convoys. They also made sure the protective concertina wire around the FOB was intact. They also had a “cop on the beat” role, monitoring local Bedouins and ensured that only authorized persons were present at landfill sites near the FOB. During daily R&S patrols, the Soldiers occasionally discovered Iraqi civilians exploring the bunkers outside the FOB for usable items that had been discarded or abandoned. Patrolling the perimeter and the immediate area reduced the ability of anti-Iraqi forces to attack the FOB.

Iraqi officials and Multi-National Division – Baghdad leaders transferred responsibility of Forward Operating Base Duke to Iraqi security forces during a press conference on October 1, 2006.

== See also ==
- List of United States Military installations in Iraq
