= 98th Cavalry Regiment =

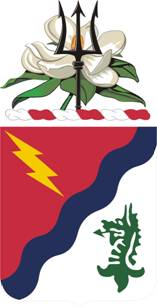
- coat of arms
- Active: 1959
- Country: United States
- Branch: Mississippi Army National Guard
- Motto: MERIDIANUS ADAMANTINUS (Southern Steel)
- Branch color: Yellow

Insignia
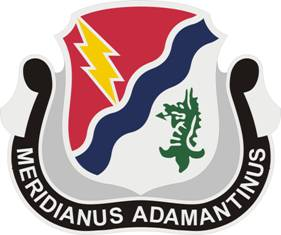
- Distinctive Unit Insignia

The 98th Cavalry Regiment is a parent regiment of the United States Army established in 2006. It is represented in the Mississippi Army National Guard by the 1st Squadron, 98th Cavalry, an element of the 155th Armored Brigade Combat Team.

== History ==
The 1st Squadron, 98th Cavalry of the Mississippi National Guard follows the lineage of the 1st Battalion, 198th Armor Regiment and A Troop, 98th Cavalry. An earlier unit to carry this unit designation was another Mississippi unit that later became the 2nd Squadron, 198th Armor in the Mississippi Delta and, later still, the 2nd Battalion, 198th Armor.

The 1st Squadron traces its lineage back to the 750th Tank Battalion, which was constituted in the Mississippi Army National Guard and organized on 1 May 1959 by the redesignation of existing companies. Part of the 31st Infantry Division's headquarters at Greenville (previously organized on 22 May 1956) was redesignated as the 750th's Headquarters, Headquarters, and Service Company. Company C of the 134th Engineer Battalion at Leland, which had been organized on 22 May 1956, became Company A. Company B was redesignated from the 114th Field Artillery Battalion's Service Battery at Indianola, which had been organized on 10 April 1947. Company C was redesignated from Company E of the 155th Infantry at Cleveland.

Company E was organized on 4 December 1929 and inducted into Federal service on 25 November 1940. It served with the 31st Division in World War II and was inactivated at Camp Stoneman on 12 December 1945. The company was reorganized and Federally recognized on 28 May 1947. It was ordered into active Federal service on 16 January 1951 during the Korean War, but remained stateside and was released from active service on 30 June 1954. The 750th was redesignated as the 1st Squadron, 98th Cavalry, on 1 May 1963, part of the 31st Division. On 15 February 1968, the regiment was reorganized to consist of Troop D, a non-divisional unit at Jackson, part of the 131st Aviation Battalion at Hawkins Field. The 1968 reorganization resulted in the 1st Squadron, 98th Cavalry being reorganized as the 2nd Battalion, 198th Armor. On 1 November 1973 Troop A, 98th Cavalry was reorganized at Louisville from Troop C, 1st Squadron, 230th Cavalry to serve as the brigade reconnaissance troop of the newly formed 155th Armored Brigade.

== Distinctive unit insignia ==
- Description

A Silver color metal and enamel device 1 3/8 inches (3.5 cm) in width overall consisting of a shield blazoned as follows: Per bend sinister Gules and Argent, between in dexter chief a lightning flash bendwise Or and in sinister base a griffin's head erased Vert, a sinister bend wavy Azure (Flag Blue). Attached below and to the sides of the shield a Black motto scroll inscribed "MERIDIANUS ADAMANTINUS" in Silver.

- Symbolism

Scarlet and white represent Cavalry and refer also to Recon Squadron associations. The wavy sinister bend represents Infantry and the Mississippi River, in the unit's home state. The yellow lightning flash refers to the unit's deployment to Iraq and represents the 155th Armored Brigade Combat Team. The green griffin's head represents the affiliation with the 198th Armor Regiment and firepower. Green refers to association with Armor.

- Background

The distinctive unit insignia was approved on 11 June 2008.

== Coat of arms ==
=== Blazon ===
- Shield

Per bend sinister Gules and Argent, between in dexter chief a lightning flash bendwise Or and in sinister base a griffin's head erased Vert, a sinister bend wavy Azure (Flag Blue).

- Crest

That for the regiments and separate battalions of the Mississippi Army National Guard: From a wreath Argent and Gules, a slip of magnolia full flower with leaves Proper behind a trident Sable. Motto MERIDIANUS ADAMANTINUS (Southern Steel).

  - Symbolism
- Shield

Scarlet and white represent Cavalry and refer also to Recon Squadron associations. The wavy sinister bend represents Infantry and the Mississippi River, in the unit's home state. The yellow lightning flash refers to the unit's deployment to Iraq and represents the 155th Armored Brigade Combat Team. The green griffin's head represents the affiliation with the 198th Armor Regiment and firepower. Green refers to association with Armor.

- Crest

The crest is that of the Mississippi Army National Guard.

- Background

The coat of arms was approved on 11 June 2008.

== See also ==
- List of armored and cavalry regiments of the United States Army
