= 155th Infantry Regiment (United States) =

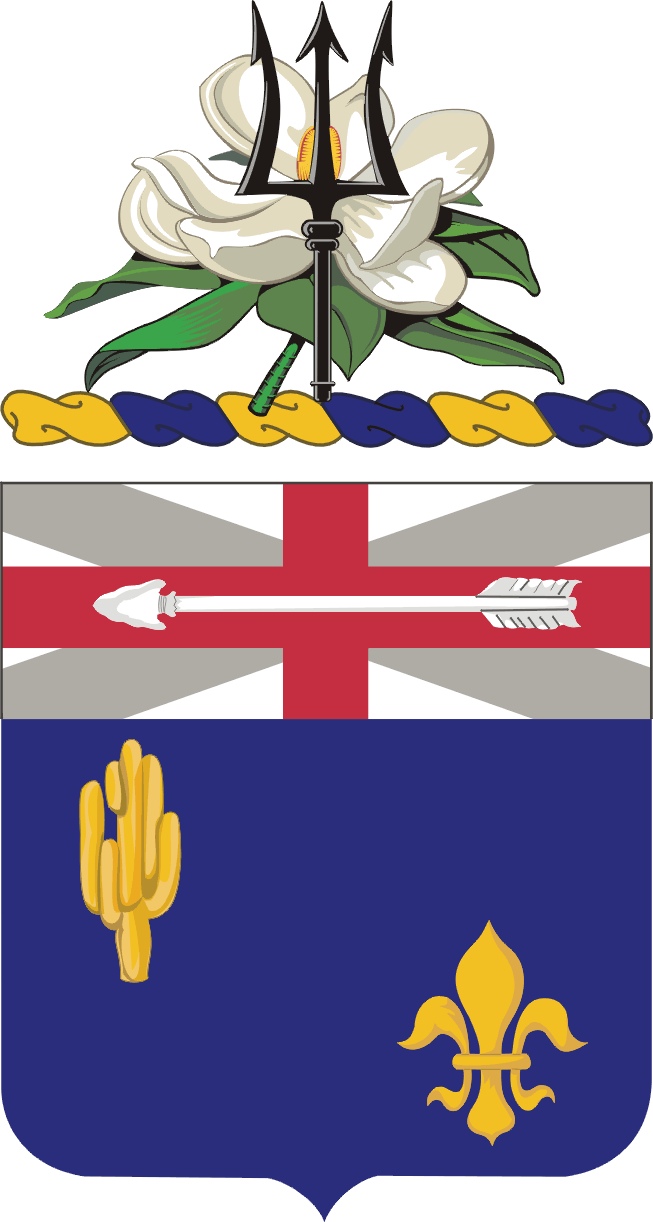
- Coat of arms
- Active: 1799–present
- Country: United States
- Branch: United States Army
- Nickname: Mississippi Rifles (Special Designation)
- Motto: Stand Fast
- Engagements: War of 1812; Mexican–American War; Civil War; Spanish–American War; Punitive Expedition; World War I World War II; Bosnia; Iraq Campaign

Commanders
- Notable commanders: Andrew Jackson; Jefferson Davis

Insignia
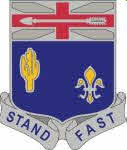
- Distinctive unit insignia

The "Mississippi Rifles" or the 155th Infantry Regiment, is Mississippi's oldest National Guard unit. Its history predates statehood, back to June 1799, and it is the seventh oldest infantry regiment in the United States Army. They patrolled the frontiers of the Mississippi Territory, captured Aaron Burr, defended Fort Mims during the Indian Wars, and served under General Andrew Jackson in the Battle of New Orleans in the War of 1812.

== History ==
The 155th Infantry is one of only twenty-four currently active Army National Guard units with campaign credits for the War of 1812, and one of only two from a state west of the Appalachians. It has credit for the Florida (1814) and New Orleans Campaigns.

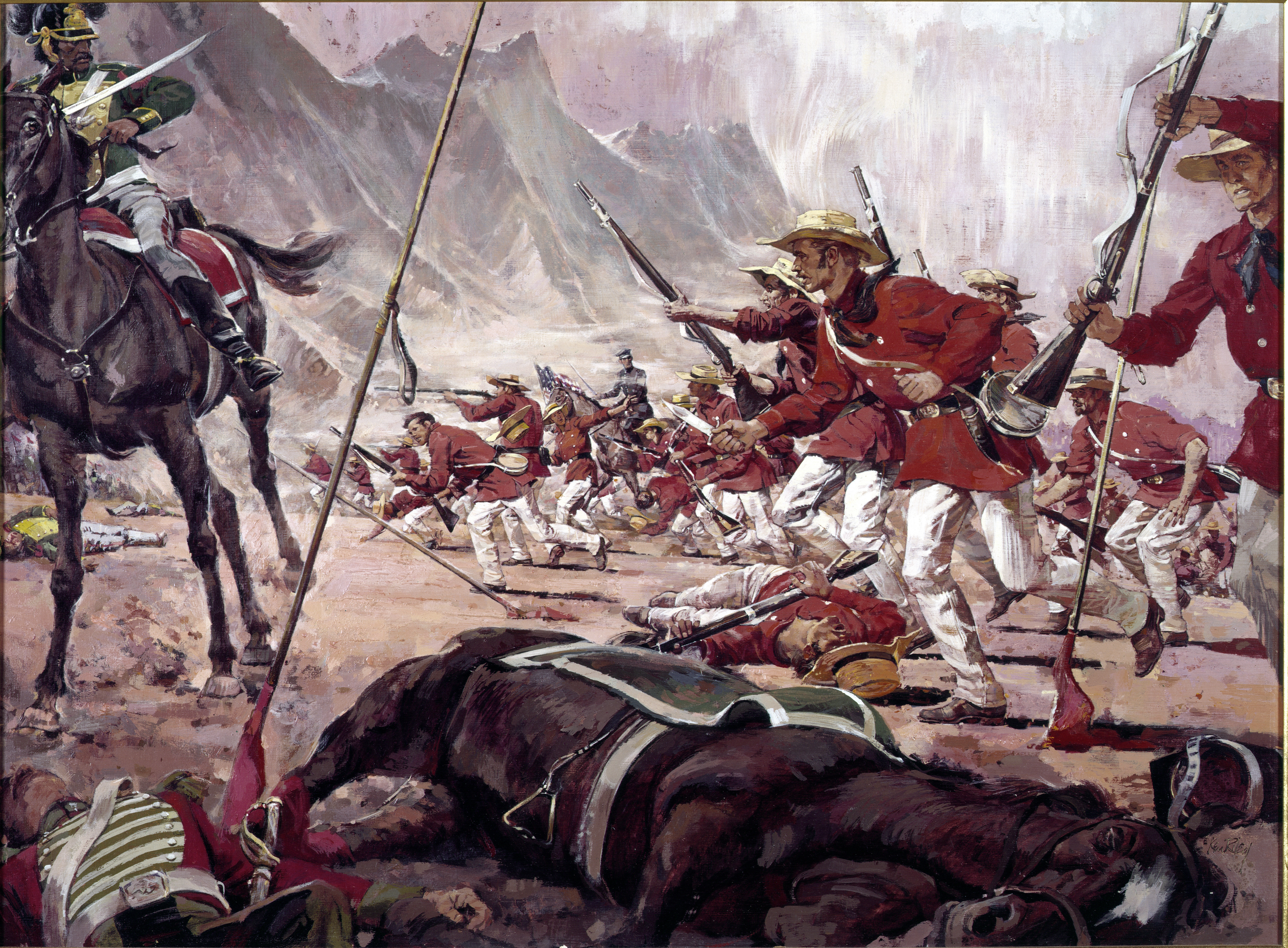
155th Infantry Regiment fighting in Buena Vista, Mexico, 23 February 1847

They were known as the "Mississippi Rifles" under the command of Colonel Jefferson Davis in the war with Mexico. They acquired this nickname because the regiment was the first in American history to have an official issue rifle (M1841 Mississippi rifle) instead of a smoothbore musket. It was at the Battle of Buena Vista when other American units began to be overrun by the Mexicans that Col. Davis gave the order, "Stand fast, Mississippians!" The regiment stood their ground and the battle was eventually won. Davis' order later became the regimental motto.

Instead of the standard US Army uniform, the regiment was outfitted in red shirts, white duck trousers, and black slouch hats. The unit was instrumental in winning the Battle of Monterrey, and mustered for service in the Spanish–American War.

=== Mexican Expedition ===
The Mississippi Rifles went with General Pershing's "Punitive Expedition" in Mexico and fought against Pancho Villa in 1916.

=== World War I ===
In World War I, under the War Department's new numbering scheme for regiments, the 1st Mississippi Infantry and detachments from Companies F and H, 2nd Mississippi Infantry, were combined and redesignated the 155th Infantry Regiment. The 155th served with the 39th Division in France, however, it did not see combat and was instead used as a "depot" unit along with the rest of the division, receiving, orienting, and forwarding replacements to frontline combat units.

=== Interwar period ===
The 155th Infantry arrived at the port of Newport News, Virginia, on 31 December 1918 on the USS Princess Matoika, and was demobilized 23 January 1919 at Camp Beauregard, Louisiana. Per the terms of the National Defense Act of 1920, the 155th Infantry was reconstituted in the National Guard in 1921, assigned to the 39th Division, and allotted to the state of Mississippi. It was reorganized on 2 November 1921 by redesignation of the 1st Infantry, Mississippi National Guard (organized 1919–20 with headquarters at Vicksburg, Mississippi) as the 155th Infantry; the headquarters was subsequently federally recognized on 25 April 1923 at Vicksburg. It was relieved from the 39th Division on 1 July 1923 and assigned to the 31st Division. The regiment, or elements thereof, was called up to perform the following state duties: the entire regiment to perform flood relief duty at communities flooded by the Mississippi River in April–June 1927; 1st Battalion to perform escort duty in connection with protecting Negro prisoners against race riots at Jackson and Magnolia, Mississippi, 22–23 October 1931. The regiment conducted annual summer training at numerous state and federally-owned locations to include: Camp Williamson, near Vicksburg, Mississippi; Camp Benjamin F. McClellan, near Biloxi, Mississippi; Camp Shelby, near Hattiesburg, Mississippi; Camp (later Fort) McClellan, Alabama; and Camp Beauregard. The 155th Infantry was inducted into active federal service at Vicksburg on 20 November 1940 and moved to Camp Blanding, Florida, where it arrived on 21 December 1940.

=== World War II to present ===
In World War II, the regiment fought with the 31st Infantry Division in the Pacific Theater. During the Korean War the regiment was ordered into federal service but remained stateside, although many members went forward to fight. During the 1950s, all but the 1st Battalion were deactivated. The 1st Battalion (Combined Arms), 155th Infantry (Mechanized) is now a part of the 155th Armored Brigade Combat Team (155th ABCT), Mississippi Army National Guard. The unit served in Bosnia as "Task Force Rifles" and in Iraq in 2005–06 and again in 2009–10. The battalion is headquartered in McComb and has mechanized infantry companies in Biloxi (Company A) and Poplarville (Company B), an armored (tank) company in Kiln (Company C) and a forward support company (Company I, 106th Brigade Support Battalion) in Brookhaven.
