= 1st Cavalry Division (United States) =

United States Army combat formation

- The 1st Cavalry Division's shoulder sleeve insignia
- Founded: 20 August 1921–present
- Country: United States of America
- Branch: United States Army
- Role: Armored Cavalry
- Size: Division
- Part of: III Armored Corps
- Garrison/HQ: Fort Hood, Texas
- Nickname: "First Team"
- Motto: "America's First Team!"
- March: "Garryowen"
- Mascot: Kidron the Horse
- Engagements: World War II; New Guinea; Bismarck Archipelago; Leyte; Luzon; Korean War; UN Defensive; UN Offensive; CCF Intervention; First UN Counteroffensive; CCF Spring Offensive; UN Summer-Fall Offensive; Second Korean Winter; Vietnam War; Gulf War; Defense of Saudi Arabia; Liberation of Kuwait; Bosnia-Herzegovina; Kosovo Force; War on terror; Iraq War; Afghanistan War; Operation Inherent Resolve
- Decorations: Presidential Unit Citation (United States); Valorous Unit Award; Meritorious Unit Commendation1990–1991; Meritorious Unit Commendation 2009–2010; Philippine Presidential Unit Citation 1944–1945; Republic of Korea Presidential Unit Citation; Chryssoun Aristion Andrias (Bravery Gold Medal of Greece); Republic of Vietnam Cross of Gallantry with Palm 1965-1969; Republic of Vietnam Cross of Gallantry with Palm 1969-1970; Republic of Vietnam Cross of Gallantry with Palm 1970-1971; Republic of Vietnam Civil Action Honor Medal, First Class 1969-1970
- Website: Official Website

Commanders
- Current commander: Brigadier General; Chad C. Chalfont
- Notable commanders: Full list of commanders

Insignia
- Distinctive unit insignia

- Flag

The 1st Cavalry Division ("First Team") is a combined arms division and is one of the most decorated combat divisions of the United States Army. It is based at Fort Hood, Texas. It was formed in 1921 and served during World War II, the Korean War, the Vietnam War, the Persian Gulf War, with the Stabilization Force in Bosnia and Herzegovina, the Iraq War, the War in Afghanistan as well as Operation Freedom's Sentinel and Operation Inherent Resolve. As of August 2026, the 1st Cavalry Division is subordinate to the III Armored Corps and is commanded by Brigadier General Chad C. Chalfont.

The unit is unique in that it has served as a cavalry division, an infantry division, an air assault division and an armored division during its existence.

== History ==
=== Interwar period ===
The history of the 1st Cavalry Division began in 1921, after the Army established a permanent cavalry division table of organization and equipment on 4 April 1921. It authorized a square division organization of 7,463 officers and men, organized as follows:

- Headquarters Element (34 men)
- Two Cavalry Brigades (2,803 men each)
- Field Artillery Battalion (790 men)
- Engineer Battalion (357 men)
- Division Quartermaster Trains Command (276 men)
- Special Troops Command (337 men)
- Ambulance Company (63 men)

On 20 August 1921, the War Department constituted the 1st and 2nd Cavalry Divisions in the Regular Army to meet partial mobilization requirements, authorizing the establishment of the 1st Cavalry Division under the new TO&E on 31 August 1921. Since the 1st Cavalry Division was to be organized from existing units, the division headquarters was activated on 13 September 1921, even though all of the division's subordinate units did not arrive until 1922.

The 1st Cavalry Division was allotted to the Eighth Corps Area and assigned to the Third Army. The division headquarters and 2nd Cavalry Brigade were located at Fort Bliss, Texas, while the 1st Cavalry Brigade was stationed at Camp Harry J. Jones in Douglas, Arizona. The headquarters facilities used by the 1st Cavalry Division were those previously vacated by the 8th Brigade when it was commanded by MG John J. Pershing in 1916, and the wartime 15th Cavalry Division, which had existed at Fort Bliss between 10 December 1917 and 12 May 1918.

The 1st, 7th, and 8th Cavalry Regiments had previously been assigned to the wartime 15th Cavalry Division until they were returned to the Eighth Corps Area troop list on 12 May 1918. The 1st Cavalry Regiment remained assigned until it was transferred to the 1st Cavalry Division on 20 August 1921. The 7th, 8th, and 10th Cavalry Regiments were transferred on 13 September 1921, although the assignment of the 10th Cavalry Regiment to the 1st Cavalry Division was controversial because the transfer violated the Jim Crow laws. This controversy continued until 18 December 1922, when the 5th Cavalry Regiment, then on the VIII Corps Area Troop List, swapped places with the 10th Cavalry Regiment.

In 1923, the 1st Cavalry Division held division maneuvers for the first time, intending to hold them annually thereafter. However, financial constraints made that impossible. Only in 1927, through the generosity of a few ranchers who provided free land, was the division able to conduct such exercises again. In 1928 Major General Herbert B. Crosby, Chief of Cavalry, faced with personnel cuts, reorganized the cavalry regiments, which in turn reduced the size of the 1st Cavalry Division. Crosby's goal was to decrease overhead while maintaining or increasing firepower in the regiments. After the reorganization, each cavalry regiment consisted of a headquarters and headquarters troop, a machine gun troop, a medical and chaplain element, and two squadrons, each with a headquarters element and two line troops. The cavalry brigades' machine gun squadrons were inactivated, while the responsibility for training and employing machine guns fell to the regimental commanders, as in the infantry.

At about the same time, Crosby cut the cavalry regiment, and the army staff, seeking to increase the usefulness of the wartime cavalry division, published new tables of organization for an even larger unit. The new structure increased the size of the signal troop (177), expanded the medical unit to a squadron (233), and endorsed Crosby's movement of the machine gun units from the brigades to the regiments (2x176). A divisional aviation section, an armored car squadron (278), and a tank company (155) were added, the field artillery battalion was expanded to a regiment (1,717), and divisional strength rose to 9,595.

=== Prelude to World War II ===
With the arrival of the 1930s, serious work started on the testing and refining of new equipment and TO&Es for a mechanized and motorized army. To facilitate this, the 1st Cavalry Division traded the 1st Cavalry Regiment, which was in the process of being reorganized as a separate mechanized unit, for the 12th Cavalry Regiment from the 2nd Cavalry Division on 3 January 1933. Taking into account recommendations from the VIII Corps Area, the Army War College, and the Command and General Staff School, the board developed a new smaller triangular cavalry division, which the 1st Cavalry Division evaluated during maneuvers at Toyahvale, Texas, in 1938. Like the 1937 infantry division test, the maneuvers concentrated on the divisional cavalry regiments around which all other units were to be organized.

Following the test, a board of 1st Cavalry Division officers, headed by Brigadier General Kenyon A. Joyce, rejected the three-regiment division and recommended retention of the two-brigade (four-regiment) organization. The latter configuration allowed the division to deploy easily in two columns, which was accepted as standard cavalry tactics. However, the board advocated reorganizing the cavalry regiment along triangular lines, which would give it a headquarters and headquarters troop, a machine gun squadron with special weapons and machine gun troops, and three rifle squadrons, each with one machine gun and three rifle troops. No significant change was made in the field artillery, but the test showed that the engineering element should remain a squadron to provide the divisional elements greater mobility on the battlefield and that the special troops idea should be extended to include the division headquarters, signal, and ordnance troops; quartermaster, medical, engineer, reconnaissance, and observation squadrons; and a chemical warfare detachment. One headquarters would assume responsibility for the administration and disciplinary control of these forces.

Although the study did not lead to a general reorganization of the cavalry division, the wartime cavalry regiment was restructured, effective 1 December 1938, to consist of a headquarters and headquarters troop, machine gun and special weapons troops, and three squadrons of three rifle troops each. The special troops remained as structured in 1928, and no observation squadron or chemical detachment found a place in the division. With the paper changes in the cavalry divisions and other minor adjustments, the strength of a wartime divisional rose to 10,680.

In order to prepare for war service, 1st Cavalry Division participated in the following maneuvers:

- Toyahvale, TX Maneuvers – 7 October through 30 October 1939.
- Cravens-Pitkin Louisiana Maneuvers – 13 August through 24 August 1940.
- Second 3rd Army Louisiana Maneuvers – 10 August through 4 October 1941.
- VIII Corps Louisiana Maneuvers near Mansfield, LA – 27 July 1942 – 21 September 1942.

=== World War II ===
==== Division organization ====
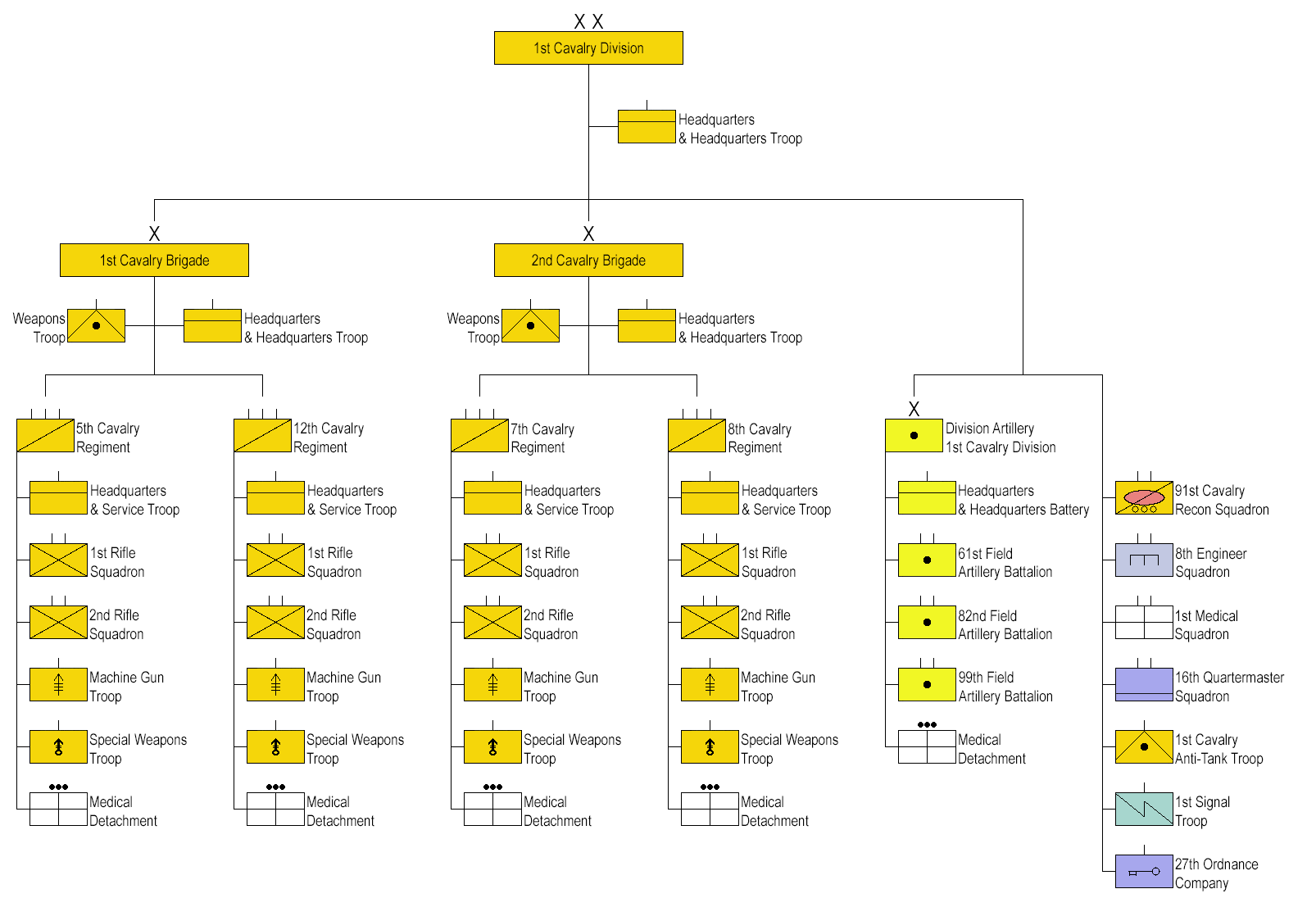
1st Cavalry Division early World War II organization

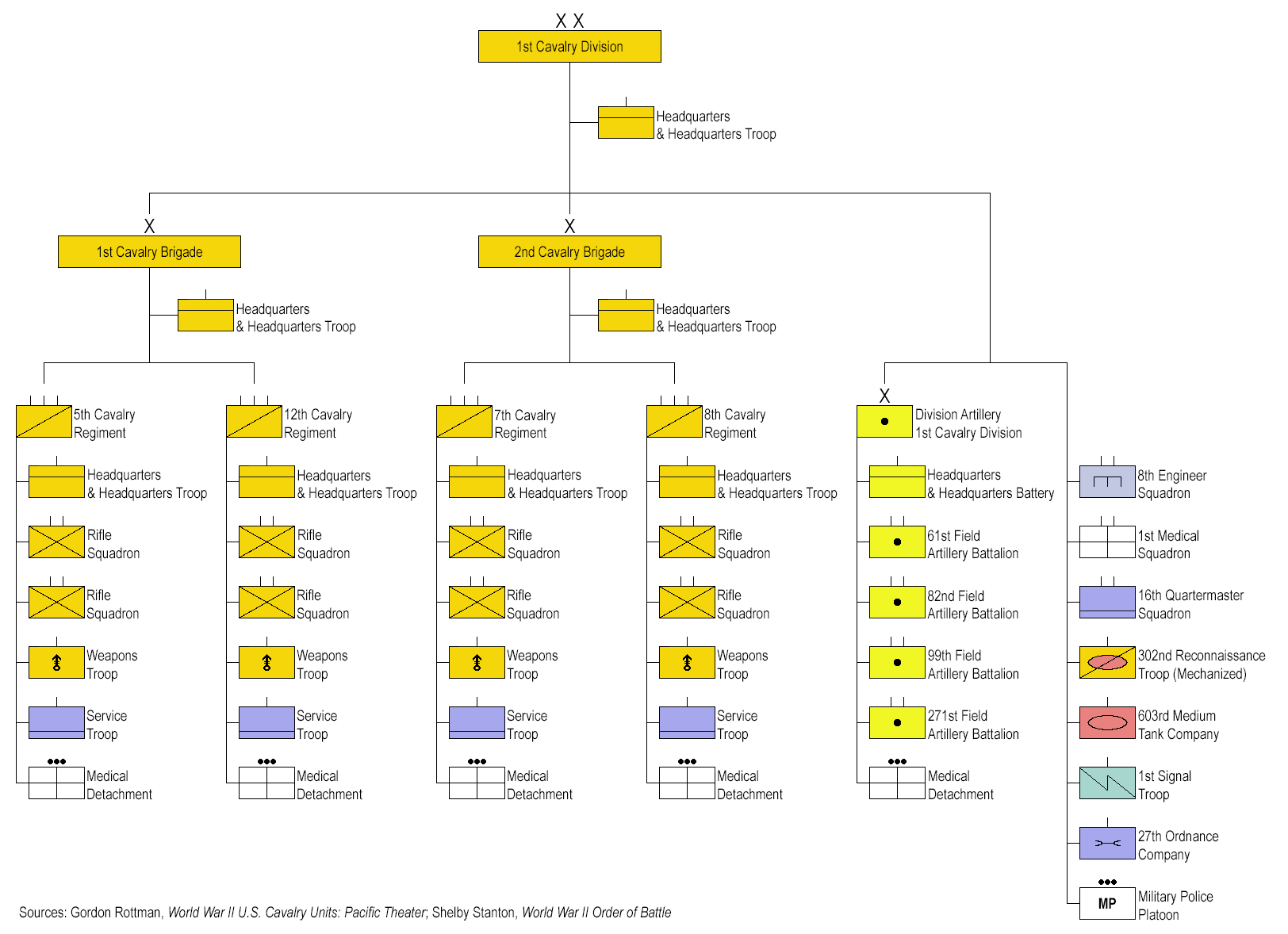
1st Cavalry Division 1944–1945 organization

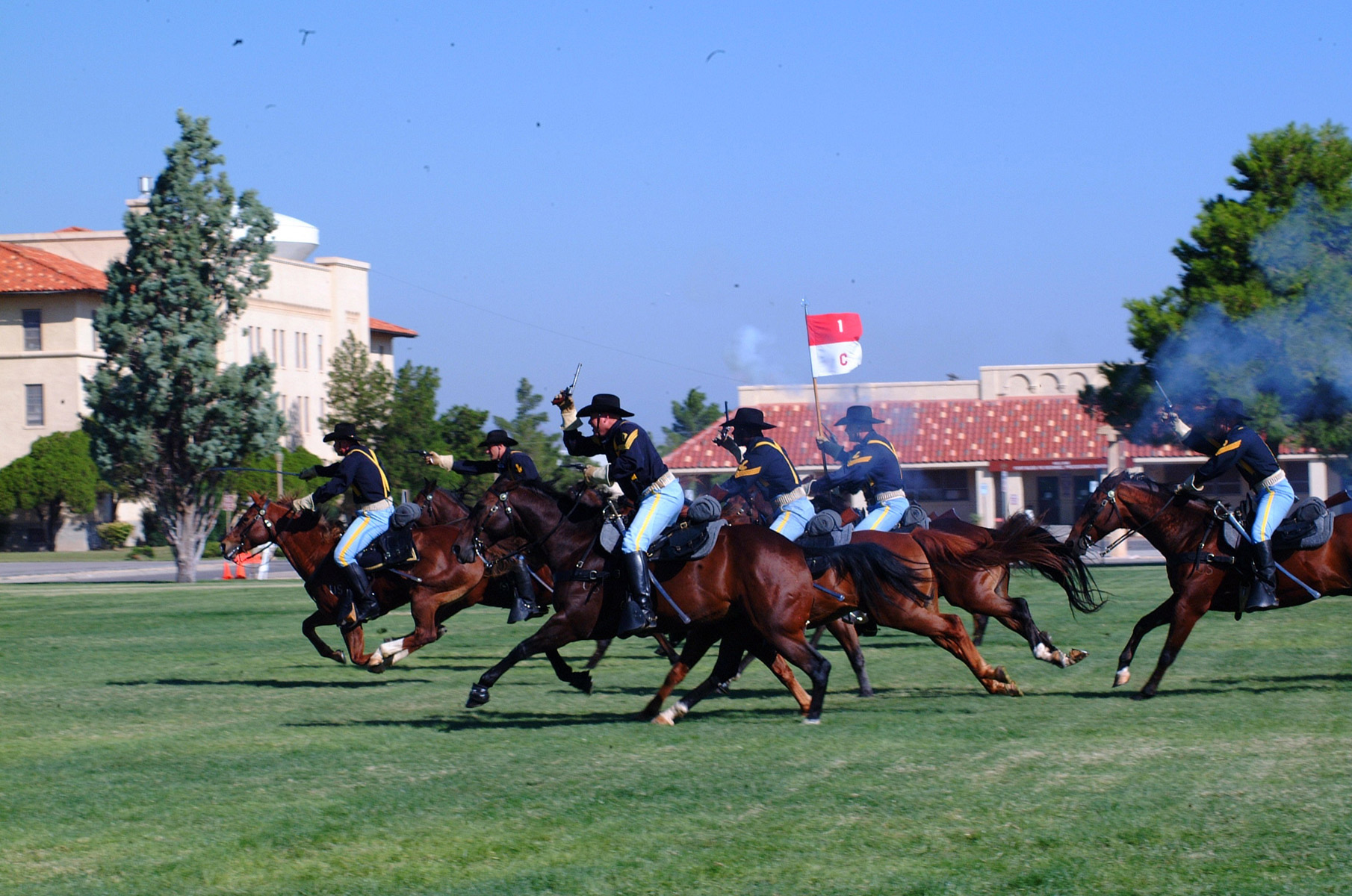
1st Cavalry Division's Horse Cavalry Detachment charge during a ceremony at Fort Bliss, Texas, 2005.

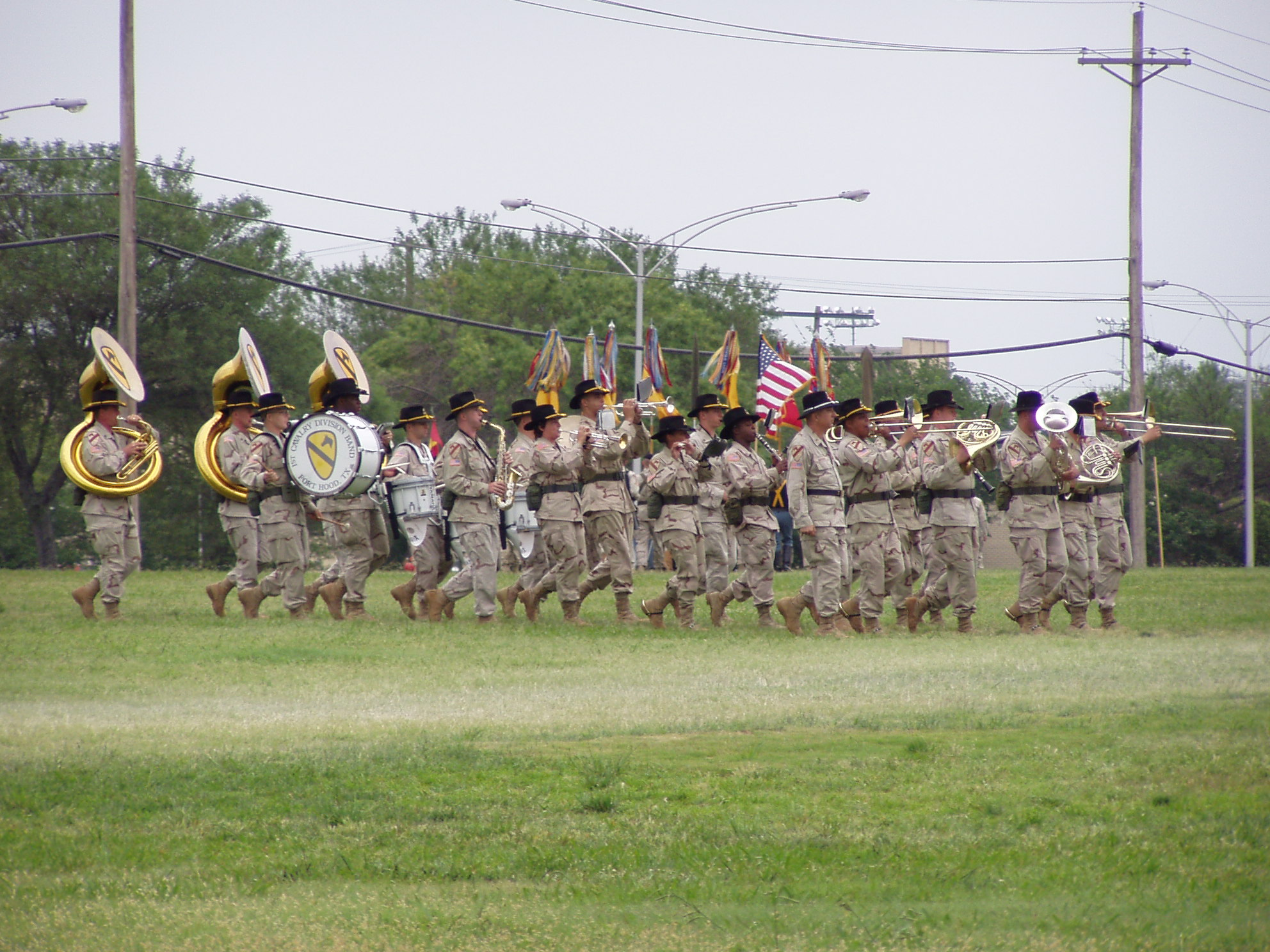
The 1st Cavalry Division Band during an Operation Iraqi Freedom 2 Color Uncasing Ceremony at Fort Hood, Texas in 2005.

The division was composed of the following units:

- 1st Cavalry Division
  - Headquarters and Headquarters Troop
  - 1st Cavalry Brigade
    - Headquarters and Headquarters Troop
    - Weapons Troop (M3 37mm anti-tank guns and M4 mortar carriers)
    - 5th Cavalry Regiment
      - Headquarters and Service Troop
      - 2× Rifle Squadrons
        - each squadron consists of: 1× Headquarters, 3× Rifle troops
      - Machine Gun Troop (M1919 .30-caliber machine guns)
      - Special Weapons Troop (M2 .50-caliber machine guns and M1 81mm mortars)
      - Medical Detachment
    - 12th Cavalry Regiment
      - same organization as 5th Cavalry Regiment
  - 2nd Cavalry Brigade
    - Headquarters and Headquarters Troop
    - Weapons Troop (M3 37mm anti-tank guns and M4 mortar carriers)
    - 7th Cavalry Regiment
      - same organization as 5th Cavalry Regiment
    - 8th Cavalry Regiment
      - same organization as 5th Cavalry Regiment
  - 1st Cavalry Division Artillery
    - Headquarters and Headquarters Battery
    - Medical Detachment
    - 61st Field Artillery Battalion
      - Headquarters and Headquarters Battery
      - 3× Batteries (M1 75mm pack howitzers)
      - Service Battery
    - 62nd Field Artillery Battalion (left the division and deployed to Europe in 1942; replaced by the 99th Field Artillery Battalion)
      - Headquarters and Headquarters Battery
      - 3× Batteries (M2 105mm towed howitzers)
      - Service Battery
    - 82nd Field Artillery Battalion
      - same organization as 61st Field Artillery Battalion
    - 99th Field Artillery Battalion (joined the division in 1942)
      - same organization as 62nd Field Artillery Battalion
    - 271st Field Artillery Battalion (joined the division in October 1943)
      - same organization as 62nd Field Artillery Battalion
  - 91st Cavalry Reconnaissance Squadron (Mechanized) (left the division and deployed to North Africa in 1942)
    - Headquarters Detachment
    - 2× Reconnaissance troops (Mechanized) (M3 scout cars)
    - Armored Troop (M3 Stuart light tanks)
    - Motorcycle Troop
  - 1st Medical Squadron
    - Headquarters Detachment
    - Medical Collecting Troop
    - Medical Clearing Troop
    - Veterinary Troop
  - 8th Engineer Squadron
    - Headquarters and Service Troop
    - 2× Combat engineer troops
  - 16th Quartermaster Squadron
    - Headquarters Troop
    - 2× Quartermaster truck troops
    - Quartermaster Pack Troop
    - Quartermaster Light Maintenance Troop
  - 1st Cavalry Anti-Tank Troop (M3 37mm Anti-Tank guns)
  - 1st Signal Troop
  - 27th Ordnance Company
  - 302nd Reconnaissance Troop (joined the division after the 91st Cavalry Reconnaissance Squadron left the division)
  - 603rd Medium Tank Company
  - 801st Counter Intelligence Corps Detachment

==== Training ====
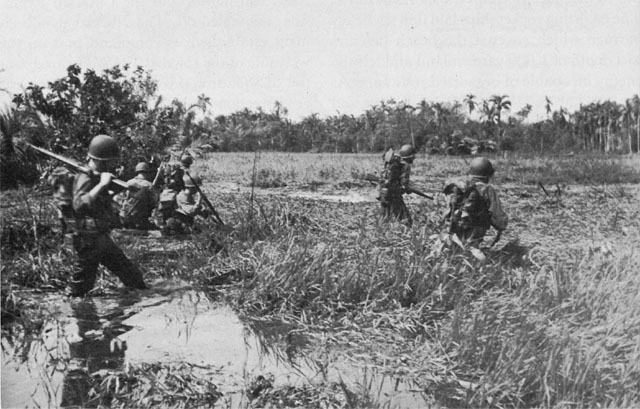
1st Cav soldiers during the Battle of Leyte.

With the attack on Pearl Harbor on 7 December 1941, the "great laboratory" phase for developing and testing organizations, about which Marshall wrote in the summer of 1941, closed, but the War Department still had not developed ideal infantry, cavalry, armored, and motorized divisions. In 1942 it again revised the divisions based on experiences gained during the great GHQ maneuvers of the previous year. As in the past, the reorganizations ranged from minor adjustments to wholesale changes.

1st Cavalry Division retained its square configuration after the 1941 maneuvers, but with modifications. The division lost its antitank troop, the brigades their weapons troops, and the regiments their machine gun and special weapons troops. These changes brought no decrease in divisional firepower, but placed most weapons within the cavalry troops. The number of .50-caliber machine guns was increased almost threefold. In the reconnaissance squadron, the motorcycle and armored car troops were eliminated, leaving the squadron with one support troop and three reconnaissance troops equipped with light tanks. These changes increased the division from 11,676 to 12,112 officers and enlisted men.

The last of the 1st Cavalry Division's mounted units permanently retired their horses and converted to infantry formations on 28 February 1943. However, a mounted special ceremonial unit known as the Horse Platoon – later, the Horse Cavalry Detachment – was established within the division in January 1972. Its ongoing purpose is to represent the traditions and heritage of the American horse cavalry at military ceremonies and public events.

1st Cavalry Division reported for its port call at Camp Stoneman, CA as follows:

| Unit | Staged | Departed | Arrived |
|---|---|---|---|
| HHT, 1st Cavalry Division | 21 June 1943 | 26 June | 11 July |
| HHT, 1st Cavalry Brigade | 21 June 1943 | 3 July | 24 July |
| HHT, 2nd Cavalry Brigade | 18 June 1943 | 26 June | 11 July |
| 5th Cavalry Regiment | 20 June 1943 | 2 July | 24 July |
| 7th Cavalry Regiment | 18 June 1943 | 26 June | 11 July |
| 8th Cavalry Regiment | 18 June 1943 | 26 June | 11 July |
| 12th Cavalry Regiment | 20 June 1943 | 3 July | 24 July |
| HHB, Division Artillery | | | |
| 61st Field Artillery Battalion | | 3 July 1943 | 24 July |
| 82nd Field Artillery Battalion | | 4 June 1943 | 23 June |
| 99th Field Artillery Battalion | | 23 May 1943 | 23 June |
| 8th Engineer Squadron | | 23 May 1943 | 18 June |
| 1st Medical Squadron | | | |
| 16th Quartermaster Squadron | | | |
| 7th Cavalry Recon Squadron | | 26 June 1943 | 11 July |
| 1st Antitank Troop | | | |
| 1st Signal Troop | | | |
| 101st Unit Search and Rescue Team | 10 May 1945 | | |

==== Combat chronicle ====
Although originally part of the III Corps (which eventually participated in the European Theater), while training in the United States, most of the 1st Cavalry Division arrived in Australia as shown above, continued its training at Strathpine, Queensland, until 26 July, then moved to New Guinea to stage for the Admiralties campaign 22–27 February 1944. The division experienced its first combat in the Admiralty Islands, units landing at Los Negros on 29 February 1944. Momote airstrip was secured against great odds. Attacks by the Japanese were thrown back, and the enemy force surrounded by the end of March. Nearby islands were taken in April and May. The division next took part in the invasion of Leyte, on 20 October 1944, captured Tacloban and the adjacent airstrip, advanced along the north coast, and secured Leyte Valley, with elements landing on and securing Samar Island. Moving down Ormoc Valley (in Leyte) and across the Ormoc plain, the division reached the west coast of Leyte on 1 January 1945.

The division then invaded Luzon, landing in the Lingayen Gulf area on 27 January 1945, and fought its way as a "flying column" to Manila by 3 February 1945. More than 3,000 civilian prisoners at the University of Santo Tomas, including more than 60 US Army nurses (some of the "Angels of Bataan and Corregidor") were liberated, and the 1st Cavalry then advanced east of Manila by the middle of February before the city was cleared. On 20 February the division was assigned the mission of seizing and securing crossings over the Marikina River and securing the Tagaytay-Antipolo Line. After being relieved on 12 March in the Antipolo area during the middle of the Battle of Wawa Dam, elements pushed south into Batangas and provinces of the Bicol Region together with recognized guerrillas. They mopped up the remaining pockets of resistance in these areas in small unit actions. Resistance was officially declared at an end on 1 July 1945.

==== Casualties ====
- Total battle casualties: 4,055
- Killed in action: 734
- Wounded in action: 3,311
- Missing in action: 9
- Prisoner of war: 1

=== Postwar ===
The division left Luzon on 25 August 1945 for occupation duty in Japan, arriving in Yokohama on 2 September 1945 and entering Tokyo on 8 September, the first United States division to enter the Japanese capital. 101 unit was set up in May 1945 to search for the missing soldiers in the Second World War. The detachment consisted of two officers (Captain MacColeman and Lieutenant Foley) and 15 enlisted members. The operation was successful, although it lasted three years. Occupation duty in Japan followed for the next five years.

=== Korean War ===
On 25 June 1950, North Korea attacked South Korea, and the 1st Cavalry Division was rushed to Korea to help shore up the Pusan Perimeter, landing on Pohang On 18 July 1950.

After the X Corps attack at Incheon, a breakout operation was launched at the Pusan Perimeter. The division then joined the UN counteroffensive that recaptured most of South Korea by the end of September. The UN offensive was continued northwards, past Seoul, and across the 38th Parallel into North Korea on 1 October. The momentum of the attack was maintained, and the race to the North Korean capital, Pyongyang, ended on 19 October when elements of the division and the Republic of Korea Army (ROK) 1st Infantry Division captured the city. The advance continued, but against unexpectedly stiffening resistance. The Chinese People's Volunteer Army (PVA) entered the war on the side of North Korea, making their first attacks in late October.

On 28 October 1950, Eighth Army commander General Walton Walker relieved the 1st Cavalry Division of its security mission in Pyongyang. The division's new orders were to pass through the ROK 1st Division's lines at Unsan and attack toward the Yalu River. Leading the way on the twenty-ninth, the 8th Cavalry Regiment departed Pyongyang and reached Yongsan-dong that evening. The 5th Cavalry Regiment arrived the next morning, with the mission to protect the 8th Cavalry Regiment's rear. With the arrival of the 8th Cavalry Regiment at Unsan on the 31st, the ROK 1st Division redeployed to positions northeast, east, and southeast of Unsan; the 8th Cavalry took up positions north, west, and south of the town. Meanwhile, the ROK 15th Regiment was desperately trying to hold its position east of the 8th Cavalry, across the Samt'an River.

During the afternoon of 1 November, the PVA attack north of Unsan gained strength against the ROK 15th Regiment and gradually extended to the right flank of the 1st Battalion, 8th Cavalry. At nightfall, the 1st Battalion controlled the northern approaches to the Samt'an River, except for portions of the ROK 15th Regiment's zone on the east side. The battalion's position on the left was weak; there were not enough soldiers to extend the defensive line to the main ridge leading into Unsan. This left a gap between the 1st and 2nd Battalions. East of the Samt'an the ROK 15th Regiment was under heavy attack, and shortly after midnight it no longer existed as a combat force. At 19:30 on 1 November, the PVA 116th Division attacked the 1st Battalion, 8th Cavalry, all along its line. At 21:00 PVA troops found the weak link in the ridgeline and began moving through it and down the ridge behind the 2nd Battalion, penetrating its right flank and encircling its left. Now both the 1st and 2nd Battalions were engaged by the enemy on several sides. Around midnight, the 8th Cavalry received orders to withdraw southward to Ipsok. At 01:30 on 2 November, no PVA activity was reported in the 3rd Battalion's sector south of Unsan. But as the 8th Cavalry withdrew, all three battalions became trapped by roadblocks made by the PVA 347th Regiment, 116th Division south of Unsan during the early morning hours. Members of the 1st Battalion who were able to escape reached the Ipsok area. A head count showed the battalion had lost about 15 officers and 250 enlisted men. Members of the 2nd Battalion, for the most part, scattered into the hills. Many of them reached the ROK lines near Ipsok. Others met up with the 3rd Battalion, the hardest hit. Around 03:00 the PVA launched a surprise attack on the battalion command post. Hand-to-hand fighting ensued for about half an hour before the PVA was driven from the area. The disorganized members of the 3rd Battalion formed a core of resistance around three tanks on the valley floor and held off the PVA until daylight. By that time, only six officers and 200 enlisted men were still able to function. More than 170 were wounded, and the number of dead or missing were uncounted. Attempts by the 5th Cavalry to relieve the beleaguered battalion were unsuccessful, and the 3rd Battalion, 8th Cavalry, soon ceased to exist as an organized force.

Following the battle, there were disparaging rumors about the 1st Cavalry Division's fighting abilities, including a folk song of the time called "The Bug-Out Ballad". The series of engagements that were rumored to have given rise to the song were due (at least partly) to the myth that the division lost its unit colors. Other Army and Marine units disparagingly described the division shoulder insignia as representing 'The horse they never rode, the river they never crossed, and the yellow speaks for itself'. Another version goes: "The shield they never carried, the horse they never rode, the bridge they never crossed, the line they never held, and the yellow is the reason why."

- Korean War casualties
  - 3,811 killed in action
  - 12,086 wounded in action
- Korean War honors
  - 9 Medal of Honor recipients:
    8th Engineer Battalion: Melvin L. Brown (4 September 1950).
    5th Cavalry Regiment: Lloyd L. Burke (28 October 1951), Samuel S. Coursen (12 December 1950), and Robert M. McGovern (30 January 1951).
    8th Cavalry Regiment: Emil Kapaun (1 and 2 November 1950) Tibor Rubin (23 July 1950, to 20 April 1953), James L. Stone (21 and 22 November 1952) Robert H. Young (9 October 1950)
    16th Reconnaissance Company: Gordon M. Craig (10 September 1950).
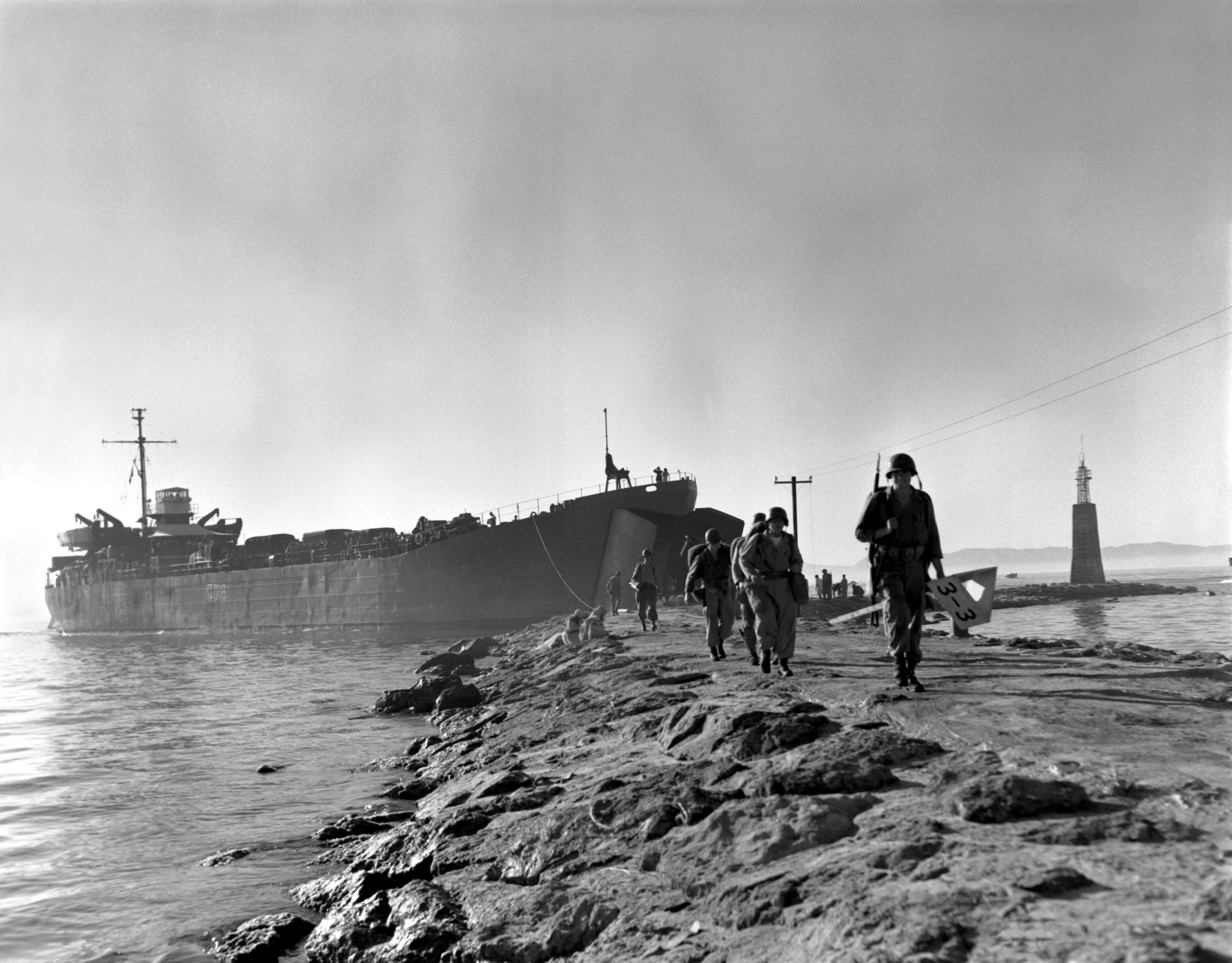
Division troops land at Pohang, Korea.

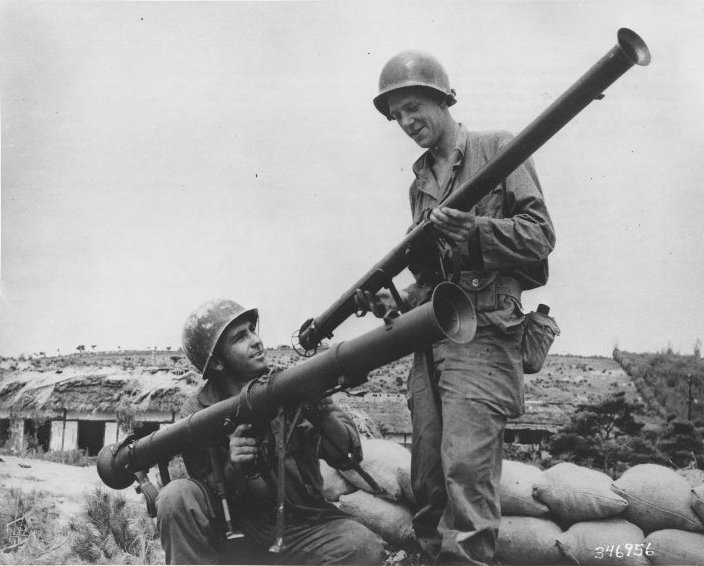
Cavalrymen holding a 2.36 in bazooka.

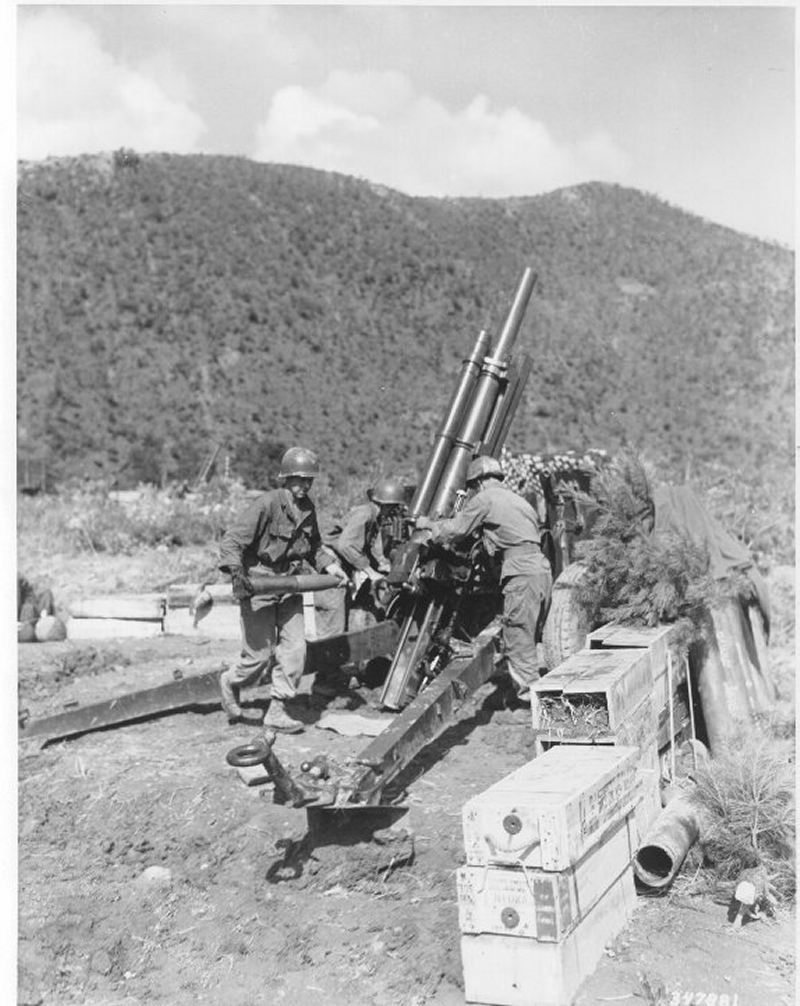
Gun crew of a 105mm howitzer in action along the 1st Cavalry Division sector.

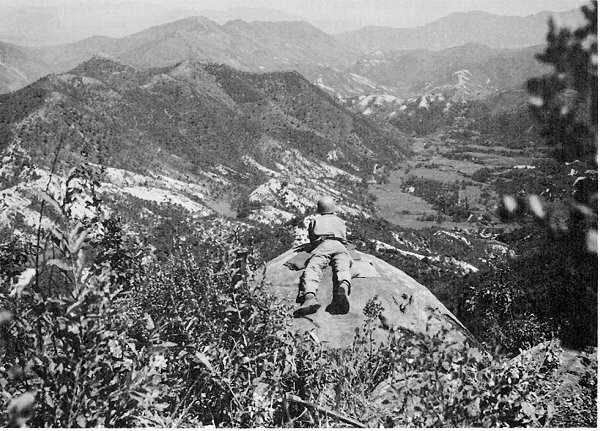
A Division observation post overlooks Hill 518, held by the North Koreans north of Waegwan. September 1950.

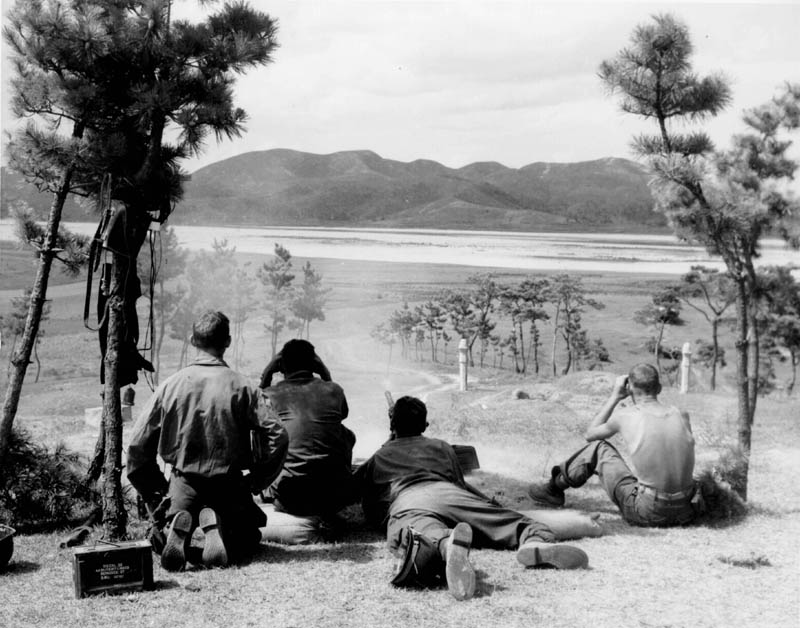
A .50 Cal. Machine gun squad of Co. E, 2nd Battalion, 7th Regiment, 1st Cavalry Division, fires on North Koreans along the north bank of the Naktong River, 26 August 1950.

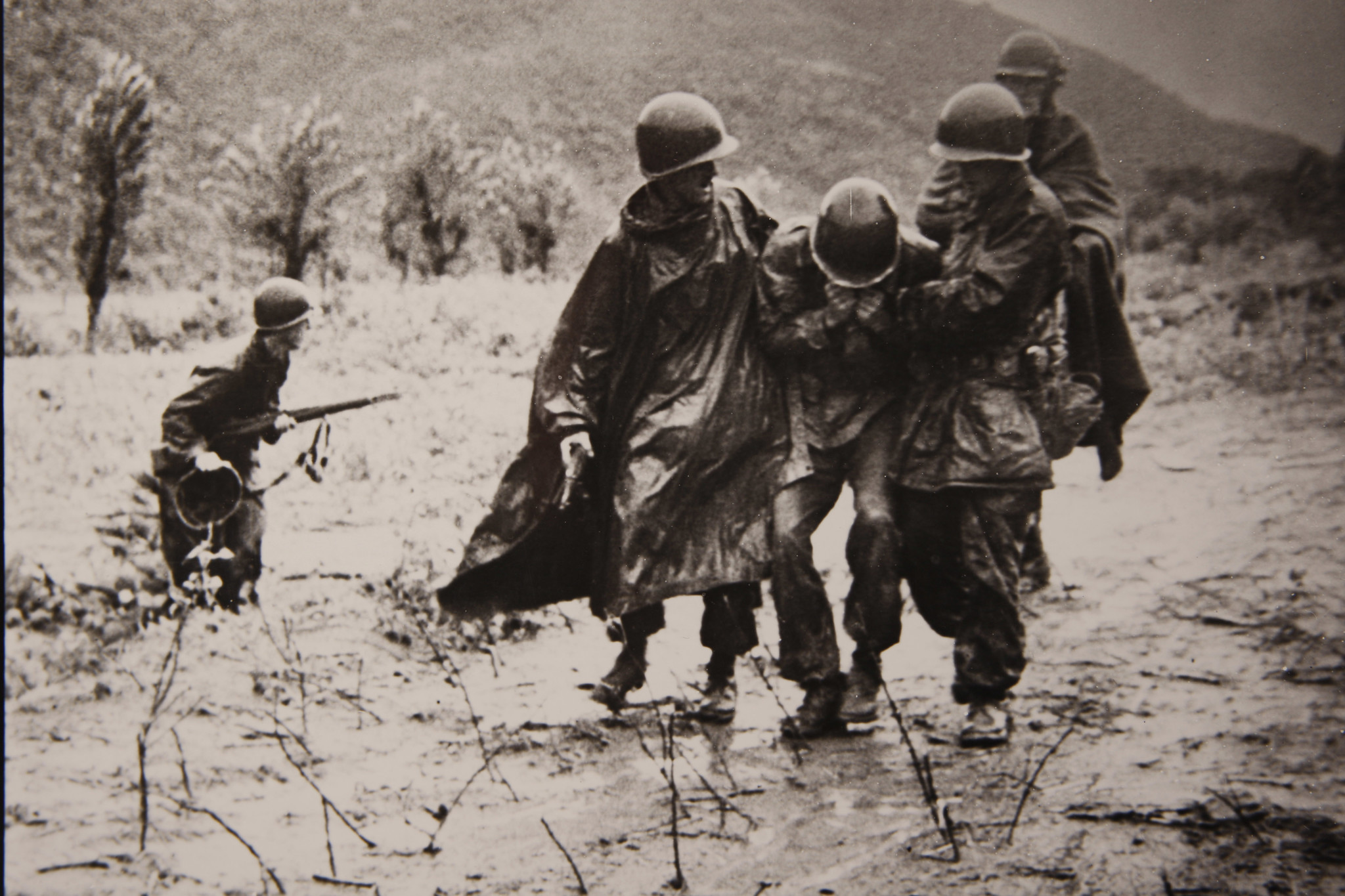
Capt. Emil Kapaun, right, a chaplain with the 3rd Battalion, 8th Cavalry Regiment, helps evacuate an exhausted soldier from the battlefield.

The 1st Cavalry Division remained in the line until it was relieved by the 45th Infantry Division from the Oklahoma Army National Guard in January 1952. Following the relief, the division returned to Japan. The division returned to Korea in 1957 (reflagged from the 24th Infantry Division), where it remained until 1965.

=== Vietnam War ===
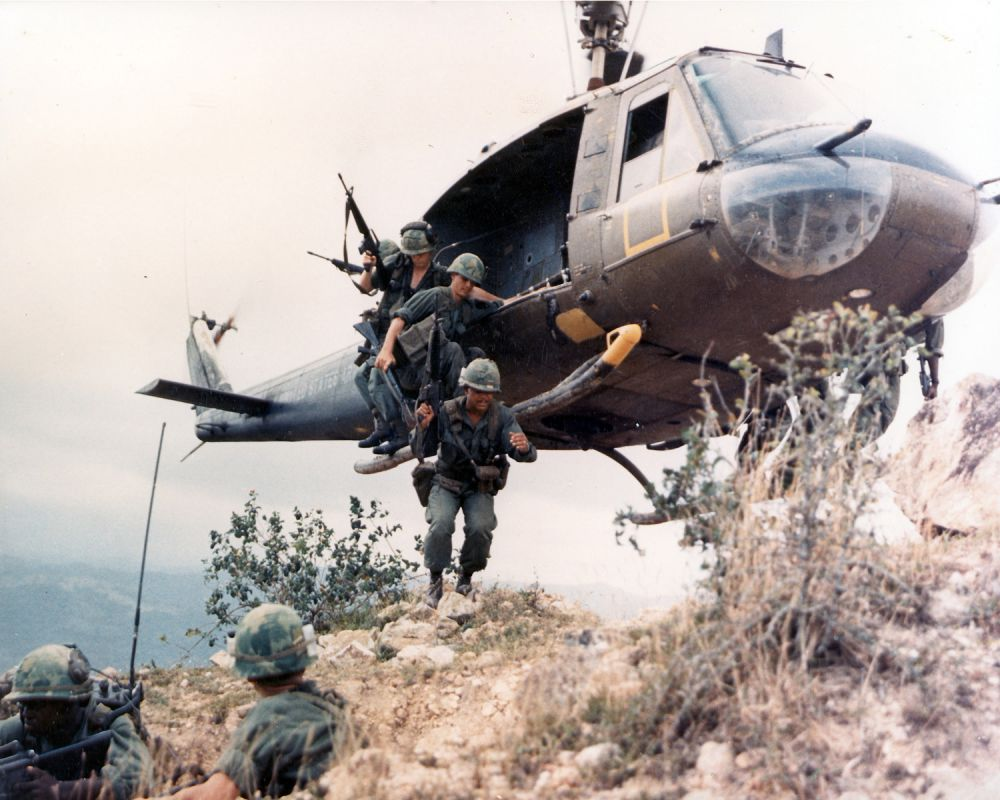
Troopers of the 1st Cavalry Division dismount from a hovering Huey helicopter.

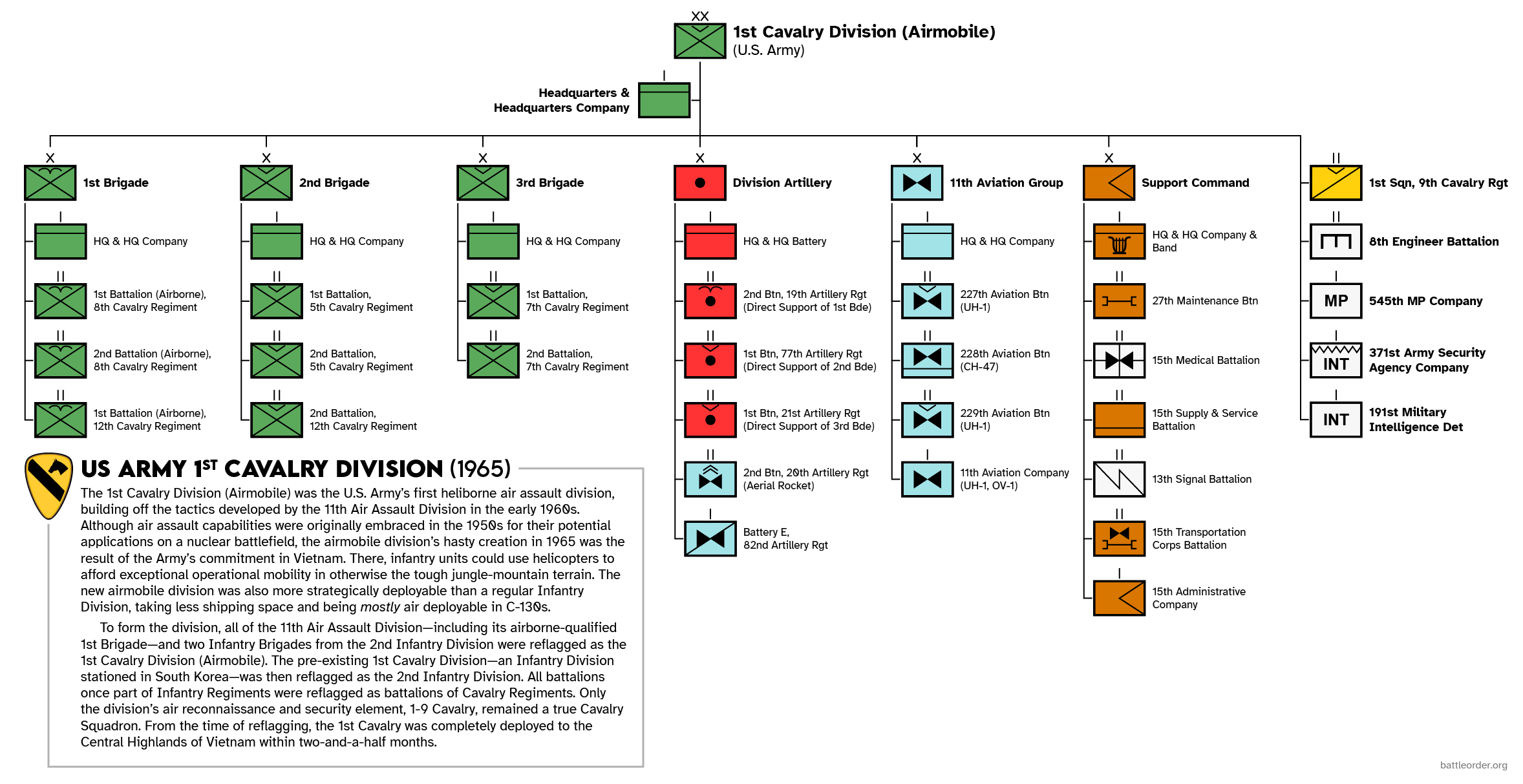
1st Cavalry Division (Airmobile) organization in 1965.

As a result of the Howze Board, helicopters were used in Vietnam for reconnaissance, command and control, troop transport, attack gunships, aerial rocket artillery, medical evacuation, and supply. It was a revolution in maneuver doctrine that freed the infantry from the limitations of terrain to attack the enemy at the time and place of its choosing.

The 11th Airborne Division had been reactivated at Fort Benning on 1 February 1963 and redesignated as the 11th Air Assault Division (Test). In September 1963, Air Assault I exercises tested the Airmobility concept at the battalion level at Fort Stewart in Georgia. Air Assault II, a much larger exercise, was conducted across two states in October 1964. The 11th Air Assault Division operated against the 82nd Airborne Division and the 11th thoroughly dominated the exercise.

When the test proved successful, the assets of the 11th Air Assault Division (Test), the 10th Air Transport Brigade, and the 2nd Infantry Division were merged into a single unit. The colors and subordinate unit designations of the 1st Cavalry Division were transferred from its post in Korea. On 3 July 1965, the colors of the 11th Air Assault Division (Test) were cased and retired and the 1st Air Cavalry Division colors were moved onto the field at Doughboy Stadium and passed to the commander of the former 11th Air Assault Division, Major General Kinnard. At the same time, the personnel and units of the 1st Cavalry Division that remained in Korea were reflagged as a new 2nd Infantry Division. On 29 July 1965, President Lyndon B. Johnson ordered the 1st Air Cavalry Division to Vietnam.

| 1st Cavalry Designation | Previous Designation |
|---|---|
| HHC, 1st Cavalry Division | HHC, 11th Air Assault Division (Test) |
| 1st Squadron, 9th Cavalry | 3rd Squadron, 17th Cavalry |
| HHC, 1st Brigade (Airborne), 1st Cavalry Division | HHC, 1st Brigade (Airborne), 11th Air Assault Division (Test) |
| 1st Battalion (Airborne), 8th Cavalry | 1st Battalion (Airborne), 188th Infantry |
| 2nd Battalion (Airborne), 8th Cavalry | 1st Battalion (Airborne), 511th Infantry |
| 1st Battalion (Airborne), 12th Cavalry | 1st Battalion (Airborne), 187th Infantry |
| HHC, 2nd Brigade, 1st Cavalry Division | HHC, 2nd Brigade, 2nd Infantry Division |
| 1st Battalion, 5th Cavalry | 1st Battalion, 38th Infantry |
| 2nd Battalion, 5th Cavalry | 2nd Battalion, 38th Infantry |
| 2nd Battalion, 12th Cavalry | 1st Battalion, 23rd Infantry |
| HHC, 3rd Brigade, 1st Cavalry Division | HHC, 3rd Brigade, 2nd Infantry Division |
| 1st Battalion, 7th Cavalry | 2d Battalion, 23d Infantry |
| 2nd Battalion, 7th Cavalry | 2nd Battalion, 9th Infantry |
| 5th Battalion, 7th Cavalry | 1st Battalion, 11th Infantry |
| HHB, 1st Cavalry Division Artillery | HHB, 11th Air Assault Division Artillery |
| 2nd Battalion (Airborne), 19th Artillery (105mm) | 6th Battalion, 81st Artillery (105mm) |
| 2nd Battalion, 20th Artillery (Aerial Rocket) | 3rd Battalion, 377th Artillery (Aerial Rocket) |
| 1st Battalion, 21st Artillery (105mm) | 5th Battalion, 38th Artillery (105mm) |
| 1st Battalion, 77th Artillery (105mm) | 1st Battalion, 15th Artillery (105mm) |
| Battery E, 82nd Artillery (AVN) | Battery E, 26th Artillery (AVN) |
| HHC & Band, Support Command, 1st Cavalry Division | HHC & Band, Support Command, 11th Air Assault Division (Test) |
| 15th Medical Battalion | 11th Medical Battalion |
| 15th Supply & Services Battalion | 408th Supply & Services Battalion |
| Aerial Equipment Supply Company (Airborne) | 165th Aerial Equipment Supply Detachment |
| 15th Administrative Company | 11th Administrative Company |
| 27th Maintenance Battalion | 711th Maintenance Battalion |
| 8th Engineer Battalion | 127th Engineer Battalion |
| 13th Signal Battalion | 511th Signal Battalion |
| 15th Transportation Battalion | 611th Aircraft Maintenance & Supply Battalion |
| 545th Military Police Company | 11th Military Police Company |
| 191st Military Intelligence Detachment | 11th Military Intelligence Detachment |
| 371st Army Security Agency Company | Company C, 313th Army Security Agency Battalion |

Shortly thereafter, the division began deploying to Camp Radcliff, An Khe, Vietnam, in the Central Highlands and was equipped with the new M16 rifle, the UH-1 troop carrier helicopter, UH-1C gunships, the CH-47 Chinook cargo helicopter, and the massive CH-54 Skycrane cargo helicopter. All aircraft carried insignia to indicate their battalion and company.

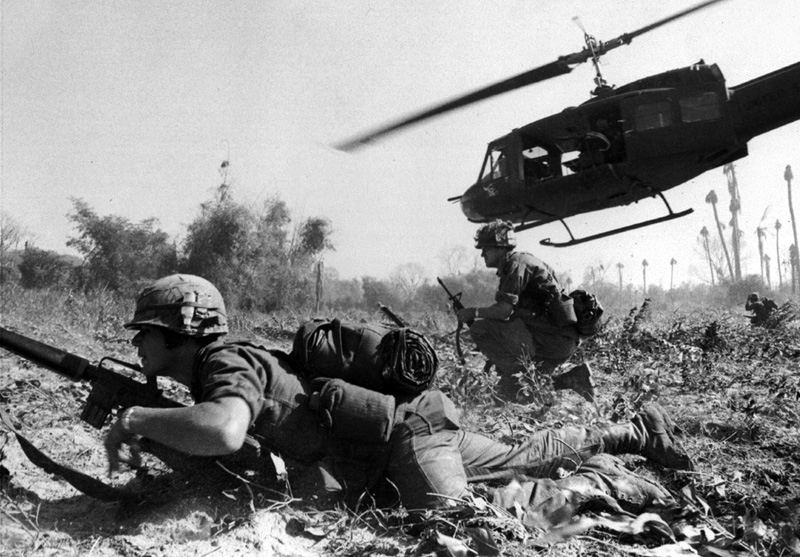
Major Bruce P. Crandall's UH-1D helicopter climbs after discharging infantrymen on a search and destroy mission in Ia Drang Valley in November 1965. .

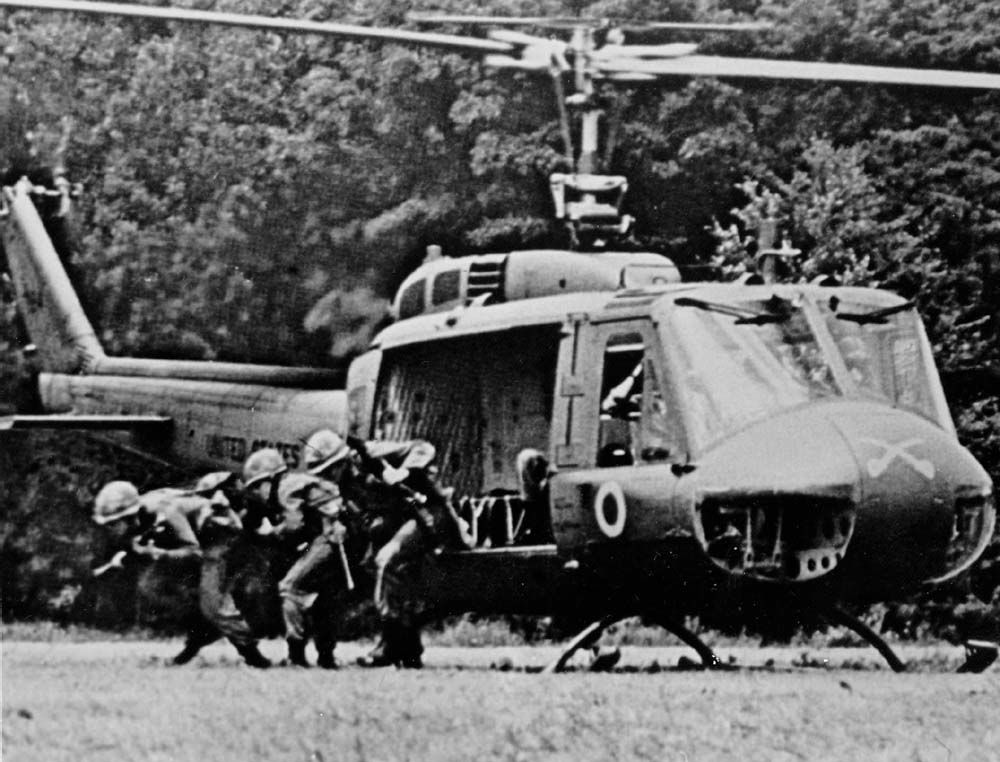
1st Air Cavalry troopers exit a Huey chopper in Vietnam.

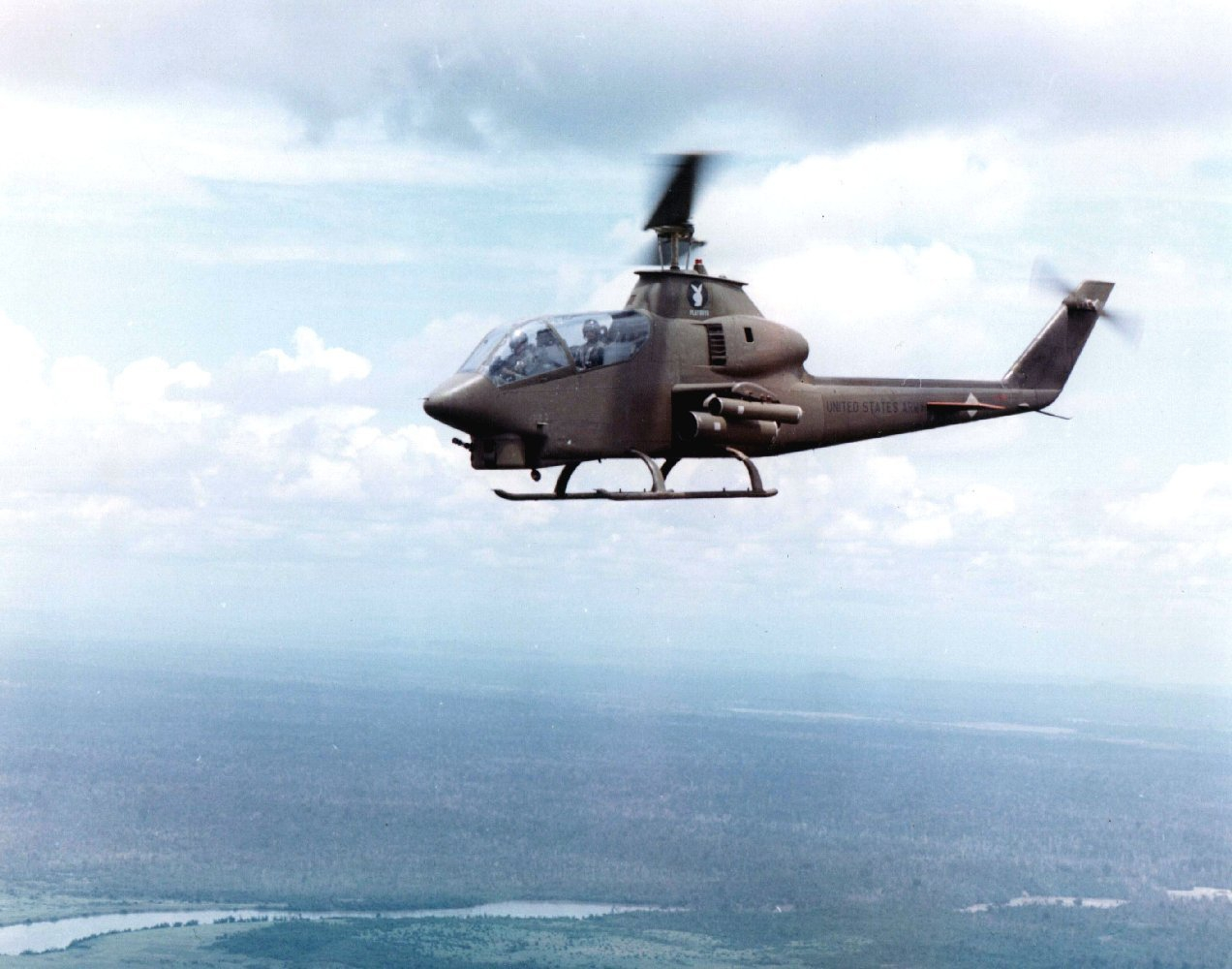
Bell AH-1G over Vietnam.

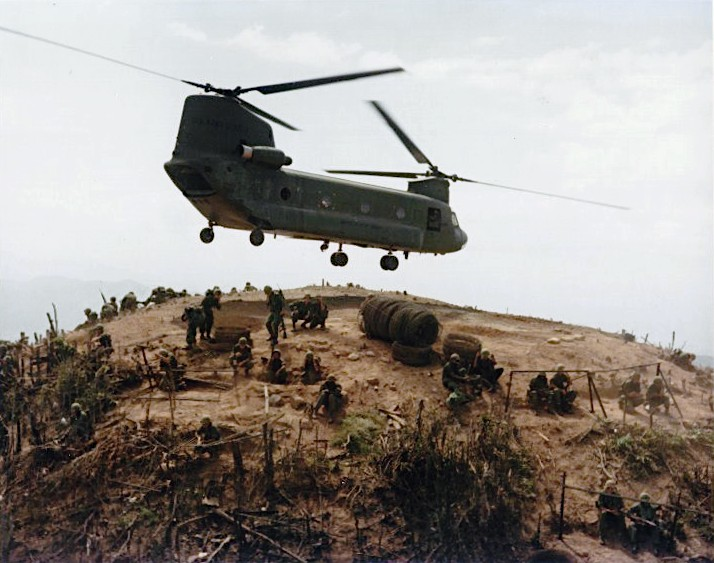
Troops unload from a CH-47 helicopter in the Cay Giep Mountains, Vietnam, 1967.

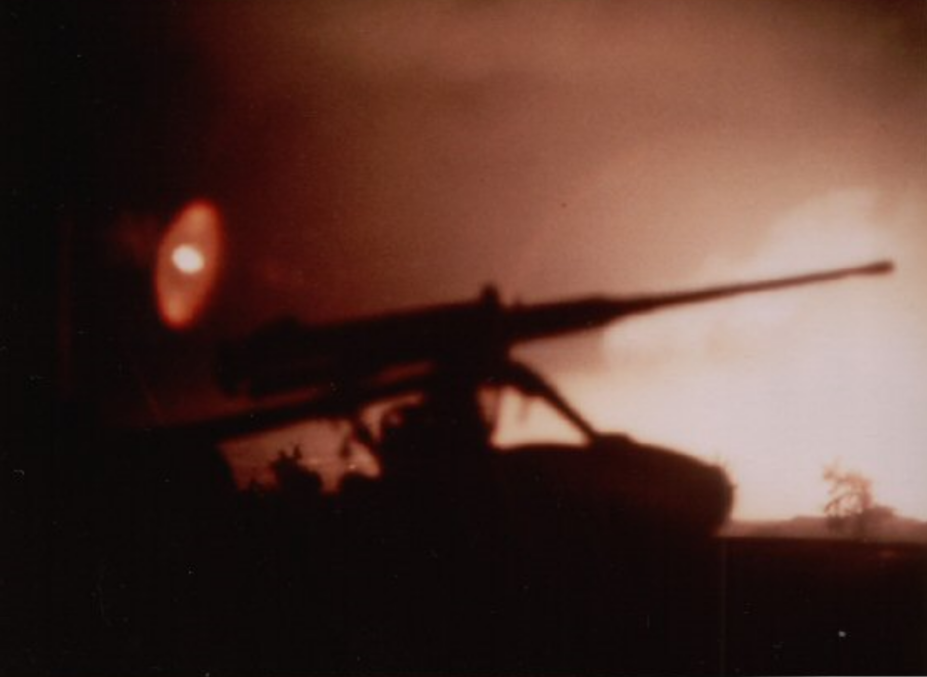
31 January 1968. Start of Tet Offensive as seen from LZ Betty's water tower, Quang Tri.

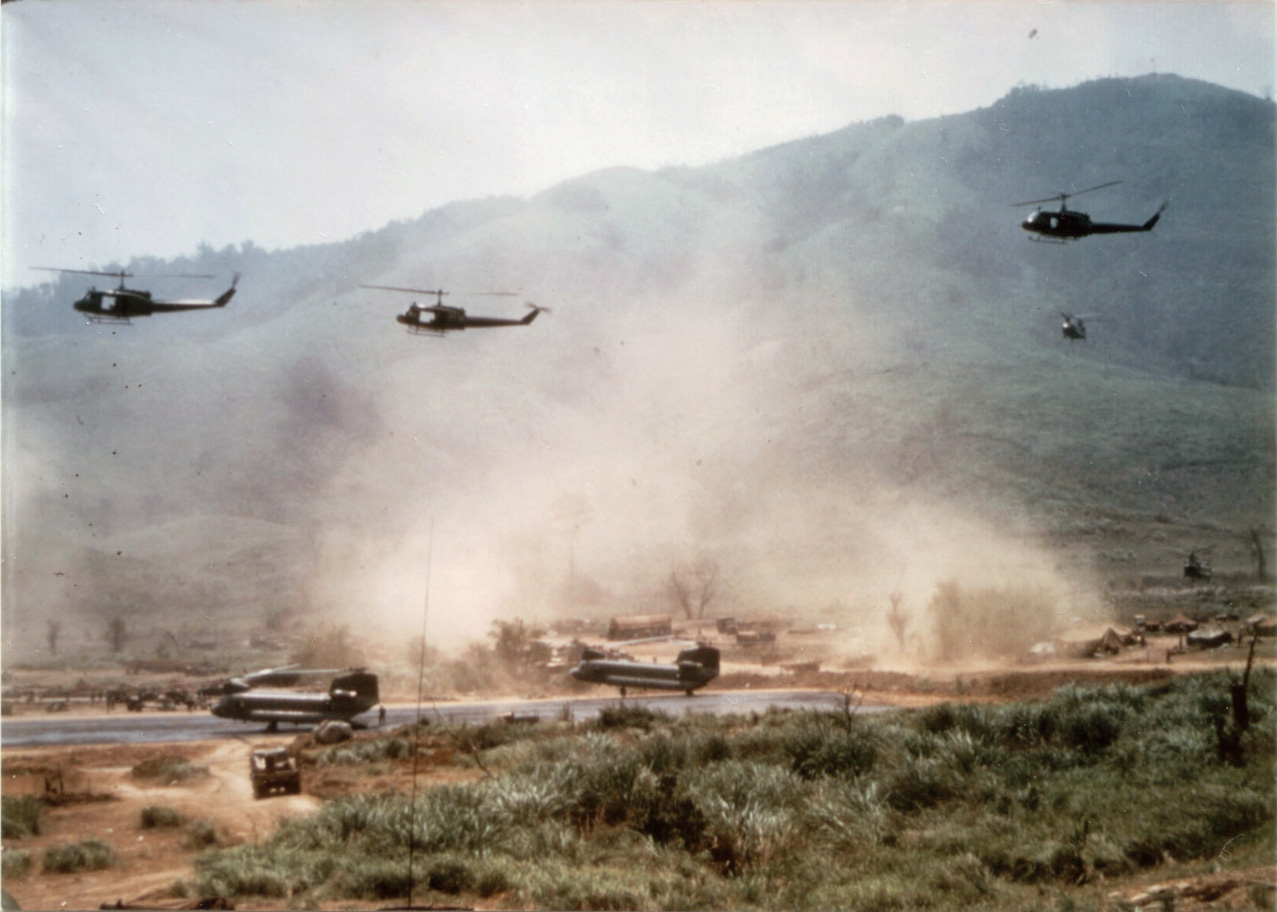
4 April 1968. 1st Cav forces at LZ Stud, the staging area for Operation Pegasus.

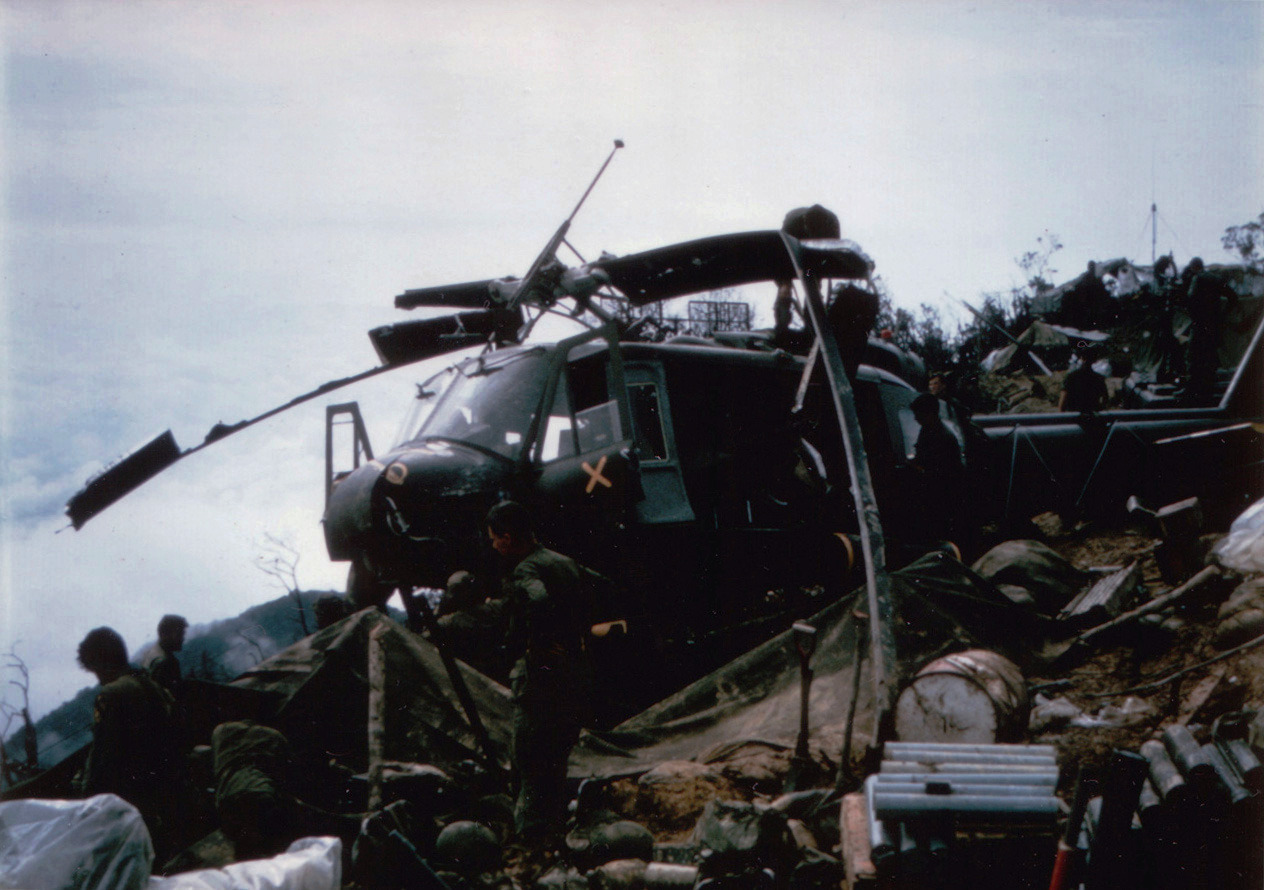
26 April 1968. Operation Delaware, second crashed helicopter on Signal Hill, A Shau Valley.

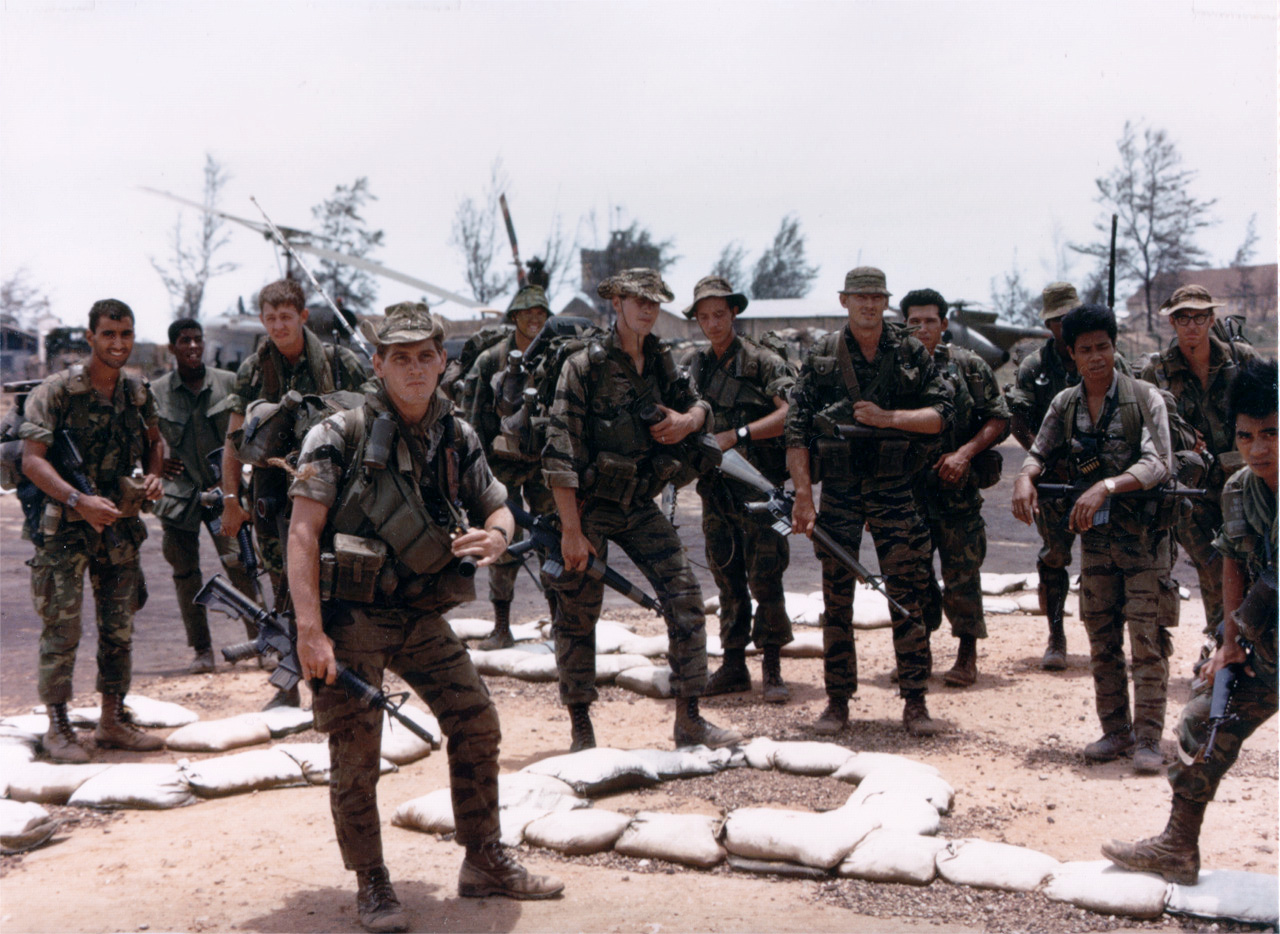
July 1968. Two 1st Cavalry Division LRP teams, Quang Tri.

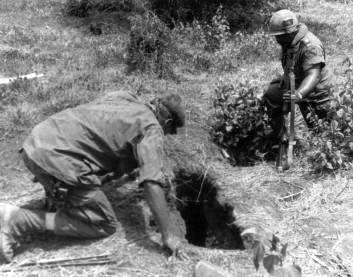
Unknown Date. Tunnel rat preparing for entering Vietnamese Tunnel, Vietnam.

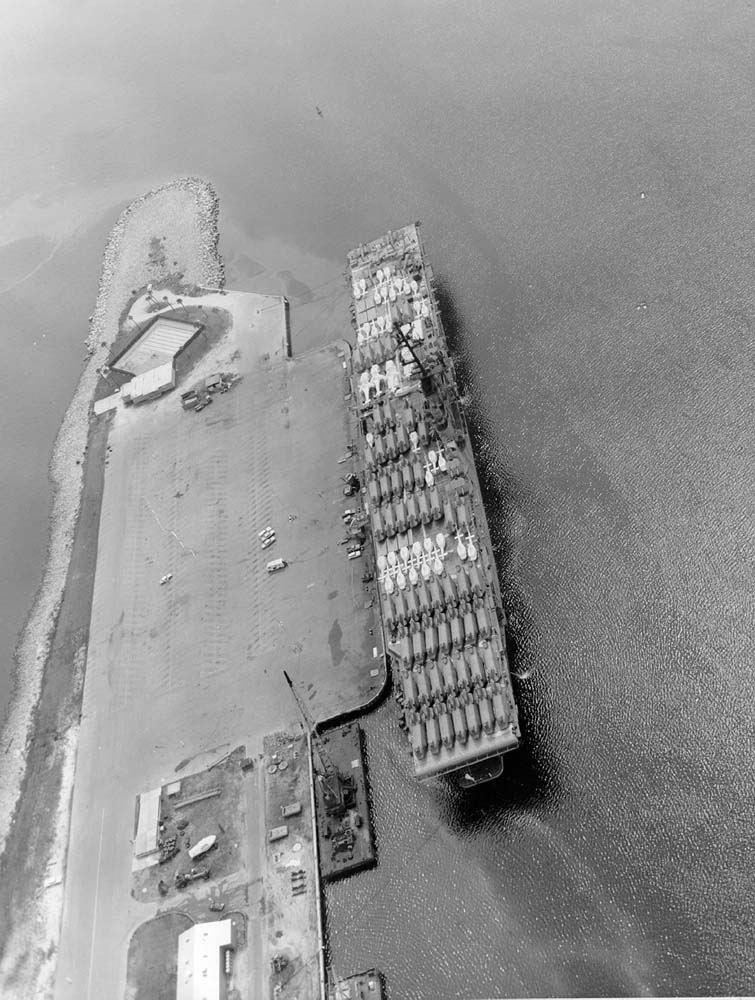
1965. Photo of USS Boxer (CV-21/LPH-4) loaded with helicopters of the 1st Cavalry Division.

The division's first major operation was to help relieve the Siege of Plei Me near Pleiku and the pursuit of the withdrawing People's Army of Vietnam (PAVN) which culminated in the Battle of Ia Drang, described in the book We Were Soldiers Once...And Young, was also the basis of the film We Were Soldiers. Because of that battle the division earned the Presidential Unit Citation (US), the first unit to receive such in the war. In 1966, the division attempted to root the communist Viet Cong (VC) and PAVN out of Bình Định Province with Operation Masher, Operation Crazy Horse and Operation Thayer. 1967 was then spent conducting Operation Pershing, a large scale search and destroy operation of PAVN/VC base areas in II Corps in which 5,400 PAVN/VC soldiers were killed and 2,000 captured. In Operation Jeb Stuart, January 1968, the division moved north to Camp Evans, north of Hue and on to Landing Zones Sharon and Betty, south of Quang Tri City, all in the I Corps Tactical Zone.

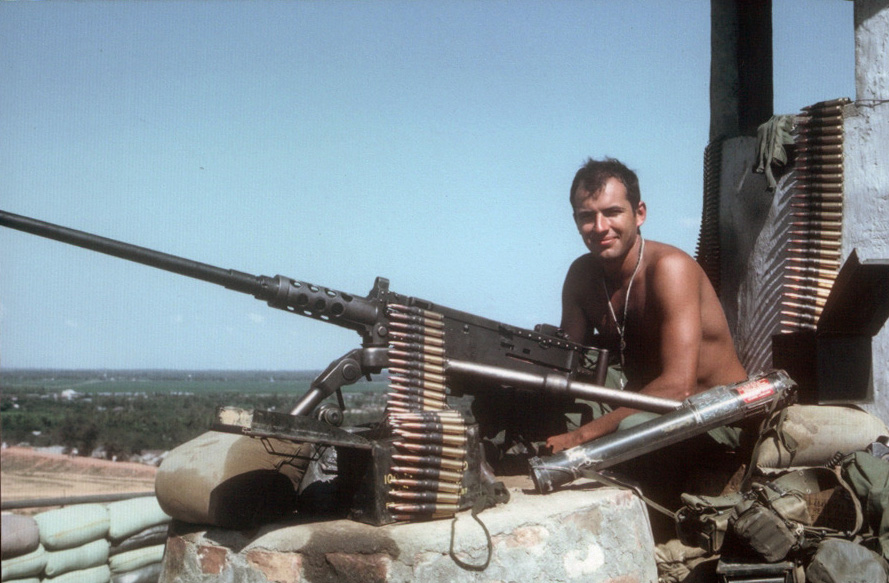
27 January 1968. 1st Cavalry Division LRP at LZ Betty prelude to Tet.

In the early morning hours of 31 January 1968, the largest battle of the Vietnam War, the Tet Offensive, was launched by 84,000 PAVN/VC soldiers across South Vietnam. In the division's area of operation, the PAVN/VC forces seized most of the city of Huế. As the 3rd Brigade, 1st Cavalry Division, fought to cut off PAVN/VC reinforcements pouring into Huế, at Quảng Trị, five battalions, most from the 324th Division, attacked the city and LZ Betty (Headquarters 1st Brigade). To stop allied troops from intervening, three other PAVN/VC infantry battalions deployed as blocking forces, all supported by a 122mm-rocket battalion and two heavy-weapons companies armed with 82mm mortars and 75mm recoilless rifles. After intense fighting, 900 PAVN/VC soldiers were killed in and around Quảng Trị and LZ Betty. However, across South Vietnam, 1,000 Americans, 2,100 South Vietnamese, 14,000 civilians, and 32,000 PAVN/VC were killed.

In March 1968 the division shifted forces to LZ Stud, the staging area for Operation Pegasus to break the siege of the Marine's Khe Sanh Combat Base—the second largest battle of the war. All three brigades participated in this airmobile operation, along with a Marine armor thrust. US Air Force B-52s alone dropped more than 75,000 tons of bombs on PAVN soldiers from the 304th and 325th Divisions encroaching the combat base in trenches. As these two elite enemy divisions, with history at Dien Bien Phu and the Ia Drang Valley, depleted, the division leapfrogged west, clearing Route 9, until at 0:800 hours 8 April, the 2nd Battalion, 7th Cavalry, linked-up with Marines at the combat base, ending the 77-day siege.

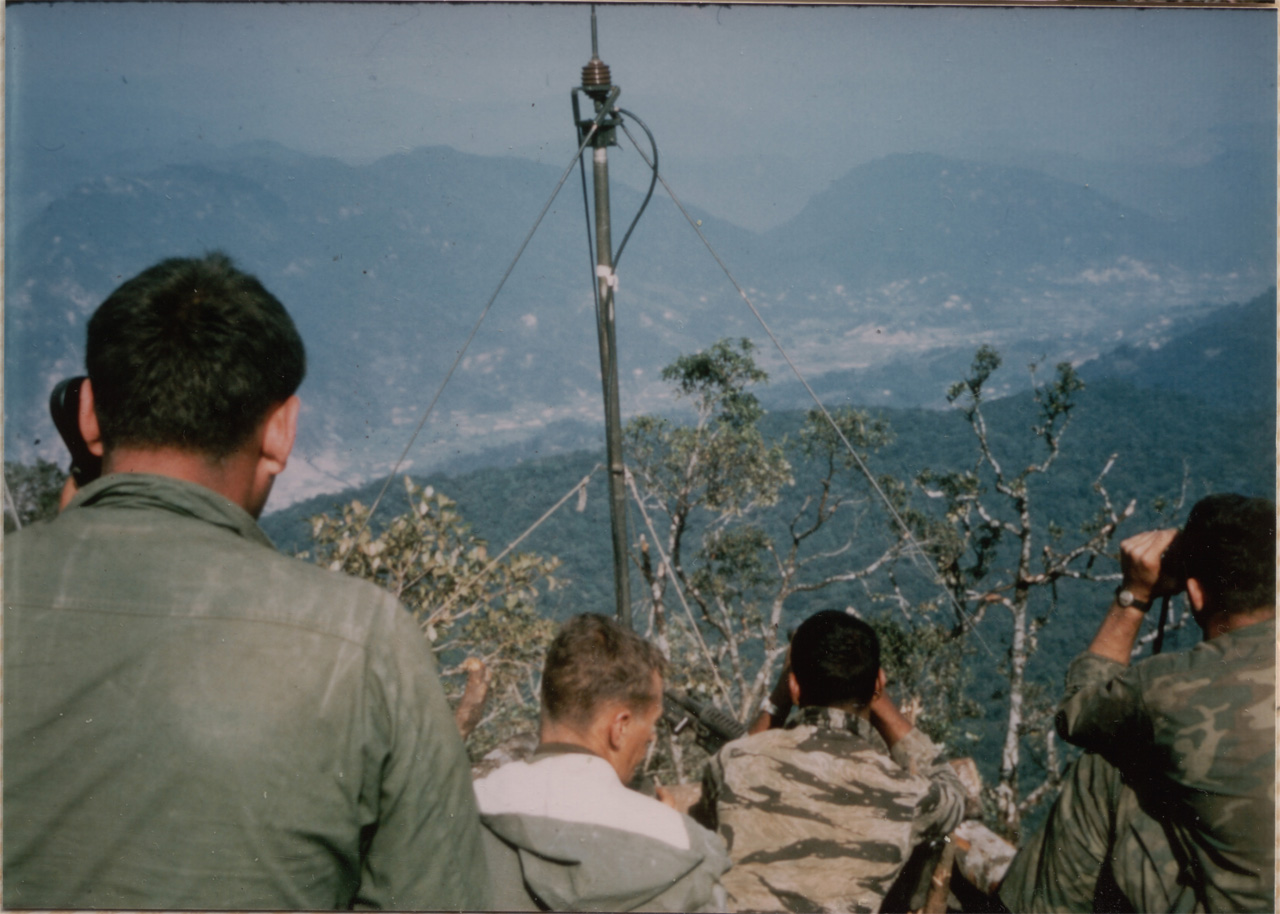
LRPs on Signal Hill directing artillery on enemy trucks in valley.

On 19 April 1968, as the 2nd Brigade continued pushing west to the Laotian border, the 1st and 3rd Brigades (about 11,000 men and 300 helicopters) swung southwest and air assaulted A Shau Valley, commencing Operation Delaware. The PAVN was a well-trained, equipped, and led force. They turned A Shau into a formidable sanctuary —complete with PT-76 tanks; powerful crew-served 37mm antiaircraft cannons, some radar controlled; twin-barreled 23mm cannons; and scores of 12.7mm heavy machine guns. A long-range penetration operation was launched by members of the Division's long-range reconnaissance patrol (LRP) against the PAVN when they seized "Signal Hill"—the name attributed to the peak of Dong Re Lao Mountain, a densely forested 4,879 feet (1,487 m) mountain midway in the valley—so the 1st and 3rd Brigades, slugging it out hidden deep behind the mountains, could communicate with Camp Evans near the coast or with approaching aircraft.

Despite hundreds of B-52 and jet air strikes, the PAVN forces shot down a C-130, a CH-54, two CH-47s and nearly two dozen UH-1s. Many more were lost in accidents or damaged by ground fire. The division also suffered more than 100 dead and 530 wounded in the operation. Bad weather aggravated the loss by causing delays in troop movements, allowing a substantial number of PAVN to escape to safety in Laos. Still, the PAVN lost more than 800 dead, a tank, 70 trucks, two bulldozers, 30 flamethrowers, thousands of rifles and machine guns, and dozens of antiaircraft cannons. They also lost tons of ammunition, explosives, medical supplies and foodstuffs.

In mid-May 1968 Operation Delaware ended, however, the division continued tactical operations in I Corps as well as local pacification and "medcap" (medical outreach programs to local Vietnamese). In the autumn of 1968, the division relocated south to Phước Vĩnh Base Camp northeast of Saigon, at the III Corps Tactical Zone. In May 1970, the division participated in the Cambodian Incursion, withdrawing from Cambodia on 29 June. Thereafter, the division took a defensive posture while US troops withdrawals continued from Vietnam. On 29 April 1971 the bulk of the division was withdrawn to Fort Hood, Texas, but its 3rd Brigade remained as one of the final two major US ground combat units in Vietnam, departing 29 June 1972. However, its 1st Battalion, 7th Cavalry, Task Force Garry Owen, remained another two months.

In the Vietnam War, the division suffered more casualties than any other U.S. Army division: 5,444 men killed in action and 26,592 wounded in action.

=== Cold War ===
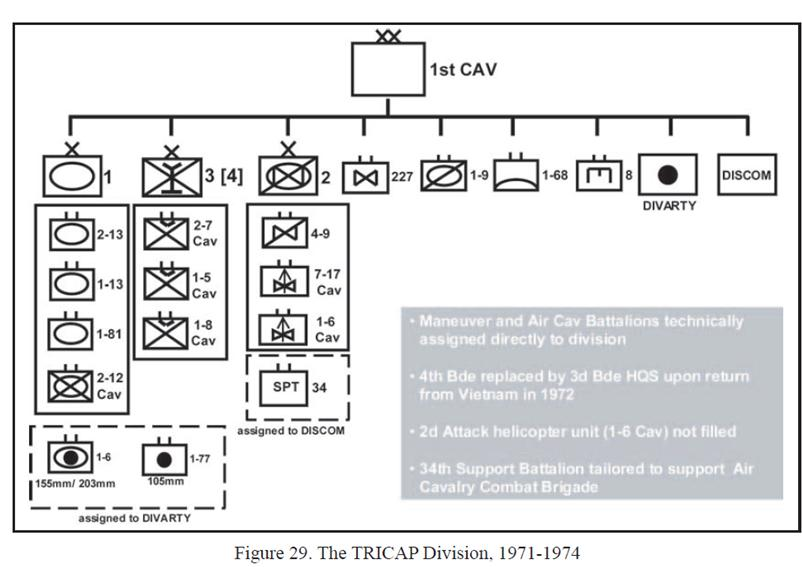
1971–1974 Organization of the 1st Cavalry Division (TRICAP)

When the 1st Cavalry Division (Airmobile) departed Vietnam, its colors were retained by reflagging the existing 1st Armored Division at Fort Hood as the "new" 1st Cavalry Division, configured as an armored division. Concurrently, the colors of the 1st Armored Division were transferred to Germany where the 4th Armored Division was reflagged as the 1st Armored Division.

In the aftermath of Vietnam, the 1st Cavalry Division was converted from an airmobile light infantry role into a triple capabilities (TRICAP) division. The unit received an infusion of mechanized infantry and artillery, to make it capable of missions needing three types of troops; armored, airmobility and air cavalry.

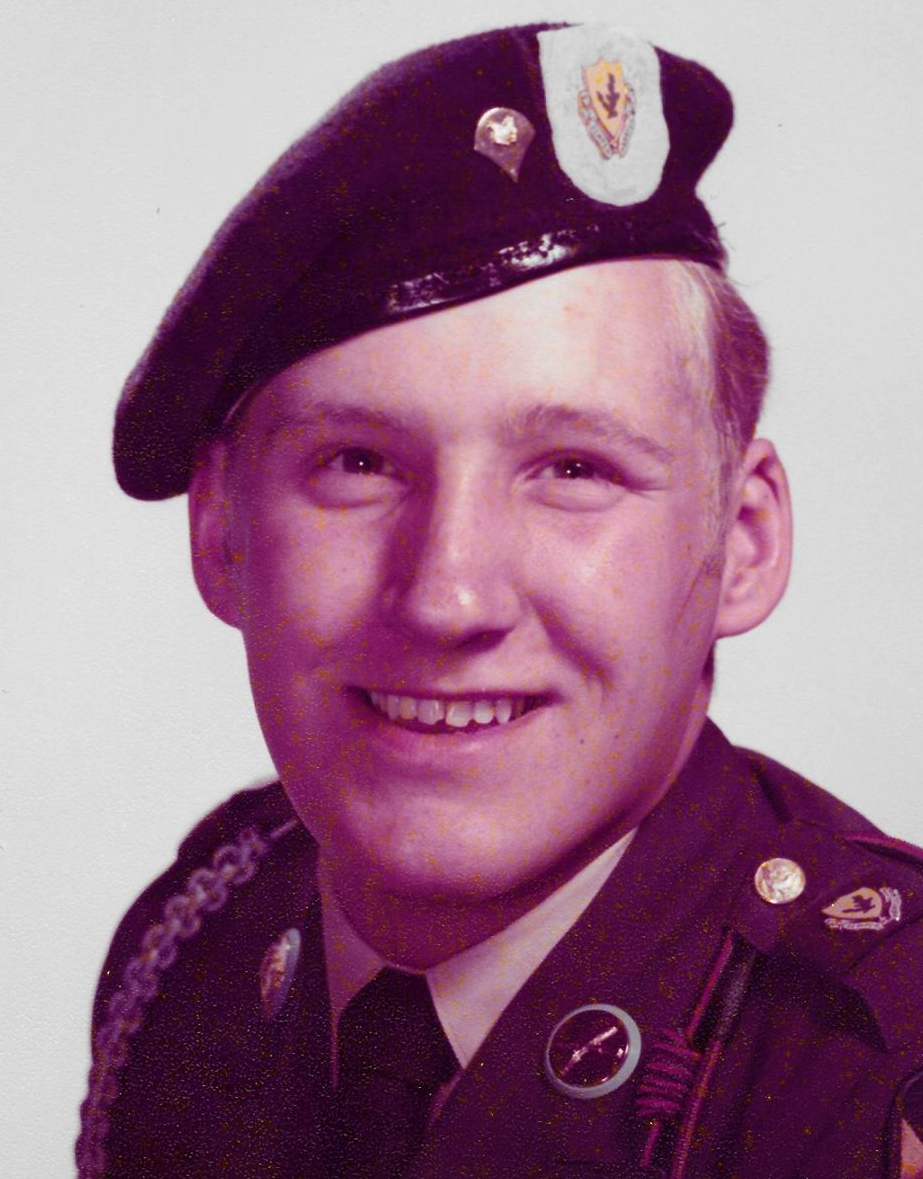
An infantryman with 1st Cavalry Division, 1st Brigade, 1st Battalion, 12th Cavalry wearing black beret, 1976

In the post-Vietnam era, morale in the US Army waned. In response, the Department of the Army released a morale–enhancing order in 1973 permitting local commanders to encourage morale-enhancing uniform distinctions. Consequently, many units embraced the wear of various military berets. The 1st Cavalry Division's use of various colored berets started in 1971 with the TRICAP experiment: black for armor, light–blue for infantry, red for artillery, and kelly–green for support. The division eventually settled on the use of black berets for all 1st Cavalry soldiers and continued wearing them until the Army's morale enhancing order ended in 1979.

However, the TRICAP concept was short-lived, and by 1975, the division was reorganized under the Round-Out Division concept, with two active duty armored brigades and one National Guard armored brigade - the Mississippi Army National Guard's 155th Armored Brigade from 1984 to 1991.

The division participated in numerous REFORGER exercises, and was used to test new doctrinal concepts and equipment, including the XM-1 tank. The unit assignment and structure changed significantly, notably when 1st Battalion, 9th Cavalry was inactivated. The 13th Signal Battalion fielded mobile subscriber equipment (MSE), a secure digital communications system for corps and below units.

==== Division organization 1989 ====
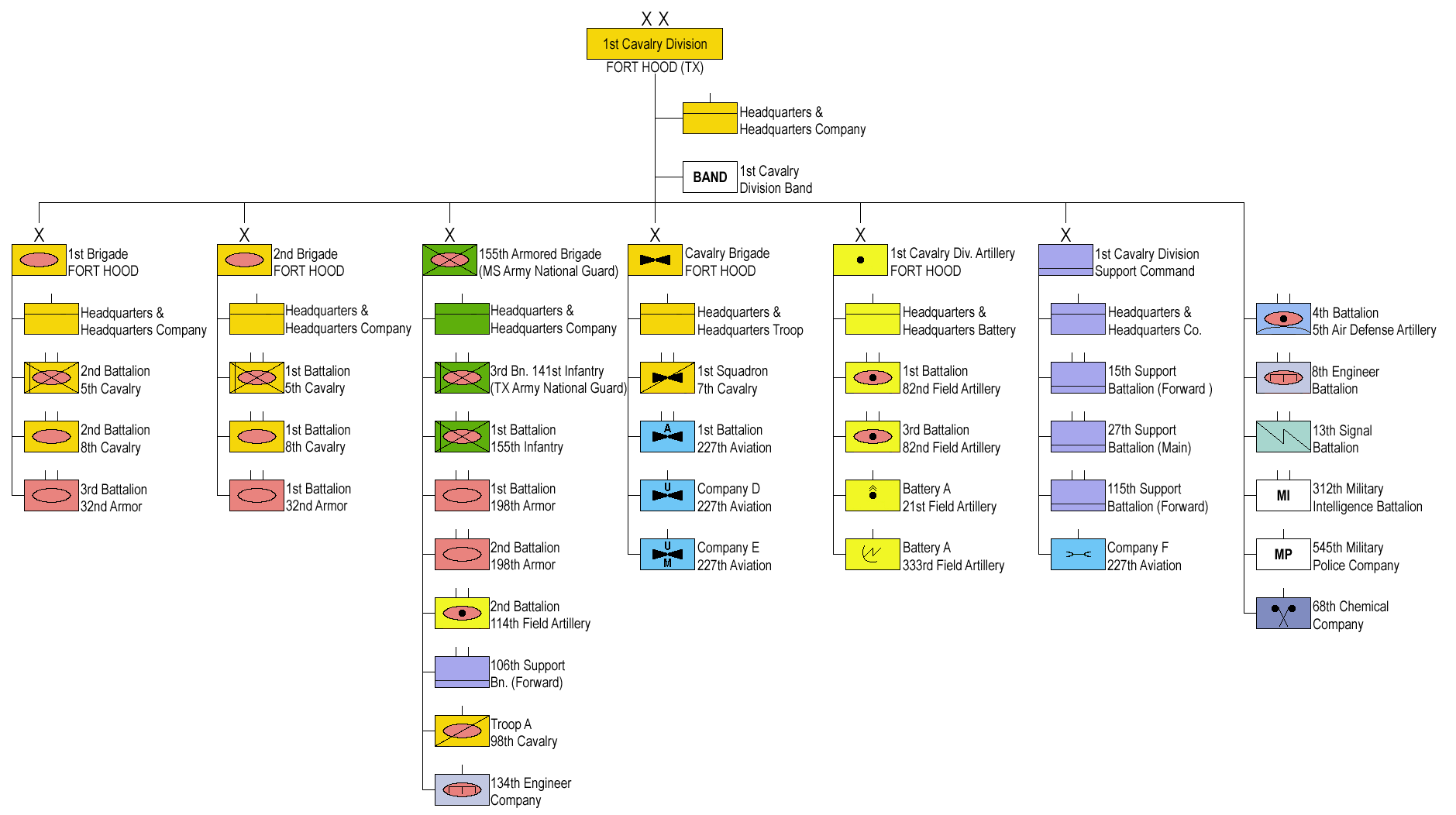
1st Cavalry Division organization 1989 (click to enlarge)

- 1st Cavalry Division, Fort Hood (Texas) (Operation Reforger unit. POMCUS materiel depots in Belgium (Grobbendonk, Zutendaal) and the Netherlands (Brunssum, Eygelshoven) and ammunition depot in Zutendaal)
  - Headquarters and Headquarters Company
  - 1st Cavalry Division Band
  - 1st Cavalry Horse Detachment
  - 1st Brigade
    - Headquarters and Headquarters Company
    - 2nd Battalion, 5th Cavalry (Mechanized)
    - 2nd Battalion, 8th Cavalry
    - 3rd Battalion, 32nd Armor
  - 2nd Brigade
    - Headquarters and Headquarters Troop
    - 1st Battalion, 5th Cavalry (Mechanized)
    - 1st Battalion, 8th Cavalry
    - 1st Battalion, 32nd Armor
  - 155th Armored Brigade, Tupelo (Mississippi Army National Guard)
    - Headquarters and Headquarters Company
    - 3rd Battalion, 141st Infantry (Mechanized), McAllen (Texas Army National Guard)
    - 1st Battalion, 155th Infantry (Mechanized), McComb
    - 1st Battalion, 198th Armor, Amory
    - 2nd Battalion, 198th Armor, Greenville
    - 2nd Battalion, 114th Field Artillery, Starkville (24 × M109A3)
    - 106th Support Battalion (Forward), Monticello
    - Troop A, 98th Cavalry, Louisville (19 × M3 Bradley, 3 × M106A2)
    - 134th Engineer Company
  - Cavalry Brigade
    - Headquarters and Headquarters Troop
    - 1st Squadron, 7th Cavalry (Reconnaissance) (Troop B (Ground) inactive) (21 × M3 Bradley, 3 × M106A2, 8 × AH-1S Cobra, 12 × OH-58C Kiowa, 1 × UH-60A Black Hawk)
    - 1st Battalion, 227th Aviation (Attack) (18 × AH-64 Apache, 13 × OH-58D Kiowa, 3 × UH-60A Black Hawk)
    - Company D, 227th Aviation (Command Support) (12 × OH-58C, 6 × UH-1H, 3 × EH-60A)
    - Company E, 227th Aviation (Assault) (15 × UH-60A Black Hawk)
  - Division Artillery (DIVARTY)
    - Headquarters and Headquarters Battery
    - 1st Battalion, 82nd Field Artillery (24 × M109A3)
    - 3rd Battalion, 82nd Field Artillery (24 × M109A3)
    - Battery A, 21st Field Artillery (9 × M270 MLRS)
    - Battery A, 333rd Field Artillery (Target Acquisition)
  - Division Support Command (DISCOM)
    - Headquarters and Headquarters Company
    - 15th Support Battalion (Forward)
    - 27th Support Battalion (Main)
    - 115th Support Battalion (Forward)
    - Company F, 227th Aviation (Aviation Intermediate Maintenance)
  - 4th Battalion, 5th Air Defense Artillery (assigned 16 November 1988)
  - 8th Engineer Battalion
  - 13th Signal Battalion
  - 312th Military Intelligence Battalion (Combat Electronic Warfare & Intelligence)
  - 545th Military Police Company
  - 68th Chemical Company

By October 1986 all heavy army and national guard divisions, including the 1st Cavalry Division, had transitioned to the Army of Excellence J-series TOE. The 1st Cavalry Division's 4th Battalion, 5th Air Defense Artillery was the first unit to field the AN/TWQ-1 Avenger system, with training underway in 1990.

=== Gulf War ===
Battle plan for the first Gulf War, with the 1st Cavalry Division attacking through the center of the main force.

The 1st Cavalry next fought as a heavy division, during Operation Desert Storm in January and February 1991. It participated in the Battle of Norfolk. The 1st Cavalry Division deployed in October 1990 as part of XVIII Corps. The division's 'round-out' formation, the 155th Armored Brigade was not deployed. It was planned to augment the division by attaching the Tiger Brigade from the 2nd Armored Division, but that brigade was attached to the 1st Marine Expeditionary Force (1st & 2nd Marine Divisions) to add heavy armor support to that force. Consequently, the 1st Cavalry Division was assigned the role of CENTCOM's reserve. During the Ground war, was assigned to VII Corps and was crucial in the movement of ground forces to the Kuwaiti and west Saudi Arabian theaters by making two assaults into Iraqi held territory with the division's Black Jack Brigade moving north drawing Iraqi divisions out of Kuwait to support the Iraqi units defending in Iraq. This movement was led by the 1st Battalion, 5th Cavalry, from the Wadi Al-Batin to just north of Basra through several Iraqi divisions before stopping. The assault by M1 Abrams main battle tanks, M2 Bradley infantry fighting vehicles, and other support vehicles moved much faster than was thought possible, catching the Iraqi Army off guard.

The 13th Signal Battalion was the first unit in the U.S. Army to deploy mobile subscriber equipment (MSE) into combat. Installing, operating, and maintaining communications equipment to support a communications network spanning over 280 kilometers, the 13th Signal Battalion again provided the division's communications. The 13th Signal Battalion was the first unit in the U.S. Army to provide digital communications in West Asia. It was a gateway link from the Port of Dammam to the U.S. Army XVIII Airborne Corps Headquarters.

After the division returned from Kuwait, the 1st "Tiger" Brigade, 2nd Armored Division was reflagged as the 3rd Brigade, 1st Cavalry Division (separate lineage). In response to the continued hostile movements by the Iraqi Armed Forces after Desert Storm, the U.S. Department of Defense ordered successive Operation Intrinsic Action deployments by combat brigades and special forces units to the Iraq/Kuwait border. The 1st Cavalry's three brigades contributed heavily to the decade-long deployments from 1992 to 2002.

=== Bosnia-Herzegovina ===
The 1st Cavalry Division took control of the U.S. peacekeeping contingent in Bosnia-Herzegovina with approximately 6,900 personnel on 20 June 1998, as part of the multinational Stabilization Force (SFOR). The 1st Brigade served for Rotation SFOR 4. 2nd Brigade served for Rotation SFOR 5. The 2nd Brigade was alerted for action during the Russian move from Bosnia to the Pristina International Airport in June 1999, but no action was ultimately taken after consultation at the highest levels in NATO. In August 1999, the 10th Mountain Division took over operations in the Tuzla/Multinational Division North area.

=== War on terror ===
Elements of the division arrived in Washington, D.C., shortly after the 11 September attacks.

==== Iraq War ====
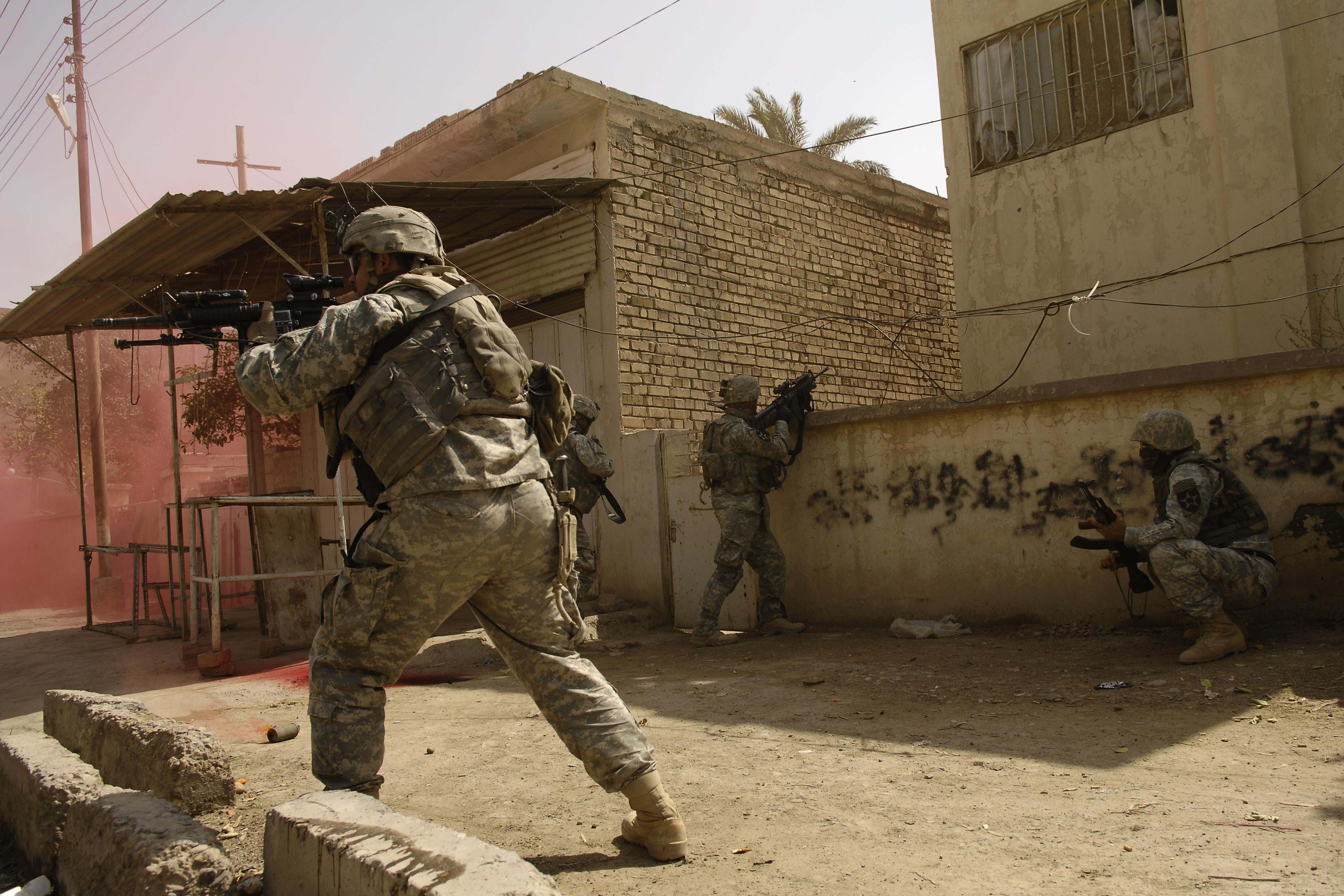
Soldiers from the 1st Cavalry Division engaging insurgents in the Battle of Baqubah, 14 March 2007.

In October 2001 an advance party of a division brigade combat team was deployed to the Iraq/Kuwait border. Some divisional units participated in the initial 2003 invasion of Iraq. The division in its entirety deployed to Iraq in January 2004, sending an initial detachment of the 9th Cavalry Regiment into combat in September 2003. The 1st Cavalry relieved the 1st Armored Division in Baghdad. Among its subordinate formations were: Louisiana's 256th Infantry Brigade; Arkansas' 39th Infantry Brigade; element of A Company, 28th Signal Battalion; elements of Washington's 81st Armored Brigade; and the 2d Battalion, 162nd Infantry (Oregon Army National Guard), and Company E (Air Traffic Control Services), 126th Aviation, MA ARNG. After spending more than a year in Iraq, it redeployed back to the US by April 2005. It was relieved by the 3rd Infantry Division. Division Artillery (DIVARTY) was organized as the 5th BCT. It contained HHB, DIVARTY; 1–7 CAV; 1–8 CAV; 1–21 FA; and the 515th FSB (Provisional). The division fought in many key battles against insurgents, including the Second Battle of Fallujah in 2004, where the 2nd Brigade Combat Team engaged in house-to-house intense urban combat to root out enemy cells in the city. During its OIF2 deployment, the division assigned and attached personnel numbered approximately 40,000. 168 personnel were killed in action, with approximately 1,500 wounded.

The division assumed duties as Headquarters, Multi-National Division – Baghdad from November 2006 to December 2007. 4th Brigade Combat Team, activated in 2005, arrived in Ninawa Governorate in October and November 2006. However, 2–12 Cavalry was detached, deployed to Baghdad to augment the division efforts there.

The 3d Brigade Combat Team, "Greywolf", deployed to the Diyala Province in September 2006 and fought in the Battle of Baqubah as a part of the Iraq War troop surge of 2007.

The division assumed duties as the Headquarters, Multi-National Division – Baghdad Jan 2009– Jan 2010. The deployment was extended by 23 days past the one year mark.

The 4th Brigade Combat Team "Long Knife" deployed to Mosul, Nineva Province, October 2006 to January 2008 and again September 2010 to September 2011.

==== Afghanistan (2001–2014) ====
In November 2001, elements of the 1st Cavalry Division (3d Platoon, 545th MP CO, originally assigned to 2d Brigade "BlackJack" 1st Cav) deployed to Bagram Airfield, Afghanistan as part of Operation Enduring Freedom – Afghanistan.

In May 2011, the division headquarters deployed in support of Operation Enduring Freedom and assumed command of Regional Command East, replacing the 101st Airborne Division (Air Assault). The 1st Infantry Division HQ took command of RC-East on 19 April 2012.

In June 2014, the division headquarters returned to Afghanistan and assumed command of Regional Command South, replacing the 4th Infantry Division.

In October 2014, the division flag returned to Fort Hood, leaving its Deputy Commanding General behind as the new Train Advise Assist Command South.

Operation Enduring Freedom – Afghanistan (OEF-A) ended in late 2014.

==== Operation Freedom's Sentinel (2015–2021) ====
After the completion of Operation Enduring Freedom – Afghanistan, the new US deployment to Afghanistan was known as Operation Freedom's Sentinel.

In June 2015, the division element in TAAC South was relieved by an element from the 7th Infantry Division Headquarters.

In September 2016, the 1st Cavalry Division Headquarters deployed again to Afghanistan, this time with the 1st Cavalry Division Sustainment Brigade alongside it. The headquarters served as the United States Forces – Afghanistan National Support Element, and was also responsible for Bagram Airfield, the largest US military base in Afghanistan. It supported forces serving in the United States' Operation Freedom's Sentinel and NATO's Resolute Support Mission, enabling both the international effort to train, advise, and assist the Afghan National Defense and Security Forces and the counterterrorism fight. The 1st Cavalry Division Sustainment Brigade also supported both Operation Freedom's Sentinel and Resolute Support and was the Army's only deployed active duty Sustainment Brigade until US forces withdrew in 2021.

==== Operation Inherent Resolve ====
The division's 3d BCT deployed in February 2017 to Kuwait, and elements of 3ABCT supported operations in Iraq to retake Mosul from ISIS.

==== Global missions ====
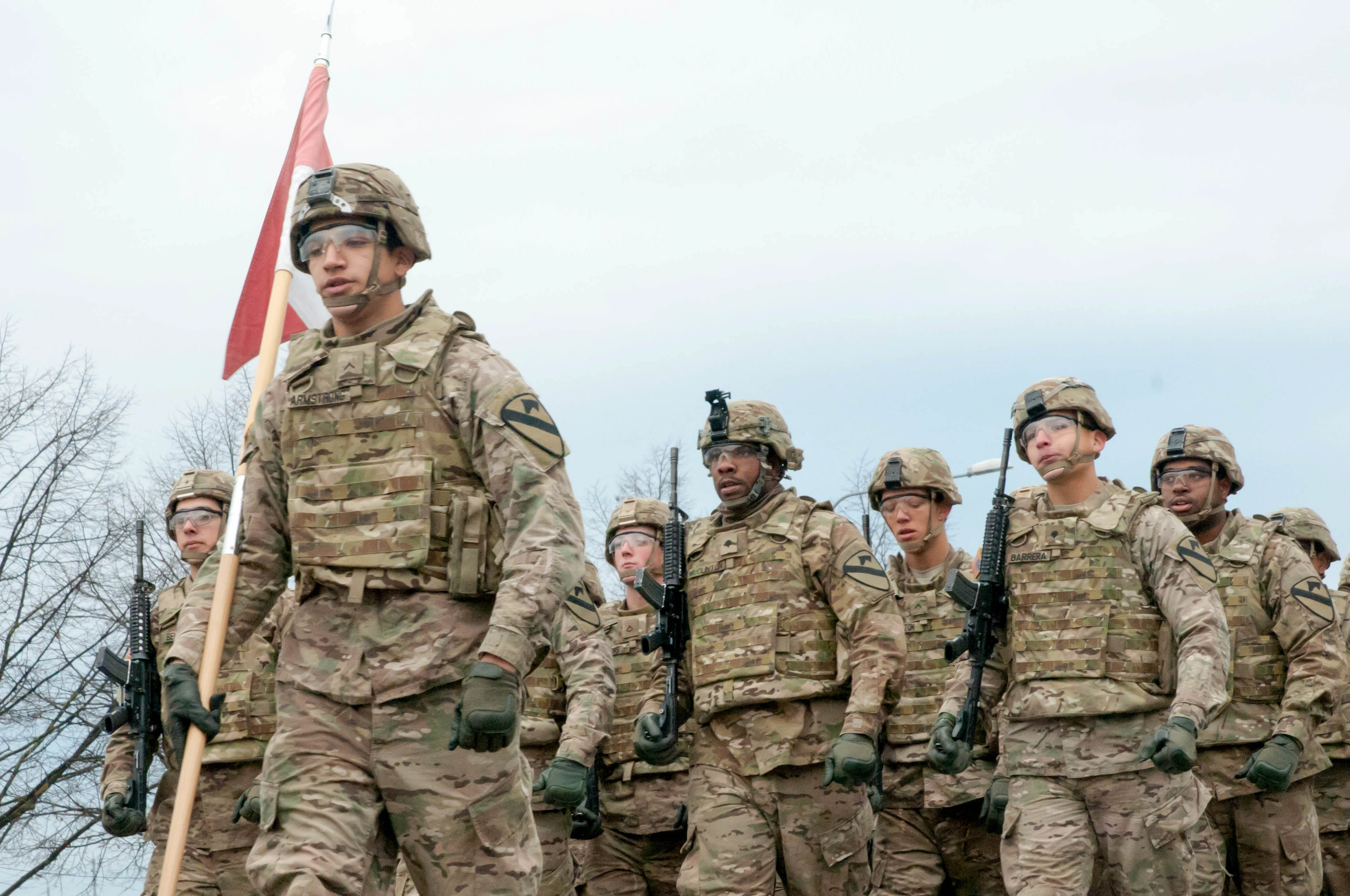
Soldiers of 2nd Battalion, 8th Cavalry Regiment, 1st Brigade Combat Team, 1st Cavalry Division during the 2014 Latvia Day Parade in Riga, Latvia during Operation Atlantic Resolve.

The 1st Cavalry Division currently holds three of the active Army's ten armored brigade combat teams. The division provides the Army and Combatant Commanders with trained and ready forces.

In April 2014, 2–5 Cavalry from 1st BCT, 1CD deployed to Europe to support Operation Combined Resolve II, a NATO exercise in southeastern Germany. In October 2014, 1CD returned to Europe to support its NATO partners in another pair of exercises, this time participating in Operations Combined Resolve III and Atlantic Resolve with the majority of 1ABCT.

A battalion task force from the Combat Aviation Brigade, 1st Cavalry Division deployed to Germany in November 2015; it participated in Atlantic Resolve, then stayed in Germany for the next nine months to provide aviation support to US and NATO forces across Europe.

In June 2015, the 2d BCT was the first rotational brigade deployed to South Korea, relieving the 1st BCT, 2nd Infantry Division as it inactivated. The 2d BCT deployed for nine months; in February 2016, the 2d BCT was replaced by the 1st BCT on another nine-month rotation.

== Division organization ==
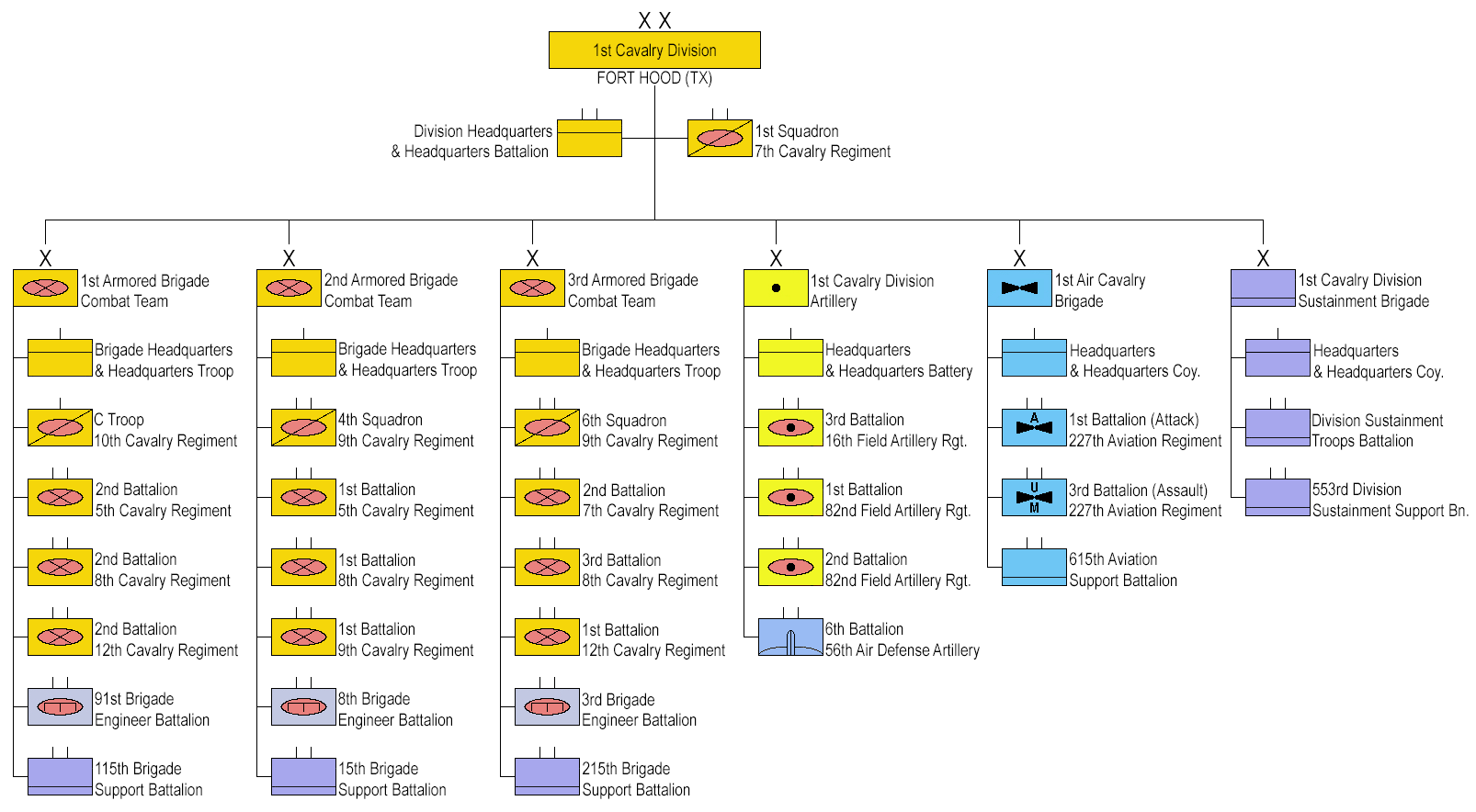
1st Cavalry Division organization as of October 2026

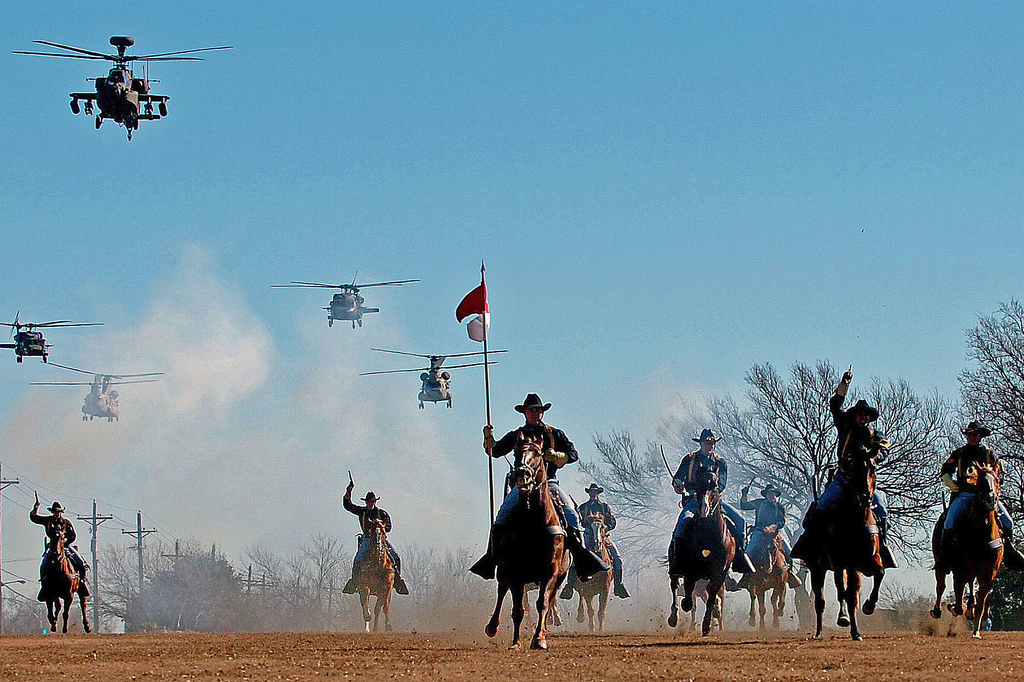
The 1st Cavalry Division's Combat Aviation Brigade performs a mock charge with the horse detachment.

The 1st Cavalry Division consists of a division headquarters and headquarters battalion, three armored brigade combat teams, a division artillery, a combat aviation brigade, and a division sustainment brigade.

- 1st Cavalry Division, Fort Hood, Texas
  - Division Headquarters and Headquarters Battalion "Maverick"
    - Headquarters Support Company
    - Signal, Intelligence & Sustainment Company
    - Horse Cavalry Detachment
    - 1st Cavalry Division Band
  - 1st Squadron, 7th Cavalry Regiment "Garryowen"
  - 1st Brigade Combat Team "Ironhorse"
    - Headquarters and Headquarters Troop, 1st Brigade Combat Team
    - 2nd Battalion, 5th Cavalry Regiment "Lancers"
    - 2nd Battalion, 8th Cavalry Regiment "Stallions"
    - 2nd Battalion, 12th Cavalry Regiment "Thunder Horse"
    - C Troop,10th Cavalry Regiment (Armored Reconnaissance and Security Troop) "Cowboy"
    - 91st Brigade Engineer Battalion "Sabers"
    - 115th Brigade Support Battalion "Muleskinners"
  - 2nd Brigade Combat Team "Black Jack"
    - Headquarters and Headquarters Troop, 2nd Brigade Combat Team
    - 4th Squadron, 9th Cavalry Regiment Reconnaissance Surveillance and Target Acquisition "Dark Horse"
    - 1st Battalion, 5th Cavalry Regiment "Black Knights"
    - 1st Battalion, 8th Cavalry Regiment "Jumping Mustangs"
    - 1st Battalion, 9th Cavalry Regiment "Head Hunters"
    - 8th Brigade Engineer Battalion "Trojan Horse"
    - 15th Brigade Support Battalion "Gambler"
  - 3rd Brigade Combat Team "Greywolf"
    - Headquarters and Headquarters Troop, 3rd Brigade Combat Team
    - 6th Squadron, 9th Cavalry Regiment Reconnaissance Surveillance and Target Acquisition "Saber"
    - 2nd Battalion, 7th Cavalry Regiment "Ghost"
    - 3rd Battalion, 8th Cavalry Regiment "Warhorse"
    - 1st Battalion, 12th Cavalry Regiment "Chargers"
    - 3rd Brigade Engineer Battalion "Beavers"
    - 215th Brigade Support Battalion "Blacksmiths"
  - 3rd Cavalry Regiment "Brave Rifles"
    - 1st Squadron; 3rd Cavalry Regiment "Tiger"
    - 2nd Squadron; 3rd Cavalry Regiment "Sabre"
    - 3rd Squadron; 3rd Cavalry Regiment "Thunder"
    - Regimental Support Squadron; 3rd Cavalry Regiment "Muleskinner"
  - 1st Cavalry Division Artillery "Red Team"
    - Headquarters and Headquarters Battery,1st Cavalry Division Artillery
    - 3rd Battalion, 16th Field Artillery Regiment "Rolling Thunder"
    - 1st Battalion, 82nd Field Artillery Regiment "Dragons"
    - 2nd Battalion, 82nd Field Artillery Regiment "Steel Dragons"
    - Field Artillery Squadron; 3rd Cavalry Regiment "Steel"
    - 6th Battalion, 56th Air Defense Artillery "Nighthawks"
  - 1st Air Cavalry Brigade "Air Cav"
    - Headquarters and Headquarters Company 1st Air Cavalry Brigade
    - 1st Battalion, 227th Aviation Regiment "First Attack" (Attack, with AH-64E Apache)
    - 3rd Battalion, 227th Aviation Regiment "Spearhead" (Assault, with UH-60M Black Hawk)
    - 615th Aviation Support Battalion "Cold Steel"
  - 1st Cavalry Division Engineer Brigade "Rugged"
    - Headquarters and Headquarters Company 1st Cavalry Division Engineer Brigade
    - 20th Engineer Battalion
    - 62nd Engineer Battalion
  - 1st Cavalry Division Sustainment Brigade "Wagonmasters"
    - Headquarters and Headquarters Company, 1st Cavalry Division Sustainment Brigade
    - Division Sustainment Troops Battalion
      - 120th Quartermaster Company (Field Feeding)
      - 207th Brigade Signal Company
      - 502nd Human Resources Company
    - 553rd Division Sustainment Support Battalion

=== Organization history ===
The 4th Brigade Combat Team "Long Knife" inactivated in October 2013 the following units: the Special Troops Battalion, 4th BCT; the 5th Battalion, 82nd Artillery; and 27th Brigade Support Battalion, with some of the companies of the latter two used to augment artillery and support battalions in the remaining three BCTs. The 1st Squadron, 9th Cavalry joined the 2nd Brigade Combat Team, the 2nd Battalion, 7th Cavalry joined the 3rd Brigade Combat Team and the 2nd Battalion, 12th Cavalry joined the 1st Brigade Combat Team. The 3rd Cavalry Regiment was subordinate to the division from March 2017 to October 2022.

== Division insignia ==
=== Shoulder sleeve insignia ===
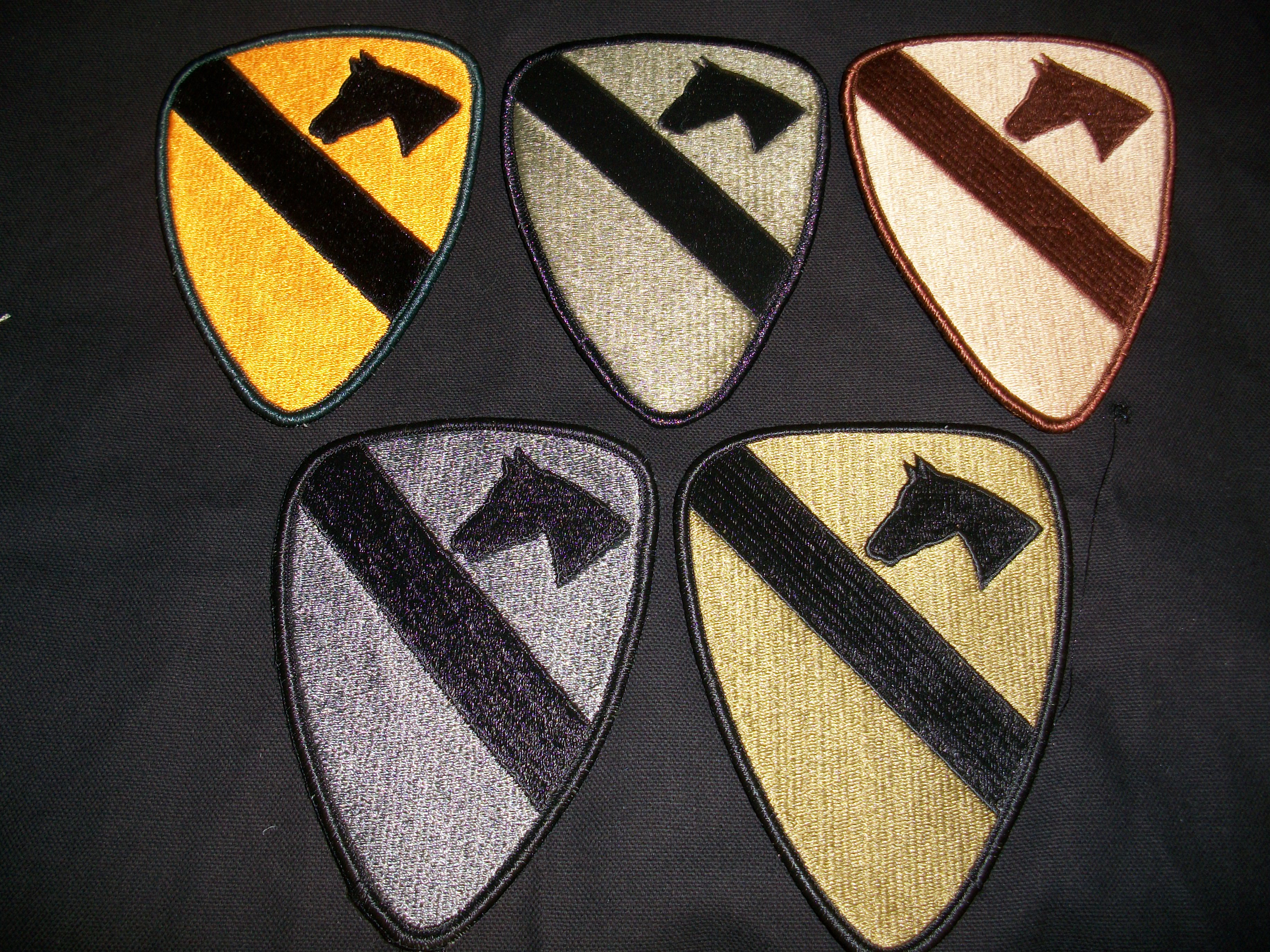
Shoulder Sleeve Insignia: Class A/OG-107, BDU, DCU, UCP, OCP

The shoulder sleeve insignia was originally approved 3 January 1921, with several variations in colors of the bend and horse's head to reflect the subordinate elements of the division. The design was authorized for wear by all subordinate elements of the division on 11 December 1934, and previous authorization for the variations was canceled. The insignia is worn subdued on field uniforms after experience in the Vietnam War, where the gold was too conspicuous. Normally, the gold is changed to the base color of the uniform to subdue it. With the retirement of the green "Class A" uniform in October 2015, only the subdued version of the SSI is worn, on the ACU's left sleeve.

It consists on a yellow, triangular Norman shield with rounded corners 5.25 inches (133 mm) in height overall, a black diagonal stripe extends over the shield from upper left to lower right, and in the upper right a black horse's head cuts off diagonally at the neck, all within a 0.125-in green border.

Yellow was chosen because it is the traditional cavalry color, and the horse's head refer to the division's original cavalry structure. Black, symbolic of iron, alludes to the transition to tanks and armor. The black diagonal stripe represents a sword baldric and is a mark of military honor; it also implies movement "up the field" and thus symbolizes aggressive elan and attack. The one diagonal bend and the one horse's head also allude to the division's numerical designation.

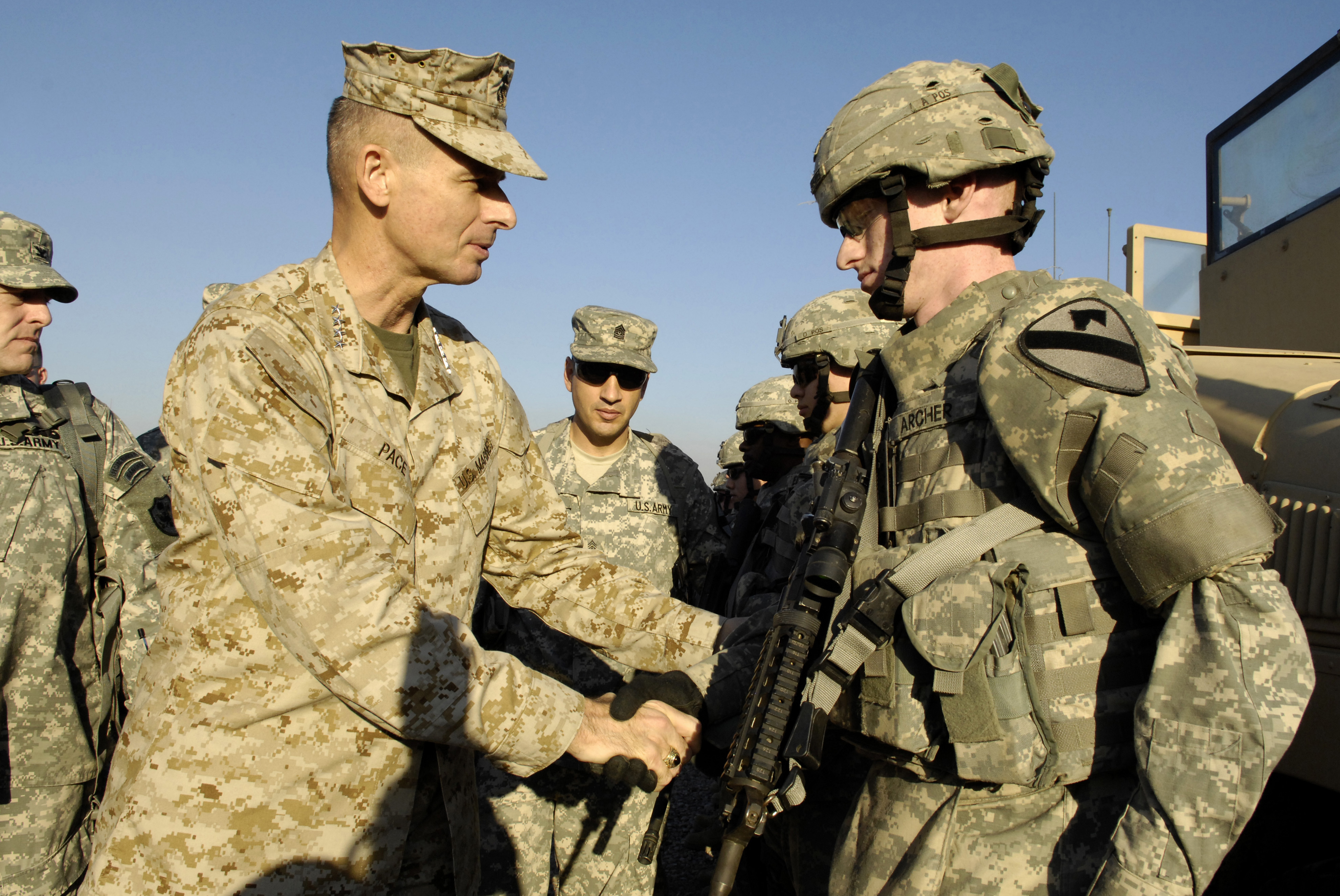
A soldier wearing the SSI of the 1st Cavalry Division speaking with Gen Peter Pace, Chairman of the Joint Chiefs of Staff

=== Distinctive unit insignia ===
Description: A metal and enameled device, 1 inch in height overall, consisting of a gold-colored Norman shield with a black horse's head couped in sinister chief, and a black bend charged with two five-pointed stars. Properly: Or, on a bend sable two stars of five points Or, in chief sinister a sable couped horse head, a border vert

Symbolism: The device is a miniature reproduction of the 1st Cavalry Division's shoulder sleeve insignia with the addition of two five-pointed stars. The Division Commander and the Division Staff wore the distinctive insignia design from 1922 to 1934 as a shoulder sleeve insignia.

Background: The distinctive unit insignia was approved 25 August 1965.

The flag of the 1st Cavalry Division is a white field with the distinctive yellow triangular Norman shield with rounded corners, a black diagonal stripe extending over the shield from upper left to lower right and in the upper right a silhouetted horse's head cut off diagonally at the neck with a green border.

== Awards and decorations ==
=== Campaign credits ===
| Conflict | Streamer | Year(s) |
|---|---|---|
| World War II | New Guinea | 1943 |
| World War II | Bismarck Archipelago | 1943 |
| World War II | Leyte with Arrowhead | 1944 |
| World War II | Luzon | 1944 |
| Korean War | UN Defensive | 1950 |
| Korean War | UN Offensive | 1950 |
| Korean War | CCF Intervention | 1950–1951 |
| Korean War | First UN Counteroffensive | 1951 |
| Korean War | CCF Spring Offensive | 1951 |
| Korean War | UN Summer–Fall Offensive | 1951 |
| Korean War | Second Korean Winter | 1951–1952 |
| Vietnam War | Defense | 1965 |
| Vietnam War | Counteroffensive | 1965–1966 |
| Vietnam War | Counteroffensive, Phase II | 1966–1967 |
| Vietnam War | Counteroffensive, Phase III | 1967–1968 |
| Vietnam War | Tet Counteroffensive | 1968 |
| Vietnam War | Counteroffensive, Phase IV | 1968 |
| Vietnam War | Counteroffensive, Phase V | 1968 |
| Vietnam War | Counteroffensive, Phase VI | 1968–1969 |
| Vietnam War | Tet 69/Counteroffensive | 1969 |
| Vietnam War | Summer–Fall 1969 | 1969 |
| Vietnam War | Winter–Spring 1970 | 1969–1970 |
| Vietnam War | Sanctuary Counteroffensive | 1970 |
| Vietnam War | Counteroffensive, Phase VII | 1970–1971 |
| Vietnam War | Consolidation I (Note: 3rd Brigade only) | 1971 |
| Vietnam War | Consolidation II (Note: 3rd Brigade only) | 1971–1972 |
| Gulf War | Defense of Saudi Arabia | 1991 |
| Gulf War | Liberation and Defense of Kuwait | 1991 |
| Iraq | Iraqi Governance | 2004 |
| Iraq | National Resolution | 2005 |
| Iraq | Iraqi Surge | 2007 |
| Iraq | Iraqi Sovereignty | 2009 |
| Afghanistan | Consolidation III | 2011 |
| Afghanistan | Transition I | 2011–2012 |
| Afghanistan | Transition I | 2014 |
| Afghanistan | Transition II | 2015 |

=== Unit decorations ===
| Ribbon | Award | Year | Notes |
|---|---|---|---|
| | Presidential Unit Citation (Army) | 1965 | Pleiku Province |
| | Valorous Unit Award (Army) | 1970 | Fish Hook |
| | Meritorious Unit Commendation (Army) | 2003–2011 | Iraq |
| | Meritorious Unit Commendation (Army) | 2012 | Afghanistan (2011–2012) |
| | Meritorious Unit Commendation (Army) | 2015 | Afghanistan (2014–2015) |
| | Philippine Republic Presidential Unit Citation | 1944–1945 | Philippines campaign |
| | Republic of Korea Presidential Unit Citation (Army) | 1950 | Waegwan–Taegu |
| | Gold Cross of Valour (Greece) | 1955 | Korea |
| | Republic of Vietnam Cross of Gallantry, with Palm | 1965–1969 | For service in Vietnam |
| | Republic of Vietnam Cross of Gallantry, with Palm | 1969–1970 | For service in Vietnam |
| | Republic of Vietnam Cross of Gallantry, with Palm | 1970–1971 | For service in Vietnam |
| | Republic of Vietnam Cross of Gallantry, with Palm (Note: 3rd Brigade only) | 1971–1972 | For service in Vietnam |
| | Republic of Vietnam Civil Action Unit Citation | 1969–1970 | For service in Vietnam |

== Notable former members ==
- Nelson DeMille, served in the Vietnam War, American author
- William R. Haine, served in the Vietnam War, Bronze Star Recipient and Illinois State Senator
- Hal Moore, commander at the Battle of Ia Drang
- Kate Norley, served in the Iraq War, the wife of John Oliver
- Robert D. Rucker, served in the Vietnam War
- Dan Stoneking, served in the Vietnam War, journalist
- Steve Chassey, served in the Vietnam War, auto racing driver, multiple-time starter of the Indianapolis 500

== See also ==
- 1st Cavalry Division Horse Cavalry Detachment
- Complete list of commanders

== Media ==
- The short film AIRMOBILE DIVISION, THE (1966) is available for free viewing and download at the Internet Archive.
- The short film A-1-5 1st Air Cavalry, Binh Tuy Province (1971) is available for free viewing and download at the Internet Archive.
- The short film Big Picture: The New First Team is available for free viewing and download at the Internet Archive.
- The short film STAFF FILM REPORT 66-2A (1966) is available for free viewing and download at the Internet Archive.
- The short film STAFF FILM REPORT 66-1OA (1966) is available for free viewing and download at the Internet Archive.
- The short film STAFF FILM REPORT 66-12A (1966) is available for free viewing and download at the Internet Archive.
- The short film STAFF FILM REPORT 66-20A (1966) is available for free viewing and download at the Internet Archive.
- The short film STAFF FILM REPORT 66-21A (1966) is available for free viewing and download at the Internet Archive.
- The short film STAFF FILM REPORT 66-22A (1966) is available for free viewing and download at the Internet Archive.
- The short film STAFF FILM REPORT 66-29A (1966) is available for free viewing and download at the Internet Archive.
- The short film STAFF FILM REPORT 66-30A (1966) is available for free viewing and download at the Internet Archive.

| Preceded by 101st Airborne Division | Regional Command East; 2011–2012 | Succeeded by 1st Infantry Division |
