= 183rd Airlift Squadron =

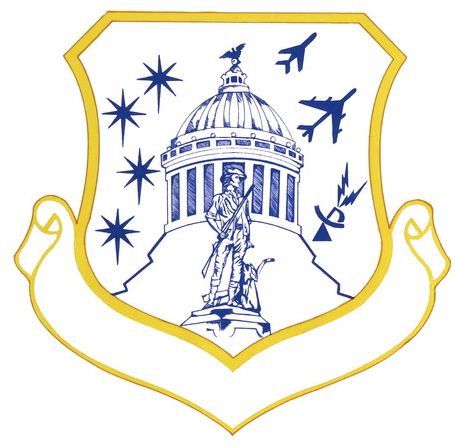
183rd Airlift Squadron

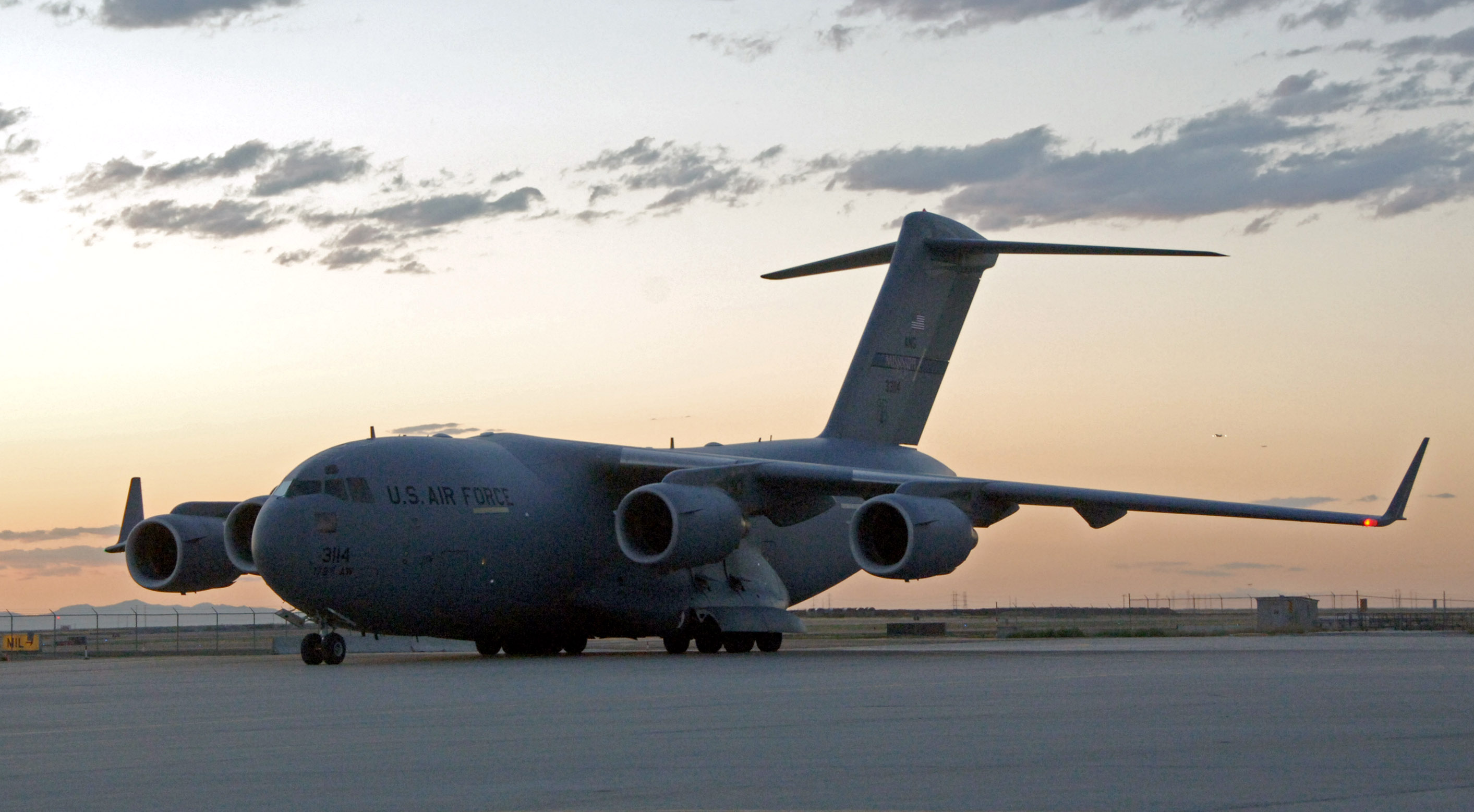
- C-17 Globemaster III from the 183rd Airlift Squadron
- Active: 1953–1972; 1972–present
- Country: United States
- Allegiance: Mississippi
- Branch: Air National Guard
- Type: Squadron
- Role: Airlift
- Part of: Mississippi Air National Guard
- Garrison/HQ: Allen C. Thompson ANGB Field, Jackson, Mississippi
- Nickname: Flying Jumbos
- Decorations: Air Force Outstanding Unit Award

Insignia
- 183rd Airlift Squadron emblem

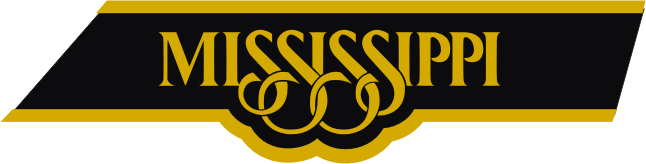
- Tail stripe

The 183rd Airlift Squadron is a unit of the 172nd Airlift Wing of the Mississippi Air National Guard, stationed at Allen C. Thompson Field Air National Guard Base, Mississippi. If activated to federal service, the wing is gained by the United States Air Force Air Mobility Command.

It was called to federal service during the first Gulf War. The 183rd was the first Air National Guard unit to convert to the C-17 Globemaster III.

== Mission ==
Its mission is to provide airlift and supporting units; provide for the airlift of troops and passengers, military equipment, cargo and aeromedical airlift and to participate in operations involving the airland or airdrop of troops, equipment and supplies when required.

== History ==
=== Reconnaissance ===
The squadron was constituted as the 183rd Tactical Reconnaissance Squadron in 1953 and allotted to the Air National Guard. It was organized at Hawkins Field, Mississippi and extended federal recognition on 1 July 1953. The squadron was assigned to the 117th Tactical Reconnaissance Group, of the Alabama Air National Guard, but operational control was exercised by the Mississippi Air National Guard.

The 183rd was initially equipped with World War II-era Douglas RB-26C Invader night photographic reconnaissance aircraft. The black RB-26s were light bombers that were modified for aerial reconnaissance in the late 1940s Most of the aircraft received were unarmed Korean War veterans, which carried cameras and flash flares for night aerial photography. Upon mobilization, the squadron would be gained by Tactical Air Command.

=== Strategic airlift ===
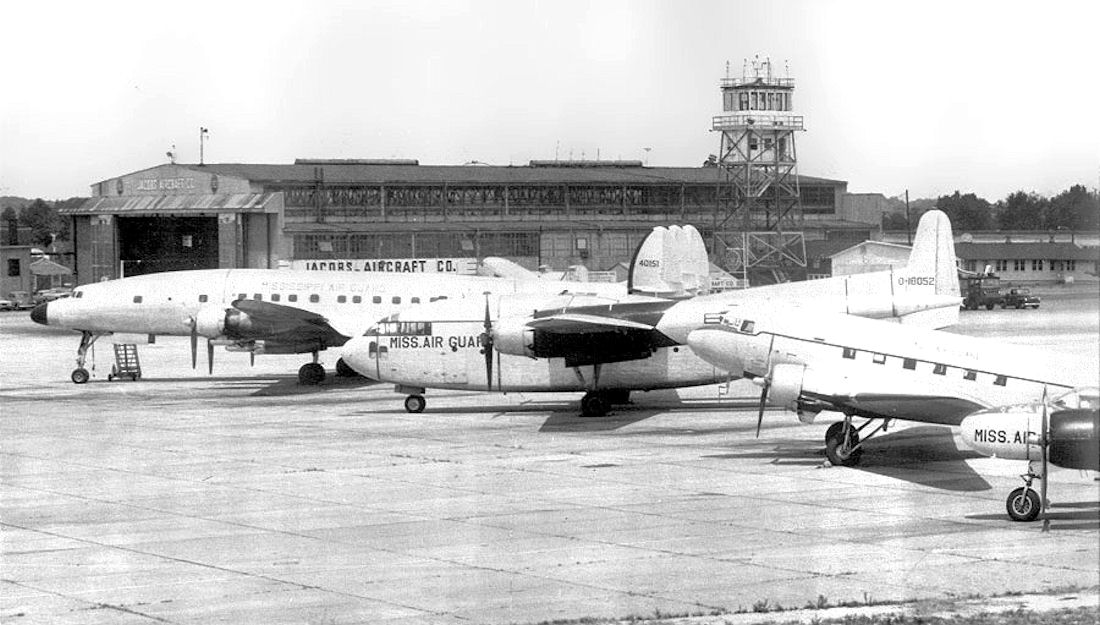
C-121, C-119 and C-46 at Hawkins Field

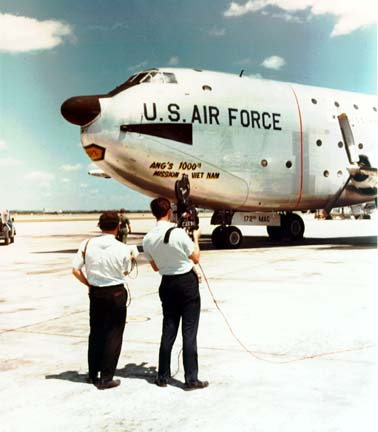
183rd Military Airlift Squadron C-124 Globemaster II (Note: Photo taken in South Vietnam on the occasion of the 1,000th Air National Guard flight to Vietnam.)>

In 1957, the B-26 was reaching the end of its operational service. The squadron's mobilization gaining command became Military Air Transport Service when it was redesignated the 183rd Aeromedical Transport Squadron and was equipped with Fairchild C-119 Flying Boxcar transports configured for medical transport and reassigned to the 106th Aeromedical Transport Group. Five years later the unit was upgraded with the Lockheed C-121 Constellation long-range transport in 1962, becoming the 183rd Air Transport Squadron and beginning to carry personnel to overseas locations in Europe and the Caribbean. The 183rd and its support elements expanded into a group level later that year, when the 172nd Air Transport Group was activated. The 183rd became the group's flying squadron. Support elements assigned into the group were the 183rd Material Squadron, 183rd Air Base Squadron, and the 183rd USAF Dispensary. The squadron moved from Hawkins to Allen C. Thompson Field, another field near Jackson, Mississippi in 1963.

The group received the Douglas C-124 Globemaster II heavy intercontinental transport was received in 1966 which meant supplies and equipment could be carried around the world along with personnel. 1966 was also marked by a change of mobilization command to Military Airlift Command (MAC) and the name to 183rd Military Airlift Squadron

=== Theater airlift ===
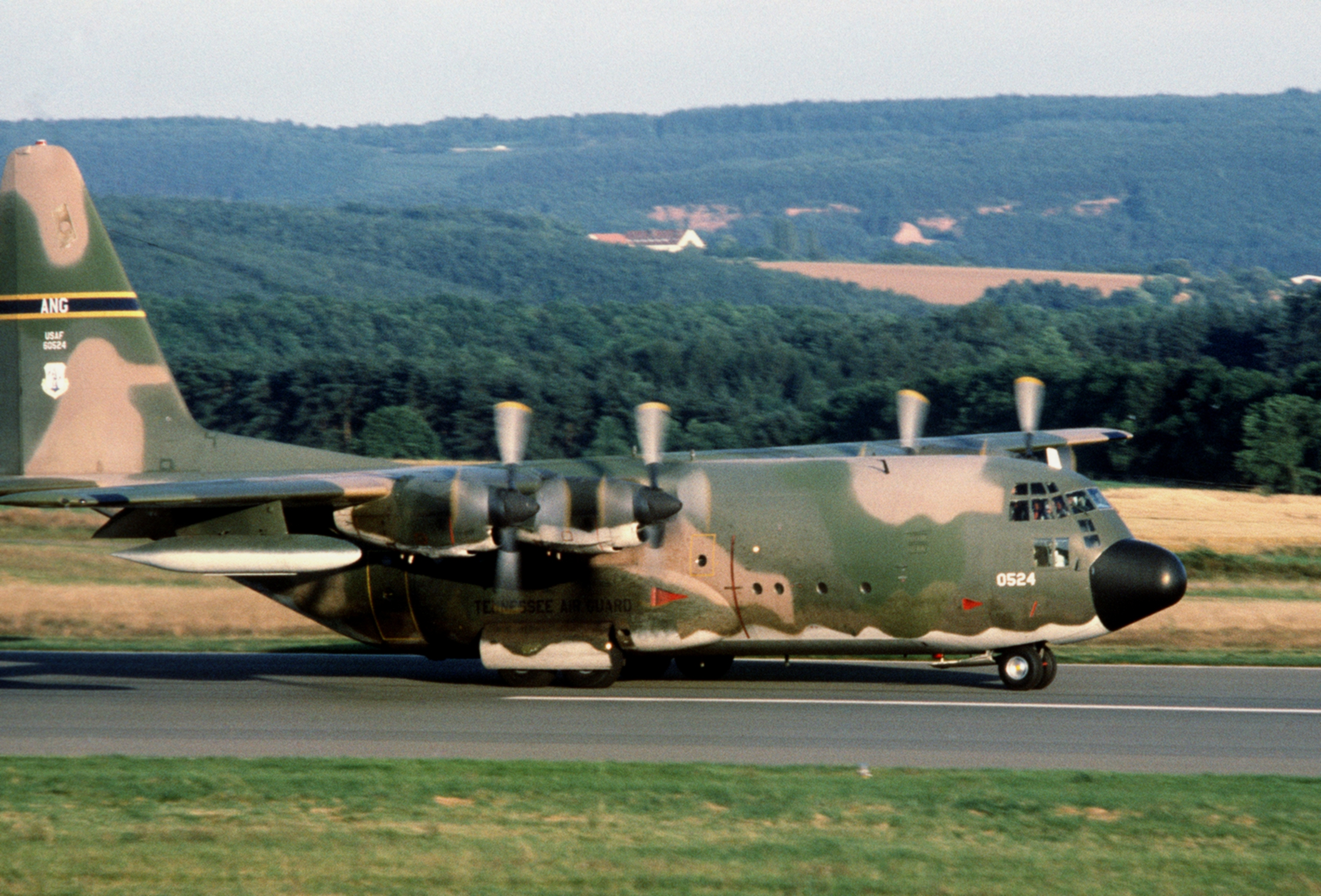
Air National Guard C-130E

The C-124 was being retired in the early 1970s and the 183rd was realigned to a theater transport mission, and equipped with Lockheed C-130E Hercules aircraft as the 183rd Tactical Airlift Squadron in May 1972. Once more, TAC gained the unit if it was called to federal service. It was upgraded to new 1979 production C-130H aircraft from 1980 and continued to fly tactical airlift missions until the mid-1980s.

=== Return to strategic airlift ===
On 12 July 1986 the first Lockheed C-141B Starlifter to be released from the active duty Air Force was assigned to the Mississippi Air National Guard. With a total of eight aircraft, the unit resumed a global airlift mission and was gained by MAC when mobilized.

In March 1988 the squadron took part in the airlift of approximately 3200 troops and almost 1000 tons of cargo on an exercise to Palmerola Air Base, Honduras. The 183rd was the only Air National Guard unit to participate in this airlift of troops to Honduras. On 6 December 1988 the Soviet Republic of Armenia suffered a powerful earthquake. The first Air Guard aircraft to fly to Armenia was a C-141B from the 183rd. Before relief missions to Armenia ended, the unit would fly six missions with its planes and crew and additionally would furnish a crew to fly a United States Air Force C-141 whose crew had reached the maximum flying hours permitted without rest. In September 1989 a devastating hurricane struck the tiny island of St. Croix, leaving the island crippled, the squadron flew eleven emergency relief missions to St. Croix, hauling 465 tons of cargo and 472 passengers.

From 20 December 1989 to 12 January 1990 the 183rd flew 21 sorties in support of Operation Just Cause, the operation to replace Manuel Noriega with a democratically elected government in Panama. The unit transported 403.6 tons of cargo and 1,274 passengers during the operation. On 7 August 1990 the 172nd's support of Operation Desert Shield and Desert Storm began when Approximately 98 aircrew members began flying voluntary missions. On 24 August 1990 the 183rd Airlift Squadron was one of the first two units to be called into active federal service and moved to Charleston Air Force Base, South Carolina. Until May 1991, shen the squadron was returned to state control the 148 members of the 183rd flew 2,880 sorties which transported 15,837 passengers and 25,949.2 tons of cargo.

In 2000, the squadron received the C-141C with an electronic "glass cockpit". In October 2000 after the USS Cole bombing in Yemen, seventeen members of the unit and the 183rd Aeromedical Evacuation Squadron deployed to Ramstein Air Base Germany. They picked up four injured sailors from Ramstein and flew them to Norfolk Naval Station, Virginia. In February 2003 the 183rd retired its last Starlifter in preparation for the arrival of the wing's first Boeing C-17 Globemaster III.

On 17 December 2003, Lt. Gen. Daniel James III, Director, Air National Guard, handed off the "keys" of the first C-17 Globemaster III (S/N 02-1112) to Maj. Gen. James H. Lipscomb III, adjutant general of the Mississippi National Guard. This plane was also the first Globemaster III assigned to the Air National Guard and was named the "Spirit of the Minutemen".

== Lineage ==
183rd Military Airlift Squadron

- Constituted as the 183rd Tactical Reconnaissance Squadron Night Photographic and allotted to the National Guard in 1953

Activated and extended federal recognition on 1 July 1953
Redesignated 183rd Aeromedical Transport Squadron, Light on 1 July 1957
Redesignated 183rd Air Transport Squadron, Heavy on 1 July 1962
Redesignated 183rd Military Airlift Squadron^{(1)} on 1 January 1966
Inactivated on 29 June 1972
Consolidated with 183rd Military Airlift Squadron^{(2)} on 17 August 1987

183rd Airlift Squadron
Constituted as the 183rd Tactical Airlift Squadron on 30 May 1972
Activated on 30 June 1972
Redesignated 183rd Military Airlift Squadron^{(2)} on 1 July 1986
Consolidated with 183rd Military Airlift Squadron^{(1)} on 17 August 1987
Federalized and placed on active duty on 24 August 1990
Released from active duty and returned to Mississippi state control on 30 May 1991
Redesignated 183rd Airlift Squadron on 16 March 1992

=== Assignments ===
- 117th Tactical Reconnaissance Group, 1 July 1953
- 106th Aeromedical Transport Group, 1 July 1957
- 118th Air Transport Wing 1 January 1963
- 172nd Air Transport Group (later 172nd Military Airlift Group), 10 December 1963 – 29 June 1972
- 172nd Tactical Airlift Group (later 172nd Military Airlift Group), 30 June 1972
- 315th Military Airlift Wing, 24 August 1990
- 172nd Military Airlift Group (later 172nd Airlift Group), 30 May 1991
- 172nd Operations Group, 1 October 1995 – Present

=== Stations ===
- Hawkins Field, Mississippi, 1 July 1953
- Allen C. Thompson Field, Jackson, Mississippi, c. 10 December 1963
- Charleston Air Force Base, South Carolina, 24 August 1990
- Allen C. Thompson Field (later Allen C. Thompson Field Air National Guard Base), Mississippi, 30 May 1991 – present

=== Aircraft ===
- Douglas RB-26C Invader, 1953-1957
- Fairchild C-119 Flying Boxcar, 1957-1962
- Lockheed C-121 Constellation, 1962-1966
- Douglas C-124C Globemaster II, 1966-1972
- Lockheed C-130E Hercules, 1972-1980
- Lockheed C-130H Hercules, 1980-1986
- Lockheed C-141B Starlifter, 1986-2000
- C-141C Starlifter, 2000-2004
- Boeing C-17 Globemaster III, 2004–Present

=== Decorations ===
- 12 time recipient of the Air Force Outstanding Unit Award
