= General Lutz =

General Lutz may refer to:

- Catherine S. Lutz (1955–2014), Mississippi National Guard major general
- Joseph Lutz (general) (1933–1999), U.S. Army major general
- Oswald Lutz (1876–1944), German Wehrmacht general

== See also ==
- Eduard von Lutz (1810–1893), Bavarian major general
