= Catherine S. Lutz =

Mississippi National Guard officer

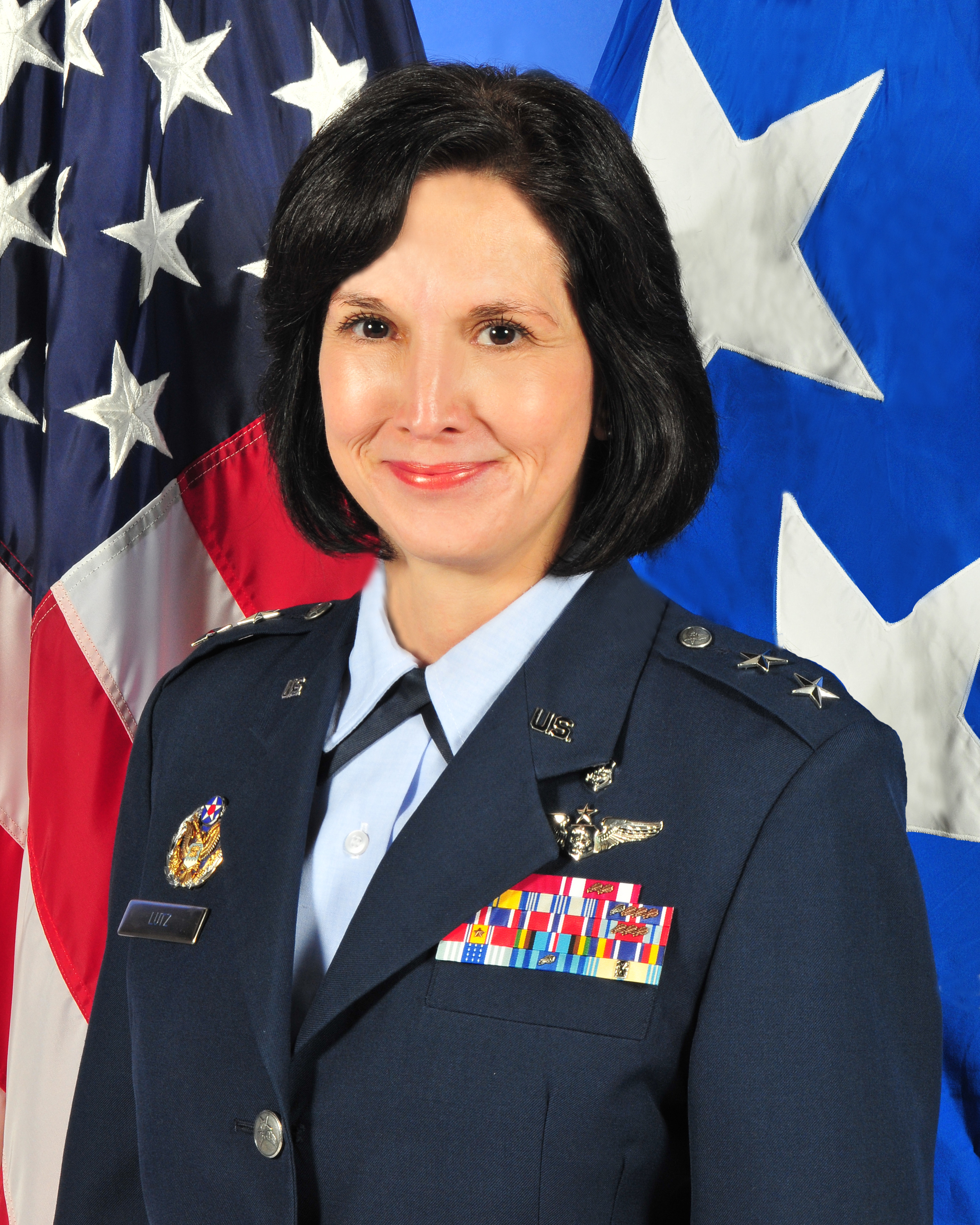
- Major General Catherine S. Lutz
- Born: August 11, 1955
- Died: January 16, 2014 (aged 58)
- Spouse: Major General William Lutz
- Military career
- Allegiance: United States
- Branch: United States National Guard
- Service years: 1982–2014
- Rank: Major General
- Unit: Mississippi National Guard
- Commands: Mississippi Air National Guard (2011–14); 172nd Medical Squadron (2001–04); 183rd Aeromedical Evacuation Squadron (1999–01)
- Awards: Legion of Merit; Meritorious Service Medal (3); Air Force Commendation Medal; Air Force Achievement Medal

Major General Catherine S. Lutz (August 11, 1955 – January 16, 2014) was a Mississippi National Guard officer. She began her career as a nurse before becoming a medical officer. She served in a series of postings before being promoted to the rank of brigadier general in 2009 while acting as assistant to the Chief Nurse of the Air Force, becoming the first female general officer in the history of the Mississippi National Guard. She was subsequently promoted to the rank of major general and commander of the Mississippi Air National Guard.

== Early life and career ==
Catherine S. Lutz was born on August 11, 1955. She studied at the University of Southern Mississippi and graduated with a Bachelor of Science in Nursing in 1977. Lutz joined the Mississippi Air National Guard as a second lieutenant and flight nurse in 1982. She received a Master of Science degree in nursing administration in 1985 from the University of Southern Mississippi and the same year was promoted to first lieutenant. In 1987 she transferred to the Medical Service Corps as a second lieutenant and was reinstated to the previous rank within a month. From 1988 to 1999, she served as a Clinic Administrator with the 172nd Medical Squadron at Jackson, Mississippi in which role she was promoted in progression to the rank of lieutenant colonel. Lutz said, "The military set me free. If I had not joined, I would have gotten bored just working in one place."

In 1998, Lutz was awarded a Doctor of Philosophy degree in education by the University of Mississippi. The next year she was appointed to command the 183rd Aeromedical Evacuation Squadron and from 2001 to 2004 commanded the 172nd Medical Squadron. Lutz was promoted to colonel in 2002 and from 2004 to 2005 served as Health Services Administrator in the 81st Medical Group. She afterwards served as a special assistant to the Adjutant General of the Mississippi National Guard for six months. From 2006 to 2008, Lutz was Air National Guard assistant to the commander of the 59th Medical Wing, at Lackland Air Force Base, Texas.

== General officer ==
From 2008 to 2011, Lutz was Air National Guard assistant to the Chief Nurse of the Air Force at Bolling Air Force Base, Washington, D.C. In this role she received promotion to the rank of brigadier general on January 12, 2009. Lutz thus became the first female general officer in the history of the Mississippi National Guard. During her career Lutz also served as a compliance officer at the Veterans Administration Hospital and commander of an Air Expeditionary Medical Unit in Riyadh, Saudi Arabia. She was a graduate of the Air Force Flight Nurse School, Squadron Officer School, Air Command and Staff College and Air War College and was awarded the Legion of Merit.

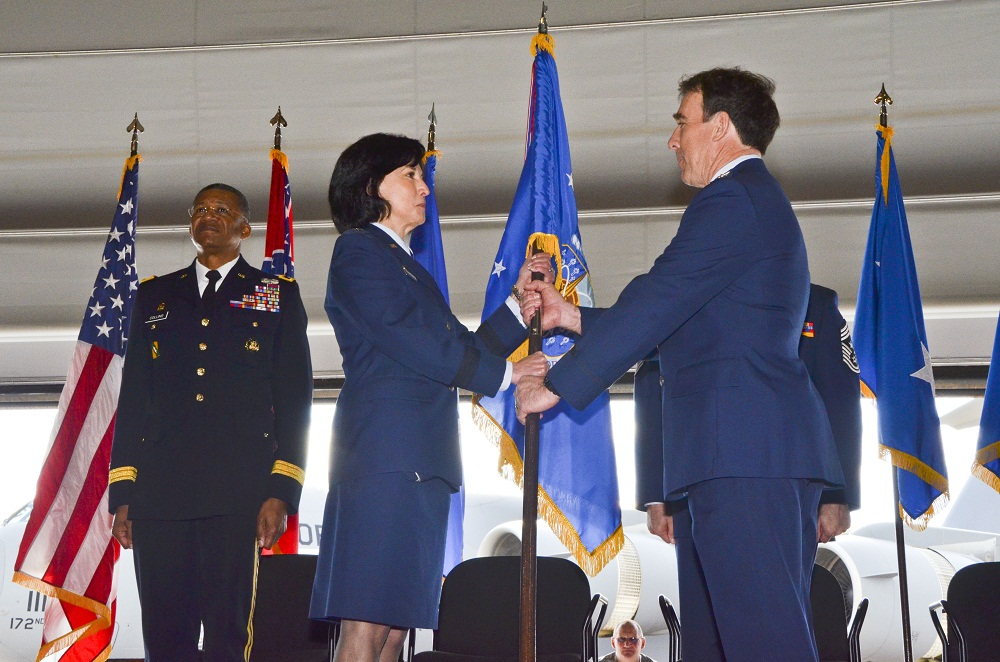
Lutz receiving promotion to Major General

Lutz was promoted to command the Mississippi Air National Guard in December 2011 and also served as the Assistant Adjutant General – Air for the Mississippi National Guard. She received promotion to the rank of major general on December 3, 2011. Lutz was married to Major General William Lutz, a former military officer and county chancery judge, who she first met when they both served on the same Air National Guard base in Flowood.

== Death ==
Lutz was diagnosed with brain cancer but continued to carry out her duties and attend events. She died on January 16, 2014, at the age of 58. In her honor the Governor of Mississippi, Phil Bryant, ordered that the state flags be flown at half mast on January 20, the day of her funeral at St. Joseph Catholic Church in Gluckstadt. A military ceremony in her memory was held the same day at Canton City Cemetery.
