= 631st Field Artillery Brigade (United States) =

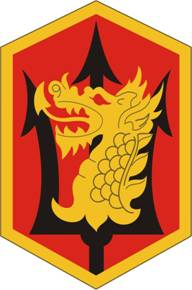
- Active: 1917-2008
- Country: United States
- Branch: Army National Guard
- Role: Field Artillery
- Size: Brigade
- Garrison/HQ: Grenada, Mississippi
- Motto: Fast Competent Accurate

Insignia
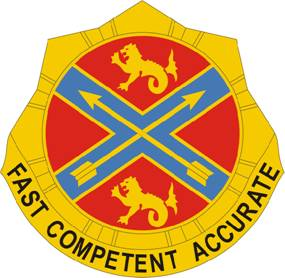
- 631st Field Artillery Brigade DUI

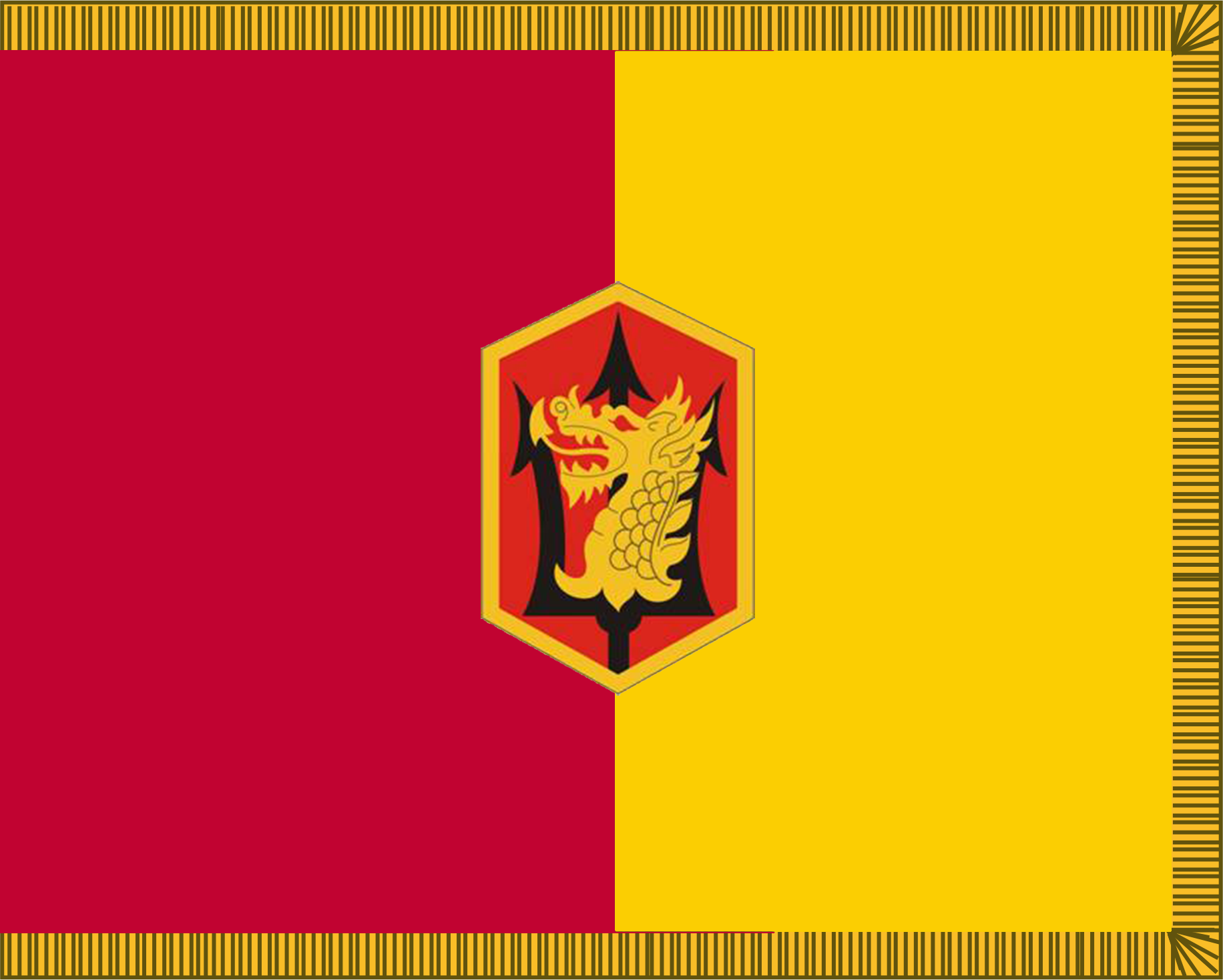
- 631st Field Artillery Brigade Flag

The 631st Field Artillery Brigade (United States) was a unit of the Mississippi National Guard until 2008.

== History ==
The unit was originally raised in 1917 in Grenada, Miss as HHC, 1st Field Artillery.

It would be federalized as HHB, 140th Field Artillery in the 39th Infantry Division for World War I where it would earn a general campaign streamer without inscription. It was demobilized and inactive from 1919-1926 when it would become HHB and Combat Train, 1st Battalion, 178th Field Artillery of 31st Infantry Division. It would be federalized again in 1940 and redesignated HHB, 114th Field Artillery Battalion. In World War II it would earn streamers for New Guinea and Southern Philippines in addition to a Philippine Presidential Unit Citation.

On 15 June 1954 the inheritor of the HHB 114 FAB lineage was consolidated with HQB 234 FAB, and redesignated as the Headquarters Battery, 234th Field Artillery Battalion, an element of the 31st Infantry Division (United States). It was reorganized and redesignated on 1 May 1959 as Headquarters Battery, 3d Rocket Howitzer Battalion, 114th Artillery, an element of the 31st Infantry Division. The battery was ordered into active Federal service on 30 September 1962 at Grenada; released 9 October 1962 from active Federal service and reverted to state control.

It was reorganized and redesignated 1 May 1963 as Headquarters Battery (Mississippi part), 31st Infantry Division Artillery. It was then consolidated on 15 February 1968 with the 115th Engineer Platoon (organized and Federally recognized 20 December 1965 at Grenada) and relieved from assignment to the 31st Infantry Division; consolidated unit concurrently reorganized and redesignated as Headquarters and Headquarters Battery, 631st Artillery Group. Redesignated 1 February 1972 as Headquarters and Headquarters Battery, 631st Field Artillery Group. Redesignated 1 September 1978 as Headquarters and Headquarters Battery, 631st Field Artillery Brigade.

The brigade was deactivated in 2008.
