= Camp Shelby =

National Guard training facility near Hattiesburg, Mississippi, US

Coordinates: 31°11′16″N 89°11′57″W

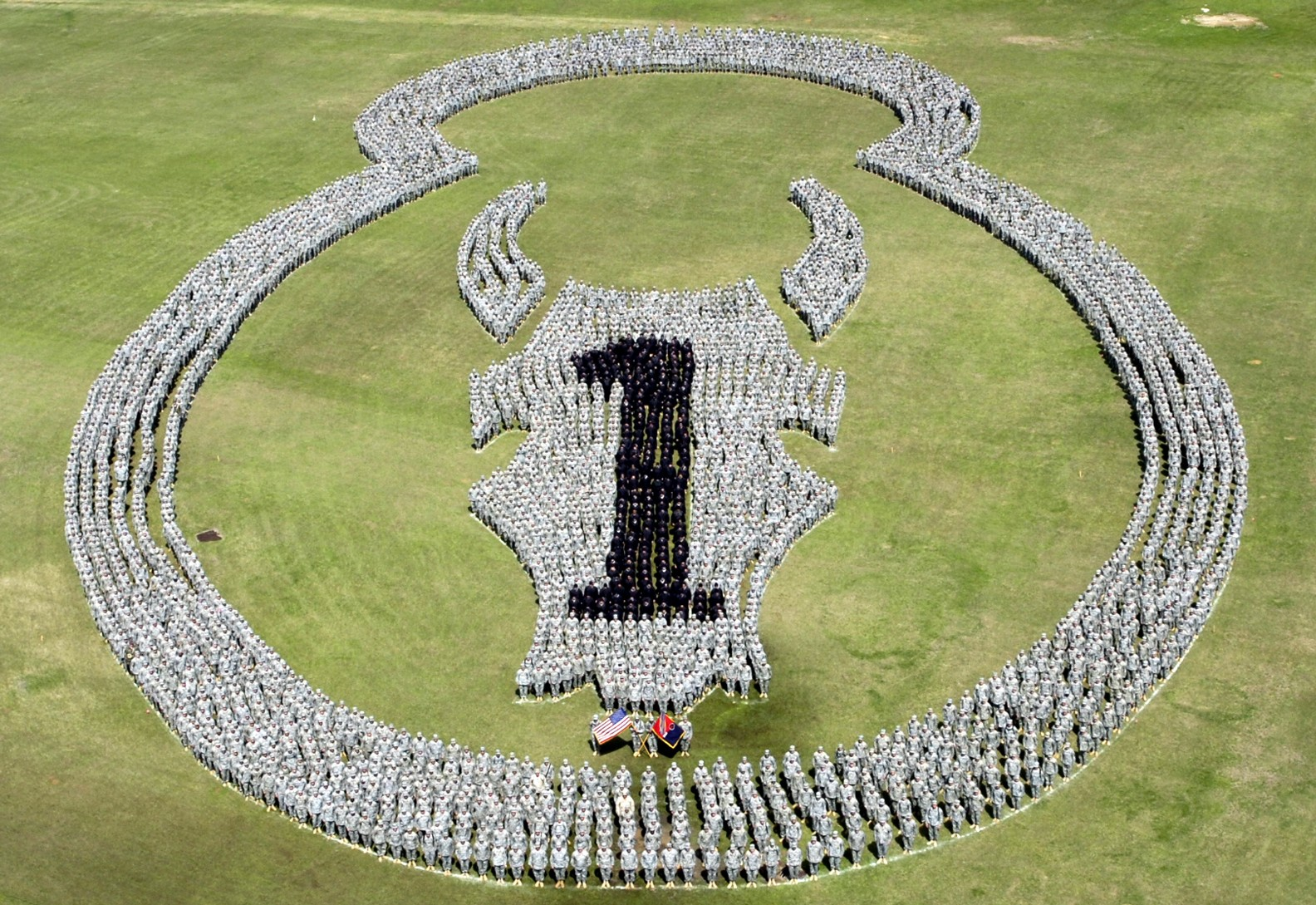
1st Brigade - 34th Infantry Division, during a farewell ceremony from Camp Shelby, March 16, 2006

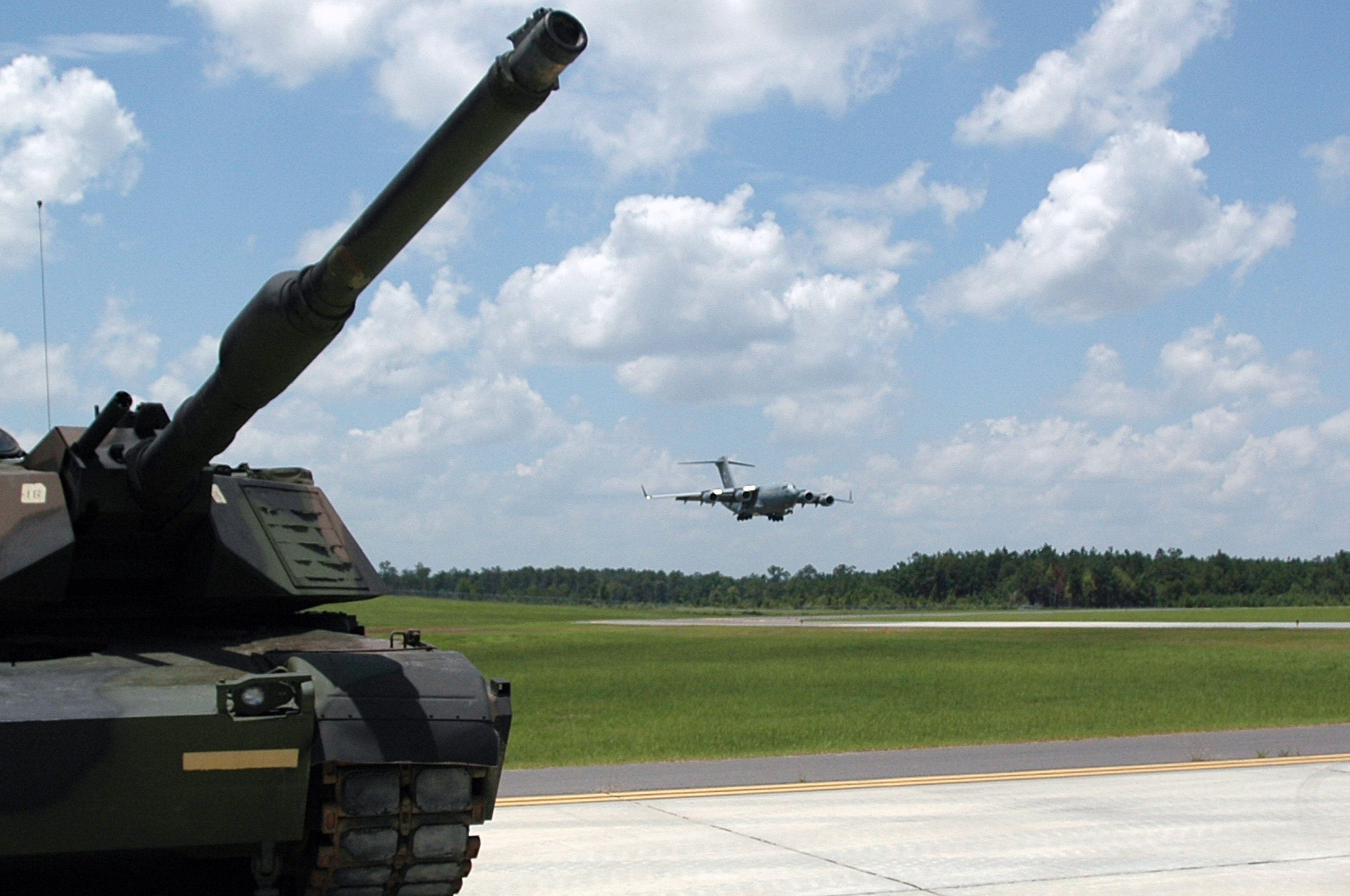
A C-17 Globemaster III from the Mississippi Air National Guard's 172nd Airlift Wing lands at the new assault training runway at Camp Shelby on July 9, 2007

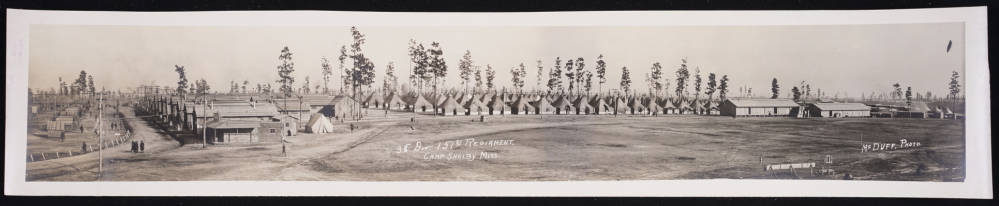
151st Regiment living quarters at Camp Shelby

Camp Shelby is a U.S. Army post whose south gate is located at the southern boundary of Hattiesburg, Mississippi, along U.S. Highway 49. It was originally established during World War I, and has served almost continuously since then as a training site. Operated by the Mississippi National Guard, is the largest state-owned training site in the nation. Camp Shelby Joint Forces Training Center (CSJFTC), encompassing over 525 square kilometres (129,730 acres) of land (a mix of state, Department of Defense, and U.S. Forest Service-owned lands in the DeSoto National Forest) is located in portions of Perry and Forrest Counties, in southern Mississippi. The size of the camp allows up to battalion-level maneuver training for infantry, live-fire mechanized infantry platoon exercises, field artillery firing, and a wide range of support activities.

Camp Shelby is the normal annual training location for National Guard and Reserve units located in Mississippi, Alabama, and Tennessee. The 2nd Battalion, 114th Field Artillery of the Mississippi National Guard conducts its gunnery training at Camp Shelby, and has the bulk of its combat equipment stored in the camp's Mobilization and Annual Training Equipment Site (MATES) located there. In addition to the Army's reserve components, active-duty Army, Navy, Marine Corps, and Air Force personnel from across the country use its assets to support a variety of missions, and the camp hosts as many as 100,000 personnel annually. It is a training ground for the M1 Abrams tank, M109 self-propelled howitzer, and the home of the 3rd Brigade, 87th Division (Training Support). During wartime, the camp's mission is to serve as a major independent mobilization station of the United States Army Forces Command (FORSCOM).

== History ==
Camp Shelby was established in 1917. The post was named in honor of Isaac Shelby, Indian fighter, American Revolutionary War hero, and the first Governor of Kentucky, by the first troops to train here, the 38th Division.

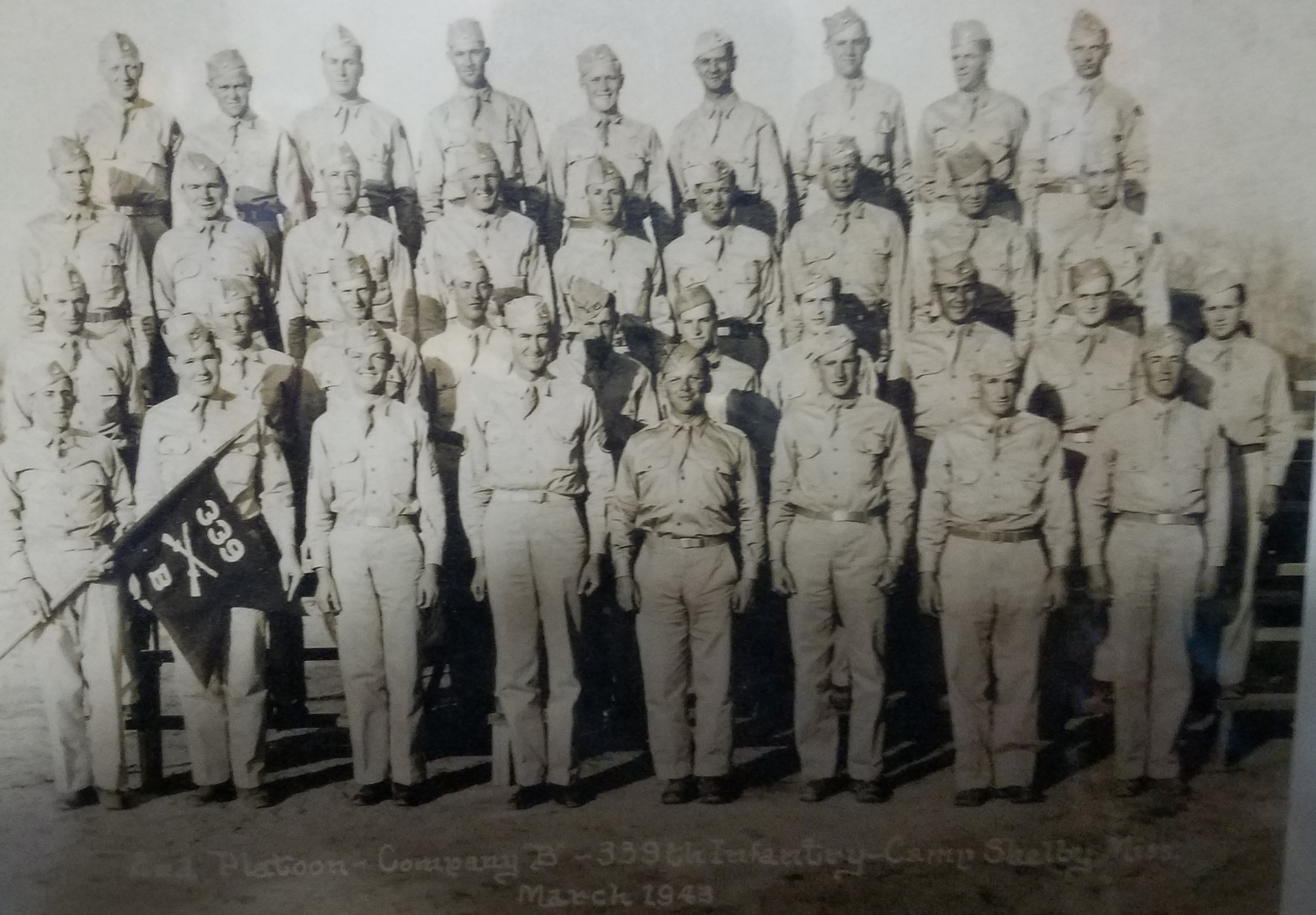
Men of the 2nd Platoon-Company B 339th Infantry Regiment at Camp Shelby, Mississippi in March 1943.

Soldiers watch a boxing match a Camp Shleby, circa 1910s

In 1934, the state of Mississippi acquired the site for use as a summer camp by its National Guard. Because of Camp Shelby's natural advantages of climate and location, plus a great variety of terrain including part of the Ragland Hills, it was acquired by the federal government in 1940 and expanded. Some of the divisions that trained in Mississippi before and during World War II included the 31st, 37th, 38th, 43rd, 63rd, 65th, 69th, 85th, 94th, and 99th Infantry Divisions.

The famous Japanese-American 442nd Regimental Combat Team and the 100th Battalion trained here in preparation for combat in World War II. The unit was the subject of the 1951 film Go For Broke! and the 2006 film Only the Brave). Women's Army Corps (WAC) units also trained here. The post contained a large convalescent hospital and had a prisoner of war camp which housed soldiers of the famous German Afrika Korps. Camp Shelby is also home to the Mississippi Armed Forces Museum, and the history of the camp is a significant part of the museum's collection. The post was closed shortly after the end of World War II.

During the Korean War, Camp Shelby was established as an emergency railhead facility. In the summer of 1954, non-divisional National Guard units trained at Camp Shelby and in 1956, it was designated a permanent training site by the Continental Army Command (now FORSCOM). The 199th Infantry Brigade trained at Camp Shelby from September to November 1966 in preparation for deployment to Vietnam from Fort Benning, Georgia. The 199th was the only combat unit to train at Camp Shelby during the Vietnam War.

Over 5,000 troops were processed through Camp Shelby during Operation Desert Storm. Camp Shelby was federalized as a FORSCOM Mobilization Center on June 6, 2004. Since then, several Regimental or Brigade Combat Teams have mobilized through Camp Shelby, including the 278th Armored Cavalry Regiment (Tennessee Army National Guard); the 155th Heavy Brigade Combat Team (Mississippi ARNG); the 2nd Brigade Combat Team, 28th Infantry Division (Pennsylvania ARNG); the 56th Stryker Brigade Combat Team, 28th Infantry Division (PA ARNG); the 53rd Infantry Brigade Combat Team (FL ARNG); the 1st Armored Brigade Combat Team, 34th Infantry Division (Minnesota ARNG); the 41st Infantry Brigade Combat Team (Oregon ARNG); the 256th Infantry Brigade Combat Team (LA ARNG); the 116th Cavalry Brigade Combat Team (Idaho ARNG), the 27th Infantry Brigade Combat Team (New York ARNG), and the 48th Infantry Brigade Combat Team (GA ARNG).

U.S. Navy Seabee units homeported or mobilized from the Naval Construction Battalion Center in Gulfport, Mississippi utilize Camp Shelby as the site for their Field Training Exercises (FTX).

Camp Shelby is also home to the Youth Challenge Academy (a military structured GED and state high school diploma program established in 1994 to aid Mississippi high school dropouts, ages 16 to 18, designed and operated by the National Guard Bureau).

In mid-2007, the Air National Guard opened a new combat training runway at Camp Shelby. The 210-acre (0.8 km^{2}) Shelby Auxiliary Field One is one of several

Contingency Operating Location 3 at Camp Shelby is used for Air Force Reserve Officer Training Corps field training.

Camp Shelby also serves as the training facility for the Mississippi State Guard annual training and is home to the 310th Battalion (MSSG) 315th MP Co.

== Mobilization support ==
- The 278th Armored Cavalry Regiment mobilized twice for Iraq deployment. First in June–September 2004 for OIF 3 and demobilized in October 2005. The entire 386th Engineer Battalion from the Texas Army National Guard based in Corpus Christi, Texas, was attached to the 278th for the first Iraq deployment. The regiment mobilized a second time for deployment to Iraq from December 2009 to February 2010, and demobilized in August 2010.
- The 32nd Infantry Brigade Combat Team and the 121st Field Artillery Regiment (United States) of the Wisconsin Army National Guard mobilized battalions for Iraq and Kuwait from August 2005 to June 2006 in rotation.
- The 56th Stryker Brigade Combat Team of the Pennsylvania Army National Guard mobilized for Iraq deployment between August and November 2008.
- The 168th Engineer Brigade mobilized from Camp Shelby for its deployment to Afghanistan in 2009.
- The 136th Military Police Battalion (IR) of the Texas Army National Guard, based in Tyler, Texas, mobilized for deployment to Afghanistan in April 2009 and demobilized in 2010.
- The 256th Infantry Brigade of the Louisiana Army National Guard mobilized for Iraq deployment between January and March 2010 and demobilized in December 2011.
- The 45th Infantry Brigade Combat Team of the Oklahoma Army National Guard mobilized for Afghanistan deployment between April and May 2011 and demobilized in 2012.
- The 27th Infantry Brigade Combat Team of the New York Army National Guard and the 4th Battalion, 118th Infantry Regiment of the South Carolina Army National Guard mobilized for Afghanistan and Kuwait deployment between January and April 2012 and demobilized in 2013.

== See also ==
- The Camp Shelby burrowing crayfish is named after the base
