= Mississippi Military Department =

The Mississippi Military Department is a state agency and part of the Mississippi executive branch. The Adjutant General (TAG) of Mississippi serves as the executive director of the Mississippi Military Department. The TAG reports to the Governor of Mississippi regarding the department and state military forces.

== Components ==
=== Mississippi Army National Guard ===
The Mississippi Army National Guard (MSARNG) is the Army National Guard component of the Mississippi National Guard. Mississippi Army National Guard units are trained and equipped as part of the United States Army when federalized.

=== Mississippi Air National Guard ===
The Mississippi Air National Guard (MSANG) is the Air National Guard component of the Mississippi National Guard. Its units are Air Reserve Components (ARC) of the United States Air Force (USAF). MSANG units are trained and equipped by the Air Force and are operationally gained by a Major Command of the USAF if federalized.

=== Mississippi State Guard ===
The Mississippi State Guard (MSSG) is the state defense force of Mississippi. It is a volunteer organization that supplements the Mississippi National Guard when ordered by the Governor of the State of Mississippi through the Adjutant General of the State of Mississippi. The MSSG may be tasked with securing armories, assistance to Guard families, and assuming other duties.

== See also ==
- Mississippi Army National Guard
- Mississippi Air National Guard
- Mississippi State Guard

== Links ==
- Adjutant General's Office
- Mississippi National Guard
- Mississippi State Guard
