= Ragland Hills =

Hills in Mississippi, USA

Coordinates: 31.228151°N 89.135754°W

The Ragland Hills are a rugged, largely forested series of hills and ravines in Forrest and Perry counties, Mississippi. They formed by water erosion of thick clay, gravel and sand deposits, with the Leaf River and its tributaries responsible for the downcutting. Part of Camp Shelby is in the Ragland Hills.

Many plant community types occur. The mesic beech-magnolia forest of ravines is especially interesting due to its mix of subtropical species including Magnolia grandiflora, Tillandsia usneoides and Sabal minor with northern inland species such as Fagus grandifolia, Arisaema dracontium, A. triphyllum, Medeola virginiana, Phryma leptostachya, Sanguinaria canadensis, Trillium cuneatum, Uvularia perfoliata and U. sessilifolia.
