= Hawkins Field (airport) =

Airport in Mississippi, United States

Hawkins Field (former Jackson Army Airfield)
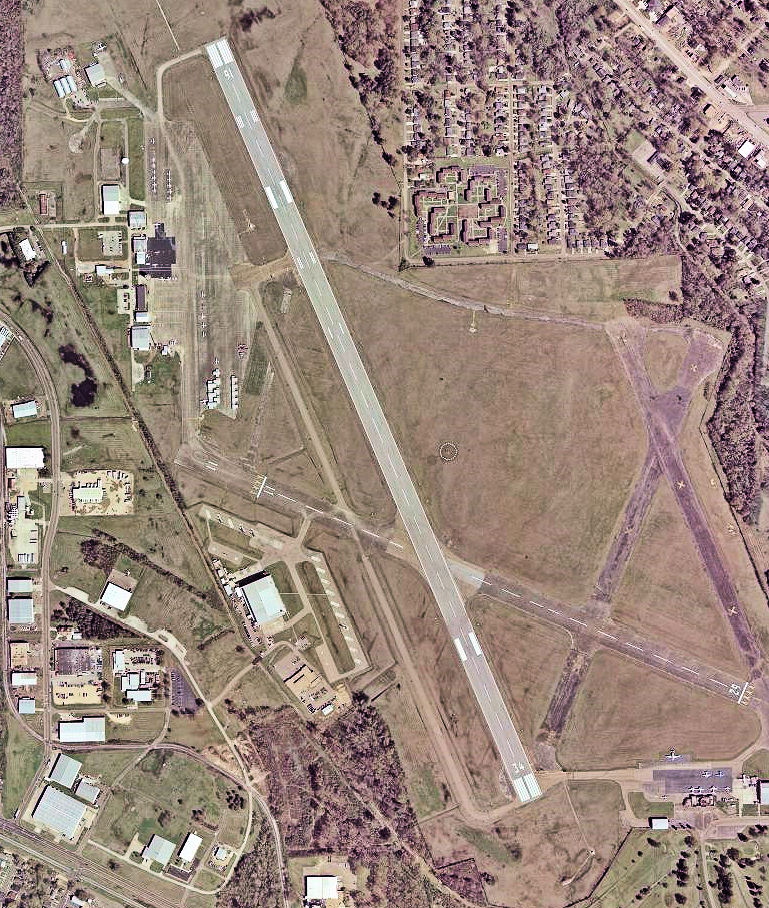
- USGS 2003 orthophoto
- IATA: HKS; ICAO: KHKS; FAA LID: HKS

Summary
- Airport type: Public
- Owner: City of Jackson
- Operator: Jackson Municipal Airport Authority
- Serves: Jackson, Mississippi
- Elevation AMSL: 341 ft (104 m)
- Coordinates: 32°20′05″N 90°13′21″W

Map
- Location within Mississippi Location within the United States

Runways
Direction	Length		Surface
Direction	ft	m	Surface
16/34	5,387	1,642	Asphalt
11/29	3,431	1,046	Concrete

Statistics (2024)
- Aircraft operations (year ending 3/27/2024): 20,778
- Based aircraft: 70
- Sources: Airport website, FAA

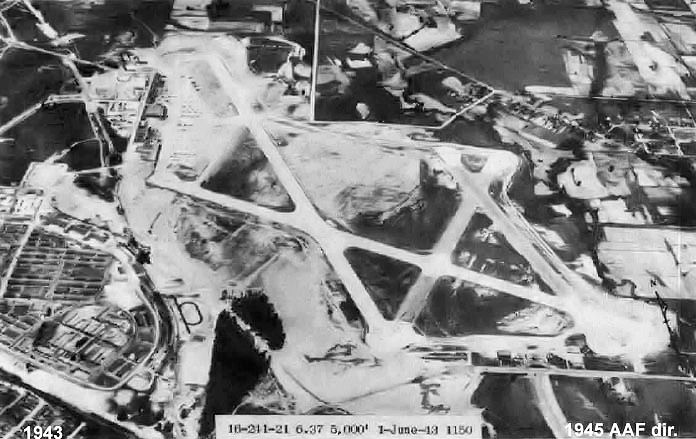
Jackson AAB Mississippi (June 1, 1943)

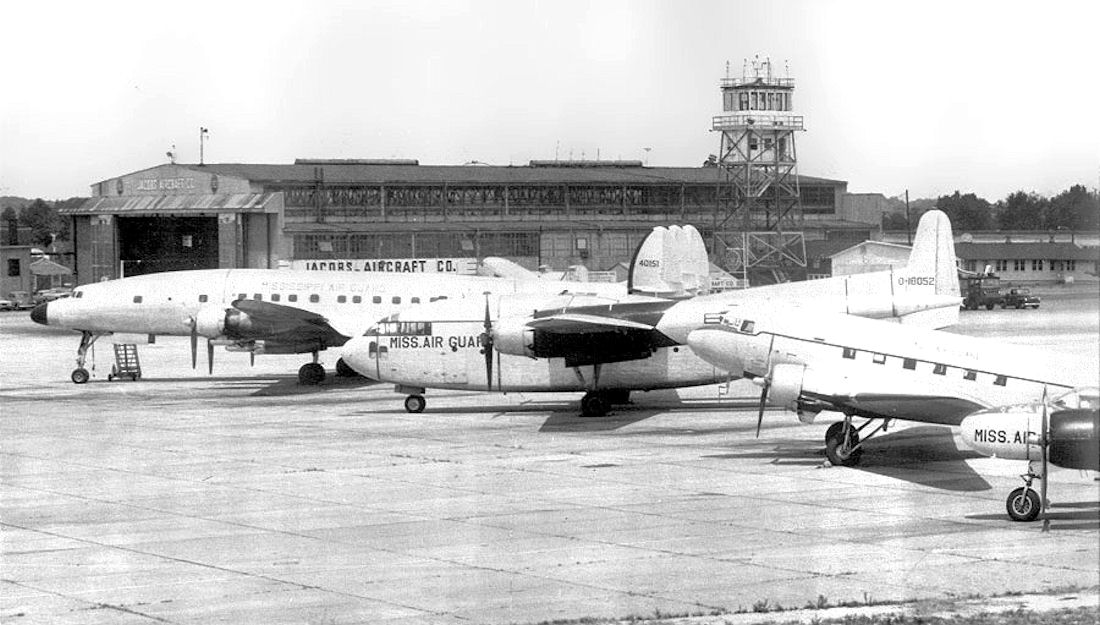
Mississippi Air National Guard 172d Air Transport Squadron C-121, C-119, C-47 aircraft and 183rd Tactical Reconnaissance Squadron RB-26 aircraft at Hawkins Field, 1962, with World War II era control tower, hangar, and buildings

Hawkins Field (IATA: HKS, ICAO: KHKS, FAA LID: HKS) is a joint civil-military public airport in Jackson, Mississippi. It is owned by the City of Jackson and operated by the Jackson Municipal Airport Authority. The National Plan of Integrated Airport Systems for 2011–2015 called it a general aviation facility.

== History ==
Aviation in Jackson began in 1928 with the purchase of 151 acres of pasture land in the City of Jackson known then as Davis Stock Farm for $53,500. Davis Field, Jackson's first airport, was dedicated November 9, 1928. Delta Air Lines made its first flight that year beginning in Dallas landing in Jackson and other cities en route to Atlanta.

In 1936, the Works Progress Administration's (WPA), Civil Conservation Corps (CCC) invested $62,150 to improve the airport with a terminal building and paving of an apron. In 1941, the airfield was named Hawkins Field after A.F. Hawkins, a city commissioner with an interest in aviation.

=== World War II ===
In May 1941, the Dutch government-in-exile, following the occupation of the Netherlands, established the Royal Netherlands Military Flying School at Hawkins Field. The school operated Lend-Lease aircraft with civilian pilots from the Mississippi Institute of Aeronautics. Training was conducted with U.S. Army Air Corps and later with U.S. Army Air Forces units in the southeast United States; however, operation of the school and flight training were done by civilians.

In June 1941, Hawkins Field was redesignated Jackson Army Airfield. It activated on May 1, 1942, and was used by the United States Army Air Forces' Flying Training Command as a basic flying training airfield (Army Air Forces Pilot School, Miscellaneous Fields for Basic and Advanced Single and Twin-Engine training). When the U.S. Army took over Hawkins Field, a massive military construction program was initiated to expand the civil airport. Construction was rapid given the emergency wartime conditions and within three months the post was to be in full operation. The airfield had four concrete runways 3,317 by 150 feet (1,011 m × 46 m) NNE/SSW, 3,310 by 150 feet (1,009 m × 46 m) NNW/SSE, 4,825 by 150 feet (1,471 m × 46 m) NW/SE, 5,400 by 150 feet (1,646 m × 46 m) NNW/SSE; asphalt on first two runways and concrete the others. The runways were laid out on an "A" layout, with one extended length main runway, and two short secondary runways connected to the apron. Auxiliary airfields to support the training activities at the base were:

- Augustine Field 32°26′19″N 90°06′11″W
- Lime Prairie 32°18′16″N 90°24′36″W

In addition to the airfield, the building of a large support base with several hundred buildings, numerous streets, and a utility network was carried out with barracks, various administrative buildings, maintenance shops and hangars. The station facility consisted of a large number of buildings based on standardized military plans and architectural drawings of the period, with the buildings designed to be the "cheapest, temporary character with structural stability only sufficient to meet the needs of the service which the structure is intended to fulfill during the period of its contemplated war use" was underway. To conserve critical materials, most facilities were constructed of wood, concrete, brick, gypsum board and concrete asbestos. Metal was sparsely used. The station and its buildings, together with complete water, sewer, electric and gas utilities, was designed to be nearly self-sufficient, with not only hangars, but barracks, warehouses, hospitals, dental clinics, dining halls, and maintenance shops were needed. There were libraries, social clubs for officers and enlisted men, and stores to buy living necessities.

The Netherlands pilots operated from the facility as a separate entity until January 1942 when the Army Air Forces Southeast Training Center took over the base and the Dutch pilots began training under the auspices of 74th Flying Training Wing at Maxwell Field, Alabama. The 35th Base Headquarters and Air Base Squadron was responsible for the operation of the non-flying elements of the base. Operational training squadrons were:

- 735th Basic Flying Training Squadron (Vultee BT-13 Valiant)
- 736th Single-Engine Flying Training Squadron (North American T-6 Texan)
- 737th Twin-Engine Flying Training Squadron (B-25 Mitchell)

On July 1, 1944, Jackson Army Air Base was transferred to the Third Air Force. Training was re-organized under the 2159th Army Air Force Base Unit, with three flying squadrons "A", "B" and "C", and was consolidated with units being reassigned from Laurel Army Airfield to Jackson. The Netherlands aviators left in May 1945, and flight training was closed down in October.

Third Air Force operated the airfield as an Air Force Reserve training center (2588th Air Force Reserve Training Unit) until March 31, 1949, when the United States Air Force excessed Hawkins Field and returned it to civil control.

=== Postwar use ===
It was not until 1949 that Hawkins was again classified as a civil airfield (though Delta and C&S had scheduled flights to Hawkins for years). In 1963 the City began work to annex land in Rankin County for a new airport for jets (Hawkins' longest runway was 5383 feet). Allen C. Thompson Field, or Jackson Municipal Airport, (now Jackson Medgar Wiley Evers International Airport) opened later that year, one of the first airports with parallel runways, versus the cross wind intersecting runways at the airport it replaced. With the opening of Jackson Municipal Airport, Hawkins Field became a general aviation airport.

The Kerry Committee report which began in the United States Senate in early 1986 contains a U.S. Customs and DEA investigation report on drug trafficking using DC-4s at Hawkins Field.

== Mississippi Air National Guard ==
The United States Air Force returned in the summer of 1953 when the Mississippi Air National Guard began utilizing certain facilities of Hawkins Field.

What is known today as the 172d Airlift Wing (172 AW) of the Mississippi Air National Guard began in 1953 as the Tactical Air Command's 183d Tactical Reconnaissance Squadron (Night Photo), an Air National Guard unit at Hawkins Field equipped with RB-26 Invaders for night photo reconnaissance missions. Six Fairchild C-119 Flying Boxcars replaced the RB-26 in 1957 when the 183d became an Aeromedical Transport Squadron (Light) as part of the Military Air Transport Service. The C-119 widened the mission of the unit and by 1961 plans for a new airport were on the drawing board. The Department of Defense initially leased 64 acres of land in Rankin County to the City of Jackson for the new Air National Guard complex and construction of the present base began on April 15, 1961.

On July 1, 1962 the Lockheed C-121 Constellation aircraft arrived in Mississippi and the squadron was redesignated as the MATS' 172d Air Transport Squadron. These sleek, four-engine propeller-driven aircraft marked the beginning of the unit's world mission with a flight to Germany on Saturday, June 1, 1963. The C-121s continued to operate from Hawkins Field until early 1964 when the 172d moved to new facilities at Jackson International Airport in Rankin County.

== Mississippi Army National Guard ==
The United States Army continues to operate from Hawkins Field via the Mississippi Army National Guard's Army Aviation Support Facility #1 (AASF #1), the 1st Battalion of the 185th Aviation Regiment, and the 185th Theater Aviation Brigade. Aircraft operated at Hawkins Field include UH-60 Blackhawk and OH-58 Kiowa helicopters.

== Facilities ==
Hawkins Field covers 602 acres (244 ha) at an elevation of 341 feet (104 m). It has two active runways: 16/34 is 5,387 by 150 feet (1,642 x 46 m) asphalt; 11/29 is 3,431 by 150 feet (1,046 x 46 m) concrete. Two additional runways from the World War II era are closed.

In the year ending March 27, 2024, the airport had 20,778 aircraft operations or an average of 57 per day: 71% general aviation, 20% military, and 9% air taxi. 70 aircraft were then based at the airport: 35 single-engine, 13 multi-engine, 19 military, and 3 jet.

== Incidents ==
On November 13, 2012, a Piper PA-32 single-engine plane crashed into single family homes on approach to HKS airport, killing the 3 people on board.

== In Media ==
Jackson Army Air Base was the name of an abandoned military installation in the 1978 film Capricorn One, the premise of which was a government conspiracy and hoax of a crewed space mission to Mars. But unlike the present day Hawkins Field, the film version of the base was located in Texas.

== See also ==
- List of airports in Mississippi
- Mississippi World War II Army Airfields
- 28th Flying Training Wing (World War II)
