= Mississippi Wing Civil Air Patrol =

Wing of Civil Air Patrol

Associated branches
- United States Air Force

Command staff
- Commander: Col Gary Hornosky
- Deputy Commander: Lt Col Al Shiyou
- Chief of Staff: Lt Col Edith Street

Current statistics
- Cadets: 252
- Seniors: 347
- Total Membership: 599
- Website: mswg.cap.gov
- Statistics as of 2026

The Mississippi Wing of Civil Air Patrol (CAP) is the highest echelon of Civil Air Patrol in the state of Mississippi. Mississippi Wing headquarters are located in Jackson, Mississippi. The Mississippi Wing consists of over 600 cadet and adult members at over 14 locations across the state of Mississippi.

== Mission ==
Civil Air Patrol has three missions: providing emergency services; offering cadet programs for youth; and providing aerospace education for both Civil Air Patrol members and the general public.

=== Emergency services ===
The CAP actively provides emergency services, includes search and rescue and disaster relief operations, as well as assisting in the providing of humanitarian aid. In 2014, the Mississippi Wing performed six search and rescue missions and saved six lives.

The CAP also provides Air Force support through conducting light transport, communications support, and low-altitude route surveys. Civil Air Patrol can also offer support to counter-drug missions.

=== Cadet programs ===
The CAP offers cadet programs for youth aged 12 to 18, including, but not limited to: providing aerospace education, leadership training, physical fitness and moral leadership to cadets.

=== Aerospace education ===
The CAP provides aerospace education for both CAP members and the general public. Fulfilling the education component of the overall CAP mission includes training members of CAP, offering workshops for youth throughout the nation through schools, and providing education through public aviation events.

== Organization ==
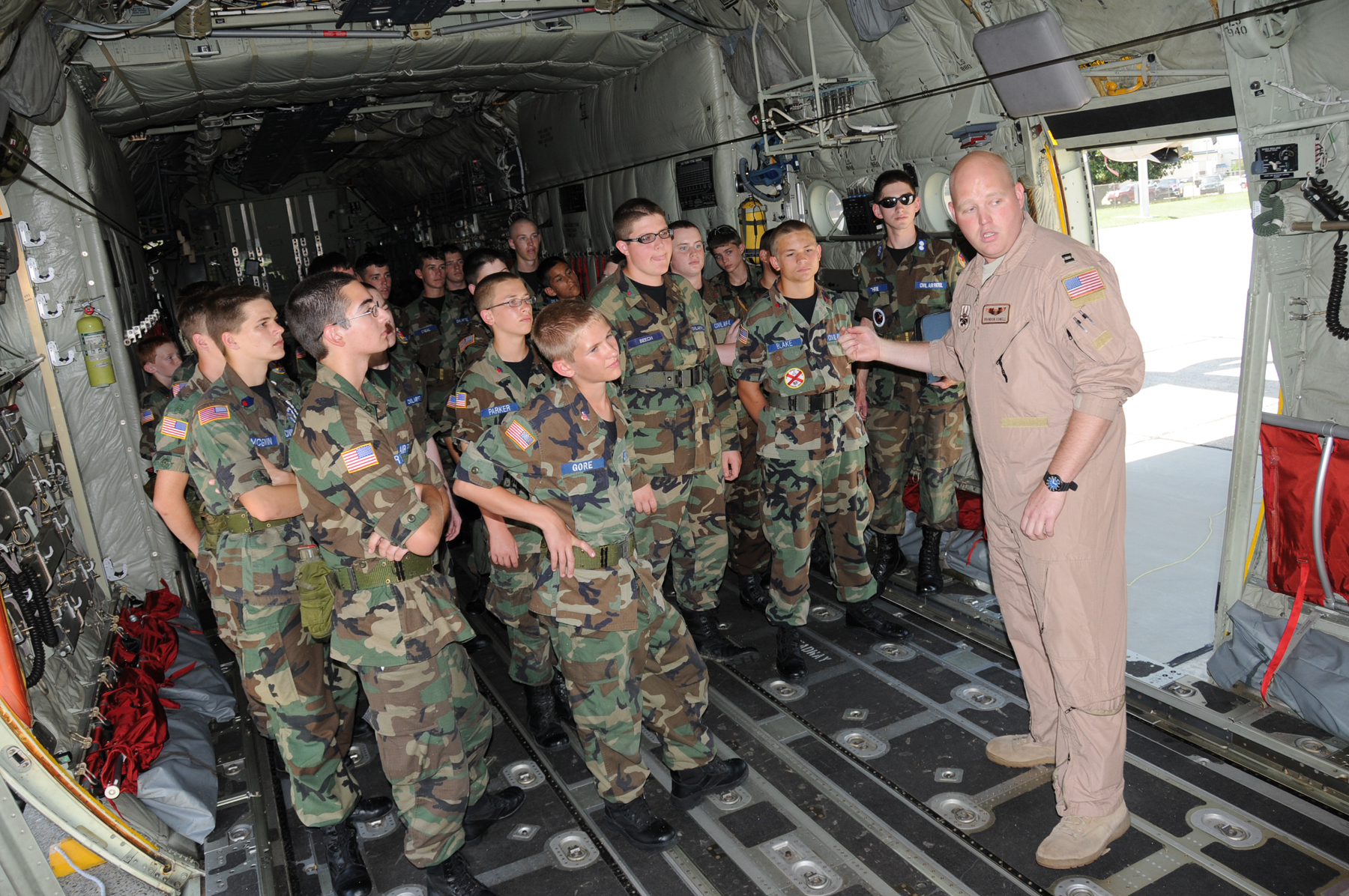
Capt. Brandon Cowell, right, 815th Airlift Squadron, gives a tour of a C-130J model aircraft to a group of Mississippi Civil Air Patrol cadets.

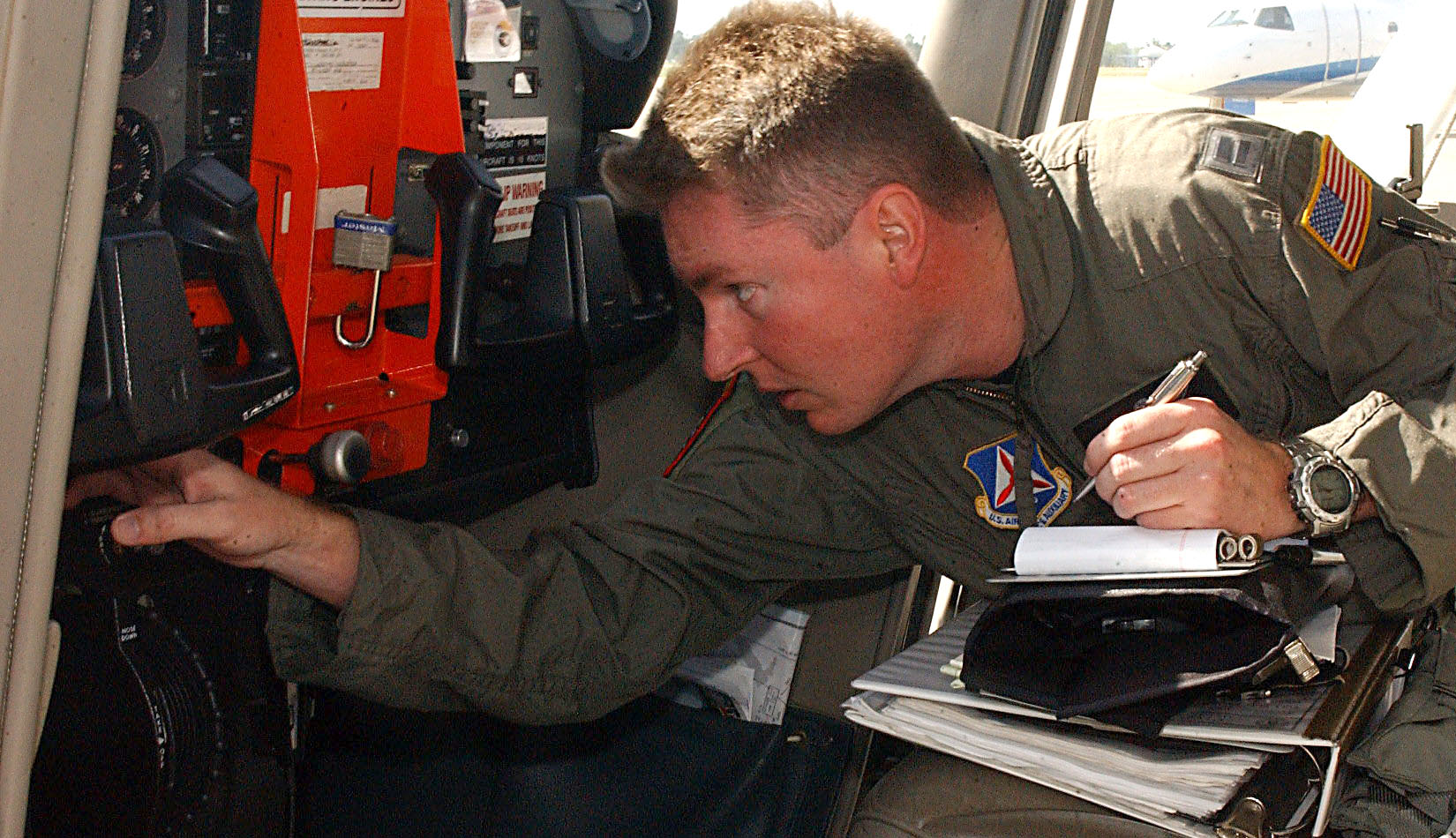
Captain Riddle performs a preflight inspection of a Cessna 172 Skyhawk at the Gulfport-Biloxi International Airport.

Squadrons of the Mississippi Wing
Designation	Squadron Name	Location	Notes	Commander
MS048	Col Berta A. Edge Composite Squadron	Biloxi		Maj James Samans
MS050	Steve Launius Composite Squadron	Oxford	Currently inactive	
MS051	Singing River Senior Squadron	Pascagoula		Lt Col Kim Gibson
MS056	Alcorn County Composite Flight	Corinth		Capt Harvern Davis Jr.
MS057	Golden Triangle Composite Squadron	Columbus		1st Lt Dakota Raduenz
MS066	Diamondhead Senior Squadron	Diamondhead		1st Lt Monte David
MS072	Pine Belt Composite Squadron	Hattiesburg		Capt. Jonathan Decker
MS075	Pike County Composite Squadron	McComb		Maj Shane Hinckley
MS096	DeSoto Composite Squadron	Southaven		Capt Michael Losey
MS099	Tupelo Eagle Composite Squadron	Tupelo		1st Lt Pat Wooten
MS100	Central Mississippi Composite Squadron	Jackson		Maj William Harris
MS102	G.V. Montgomery Composite Squadron	Meridian	Currently inactive	
MS109	Vicksburg Composite Squadron	Vicksburg		TSgt Caleb Roberts
MS110	Charles S. Metcalf Cleveland Composite Squadron	Cleveland	Currently inactive	
MS111	Madison Cadet Squadron	Madison		1st Lt Jason Mann
MS112	John Tilton Senior Squadron	Raymond	Currently inactive	
MS601	George County Cadet Flight	Lucedale		1st Lt Anna Scudder
MS999	Mississippi Legislative Squadron	Jackson		n/a

== See also ==
- Mississippi Air National Guard
- Mississippi State Guard
