= Mississippi Air National Guard =

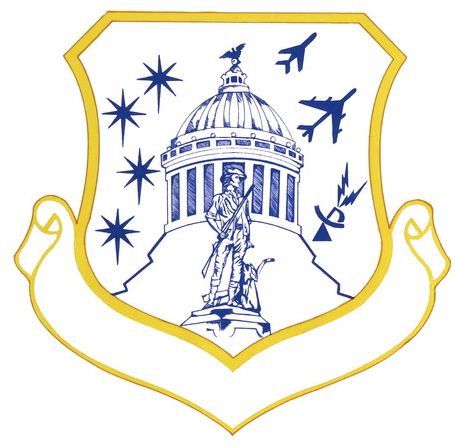
- Emblem of Headquarters, Mississippi Air National Guard
- Active: 1939–present
- Country: United States
- Allegiance: Mississippi
- Branch: Air National Guard
- Type: State militia, military reserve force
- Role: "To meet state and federal mission responsibilities"
- Part of: Mississippi National Guard; United States National Guard Bureau
- Headquarters: Jackson, Mississippi

Commanders
- Civilian leadership: President Donald Trump (Commander-in-Chief); Troy Meink (Secretary of the Air Force); Governor Tate Reeves (Governor of Mississippi)
- Major General: Major General Edward H. Evans Jr., MS ANG

Insignia
- Abbreviation: MS ANG

Aircraft flown
- Transport: C-17 Globemaster III
- Tanker: KC-135 Stratotanker

The Mississippi Air National Guard (MS ANG), commonly known as the Mississippi Air Guard, is the aerial militia of the State of Mississippi, United States of America. It is a reserve of the United States Air Force and along with the Mississippi Army National Guard, an element of the Mississippi National Guard of the larger United States National Guard Bureau.

As state militia units, the units in the Mississippi Air National Guard are not in the normal United States Air Force chain of command. They are under the jurisdiction of the governor of Mississippi though the office of the Mississippi Adjutant General unless they are federalized by order of the president of the United States. The Mississippi Air National Guard is headquartered in Jackson, and its commander is currently Major General Edward H. Evans, Jr.

== Overview ==
Under the "Total Force" concept, Mississippi Air National Guard units are considered to be Air Reserve Components (ARC) of the United States Air Force (USAF). Mississippi ANG units are trained and equipped by the Air Force and are operationally gained by a major command of the USAF if federalized. In addition, the Mississippi Air National Guard forces are assigned to Air Expeditionary Forces and are subject to deployment tasking orders along with their active duty and Air Force Reserve counterparts in their assigned cycle deployment window.

Along with their federal reserve obligations, as state militia units the elements of the Mississippi ANG are subject to being activated by order of the governor to provide protection of life and property, and preserve peace, order and public safety. State missions include disaster relief in times of earthquakes, hurricanes, floods and forest fires, search and rescue, protection of vital public services, and support to civil defense.

== Components ==
The Mississippi Air National Guard consists of the following major units:

- 172d Airlift Wing

Established 1 July 1953 (as: 183d Tactical Reconnaissance Squadron); operates: C-17 Globemaster III
Stationed at: Allen C. Thompson Air National Guard Base Field, Jackson
Gained by: Air Mobility Command
The 172nd Airlift Wing operates the C-17 Globemaster III, and has participated in an all-volunteer mobilization and activation since 2005, flying weekly missions into harm's way to return wounded patients of the Total Force safely back to the U.S.

- 186th Air Refueling Wing

Established 27 Sepatember 1939 (as: 153d Observation Squadron); operates: KC-135R Stratotanker and C-26 Metroliner
Stationed at: Key Field Air National Guard Base, Meridian
Gained by: Air Mobility Command
The 186th ARW provides worldwide air refueling support to major commands of the United States Air Force, as well as other U.S. military forces and the military forces of allied nations flying the KC-135 Stratotanker.

Support Unit Functions and Capabilities:

- 238th Air Support Operations Squadron, Meridian
- 248th Combat Airfield Operations Squadron, Meridian
- Gulfport Combat Readiness Training Center, Gulfport
- 255th Air Control Squadron, Gulfport
- Shelby Auxiliary Field #1, adjacent to Camp Shelby in Hattiesburg
- 209th Special Operations Civil Engineer Squadron

== History ==
The Militia Act of 1903 established the present National Guard system, units raised by the states but paid for by the Federal Government, liable for immediate state service. If federalized by Presidential order, they fall under the regular military chain of command. On 1 June 1920, the Militia Bureau issued Circular No.1 on organization of National Guard air units.

The Mississippi Air National Guard origins date to 18 August 1939 with the establishment of the 153d Observation Squadron and is oldest unit of the Mississippi Air National Guard. It is one of the 29 original National Guard Observation Squadrons of the United States Army National Guard formed before World War II. The 153d Observation Squadron was ordered into active service on 15 October 1940 as part of the buildup of the Army Air Corps prior to the United States entry into World War II.

On 24 May 1946, the United States Army Air Forces, in response to dramatic postwar military budget cuts imposed by President Harry S. Truman, allocated inactive unit designations to the National Guard Bureau for the formation of an Air Force National Guard. These unit designations were allotted and transferred to various State National Guard bureaus to provide them unit designations to re-establish them as Air National Guard units.

The modern Mississippi ANG received federal recognition on 12 September 1946 as the 153d Fighter Squadron at Key Field, Meridian. It was equipped with F-47 Thunderbolts and its mission was the air defense of the state. 18 September 1947, however, is considered the Mississippi Air National Guard's official birth concurrent with the establishment of the United States Air Force as a separate branch of the United States military under the National Security Act.

A second Mississippi ANG unit, the 183d Tactical Reconnaissance Squadron, was organized and federally recognized at Hawkins Field, Jackson and extended recognition as a new unit on 1 July 1953.

On 15 October 1962 the 153d Tactical Reconnaissance Squadron was authorized to expand to a group level, and the 186th Tactical Reconnaissance Group was allotted by the National Guard Bureau, extended federal recognition and activated. On 1 July 1965 the 183d Air Transport Squadron was authorized to expand to a group level, and the 172d Air Transport Group was federally recognized at Jackson.

Today, the 172d Airlift Wing (172d AW) flies weekly missions into harm's way to return wounded patients of the Total Force safely back to the U.S. The 186th Air Refueling Wing (186 ARW) provides worldwide air refueling support to major commands of the United States Air Force, as well as other U.S. military forces and the military forces of allied nations.

After the September 11th, 2001 terrorist attacks on the United States, elements of every Air National Guard unit in Mississippi has been activated in support of the global war on terrorism. Flight crews, aircraft maintenance personnel, communications technicians, air controllers and air security personnel were engaged in Operation Noble Eagle air defense overflights of major United States cities. Also, Mississippi ANG units have been deployed overseas as part of Operation Enduring Freedom in Afghanistan and Operation Iraqi Freedom in Iraq as well as other locations as directed.

== Notable members ==
- Sheri Biggs
- Wayne Burkes
- Stacey Pickering
- John H. Stennis
- Shad White

== See also ==
- Mississippi Military Department
- Mississippi National Guard
- Mississippi State Guard
- Mississippi Wing Civil Air Patrol
