= 172nd Airlift Wing =

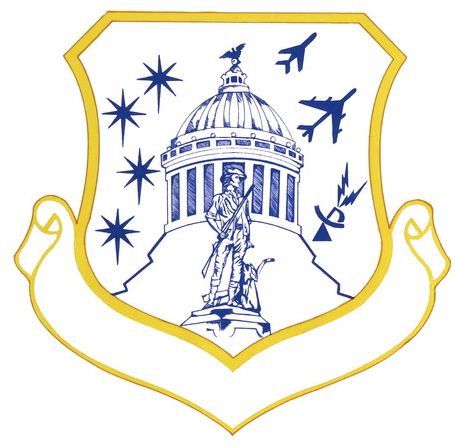
172nd Airlift Wing

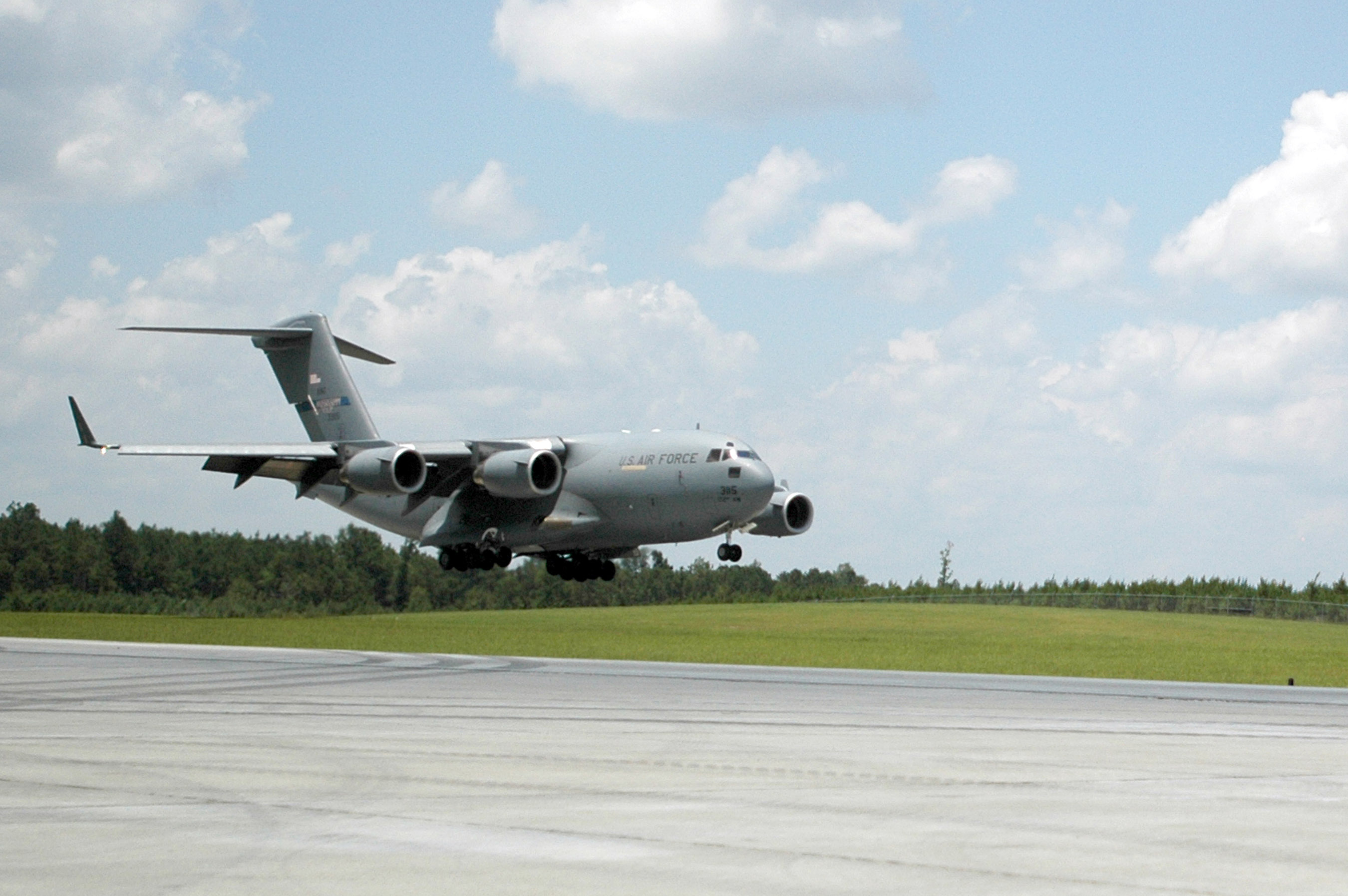
- 172nd Wing C-17 Globemaster III at Camp Shelby Auxiliary Field
- Active: 1 July 1965 – present
- Country: United States
- Allegiance: Mississippi
- Branch: Air National Guard
- Type: Wing
- Role: Airlift
- Part of: Mississippi Air National Guard
- Garrison/HQ: Allen C. Thompson ANGB Field, Jackson, Mississippi
- Nickname: Wings of the Deep South
- Mottos: By Faith and Courage

Commanders
- Current commander: Colonel John L. Wilkinson

Insignia
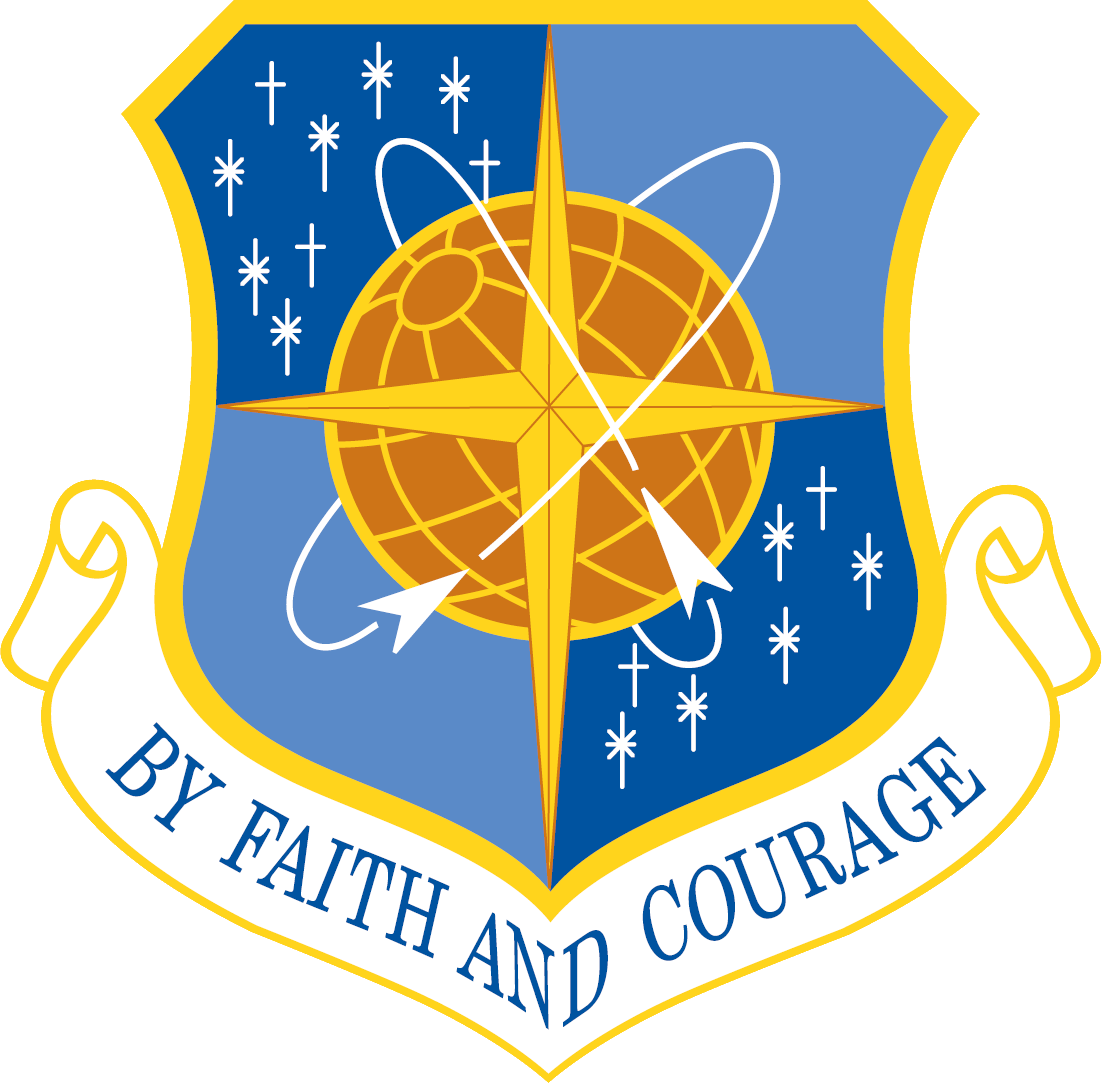
- 172nd Airlift Wing emblem

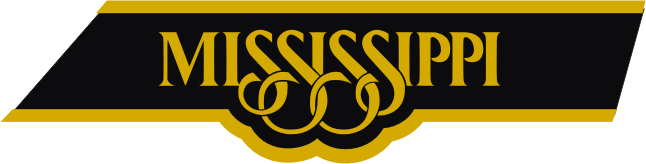
- Tail stripe

The 172nd Airlift Wing is a unit of the Mississippi Air National Guard, stationed at Allen C. Thompson Field Air National Guard Base, Mississippi. If activated to federal service, the Wing is gained by the United States Air Force Air Mobility Command. The wing operates the Boeing C-17 Globemaster III, and has participated in an all-volunteer partial activation since 2005, flying weekly missions to return wounded patients of the military safely back to the United States. Also, the 172nd Airlift Wing provides the State of Mississippi support in the event of national emergency, maintains peace and order, and supports civil defense and pre-attack planning. Media related to 172d Airlift Wing (Mississippi Air National Guard) at Wikimedia Commons

== Units ==
The 172nd Airlift Wing consists of the following units:

- 172nd Operations Group
  - 183rd Airlift Squadron
  - 183rd Aeromedical Evacuation Squadron
  - 172 Airlift Control Flight
  - 172 Operations Support Flight
- 172nd Maintenance Group
  - 172d Aircraft Maintenance Squadron
  - 172d Maintenance Squadron
  - 172d Maintenance Ops Flight
  - Det 18, MTF
- 172nd Mission Support Group
  - 209th Special Operations Civil Engineer Squadron
  - 172d Communications Flight
  - 172d Security Forces Squadron
  - 172 Force Support Squadron
  - 172 Civil Engineer Squadron
  - 172 Logistics Readiness Squadron
- 172nd Medical Group

== History ==
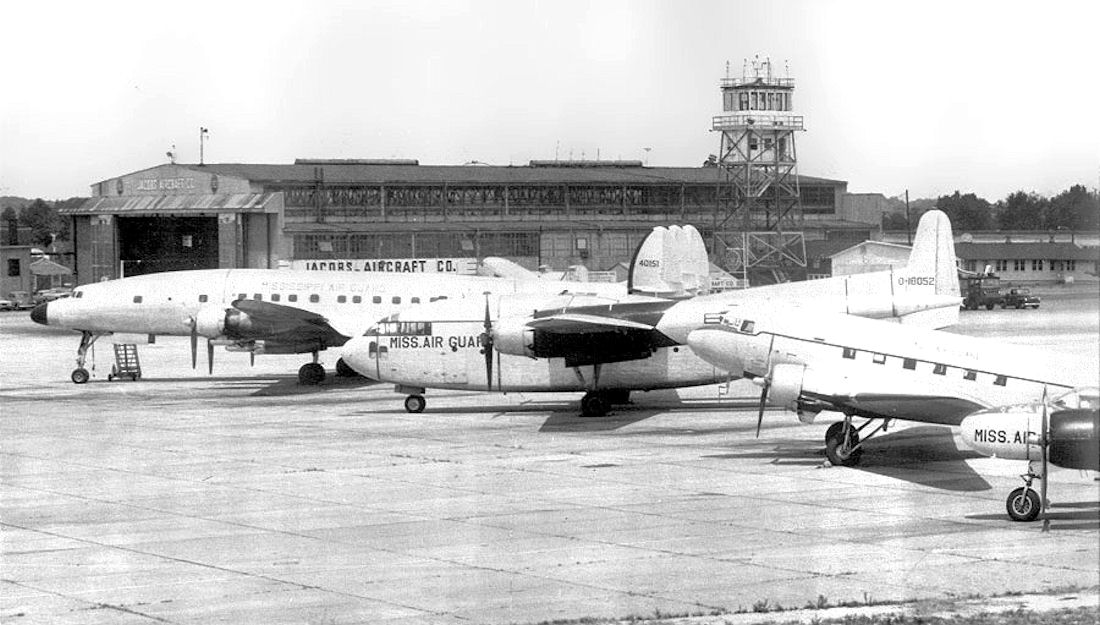
C-121, C-119 and C-46 at Hawkins Field

In December 1963, the Mississippi 183rd Air Transport Squadron was authorized to expand into a group which would include the 183rd and supporting organizations, and the 172nd Air Transport Group was established. The 183rd became the new group's flying squadron. The support units assigned into the group were the 183rd Material Squadron, 183rd Air Base Squadron, and the 183rd USAF Dispensary. Flying Lockheed C-121 Constellations at the time of its activation, the group soon converted to Douglas C-124C Globemaster II heavy intercontinental airlift aircraft in 1966 which meant supplies and equipment could be carried around the world along with the personnel the Constellations could carry.

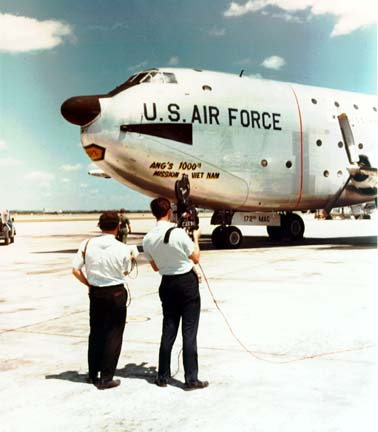
183rd Military Airlift Squadron C-124 Globemaster II in South Vietnam (Note: Photographed on the occasion of the 1,000th Air National Guard flight to Vietnam.)

The C-124 was being retired in the early 1970s and the 172nd airlift mission was changed to theater support, as it equipped with Lockheed C-130E Hercules aircraft in May 1972. It upgraded to new C-130H aircraft in 1980 and continued to fly tactical airlift missions until the mid-1980s. On 12 July 1986 the group returned to the strategic airlift role when the first Lockheed C-141B Starlifter to be released from active-duty Air Force control was assigned. With a total of eight aircraft, the unit began its new mission.

In March 1988 the 172nd took part in the airlift of approximately 3200 troops and almost 1000 tons of cargo on an exercise to Palmerola Air Base, Honduras. The 172nd was the only Air National Guard unit that participated in this airlift to Honduras. On 6 December 1988 the Soviet Republic of Armenia suffered a powerful earthquake. The first Air Guard aircraft to fly to Armenia was a C-141B from the 172nd. Before relief missions ended, the 172nd flew six missions with its own planes and crew and furnished a crew to fly a United States Air Force C-141 whose crew could not continue because they had reached the maximum number flying hours to continue safe operations. In September 1989 a devastating hurricane struck the tiny island of St. Croix, leaving the island crippled. The 172nd flew eleven emergency relief missions, hauling 465 tons of cargo and 472 passengers.

From 20 December 1989 to 12 January 1990 the 172nd flew 21 sorties in support of Operation Just Cause, the incursion into Panama to replace Manuel Noriega as ruler. Cargo transported during the operation amounted to 403.6 tons and 1,274 passengers were airlifted. On 7 August 1990 the 172nd's support of Operations Desert Shield and Desert Storm began when aircrew members started flying voluntary missions. Approximately 98 aircrew members flew these missions before 24 August 1990, when the 183rd Military Airlift Squadron was activated. The 183rd was one of the first two reserve and guard units to be activated. By May 1991 the 148 members of the 183rd had flown 2,880 sorties which transported 15,837 passengers and 25,949.2 tons of cargo.

In 2000, the C-141C with electronic "glass cockpit" was phased into service with the group. In October 2000 after the USS Cole bombing in Aden, seventeen members of the 172nd deployed to Ramstein Air Base Germany. Members of the 183rd Aeromedical Evacuation and 183rd Airlift Squadrons picked up four sailors from Ramstein and flew them home to Norfolk Naval Station. In February 2003 the 172nd retired its last C-141C Starlifter in preparation for the arrival of the wing's first Boeing C-17 Globemaster III.

On 17 December 2003, Lt. Gen. Daniel James III, Director, Air National Guard, handed off the "keys" to the first Globemaster III to Maj. Gen. James H. Lipscomb III, adjutant general of the Mississippi National Guard. The plane was the first Globemaster III assigned to the Air National Guard and was named the "Spirit of the Minutemen".

== Lineage ==
- Established as the 172nd Air Transport Group, Heavy and allotted to the Air National Guard on 16 December 1963

Activated in December 1963 and extended federal recognition
Redesignated 172nd Military Airlift Group on 1 January 1966
Redesignated 172nd Tactical Airlift Group on 30 June 1972
Redesignated 172nd Military Airlift Group on 1 July 1986
Redesignated 172nd Airlift Group on 16 March 1992
Redesignated 172nd Airlift Wing on 1 October 1995

=== Assignments ===
- Mississippi Air National Guard, 1 July 1965 – Present

Gaining commands
Military Air Transport Service, December 1963
Military Airlift Command, 1 January 1966
Air Mobility Command, 1 June 1992 - present

=== Components ===
- 172nd Operations Group, 1 October 1995 – present
- 183rd Air Transport Squadron (later 183rd Military Airlift Squadron, 183rd Tactical Airlift Squadron, 183rd Military Airlift Squadron, 183rd Airlift Squadron), December 1963 – 1 October 1995

=== Stations ===
- Hawkins Field, December 1963
- Allen C, Thompson Field (later Allen C. Thompson Field Air National Guard Base), Mississippi, 1 July 1965

Elements operated from: Charleston Air Force Base, South Carolina, 24 August 1990 – 30 May 1991

=== Aircraft ===
- Lockheed C-121 Constellation, 1963-1966
- Douglas C-124C Globemaster II, 1966-1972
- Lockheed C-130E Hercules, 1972-1980
- Lockheed C-130H Hercules, 1980-1986
- Lockheed C-141B Starlifter, 1986-2000
- Lockheed C-141C Starlifter, 2000-2004
- Boeing C-17 Globemaster III, 2004–Present
