= Joseph Lutz (general) =

United States Army general

Joseph "Joe" Lutz
- Born: April 17, 1933; Indianapolis, Indiana
- Died: May 9, 1999; Clearwater, Florida
- Occupation(s): Major General 2 Star, US Army
- Spouse: Joyce Lutz

Major General Joseph "Joe" Lutz (April 17, 1933 – May 9, 1999) was a two star general in the United States Army. He played an important role in getting increased recognition for Special Operations in the U.S. Military.

== Early life ==
Joseph Lutz was born April 17, 1933, in Indianapolis Indiana. An All-State Tail Back for Cathedral High School, he accepted a scholarship to St. Norbert College where he earned Catholic League All-American Honors at the same position. His designation as the Distinguished Military Graduate of the Army Reserve Officer Training Corps program at St. Norbert College in 1955 was a sign of things to come. After his required 4 years of service, he was offered tryouts with the Green Bay Packers and Pittsburgh Steelers, but opted to continue his Military Service.

== Personal life ==
Joseph Lutz was the son of Frank Lutz and Marie Bender. He married Joyce Anne Cunningham (4/1/1933 - February 26, 2008) on February 7, 1959, in Indianapolis Indiana. They had five children.

Joseph Lutz died on May 9, 1999, in Clearwater Beach, Florida.
