= Jackson–Medgar Wiley Evers International Airport =

Airport serving Jackson, Mississippi, US

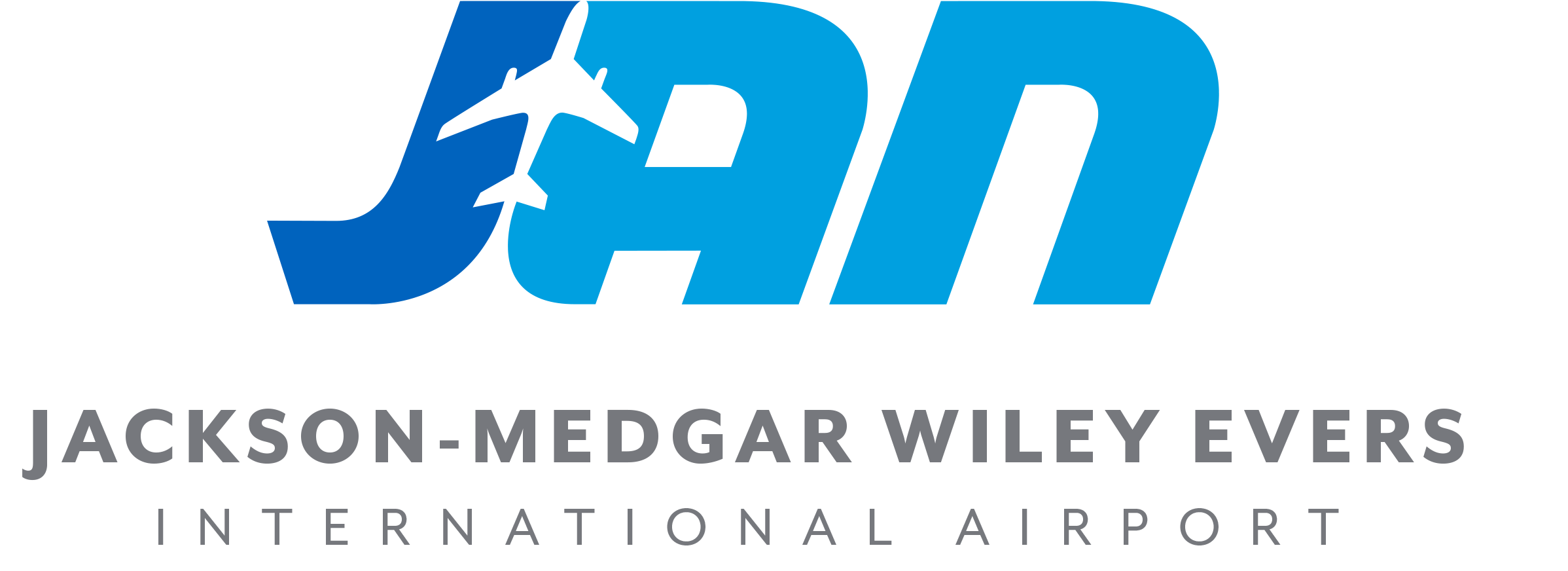
- IATA: JAN; ICAO: KJAN; FAA LID: JAN

Summary
- Airport type: Public
- Owner: City of Jackson
- Operator: Jackson Municipal Airport Authority
- Serves: Jackson metropolitan area
- Location: Jackson, Mississippi, U.S. Rankin County, Mississippi, U.S.
- Elevation AMSL: 346 ft (105 m)
- Coordinates: 32°18′40″N 090°04′33″W
- Website: jmaa.com

Maps
- FAA Airport Diagram as of January 2021
- Interactive map of Jackson–Medgar Wiley Evers International Airport

Runways
Direction	Length		Surface
Direction	ft	m	Surface
16L/34R	8,500	2,591	Asphalt
16R/34L	8,500	2,591	Asphalt

Statistics (2019)
- Aircraft operations: 51,185
- Based aircraft: 36
- Sources: and FAA

Jackson–Medgar Wiley Evers International Airport (IATA: JAN, ICAO: KJAN, FAA LID: JAN) is a city-owned civil-military airport located in Jackson, Mississippi, United States, approximately 6 miles (9.7 km) east of Downtown Jackson across the Pearl River. It is located in Rankin County between the suburbs of Flowood and Pearl, whereas the majority of the city of Jackson is located in Hinds County.

It serves commercial, private, and military aviation. It is named after Medgar Evers, the assassinated Mississippi Field Secretary for the NAACP during much of the Civil rights movement, and is administered by the Jackson Municipal Airport Authority (JMAA), which also oversees aviation activity at Hawkins Field (HKS) in northwest Jackson.

In March 2011, the Jackson–Evers International Airport was ranked the 8th-best airport in a worldwide consumer survey conducted by Airports Council International (ACI). It was the only airport in the United States to be ranked in the top ten.

== History ==
Groundbreaking for the new airport occurred on August 17, 1959, beginning construction that was expected to take two years. The expansion was expected to cost $6 million (equivalent to $66,000,000 in 2025). At the opening ceremony, mayor Allen C. Thompson got a laugh when he thanked the people who had anything to do with the airport in the past, and "the taxpayers who are going to pay for it" in the future. The airport opened in 1963, a new airport to replace Hawkins Field, Jackson's airport since 1928. Delta Air Lines' first flight, from Dallas Love Field, landed at Hawkins Field in 1929. The new airport was named Allen C. Thompson Field (after the Mayor of Jackson at the time, who was instrumental in obtaining the land for the airfield), which remains the name for the land on which the airport is built. The airport was "Jackson Municipal Airport".

Following a decision by the Jackson City Council in December 2004, the airport name was changed to Jackson–Evers International Airport on January 22, 2005.

=== Past air service ===
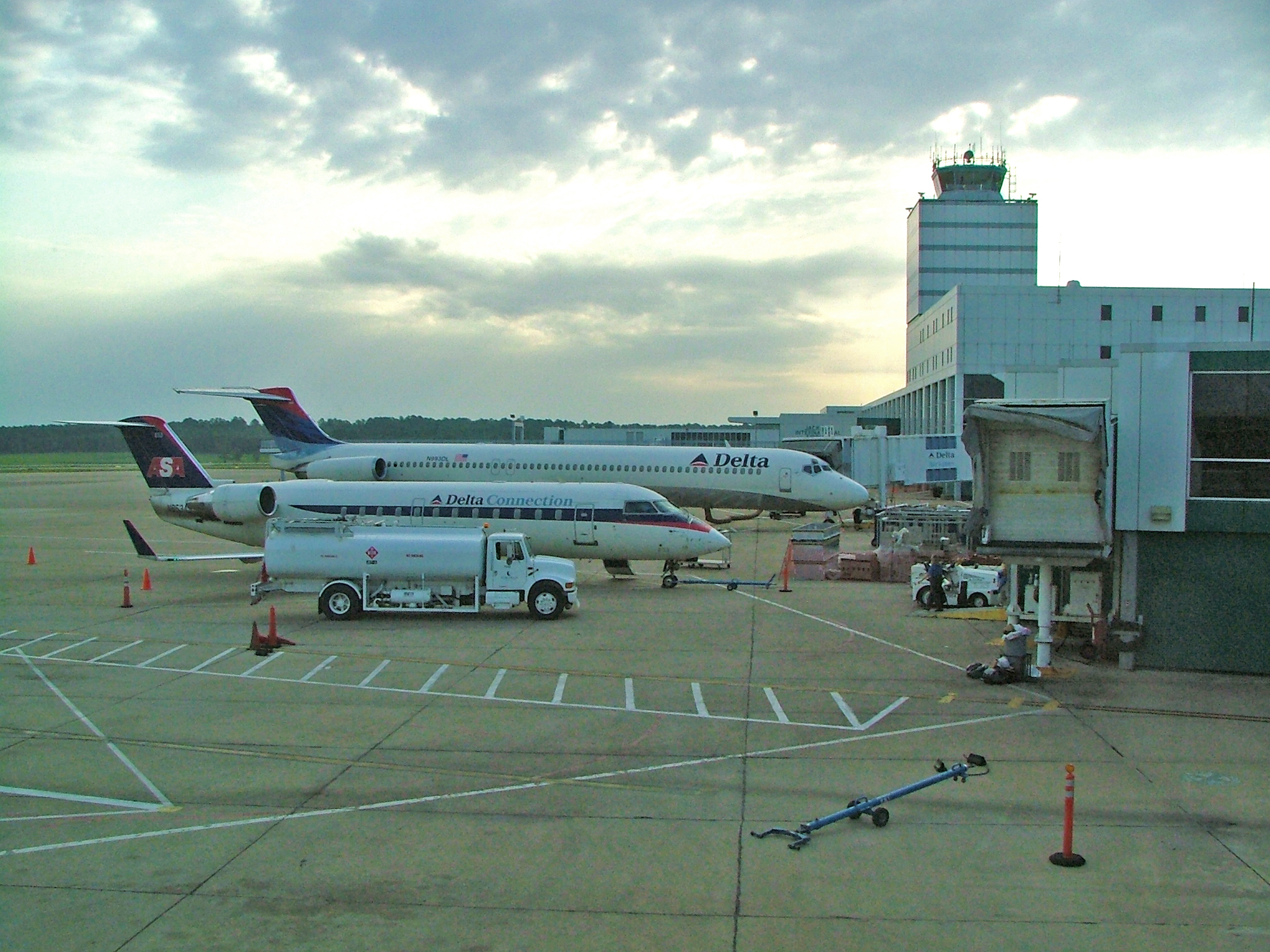
Looking east from the West Concourse, July 2005

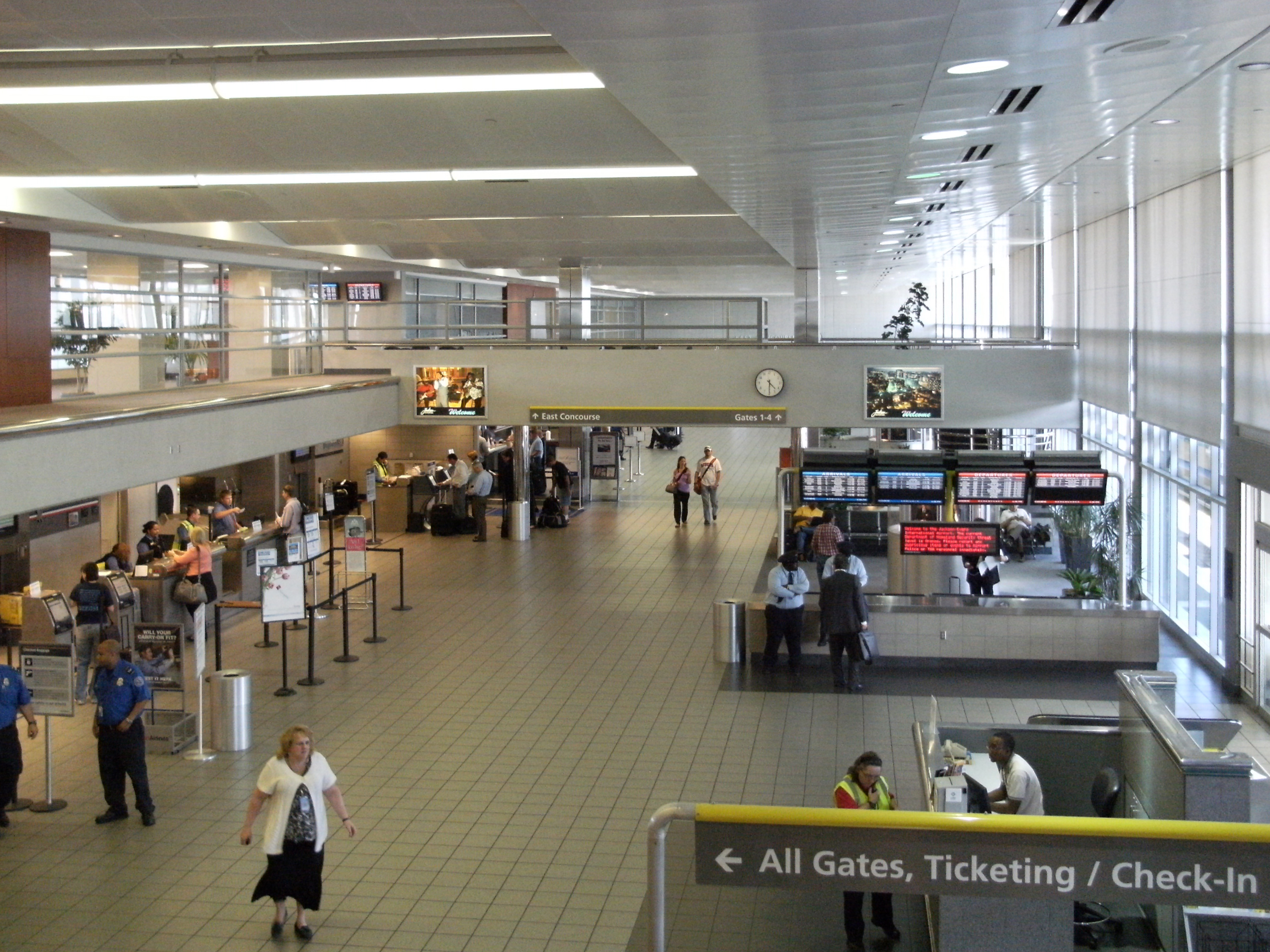
Jackson–Medgar Wiley Evers International Airport departures and ticketing hall

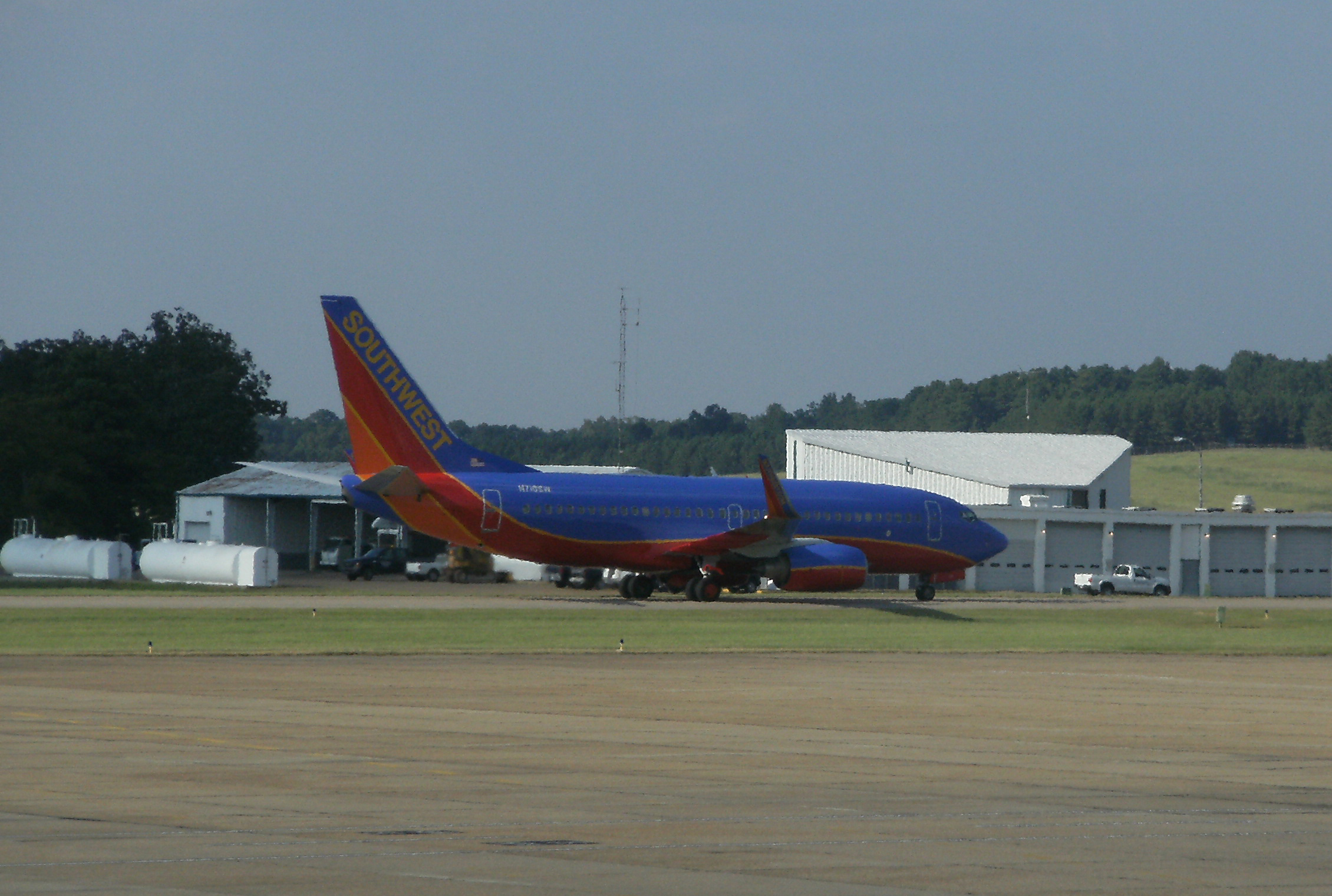
Southwest 737 at Jackson, Sept 2010

For decades, Delta was the primary air carrier to serve Jackson, from the airline's inception in the 1920s. The first jets scheduled to Jackson were Delta Convair 880s in late 1963, Newark-Birmingham-Jackson-Shreveport-Dallas and back. In 1973 Delta Boeing 727s flew nonstop to Atlanta, Birmingham, Dallas/Ft. Worth, Monroe (LA), Montgomery (AL), Memphis, Meridian (MS), New Orleans, and Shreveport, which continued for some time afterward. In the mid-1980s, Delta 727s and McDonnell Douglas DC-9s flew nonstop to Atlanta, Dallas/Ft Worth, Memphis, Mobile, Monroe, and Shreveport. In October 1991 Delta had nonstop 727s, DC-9s and McDonnell Douglas MD-88s to its hubs in Atlanta, Cincinnati, and Dallas/Ft Worth, in addition to Baton Rouge, Birmingham, Monroe, and Shreveport. This was augmented between 1993 and 1998 by Delta Boeing 757s to Atlanta, Birmingham, and Dallas/Ft Worth, the largest commercial jets possible for the airport runways to accommodate. Delta reduced its flights thereafter: by 2004 Delta flew to just Atlanta and Cincinnati, the latter only through subsidiary Comair, and since 2013 it has served only Atlanta directly from Jackson.

In the 1960s Southern Airways Martin 404s connected Jackson with Natchez, Vicksburg, Greenwood, Columbus, Laurel, and New Orleans, but in the next decade Southern replaced these with DC-9s. In the 1970s Southern flew to Memphis, Atlanta, Greenville, Mississippi and Mobile, but after it merged with North Central Airlines in 1979 to form Republic Airlines it flew only to Memphis and left completely by 1984. In the 1970s Jackson had direct Convair 600s to Houston–Intercontinental, Alexandria, Louisiana, and Baton Rouge on Texas International Airlines. Air Illinois also provided service to New Orleans, Memphis and Natchez in the late 1970s.

In 1979 Frontier Airlines flew Boeing 737s direct to Little Rock, with connections to Denver and the rest of the airline's network. Royale Airlines flew Gulfstream turboprops to Natchez and New Orleans. Between 1984 and 1986, Eastern Airlines had nonstop 727s to Atlanta and New Orleans; United Airlines flew 737s to Memphis, a route later taken over by Northwest with Saab 340s; Northwest also started direct turboprops to Laurel/Hattiesburg and later started Jackson–New Orleans. A Continental Airlines affiliate began turboprop flights to Houston–Intercontinental, which continued through June 2013 (now part of United, using regional jets). In 1981 American Airlines began direct flights to Dallas/Ft. Worth, Mobile, and later Nashville, using MD-83s and Boeing 727s.

In the early 1990s the airport's name became "Jackson International Airport" since it has facilities for international flights (of which it has none scheduled). It has an office for U.S. Customs to service international arrivals and has established a Foreign Trade Zone. The airport also saw US Airways as a new carrier during this time, gaining nonstop service to Charlotte and for a time, to New Orleans. Trans World Airlines began Trans World Express service to St. Louis in 1995; this ended the next year. TWA had DC-9, often DC-9-10, service to STL in 1996. Low-cost Valujet began DC-9 flights from Jackson to Atlanta in 1994, lasting for two years before it filed for bankruptcy and became AirTran Airways in 1997. The mid-1990s saw a tightening in the airline industry of the hub-and-spoke system, and many destinations from Jackson were eliminated. American downgraded service in 1995 from Jackson to American Eagle service only to Dallas/Ft. Worth and Nashville, and later only to DFW.

In 1997 Southwest Airlines began service to Jackson from Baltimore, Chicago–Midway, Houston–Hobby and Orlando; Southwest flew its last flight from Jackson on June 7, 2014. On October 22, 2020, Southwest Airlines announced that it would be returning to Jackson in the first half of 2021.

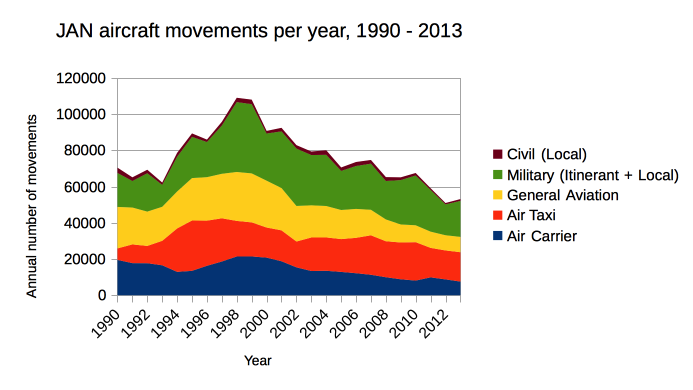
Aircraft movements per year at JAN (1990-2013, inclusive). Data from FAA.

=== Recent air service ===
In 2013, the airport saw 7,520 commercial aircraft (about 20 commercial aircraft per day) and 53,096 aircraft overall.

In 2006, the airport authority received a federal grant (Small Community Air Service Development) to recruit non-stop flight service to Newark, in the New York City area. Continental Airlines flights from Jackson to Newark began on September 25, 2007; the route ended in summer 2008. American Airlines non-stop service between Chicago–O'Hare and Jackson–Evers recently ended, though the route was resumed by United Airlines in December 2020.

In late 2018, Frontier Airlines started non-stop seasonal service to Orlando International Airport and Denver International Airport. They are the only airline to schedule the Airbus A320 family to Jackson.

The 172d Airlift Wing (172 AW) of the Mississippi Air National Guard has maintained an Air National Guard base on the airport since 1963, when it moved from Hawkins Field. The 172 AW previously operated the C-119 Flying Boxcar, C-124 Globemaster, C-130 Hercules, C-141 Starlifter and now flies the C-17 Globemaster III.

== Airport operations ==
Previously, the city of Jackson, like other Mississippi cities, had control of the airport through the Jackson Municipal Airport Authority, controlled by a board with five people. Governor of Mississippi Phil Bryant signed Senate Bill 2162 into law in 2016 to give control to a new board of nine people with two appointed by the city government. The Jackson airport board sued on the basis of racial discrimination as the city is majority black; the 5th U.S. Circuit Court of Appeals ruled against the Jackson board in August 2019. People supporting the takeover argued that the municipalities next to the airport should have power over its governance.

== Facilities ==
The airport is within a non-contiguous portion of the Jackson city limits, and in Rankin County. The airport has an L-shaped terminal, with the ramp extending north. The west concourse, with gates 15–19, extends nearly straight from the central part of the terminal with ticket counters, while the east concourse (gates 1–4) extends north at the other end of the terminal building. In the 1980s, United Airlines operated flights from gate 6, almost directly behind the ticket counters; however, when the airport was renovated in the early 1990s, gate 6 was converted into an observation deck.

The Mississippi Musicians Hall of Fame museum is located at the airport.

The airport covers 3,381 acres (1,368 ha) at an elevation of 346 feet (105 m). It has two runways, 16L/34R and 16R/34L, each 8,500 ft × 150 ft (2,591 m × 46 m) asphalt.

Five new jetways were installed in February 2011: two on the east Concourse (gates 3 and 4) and three on the west Concourse (gates 15, 17, and 19). Recent improvements include a new covered garage for long-term parking.

== Airlines and destinations ==
Airlines	Destinations	Refs
American Eagle	Charlotte, Dallas/Fort Worth, Washington–National; Seasonal: Miami	
Delta Air Lines	Atlanta	
Delta Connection	Atlanta	
Southwest Airlines	Houston–Hobby, Nashville; Seasonal: Orlando	
United Express	Houston–Intercontinental	

== Statistics ==
=== Top destinations ===
Busiest domestic routes from Jackson-Evers International Airport (August 2025 – July 2026)
Rank	City	Passengers	Airline/s
1	Atlanta, Georgia	217,050	Delta
2	Dallas/Fort Worth, Texas	108,380	American
3	Houston–Intercontinental, Texas	69,860	United
4	Houston–Hobby, Texas	63,880	Southwest
5	Charlotte, North Carolina	56,210	American
6	Nashville, Tennessee	39,100	Southwest
7	Washington–National, D.C.	13,360	American
8	Baltimore, Maryland	12,830	Southwest
9	Orlando, Florida	1,060	Southwest
10	Miami, Florida	1,010	American

=== Airline Market Share ===
Largest Airlines at JAN (August 2025 – July 2026)
Rank	Airline	Passengers	Share
1	Delta Air Lines	353,000	30.32%
2	Southwest Airlines	237,000	20.42%
3	PSA Airlines	182,000	15.67%
4	CommuteAir	124,000	10.68%
5	Endeavor Air	79,000	6.79%
	Other Airlines	187,000	16.12%

== See also ==
- List of airports in Mississippi
