= Mississippi National Guard =

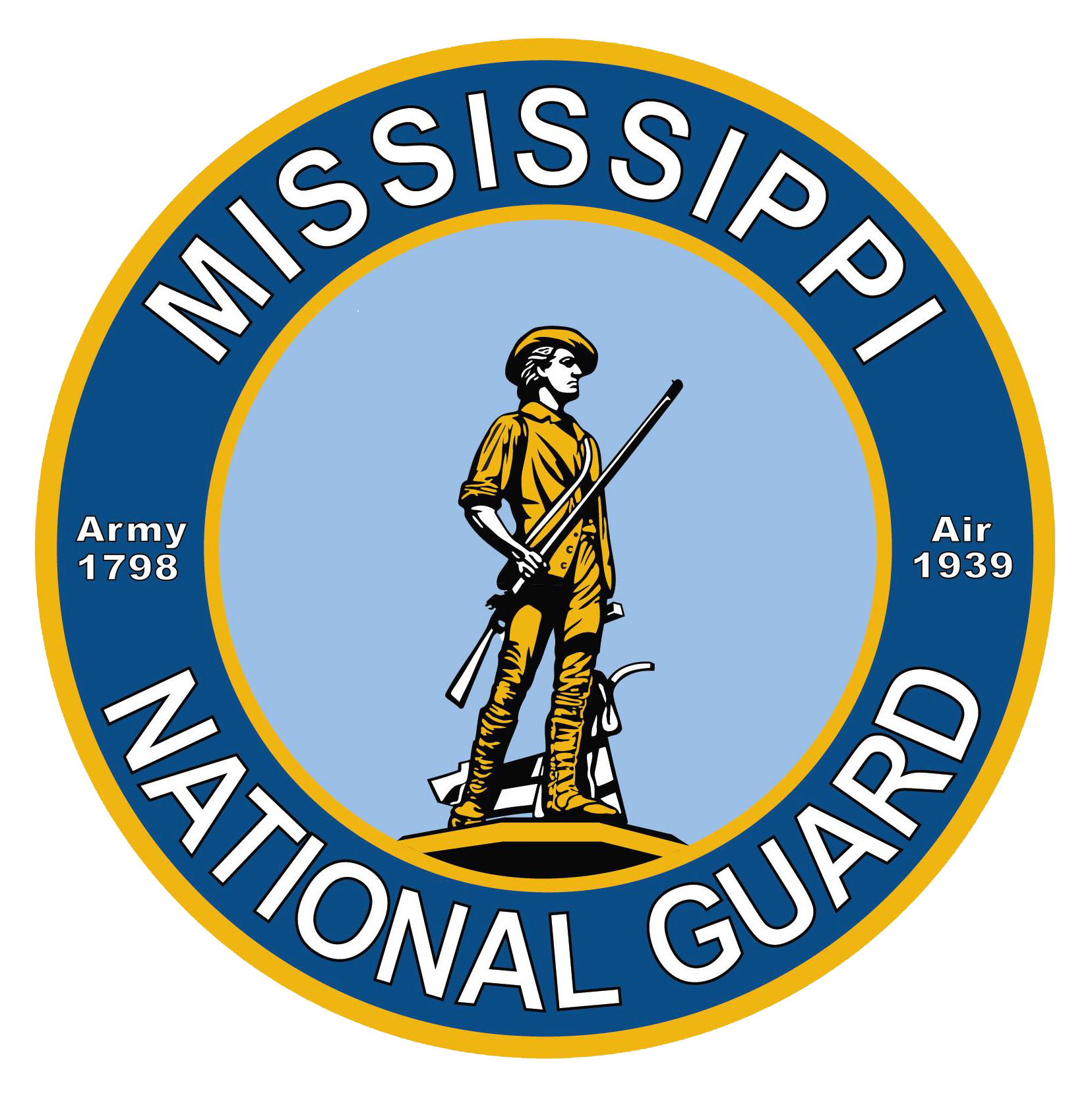
- Seal
- Active: 1798–present
- Country: United States
- Allegiance: Mississippi
- Type: National Guard
- Role: Organized militia Armed forces reserve
- Size: ~12,275 personnel
- Part of: Mississippi Military Department; National Guard of the United States
- Headquarters: Jackson, Mississippi
- Website: ng.ms.gov

Commanders
- Commander in Chief: Governor Tate Reeves
- Adjutant General of Mississippi: Major General Bobby M. Ginn Jr., MSARNG

Insignia
- Abbreviation: MSNG

The Mississippi National Guard (MSNG), commonly known as the Mississippi Guard, is both a Mississippi state and a federal government organization, part of the United States National Guard. It is part of the Mississippi Military Department, a state agency of the government of Mississippi. The Adjutant General of Mississippi (TAG), Major General Bobby Ginn, serves as the executive director and is subordinate to the Commander-in-Chief, the governor of Mississippi, in matters relating to the department and the state militia forces.

The Mississippi Code of 1972, Title 33, Chapter 3, titled "Military Affairs", details the duties and responsibilities of the Adjutant General of Mississippi. The Adjutant General of Mississippi, via the Mississippi Military Department, is expressly authorized to "issue such orders, rules and regulations as may be necessary in order that the organization, training and discipline of the components of the militia of this state will at all times conform to the applicable requirements of the United States government relating thereto. Orders, rules and regulations issued hereunder shall have full force and effect as part of the military code of this state".

The state militia forces formally break down into three broad classes: The Mississippi National Guard (MSNG), the Mississippi State Guard (MSSG), and the unorganized militia.

== Mission ==
The Constitution of the United States specifically charges the National Guard with dual federal and state missions. In fact, the National Guard is the only United States military force empowered to function in a state status. Those functions range from limited actions during non-emergency situations to full-scale law enforcement of martial law when local law enforcement officials can no longer maintain civil control. The National Guard may be called into federal service in response to a call by the president or Congress.

When National Guard troops are called to federal service, the president serves as commander-in-chief. The federal mission assigned to the National Guard is: "To provide properly trained and equipped units for prompt mobilization for war, National emergency or as otherwise needed." The governor may call individuals or units of the Mississippi National Guard into state service during emergencies or to assist in special situations which lend themselves to the use of the National Guard. The state mission assigned to the National Guard is: "To provide trained and disciplined forces for domestic emergencies or as otherwise provided by state law."

National Guard units can be mobilized at any time by presidential order to supplement regular armed forces, and upon declaration of a state of emergency by the governor of the state in which they serve. Unlike Army Reserve members, National Guard members cannot be mobilized individually (except through voluntary transfers and Temporary Duty Assignments TDY), but only as part of their respective units. However, there has been a significant number of individual activations to support military operations (2001-?); the legality of this policy is a major issue within the National Guard.

== History ==
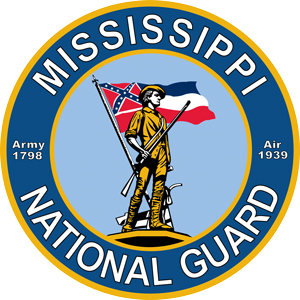
The Mississippi National Guard's former seal

During the Vietnam War, service in the National Guard was highly sought after. An enlistment in the Guard prevented a person from being sent to combat. In 1968, the Mississippi National Guard had 10,365 soldiers. At the time only 1% of them were black. At that time, the population of the state was more than forty percent black.

In November 2020, following the legislative retirement of the state flag of Mississippi in June, the National Guard changed their official seal for identification due to the old one containing the former flag.

In February 2024, a helicopter carrying two members of the national guard were killed when the helicopter crashed.

== Command structure ==
The Mississippi National Guard consists of the:

- Mississippi Army National Guard
- Mississippi Air National Guard
  - 172nd Airlift Wing
  - 186th Air Refueling Wing
  - Combat Readiness Training Center
  - 209th Civil Engineering Squadron
  - 238th Air Support Operations Squadron
  - 248th Air Traffic Control Squadron
  - 255th Air Control Squadron

=== Mississippi State Guard ===
Mississippi's state defense force, the Mississippi State Guard, is a military entity authorized by both the State Code of Mississippi and executive order. The State Guard is Mississippi's authorized militia which can assume, in whole or in part, the state mission of the Mississippi National Guard in the event the MS National Guard is federally mobilized and is regularly placed on state active duty alongside the MS National Guard in times of emergency. This force is federally recognized, but is not a component of the MS National Guard and cannot be federalized (Except in the case of naval components). The State Guard comprises retired and former active, reserve and National Guard military personnel, selected professional persons and ordinary citizens who volunteer their time and talents in further service to their state.
