= Mississippi State Guard =

State defense force in Mississippi, US

- Mississippi State Guard SSI

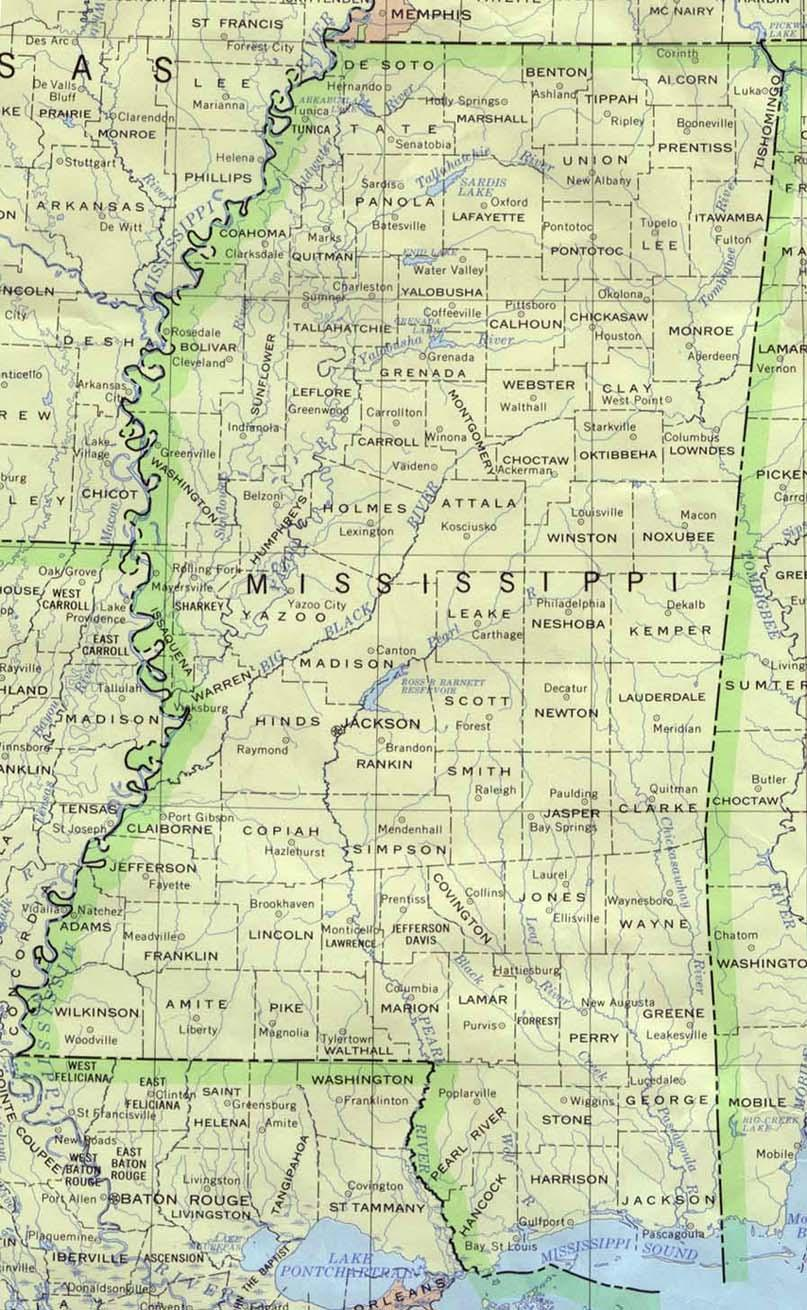
- Abbreviation: MSSG
- Formation: 1941
- Type: State defense force
- Legal status: Active
- Purpose: To serve the State of Mississippi in aid with, to or in lieu of the Mississippi National Guard
- Headquarters: 1410 Riverside Drive Jackson, Mississippi 39296
- Location: Mississippi
- Members: 100 +/-
- Commander-in-Chief: Gov. Tate Reeves
- Adjutant General: MG Bobby M. Ginn, Jr.
- MSSG Commanding General: John B. Carter, Brigadier General (MS) MSSG
- MSSG State Command Sergeant Major: Dennis Lautenbach, Command Sergeant Major (MS) MSSG
- Parent organization: Mississippi Military Department
- Affiliations: Mississippi Army National Guard, Mississippi Air National Guard
- Website: https://msstateguard.org/

The Mississippi State Guard (MSSG) is the state defense force of Mississippi. It operates under the authority of the Mississippi Military Department alongside the Mississippi Army National Guard (MSARNG) and the Mississippi Air National Guard (MSANG).

== History ==
The MSSG was initially established by executive order during World War II, after Mississippi National Guard units were called to federal active duty. In 1986, the United States Army adopted the "Total Force Concept" in which the National Guard of all states are trained as, and considered an integral part of the active duty forces of the United States military, though remaining under state control unless activated to federal service. The MSSG was re-activated and reorganized as a cadre force to augment the state's National Guard forces as necessary in the event of their federal deployment.

During WWII the Mississippi State Guard was mustered into service in November 1940. The Mississippi State Guard first came into being in the early part of 1941, by Executive Order of Governor Paul B. Johnson. The initial force was an Infantry Brigade Commanded by BG Bernard E. McDearman. The force was organized from 32 municipalities and consisted of over 2,000 officers and enlisted men. The force was active through WWII until disbanded on 30 June 1947. Many members of the State Guard were incorporated into the returning National Guard on or about April 1947.

The MSSG has supported Mississippi's hurricane response through relief and security assignments. Personnel were activated for Hurricane Katrina in 2005 and Hurricane Gustav in 2008. During those responses, members of its 3rd Security Brigade worked with the Federal Emergency Management Agency and assisted with shelter operations. Personnel also served during Hurricane Isaac in 2012, when an MSSG military police company led by Bill Rials provided security for the state's Joint Force Headquarters. Rials received the Emergency Service Medal for his leadership of that mission.

In 2009, the Jackson Free Press reported that Biloxi police had confiscated firearms from a small State Guard contingent at a special-needs shelter during Katrina following complaints about weapons and alcohol use.

== Membership ==
The MSSG accepts U.S. citizens aged 17–63, subject to eligibility requirements and background checks. Service has no fixed contractual term, but members must complete required training, participate satisfactorily and be available for deployment within Mississippi. The MSSG is a military reserve organization tasked with supplementing the forces of the MSARNG or MSANG when ordered by the Governor and/or Adjutant General of the State of Mississippi. While its primary mission is to assist in coping with man-made or natural disaster, the MSSG trains to be ready to meet any assignment.

Members generally purchase their uniforms and personal equipment. According to the MSSG, activated personnel are eligible for state active-duty pay and travel allowances, and mission-specific equipment is supplied during activation.

== Training ==
All new state guardsmen receive military training in the wear and appearance of their uniform, military structure and ranking system, military chain of command, rendering proper honors and respect to those appointed over them.

Members without prior military service complete Initial Entry Training; applicants with previous service are assessed individually. Members undergo an annual Physical Capabilities Assessment, with additional fitness requirements for some specialties.

Guardsmen are required to train in emergency management, by taking courses provided by the Federal Emergency Management Agency (FEMA). Completion of the FEMA training is necessary to earn the Military Emergency Management Specialist Badge. Members also receive specialized training areas like security force augmentation, logistics, supply, administration, or communications.

The MSSG lists Basic, Senior and Master levels of Military Emergency Management Specialist recognition. Its Basic MEMS requirements combine FEMA independent-study courses with a practicum. Subjects include incident command, national incident management, response planning, emergency operations centers and infrastructure protection.

Specialized functions also include field medical support by licensed personnel and chaplaincy requiring ecclesiastical credentials.

== Organization ==
The Commanding General of the MSSG is appointed by the Adjutant General and Governor of the State of Mississippi, and reports directly to them. All commissioned officer appointments and/or promotions must be approved by the Commanding General of the MSSG.

The MSSG's headquarters staff includes personnel, operations and training, logistics, civil affairs, communications, chaplaincy, public affairs, legal and inspector-general functions. As of October 2026, the organization's website lists Colonel Randall Saxton as chief of staff. It also identifies a 1st Division Support Brigade with command, executive-officer and senior enlisted leadership positions.

The MSSG's recruitment website lists the following units and locations:

- 115th FSC — Walnut Grove.
- 215th FSC — Camp McCain, Grenada, and the National Guard armory in Winona.
- 315th FSC and 317th SAF Detachment — Camp Shelby.

== Ribbons and decorations ==
Ribbons and decorations authorized for wear on the MSSG uniforms may be those that have been officially awarded by competent authority:

- Federally authorized ribbons and decorations awarded by the branches of the U.S. Armed Forces: Army, Navy, Air Force, Marines, Space Force, or Coast Guard, active or reserve components.
- State authorized ribbons and decorations awarded by the Air or Army National Guard of any state.
- Ribbons representing awards by the Mississippi State Guard.
- United States recognized foreign decorations or ribbons.
- State Guard Association of the United States (SGAUS) qualification badges.

Ribbons, decorations medals or badges awarded by the Civil Air Patrol, college or high school ROTC, or any other quasi-military organizations are not authorized for wear on the MSSG uniform.

Additional awards listed by the MSSG include the Legacy Ribbon, Joint Service Operations Ribbon, Service Ribbon and Volunteerism Ribbon; officer and noncommissioned officer professional-development awards; annual officer/warrant-officer and enlisted awards; and individual awards associated with the commanding general, command chief warrant officer and command sergeant major.

=== Authorized state guard ribbons and awards ===
==== Individual ====
- MSSG Distinguished Service Ribbon
- MSSG Meritorious Service Ribbon
- MSSG Commendation Ribbon
- MSSG Achievement Ribbon
- MSSG Award of Merit
- MSSG Longevity Service Ribbon
- MSSG Operation Desert Shield/Storm Service Ribbon
- MSSG Recruitment Ribbon
- MSSG Training Ribbon
- MSSG Association Membership Ribbon

==== Unit ====
- MSSG Outstanding Unit Citation

== Notable members ==
- CW5 (MSSG) Beckett Hadley
  - Chief Hadley became the first CW5 and was appointed as the first Command Chief Warrant Officer in the MSSG in 2022.
- CPT (MSSG) Braeden Hulme
  - Captain Hulme became the first Jewish chaplain commissioned in the MSSG in 2026.

== See also ==
- Mississippi Military Department
- Mississippi Army National Guard
- Mississippi Air National Guard
- Mississippi Wing Civil Air Patrol
