= KMEI =

KMEI may refer to:

- KMEI-LP, a low-power radio station (97.3 FM) licensed to Kamiah, Idaho, United States
- the ICAO code for Meridian Regional Airport, in Meridian, Mississippi, United States
