= 186th Air Refueling Wing =

Mississippi Air National Guard unit

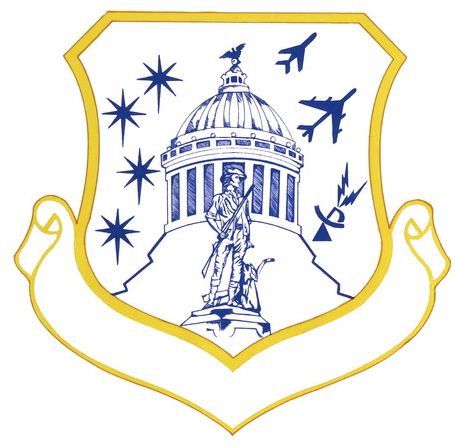
186th Air Refueling Wing

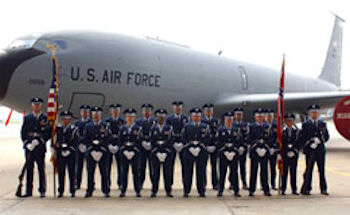
- 186th Air Refueling Wing KC-135
- Active: 1962–present
- Country: United States
- Allegiance: Mississippi
- Branch: Air National Guard
- Type: Wing
- Role: Aerial refueling
- Size: About 1200
- Part of: Mississippi Air National Guard
- Garrison/HQ: Key Field Air National Guard Base
- Decorations: Air Force Outstanding Unit Award

Commanders
- Wing Commander: Col. Robert K. Brady
- Deputy Wing Commander: Col. Joseph E. Reid
- Command Chief: Command Chief Master Sergeant Blake Stanley

Insignia
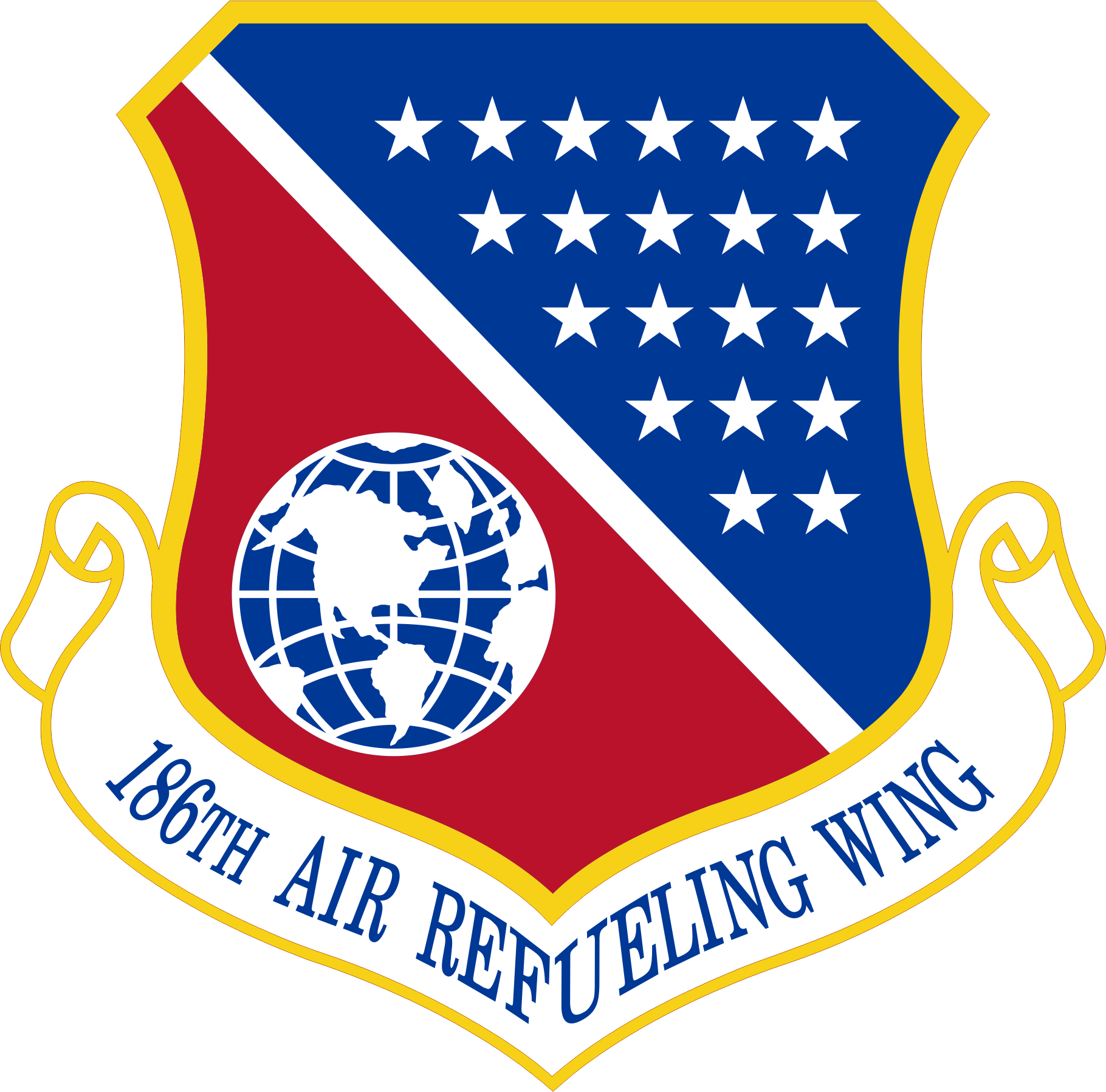
- 186th Air Refueling Wing emblem

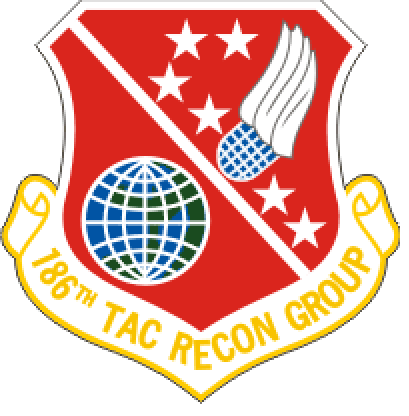
- 186th Tactical Reconnaissance Group emblem

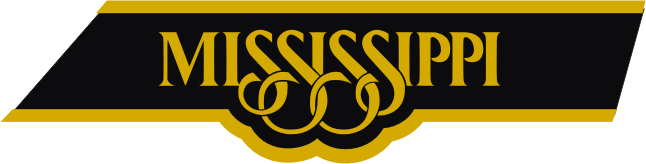
- Tail Stripe

The 186th Air Refueling Wing is a unit of the Mississippi Air National Guard stationed at Key Field Air National Guard Base, Mississippi. The 153d Air Refueling Squadron, assigned to the Wing's 186th Operations Group, was established on 18 August 1939 as the 153d Observation Squadron, one of the 29 National Guard observation squadrons formed before World War II.

The group was first organized in October 1962 as the 186th Tactical Reconnaissance Group. It served in the reconnaissance role until 1992, when it received Boeing KC-135 Stratotankers and converted to an air refueling mission.

== Overview ==
The 186th Air Refueling Wing provides worldwide air refueling support to combat commands of the United States Air Force, and to other United States military forces and the military forces of allied nations flying the KC-135 Stratotanker. With over 1,200 officers and airmen, the 186th is made up of mostly traditional guardsmen, but about one third of the members are full-time air technicians or active Guardsmen or reservists. The 186th also supports a Fairchild RC-26B Metroliner aircraft, modified to conduct intelligence, surveillance and reconnaissance mission.

The 2005 Base Realignment and Closure Commission recommended that the wing's KC-135R aircraft be transferred to the 128th Air Refueling Wing, 134th Air Refueling Wing and the 101st Air Refueling Wing. Its fire fighter positions would move to the 172d Airlift Wing at Allen C. Thompson Field Air National Guard Base, but its expeditionary combat support would remain in place.

In 2011, the wing began transferring its KC-135 aircraft in preparation for transition to an airlift wing as the Formal Training Unit for the C-27J Spartan aircraft. In 2013, this decision was reversed following a related decision to eliminate the C-27J from the Air Force and Air National Guard inventory. The wing retained its status as an air refueling wing and began re-equipping again with the KC-135.

== Units ==
- 186th Operations Group
- 186th Maintenance Group
- 186th Mission Support Group
- 186th Medical Group

== History ==
=== Tactical reconnaissance ===
On 15 October 1962, the Mississippi Air National Guard 153d Tactical Reconnaissance Squadron and its support elements expanded to form a group, and the 186th Tactical Reconnaissance Group was activated. The 153d becoming the group's flying squadron. Other units assigned to the group were the 186th Material Squadron, 186th Combat Support Squadron, and the 186th USAF Dispensary. Initially equipped with Republic RF-84F Thunderflash tactical reconnaissance aircraft, the group trained in normal peacetime operations.

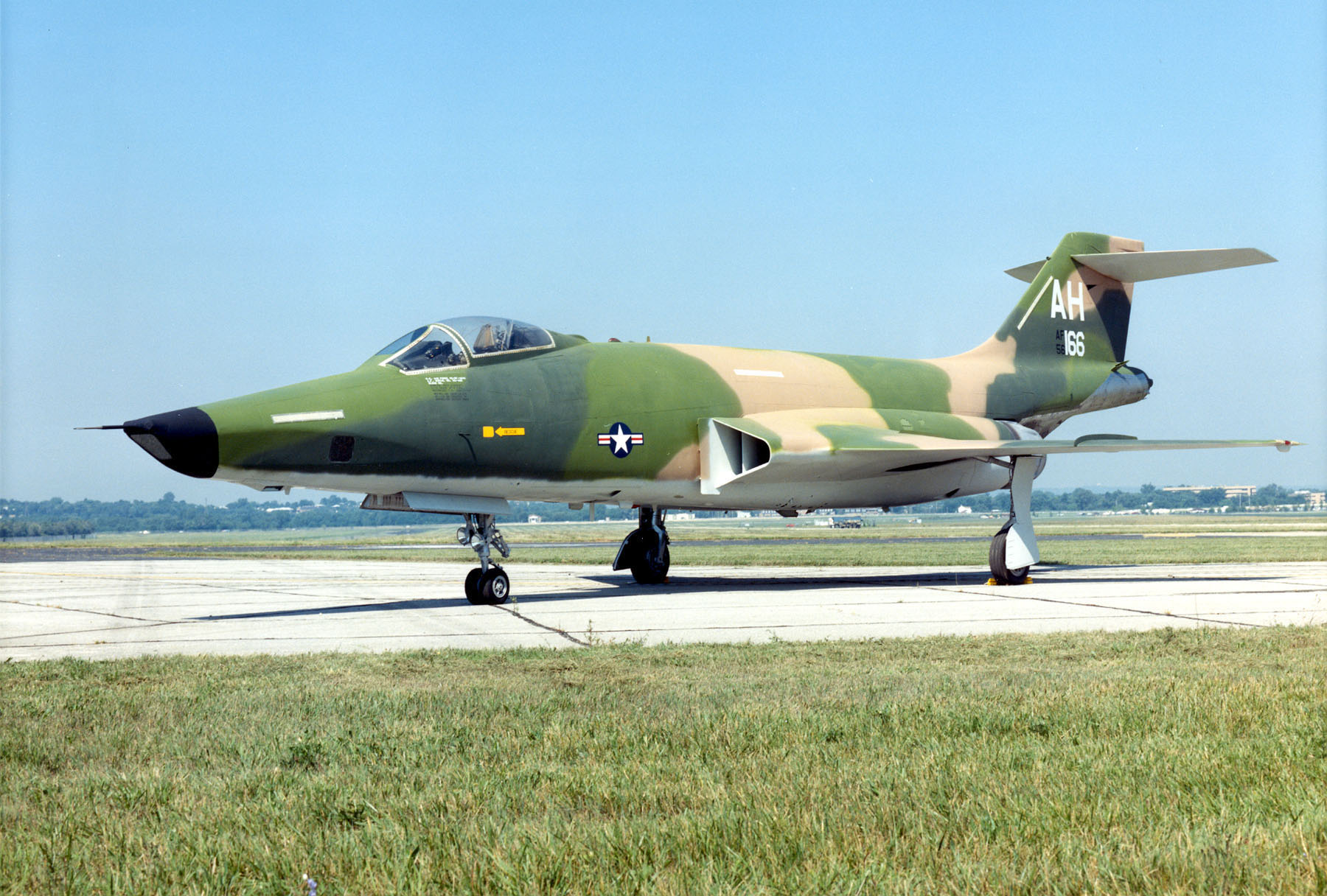
McDonnell RF-101C-40-MC Voodoo 56–166 at the National Museum of the United States Air Force.

In 1970 Tactical Air Command retired the group's Thunderstreaks and they were replaced by the McDonnell RF-101C Voodoo. In 1979 the Voodoos were again replaced by McDonnell RF-4C Phantom IIs. In 1990 during the Gulf Crisis, several aircraft and support personnel were activated and deployed to Doha International Airport, Qatar, where they became part of the 35th Tactical Fighter Wing (Provisional) during Operation Desert Shield and Desert Storm.

=== Air refueling ===
In 1992 the squadron's 186th Tactical Reconnaissance Group was realigned to an air refueling unit and its RF-4Cs were retired. The squadron was equipped with Boeing KC-135 Stratotankers. The group has seen worldwide duty with the KC-135, supporting Operation Display Determination, Operation Provide Relief, Operation Restore Hope, Operation Support Justice, Operation Deny Flight, Operation Northern Watch, Operation Noble Eagle, Operation Enduring Freedom and Operation Iraqi Freedom.

The wing's additional mission recalls its roots as a reconnaissance unit. Its RC-26 supports law enforcement agencies in their counterdrug efforts and also deploys overseas for imagery collection for combatant commanders. The C-26 program has worked directly with law enforcement agencies since 1996 providing National Guard support to battle illegal narcotics and illicit drugs. Overseas deployments have supported Department of Defense and United States Southern Command objectives in South America. The C-26 is manned full-time and the program is managed through the Mississippi National Guard Counterdrug Coordinator's office.

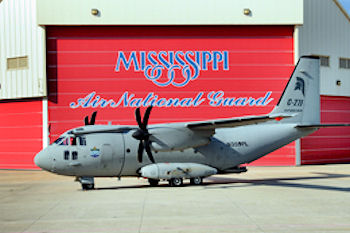
186th Air Refueling Wing C-27

In September 2008 the Air Force and Air National Guard officials agreed to establish a temporary mission qualification training detachment within the wing called "Project Liberty" for the Beechcraft MC-12 Liberty aircraft at Key Field to bolster the Department of Defense's intelligence gathering capability in Operation Iraqi Freedom and Operation Enduring Freedom. On 29 April 2009, the first MC-12W arrived at Key Field. This mission, designated Project Liberty, will train approximately 1,000 students over a two-year period. All crewmembers, two pilots, a sensor operator and a signals intelligence specialist trained at Key Field.

In 2011, the 186th began converting to the C-27J Spartan in preparation to become the formal training unit for all C-27 crew training. However, cuts in Department of Defense spending eliminated the C-27J from the active inventory and in 2013, the wing returned to flying the Boeing KC-135 Stratotanker.

During the COVID-19 pandemic, the Wing provided staff to assist with COVID-19 testing and, later, vaccinations.

== Lineage ==
- Constituted as the 186th Tactical Reconnaissance Group and allotted to the Air National Guard on 11 September 1962

Activated and extended federal recognition on 15 October 1962
Redesignated 186th Air Refueling Group on 13 April 1992
Redesignated 186th Air Refueling Wing on 16 October 1995

=== Assignments ===
- 117th Tactical Reconnaissance Wing, 15 October 1962

^ 108th Air Refueling Wing, 13 April 1993

- Mississippi Air National Guard, 16 Oct 1995 – present

Gaining Commands
Tactical Air Command, 15 October 1962
Air Combat Command, 30 June 1992
Air Mobility Command, 1 October 1993 - Present

=== Components ===
- 186th Operations Group, c. 1 March 1994 – present
- 153d Tactical Reconnaissance Squadron (later 153d Air Refueling Squadron), 15 October 1962 – c. 1 March 1994
- 186th Air Operations Group
- 238th Air Support Operations Squadron
- 248th Air Traffic Control Squadron

=== Stations ===
- Key Field (later Key Field Air National Guard Base), 15 October 1962 – present

=== Aircraft ===
- Republic RF-84F Thunderflash: 1962–1970
- McDonnell RF-101C Voodoo: 1970–1979
- McDonnell RF-4C Phantom II: 1978–1991
- Boeing KC-135R Stratotanker: 1992– 2011, 2013–present
- Fairchild RC-26B Metroliner: 2007–present
- Beechcraft MC-12 Liberty: 2009–2011
- Alenia C-27J Spartan: 2011–2012
