= 153d Air Refueling Squadron =

Mississippi Air National Guard unit

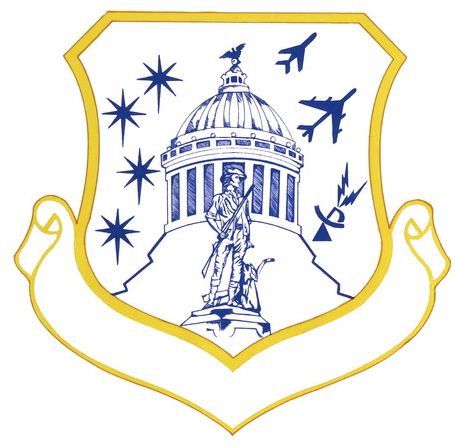
153d Air Refueling Squadron

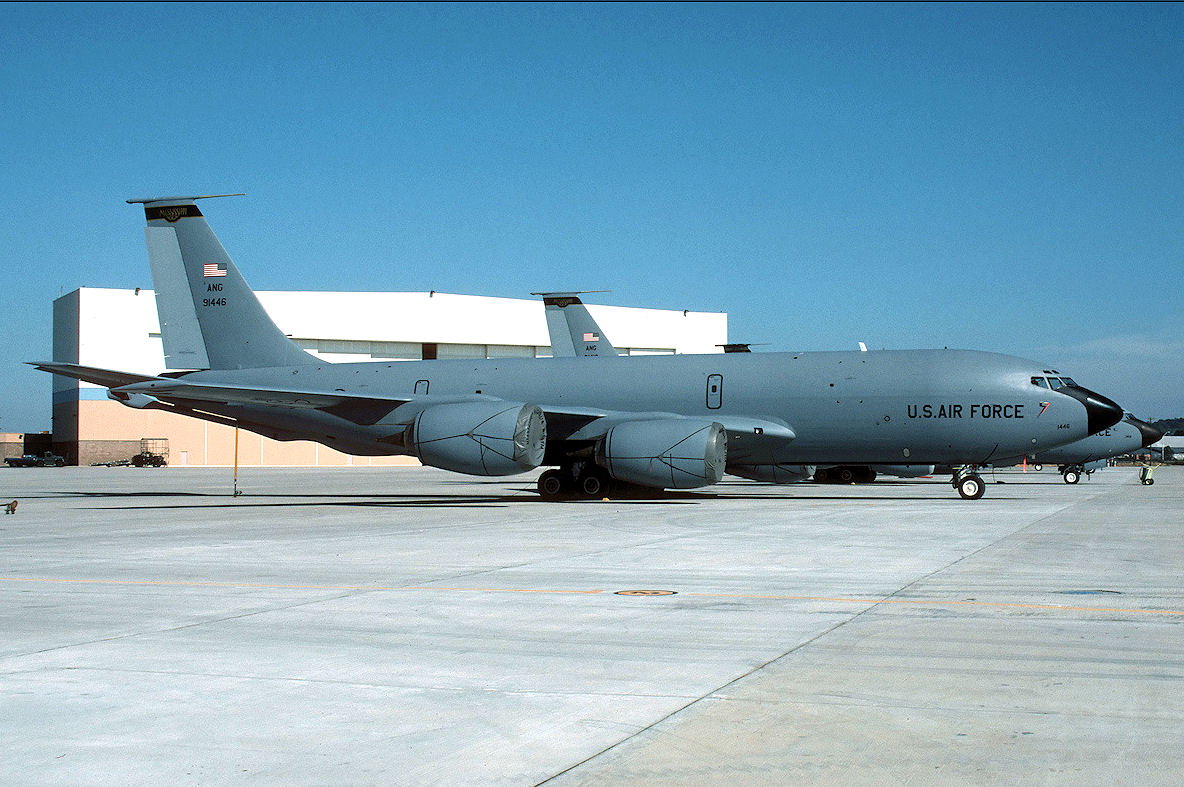
- 153d Air Refueling Squadron KC-135E at Key Field Air National Guard Base (Note: Aircraft is Boeing KC-135E Stratotanker, serial 59-1446.)
- Active: 1939–1945; 1946–1952; 1952–present
- Country: United States
- Allegiance: Mississippi
- Branch: Air National Guard
- Type: Squadron
- Role: Aerial refueling
- Part of: Mississippi Air National Guard
- Garrison/HQ: Key Field Air National Guard Base, Mississippi
- Engagements: European Theater of Operations
- Decorations: Belgian Fourragère

Insignia
- 153d Air Refueling Squadron emblem

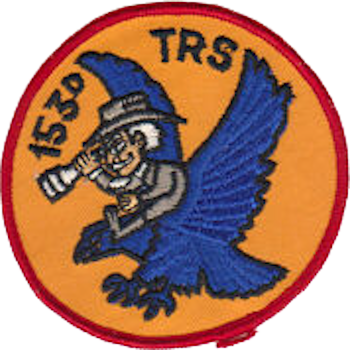
- 153d Tactical Reconnaissance Squadron emblem (Note: Approved 15 December 1953.)

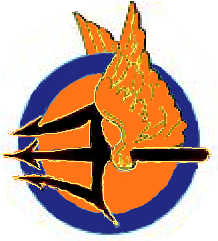
- 153d Observation Squadron emblem

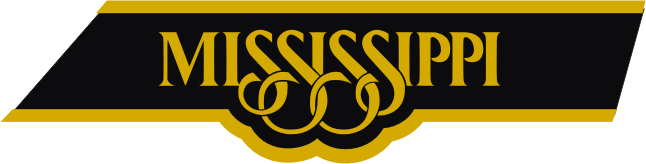
- Tail stripe

The 153d Air Refueling Squadron is a unit of the Mississippi Air National Guard 186th Air Refueling Wing located at Key Field Air National Guard Base, Mississippi. The 153d is equipped with the KC-135 Stratotanker aircraft.

The squadron is a descendant organization of the 153d Observation Squadron, one of the 29 original National Guard Observation Squadrons of the United States Army National Guard formed before World War II.

== Mission ==
The squadrons aircraft are eight KC-135R Stratotankers. The mission of the squadron is to provide air refueling support to major commands of the United States Air Force, as well as other U.S. military forces and the military forces of allied nations.

== History ==
=== World War II ===
Activated as part of the Mississippi National Guard in 1939. Equipped with Douglas O-38 observation aircraft. Ordered to active service on 15 October 1940 as part of the buildup of the Army Air Corps prior to the United States entry into World War II. After the Japanese attack on Pearl Harbor, was attached to Army Air Forces Antisubmarine Command, performed anti-submarine patrols over the Gulf of Mexico until August 1943 when the mission was turned over to the United States Navy.

Transferred to the European Theater of Operations, August 1943. Assigned to Ninth Air Force as a photographic reconnaissance unit. After the Normandy Invasion in June 1944, because a liaison and courier unit flying light aircraft until the end of the war in Europe. Inactivated during December 1945 in Germany.

=== Mississippi Air National Guard ===
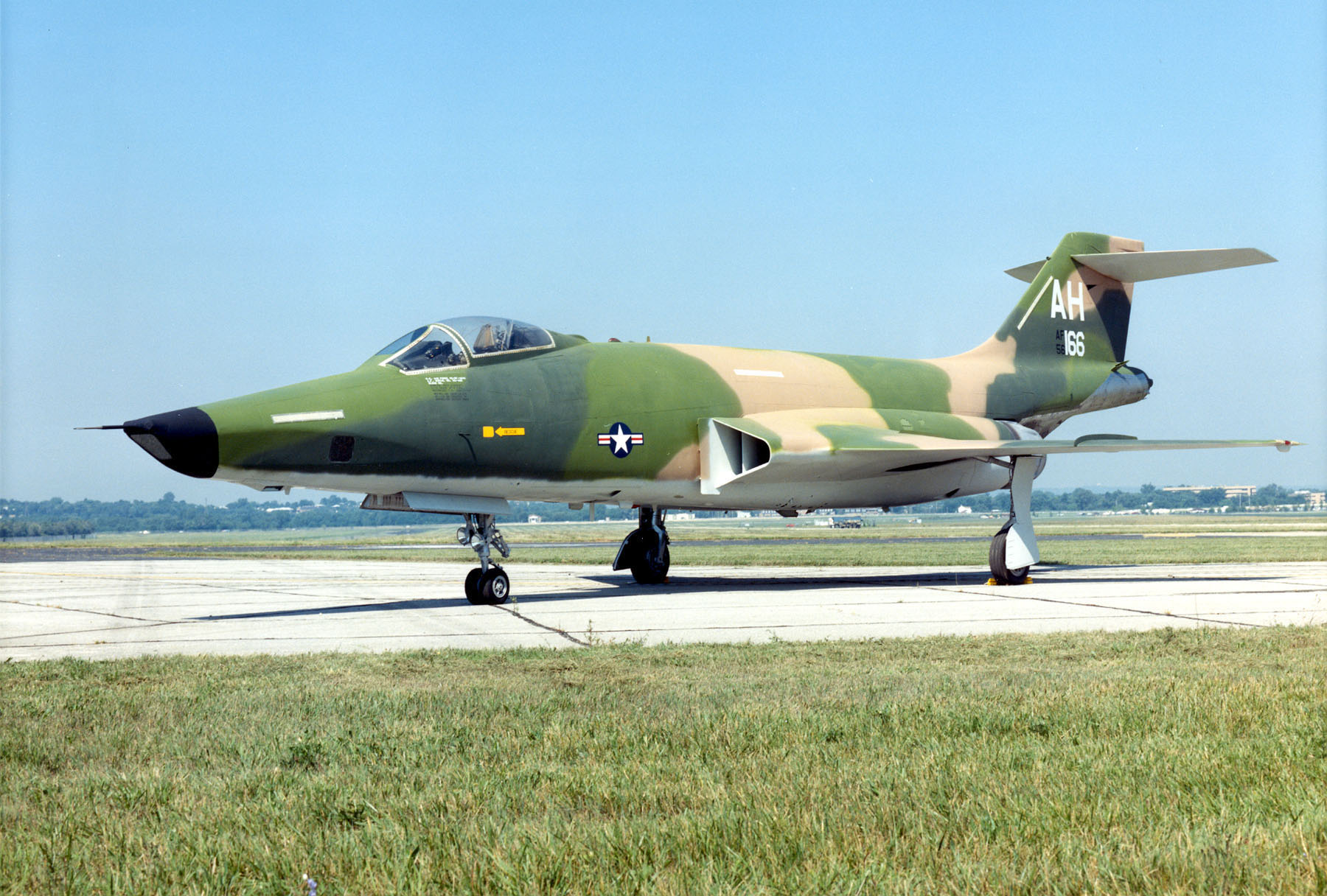
Former squadron RF-101C Voodoo at the National Museum of the United States Air Force

The squadron was redesignated as the 153d Fighter Squadron and allotted to the National Guard on 24 May 1946. It was organized at Key Field, Mississippi and was extended federal recognition on 12 September. The squadron was equipped with F-47D Thunderbolts and was allocated to the Fourteenth Air Force, Continental Air Command by the National Guard Bureau.

The unit was called to active federal service on 1 March 1951. This activation temporarily resulted in the dissolution of the Mississippi Air National Guard, as members were sent to various places, including for many, duty in the Korean War. The squadron was sent to Turner Air Force Base, Georgia where it was assigned to the federalized 108th Fighter-Bomber Group with a mission to provide fighter escorts to Strategic Air Command B-50 Superfortress bombers on training missions. In December 1951 it moved to Godman Air Force Base, Kentucky where it replaced a unit deployed to England. It was released from active duty and returned to Mississippi state control on 10 November 1952.

Reformed in December 1952, being equipped with RF-51D Mustang reconnaissance aircraft. Performed tactical reconnaissance for Tactical Air Command, retiring the Mustangs in 1955 and flying RF-80C Shooting Star aircraft until 1956. Re-equipped with RF-84F Thunderflash reconnaissance aircraft.

At the height of the Cold War in 1961, the squadron was federalized as a result of tensions concerning the Berlin Wall. Part of the squadron remained at Key Field in an active-duty status for about a year before being released.

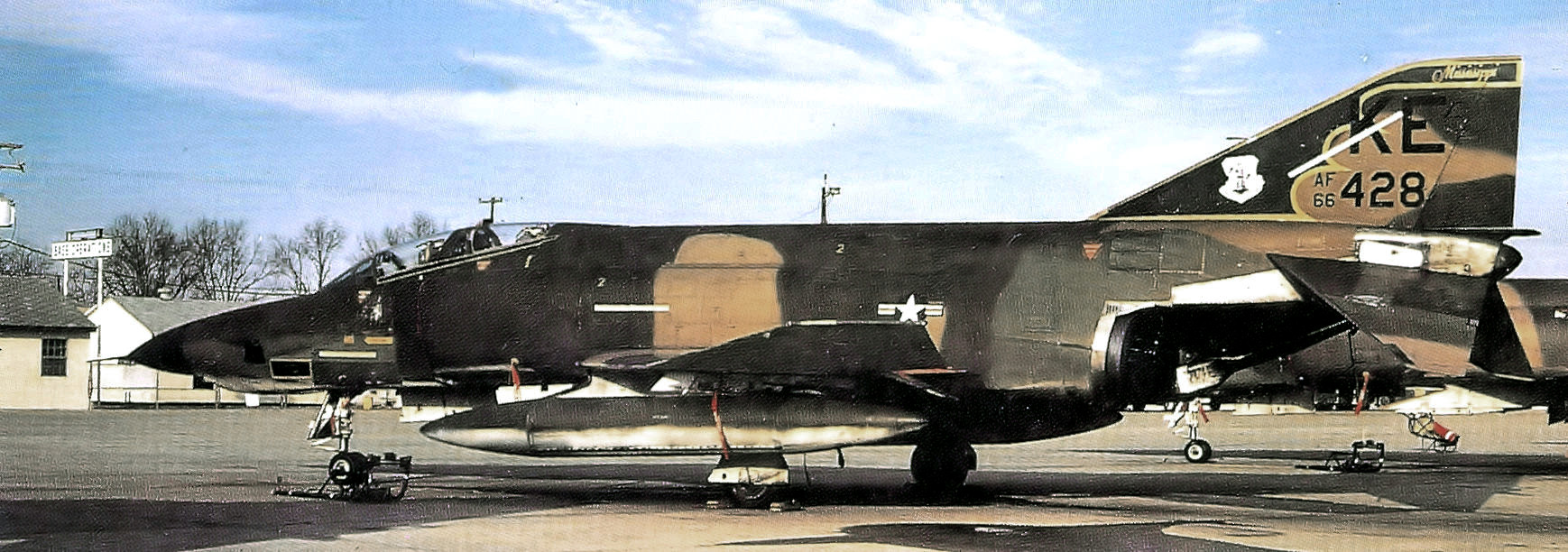
153d Tactical Reconnaissance Squadron RF-4C 66-0428 Tail Code: "KE"

On 15 October 1962, the 153d was authorized to expand to a group level, and the 186th Tactical Reconnaissance Group was established. The 153d becameg the group's flying squadron. Other elements assigned into the group were the 186th group headquarters, 186th Material Squadron (maintenance and supply), 186th Combat Support Squadron, and the 186th USAF Dispensary. In 1970 Tactical Air Command retired the RF-84s and they were replaced by the RF-101C Voodoo. (Note: McDonnell RF-101C Voodoo, serial 56-0166, on display at the National Museum of the United States Air Force, served with the 153d. The aircraft was flown directly from Key Field to the Wright-Patterson Air Force Base, Ohio on its final flight 27 October 1978.) In 1979 the Voodoos were again replaced by RF-4C Phantom IIs.

In 1990 during the Gulf Crisis, several aircraft and support personnel were activated and deployed to Doha International Airport, Qatar, being part of the 35th Tactical Fighter Wing (Provisional) during Operation Desert Shield, Operation Desert Storm.

In 1992 the squadron's 186th Tactical Reconnaissance Group was realigned to an air refueling unit as the RF-4Cs were retired. The squadron was equipped with KC-135 Stratotankers and placed initially under Air Combat Command, later under Air Mobility Command. The 153d Air Refueling Squadron has seen worldwide duty with the KC-135s, supporting Operation Display Determination, Operation Provide Relief, Operation Restore Hope, Operation Support Justice, Operation Deny Flight, Operation Northern Watch, Operation Noble Eagle, Operation Enduring Freedom and Operation Iraqi Freedom.

=== Lineage ===
- Designated as the 153d Observation Squadron and allotted to the Mississippi NG, on 18 August 1939

Activated on 27 September 1939
Ordered to active service on 15 October 1940
Redesignated 153d Observation Squadron (Light) on 13 January 1942
Redesignated 153d Observation Squadron on 4 July 1942
Redesignated 153d Liaison Squadron on 31 May 1943
Inactivated on 15 December 1945

- Redesignated 153d Fighter Squadron, and allotted to the National Guard on 24 May 1946.

Extended federal recognition on 12 September 1946
Federalized and placed on active duty on 1 March 1951
Redesignated 153d Fighter-Bomber Squadron on 16 May 1951
Inactivated, released from active duty and returned to Mississippi state control on 1 December 1952
Redesignated 153d Tactical Reconnaissance Squadron on 1 December 1952
Federalized and placed on active duty on 1 October 1961
Released from active duty and returned to Mississippi state control on 31 August 1962
Redesignated 153d Air Refueling Squadron on 1 April 1992

=== Assignments ===
- Mississippi National Guard, 27 September 1939
- Fourth Corps Area, 15 October 1940
- V Army Corps, c. Dec 1940
- 67th Observation Group (later 67th Reconnaissance Group, 67th Tactical Reconnaissance Group), 1 September 1941
- IX Fighter Command, 12 December 1943 (attached to First Army 4 February – 15 November 1944)
- Ninth Air Force, 14 March 1944
- IX Tactical Air Command, 25 April 1944 (attached to Twelfth Army Group after 15 November 1944)
- XII Tactical Air Command, 15 July – 15 December 1945 (attached to Twelfth Army Group until 26 July 1945, Seventh Army after 26 July 1945)
- 116th Fighter Group, 12 September 1946
- 108th Fighter-Interceptor Group, 1 March 1951 – 30 November 1952
- 116th Fighter-Interceptor Group (later 116th Fighter-Bomber Group), 30 November 1952
- 7117th Tactical Wing, 1 October 1961
- 116th Fighter-Bomber Group, 31 August 1962
- 186th Tactical Reconnaissance Group (later 186th Air Refueling Group), 15 October 1962
- 186th Operations Group, 1 June 1992 – present

=== Stations ===
- Meridian, Mississippi, 27 September 1939
- Bluethenthal Field, North Carolina, 16 December 1941
- Key Field, Mississippi, 28 January 1942
- Esler Field, Louisiana, 17 Feb – 12 August 1942
- RAF Membury, England, 7 September 1942
- RAF Keevil, England, 28 November 1942
- RAF Membury, England, 3 October 1943
- RAF Keevil, England, 28 November 1943
- RAF Erlestokes, England, 13 March 1944
- Vouilly, France, 18 June 1944
- Canisy, France, 6 August 1944
- St Pois, France, 11 August 1944
- Couteme, France, 23 August 1944
- Maillebois, France, 25 August 1944
- St Cyr, France, 2 September 1944
- Vuel, Belgium, 10 September 1944
- Ham, Belgium, 12 September 1944
- Stree (near Huy), Belgium, 16 September 1944
- Verviers, Belgium, 20 September 1944
- Spa, Belgium, 24 October 1944
- Olne, Belgium, c. 19 December 1944 (operated from Liege, Belgium, 18–23 Dec 1944)
- Tongres, Belgium, 22 December 1944
- Rutten (Russon), Belgium, 8 January 1945

Operated from Tongres, Belgium, 18 January 1945

- Duren, Germany, 9 Man 1945
- Euskirchen, Germany, 16 March 1945
- Bad Godesberg, Germany, 30 March 1945
- Marburg, Germany, 5 April 1945
- Bad Wildungen, Germany, 15 April 1945
- Weimar, Germany, 24 April 1945
- Brunswick, Germany, 20 May 1945
- Augsburg, Germany, 4 June 1945
- Heidelberg, Germany, 25 Jul – 15 December 1945
- Key Field, Mississippi, 12 September 1946
- Turner Air Force Base, Georgia, March 1951
- Godman Air Force Base, Kentucky, 11 December 1951
- Key Field (later Meridian Regional Airport, Key Field Air National Guard Base), Mississippi, 1 December 1952 – present

=== Aircraft ===
- Douglas O-38, 1939–1941
- In addition to North American O-47, 1940–1942, and O-49 and Curtiss O-52 Owl, 1941–1942
- Included F-3A Havoc and F-6A Mustang in 1942; in addition to L-4 Sentinel, 1942–1944, and F-3A Havoc, 1943–1944
- Included Spitfire PR XI, 1942–1943, and DB-7 Boston, 1943
- L-5 Sentinel, 1944–1945
- F-47 Thunderbolt, 1946–1952
- RF-51D Mustang, 1952–1955
- RF-80 Shooting Star, 1955–1956
- RF-84F Thunderflash, 1956–1970
- RF-101C Voodoo, 1970–1979
- RF-4C Phantom II, 1978–1991
- KC-135 Stratotanker, 1992–2011
- C-26 Metroliner, 2007–present
- C-27J Spartan, 2011–2013
- KC-135R Stratotanker, 2013–present

== See also ==
- List of observation squadrons of the United States Army National Guard
