= Yohannes Gebremeskel =

Ethiopian lieutenant general

Lieutenant General Yohannes Gebremeskel Gezahegn

Head of Mission, Commander, United Nations Interim Security Force for Abyei
- In office 12 March 2013 – 19 June 2014
- Nominated by: Ban Ki-moon
- Preceded by: Tadesse Werede Tesfay
- Succeeded by: Halefom Ejigu Moges (acting)

Force Commander, Commander, United Nations Interim Security Force for Abyei
- In office 12 March 2013 – 19 June 2014
- Nominated by: Ban Ki-moon
- Preceded by: Tadesse Werede Tesfay
- Succeeded by: Birhanu Jula Gelalcha

Personal details
- Born: Ethiopia

Lieutenant General Yohannes Gebremeskel Tesfamariam is an Ethiopian lieutenant general who was the Head of Mission and Force Commander of the United Nations Interim Security Force for Abyei (UNISFA) from 2013-2014. He was appointed to this position by the United Nations Secretary-General Ban Ki-moon on 12 March 2013.

His assignment ended on 19 June 2014. Major-General Halefom Ejigu Moges assumed the post of acting Head of Mission, later succeeded by the appointment of Commander Haile Tilahun Gebremariam. Major General Birhanu Jula Gelalcha was appointed Force Commander.

== Biography ==
Born in 1960 in Tigray, Ethiopia, Major General Tesfamariam has a master's degree in peace and security from Addis Ababa University, Ethiopia.

== Career ==
Lieutenant General Tesfamariam has 35 years of experience in the Ethiopian military. His commanding roles include positions as Commander of the Army Corps and the Government of Ethiopia Commissioner for the United Nations Mission in Ethiopia and Eritrea (UNMEE) and Head of the Peacekeeping Department and Head of the Military Intelligence Department in the Ethiopian Ministry of National Defence.

Prior to his appointment as head of mission for UNISFA, he was Deputy Force Commander of UNISFA.
