= Gebre Adhana Woldezgu =

Ethiopian general

Major General Gebre Adhana Woldezgu

Force Commander, United Nations Interim Security Force for Abyei
- In office 4 April 2018 – 23 April 2019
- Nominated by: António Guterres
- Preceded by: Tesfay Gidey Hailemichael
- Succeeded by: Mehari Zewde Gebremariam

Personal details
- Born: Ethiopia

Major General Gebre Adhana Woldezgu is a general with the Ethiopian National Defense Force (ENDF). He has served as the Force Commander of the United Nations Interim Security Force for Abyei (UNISFA) since 4 April 2018.

Major General Woldezgu was appointed as Force Commander of UNISFA by United Nations Secretary-General António Guterres. On 19 Feb 2019, it was announced that Woldezgu's term would end on 23 April 2019. He will be succeeded by Major General Mehari Zewde Gebremariam.
