= Hassen Ebrahim Mussa =

Ethiopian general

General Hassen Ebrahim Mussa

Force Commander, United Nations Interim Security Force for Abyei
- In office 15 January 2016 – 23 February 2017
- Nominated by: Ban Ki-moon
- Preceded by: Birhanu Jula Gelalcha
- Succeeded by: Tesfay Gidey Hailemichael

Personal details
- Born: Dire Dewa Ethiopia

General Hassen Ebrahim Mussa is an Ethiopian general who served as the Force Commander of the United Nations Interim Security Force for Abyei (UNISFA) from 2016–2017.

== Biographical information ==
General Mussa is a graduate of the Open University in the United Kingdom and holds a master's degree in Business Administration. From 2005 to 2010, he served the ENDF as the Head of Foreign Relations and Military Cooperation and Peacekeeping. In addition to serving as Head of the Peacekeeping Coordination Centre for the ENDF, he served in the African Union and United Nations Mission in Darfur from 2010 to 2011.

He was appointed as Force Commander of UNISFA on 15 January 2016 by United Nations Secretary-General Ban Ki-moon. He was succeeded on 17 January 2017 by Major General Tesfay Gidey Hailemichael.
