= Tesfay Gidey Hailemichael =

Ethiopian general

Major General Tesfay Gidey Hailemichael

Force Commander, United Nations Interim Security Force for Abyei
- In office 23 February 2017 – 4 April 2018
- Nominated by: António Guterres
- Preceded by: Hassen Ebrahim Mussa
- Succeeded by: Gebre Adhana Woldezgu

Personal details
- Born: Ethiopia

Major General Tesfay Gidey Hailemichael is a general with the Ethiopian National Defense Force (ENDF). He served as the Force Commander of the United Nations Interim Security Force for Abyei (UNISFA) from 2017–2018.

Major General Tesfay was appointed as Force Commander of UNISFA on 23 February 2017 by United Nations Secretary-General António Guterres. During his tenure, he launched an environmental cleaning campaign in the town of Abeyi, intended to enhance the community and remove breeding sites for pests. He was succeeded on 4 April 2018 by Major General Gebre Adhana Woldezgu.
