= Ganesh Shrestha =

Nepali military officer

Lieutenant General Ganesh Kumar Shrestha is a Nepalese army officer currently serving as force commander of the United Nations Interim Security Force for Abyei (UNISFA).

== Education ==
Shrestha studied for a bachelor's degree in Humanities and Social Sciences at Tribhuvan University, Kathmandu, Nepal and earned master's degree in economics from same university. He obtained a master's degree in Military Science and Strategic Studies from the International College of Defence Studies, National Defence University, China.

== Military career ==
He served as commander of the 16th and 9th Brigades and as Director of Policy and Plans at the Army Headquarters, Nepal. He was the Administrative Registrar of Shree Birendra Military Hospital and later appointed as Adjutant General at the Nepali Army Headquarters and as Master General of Ordnance of the Nepal Army. He was promoted to the rank of lieutenant general in 2025.

At the United Nations, Shrestha served as Sector Commander for Sector East of the United Nations Mission in South Sudan (UNMISS) and was appointed as Commander of UN Interim Security Force for Abyei (UNISFA) by the United Nations Secretary-General António Guterres in 2025.
