= Halefom Ejigu Moges =

Major General Halefom Ejigu Moges

Acting Head of Mission, Commander, United Nations Interim Security Force for Abyei
- In office 19 June 2014 – 28 January 2015
- Nominated by: Ban Ki-moon
- Preceded by: Yohannes Gebremeskel Tesfamariam
- Succeeded by: Haile Tilahun Gebremariam

Personal details
- Born: Ethiopia

Major General Halefom Ejigu Moges is an Ethiopian major general who was acting Head of Mission of the United Nations Interim Security Force for Abyei (UNISFA) from 2014-2015. His assignment ended with the appointment of Haile Tilahun Gebremariam as Head of Mission on 28 January 2015.
