= Haile Tilahun Gebremariam =

Commander, United Nations Interim Security Force for Abyei
- In office January 28, 2015 – August 12, 2016
- Nominated by: Ban Ki-moon
- Preceded by: Major-General Halefom Ejigu Moges (acting)

Personal details
- Born: January 13, 1954 Ethiopian Empire
- Died: August 12, 2016 (aged 62)

Haile Tilahun Gebremariam (January 13, 1954 – August 12, 2016) was an Ethiopian military officer. On January 28, 2015 he was appointed the Head of Mission for United Nations Interim Security Force for Abyei (UNISFA) by United Nations Secretary-General Ban Ki-moon.

== Biographical information ==
As of 1989 Haile was a political commissar for the Ethiopian People's Revolutionary Democratic Front. He belonged to the Ethiopian People's Democratic Movement, which later became the Amhara National Democratic Movement.

In 1997–1998, Haile, then a Brigadier-General, served as Head of Education and Administration at the Ministry of Defence.

He served as Ethiopian Air Force Deputy Commander 1998–2001 and as State Minister of Defence 2003–2006., Following his career with the Ministry of Defence, Haile worked in the private sector as an adviser for an engineering company and an internal audit management company.

He studied at the Open University in the United Kingdom and held a master's degree.

He died on August 12, 2016.
