= United Nations Interim Security Force for Abyei =

United Nations peacekeeping mission

- Under control of the UNISFA
- Abbreviation: UNISFA
- Formation: 27 June 2011
- Type: Peacekeeping Mission
- Legal status: Active
- Headquarters: Abyei Town
- Force Commander: Lieutenant General Ganesh Kumar Shrestha
- Parent organization: United Nations Security Council
- Website: https://unisfa.unmissions.org/

The United Nations Interim Security Force for Abyei (UNISFA) is a United Nations peacekeeping force in Abyei, which is contested between the Republic of Sudan and the Republic of South Sudan. UNISFA was approved on 27 June 2011 by the United Nations Security Council in United Nations Security Council Resolution 1990 after a flareup in the South Kordofan conflict earlier in June 2011. The Ethiopian Army was the largest contributor of personnel, and until 2022, the only contributor of individual troops.

== History ==
The peacekeepers began arriving in Abyei on 15 July 2011 after traveling overland from Ethiopia, just under a week after South Sudan formally declared its independence.

The UNISFA mandate has been renewed annually since 2011. Given that sporadic and spontaneous violence remained very high, UNISFA's ability to control violence in Abyei has been questioned. In its November 2024 resolution the UN Security Council ordered a strategic review of UNISFA's effectiveness no later than 15 August 2025. In 2024 one of the UN peacekeepers was killed when their base in Agok was attacked.

On 13 December 2025, six Bangladeshi peacekeepers were killed in a drone strike at a logistics base in Kadugli. Another eight peacekeepers were injured.

== Command ==
In the operation's initial years, the position of Head of Mission and Force Commander were jointly held by the same person. Beginning in 2014, both positions were held by a different person. However since Haile Tilahun Gebremariam died, the acting Head of Mission has been the Force Commander.

Head of Mission, UNIFSA
No.	Name	Nationality	Tenure
1	Maj. Gen. Tadesse Werede Tesfay	Ethiopia	2011–2013
2	Maj. Gen. Yohannes Gebremeskel Tesfamariam	Ethiopia	2013–2014
-	Maj. Gen. Halefom Ejigu Moges (acting)	Ethiopia	2014–2015
3	Haile Tilahun Gebremariam	Ethiopia	2015–2016 deceased
-	Brig. Gen. Zewdu Kiros Gebrekidan Officer-in-charge Head of Mission	Ethiopia	12 August 2016 – 21 March 2017
-	Maj. Gen. Tesfay Gidey Hailemichael (acting)	Ethiopia	21 March 2017 – 23 April 2018
-	Maj. Gen. Gebre Adhana Woldezgu (acting)	Ethiopia	15 May 2018 – 23 Apr 2019
-	Maj. Gen. Mehari Gebremariam (acting)	Ethiopia	23 April 2019 – 7 July 2020
-	Maj. Gen. Kefyalew Amde Tessema (acting)	Ethiopia	2020–2022
-	Maj. Gen. Benjamin Olufemi Sawyerr (acting)	Nigeria	2022– 31 May 2024
-	Brig. Gen. Ameer Muhammad Umrani temporarily acting	Pakistan	31 May 2024 – 11 July 2024
-	Maj. Gen. Robert Yaw Affram (acting)	Ghana	11 July 2024 –

Force Commander, UNIFSA
No.	Name	Nationality	Tenure
1	Maj. Gen. Tadesse Werede Tesfay	Ethiopia	2011–2013
2	Lt. Gen. Yohannes Gebremeskel Tesfamariam	Ethiopia	2013–2014
3	Maj. Gen. Birhanu Jula Gelalcha	Ethiopia	2014–2016
4	Maj. Gen. Hassen Ebrahim Mussa	Ethiopia	2016–2017
5	Maj. Gen. Tesfay Gidey Hailemichael	Ethiopia	2017–2018
6	Maj. Gen. Gebre Adhana Woldezgu	Ethiopia	2018–2019
7	Maj. Gen. Mehari Zewde Gebremariam	Ethiopia	2019–2020
8	Maj. Gen. Kefyalew Amde Tessema	Ethiopia	2020–2022
9	Maj. Gen. Benjamin Olufemi Sawyerr	Nigeria	15 March 2022 – 31 May 2024
-	Brig. Gen. Ameer Muhammad Umrani temporarily acting	Pakistan	31 May 2024 – 11 July 2024
-	Maj. Gen. Robert Yaw Affram acting	Ghana	11 July 2024 – 2 December 2025
10	Lt. Gen. Ganesh Kumar Shrestha	Nepal	2 December 2025 –

== Contributing countries ==
As of 31 May 2018, the total number of personnel in the mission is 4,571, all but a little over 100 of whom are Ethiopian.

Country	Experts	Police	Staff Officer	Troops
Bahrain	2			
Benin	2			
Bhutan	1		1	
Bolivia	2			
Brazil	2			
Burkina Faso	1			
Burundi	3			
Cambodia			1	
Dominican Republic			1	2
Ecuador	1		1	
El Salvador	1			
Ethiopia	78	5	79	4,288
Ghana	3	4	6	
Guatemala	3		1	
Guinea	1		1	
India	1		3	
Indonesia	2		2	
Jordan		4		
Malawi			1	
Mongolia	1		1	
Namibia	3	4	2	
Nepal	3		1	
Nigeria	2		2	
Peru	2			
Russia	1			
Rwanda	2	3	4	
Seychelles		2		
Sierra Leone	1		2	
Sri Lanka	5		1	
Tanzania	2	9	1	
Ukraine	4		2	
Vietnam		2		
Zambia	1		1	
Zimbabwe	2	10	1	
