= Meridian Regional Airport =

Airport in Mississippi, United States

Meridian Regional Airport Key Field
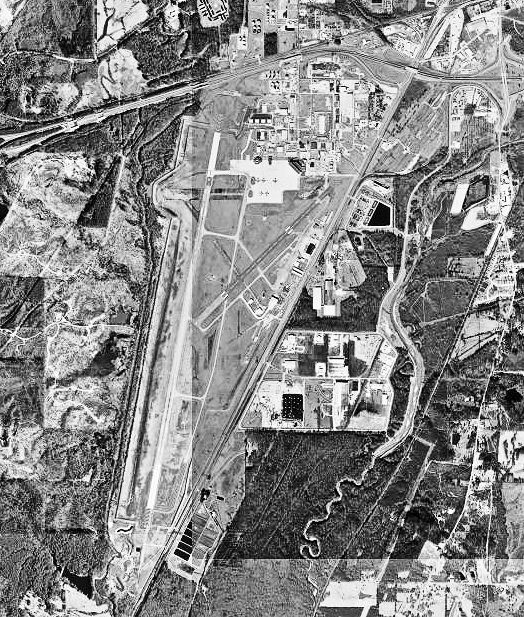
- USGS 1996 orthophoto
- IATA: MEI; ICAO: KMEI; FAA LID: MEI

Summary
- Airport type: Public
- Owner: Meridian Airport Authority
- Serves: Meridian, Mississippi
- Elevation AMSL: 297 ft (91 m)
- Coordinates: 32°19′57″N 088°45′07″W
- Website: MeridianAirport.com

Map
- Location of airport in Mississippi MEI (the United States)

Runways
Direction	Length		Surface
Direction	ft	m	Surface
1/19	10,003	3,049	Asphalt/Concrete
4/22	4,599	1,402	Asphalt

Statistics (2012)
- Aircraft operations: 85,250
- Based aircraft: 75
- Sources: Airport and FAA

Meridian Regional Airport (IATA: MEI, ICAO: KMEI, FAA LID: MEI) is a joint civil-military public use airport located at Key Field, a joint-use public/military airfield. It is located 3 nautical miles (5.6 km; 3.5 mi) southwest of Meridian, a city in Lauderdale County, Mississippi, United States. The Meridian Airport Authority owns the airport. At 10,003 feet (3,049 m), Key Field is home to the longest public use runway in Mississippi. It is mostly used for general aviation and military traffic, but it is also served by one commercial airline with scheduled passenger service subsidized by the Essential Air Service program.

According to the Federal Aviation Administration, Meridian Regional Airport had 19,599 passengers board (enplanements) in 2008, 18,560 in 2009, and 16,871 in 2010. The National Plan of Integrated Airport Systems for 2011–2015 categorized it as a primary commercial service facility.

== History ==
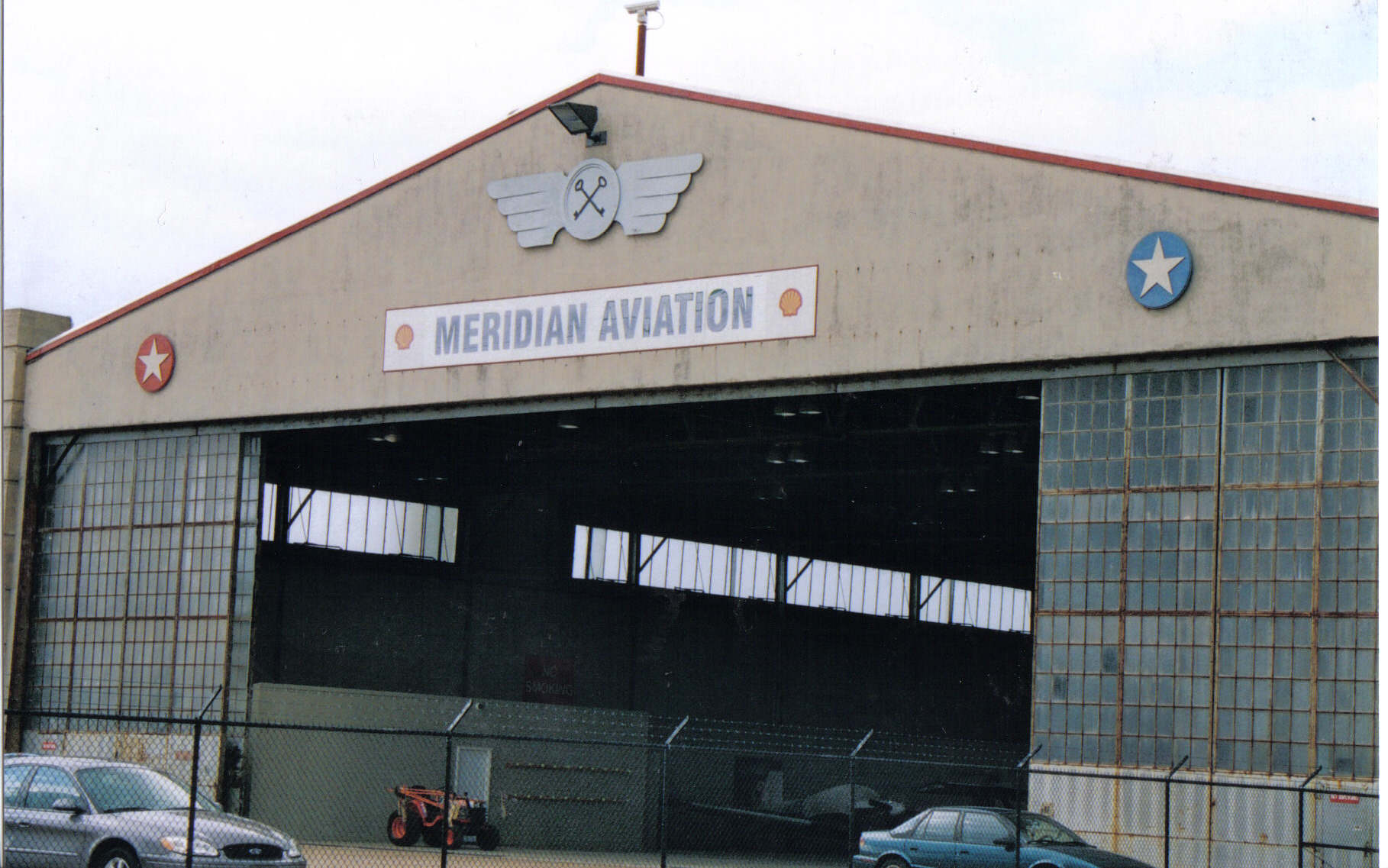
Main Hangar at Key Field

Meridian Regional Airport was established in 1928 and opened in November 1930 with the completion of the terminal, hangar, powerhouse, and a graded and packed dirt runway. Meridian city officials asked Al and Fred Key, who operated the Key Brothers' Flying School at Bonita, to co-manage the new facility. The brothers maintained their flying school at the new field as well as their other duties, such as selling commercial airline tickets, operating the terminal and hangar, and handling airmail delivery schedules.

With the onset of the Great Depression, the City of Meridian considered abandoning the airport because of the cost of maintenance. The Key Brothers, wanting to keep the airport in business, planned to break the standing flight endurance record of 23 days and therefore focusing worldwide attention on Meridian and its airport.

From June 4 until July 1, 1935, the brothers flew over Meridian for a total flight time of over 27 days. Key Field is named in their honor. The hangar and offices used by the Key brothers preceding and following the flight are still in use today and are listed in the National Register of Historic Places.

During World War II, the facility operated under the name Key Field Air National Guard Base and was controlled by the United States Army Air Corps.

=== Historic Airline Service ===
Delta Air Lines began the first commercial air service to Meridian in 1930. Meridian became a stop on Delta's mainline route between Dallas, Texas and Charleston, South Carolina. Various prop aircraft were used over the years, including the Lockheed Model 10 Electra, Douglas DC-3, Douglas DC-4, Convair 340, and Douglas DC-6. By the 1970s, Delta had initiated jet service to Meridian using the McDonnell Douglas DC-9-30. On Feb. 1, 1976, the Official Airline Guide (OAG) listed two flights a day operated by Delta with the DC-9, including a daily nonstop flight from Atlanta and a daily direct flight from Dallas Fort Worth International Airport, which made two intermediate stops en route at Monroe, Louisiana and Jackson, Mississippi. Delta's mainline jet service ended in the spring of 1979. Delta would eventually return to Meridian with its service in 1985, operating as the Delta Connection via a code sharing agreement by Atlantic Southeast Airlines (ASA). Delta flew nonstop from both Atlanta and Memphis flown with de Havilland Canada DHC-7 Dash 7 and Embraer EMB-110 Bandeirante turboprop aircraft.

Southern Airways began serving Meridian in 1962 with direct flights to Atlanta, Memphis, and New Orleans, making intermediate stops en route at other cities. Southern was operating Douglas DC-3 and Martin 4-0-4 prop aircraft at this time. By 1968, Southern had introduced DC-9 jet service to Meridian and began nonstop flights to Atlanta. According to the Feb. 1, 1976 OAG, Southern was operating five flights a day into Meridian, all with Douglas DC-9-10 jets, and nonstop from Birmingham, Alabama, Columbus, Mississippi and Laurel/Hattiesburg, Mississippi, with direct service from Atlanta, Chicago O'Hare Airport, Memphis and Tuscaloosa, Alabama.

In 1979 Southern merged with North Central Airlines, and the combined airlines were renamed Republic Airlines. The Dec. 1, 1979 OAG lists Republic as the only airline serving Meridian at this time, with the carrier operating Douglas DC-9-10 and larger McDonnell Douglas DC-9-50 jets on nonstop and direct one-stop flights from Atlanta. The carrier also operated nonstop from Laurel/Hattiesburg, nonstop Convair 580 turboprop flights from Memphis, and direct one-stop Convair 580 flights from New Orleans. Republic continued to serve Meridian with DC-9 jets as well as Convair 580 turboprop aircraft until 1984.

Three commuter airlines came to Meridian in 1984 after Republic ended service. Scheduled Skyways and Sunbelt Airlines began service to Memphis, and Atlantic Southeast Airlines started flights to Atlanta. Sunbelt went out of business later in 1984, and Skyways merged into Air Midwest in 1985 but ended service to Meridian within a few months. Before merging with Air Midwest in 1985, Scheduled Skyways was operating four direct flights a day into Meridian from Memphis with Nord 262 and Fairchild Swearingen Metroliner commuter prop jets, with all of these flights making an intermediate en-route stop in Tupelo, Mississippi.

Atlantic Southeast Airlines (ASA), operating as the Delta Connection on behalf of Delta Air Lines, resumed Delta service to Meridian. The carrier used Embraer EMB 110 Bandeirante, Embraer EMB 120 Brasilia, and de Havilland Canada DHC-7 Dash 7 turboprop aircraft and added service to Memphis for several years during the mid-1980s. By the late 1990s, service to Dallas/Fort Worth (DFW) was operated with a stop in Lafayette, Louisiana. By the early 2000s, the DFW flights had ended, and ASA introduced Bombardier CRJ100/200 regional jets on nonstop flights to Atlanta. ASA/Delta Connection service to Meridian ended in 2012.

Republic Express, operated by Express Airlines I on behalf of Republic Airlines via a code sharing agreement, brought back Republic service in 1985 with flights to Memphis. Republic then merged with Northwest Airlines in 1986 and Northwest Airlink took over Republic Express on behalf of Northwest. The carrier operated Jetstream 31 and Saab 340 turboprop aircraft, with this service continuing until 2002. The flights to and from Memphis would also make stops at Columbus, Georgia, Jackson, Mississippi, Tupelo, Mississippi, or Laurel/Hattiesburg.

American Eagle served Meridian on behalf of American Airlines via a code sharing agreement with flights to American's hub in Nashville from 1986 until 1992. The carrier flew Fairchild Swearingen Metroliner and British Aerospace Jetstream 31 commuter prop jet aircraft.

By 2012, service to Meridian became subsidized under the Essential Air Service act, and Silver Airways was selected to serve the city after the departure of Delta Connection. Silver provided flights to Atlanta using Saab 340 aircraft for two years, ending service in 2014.

American Eagle returned to Meridian in 2014 with flights to Dallas/Fort Worth and Chicago. This service was operated by SkyWest Airlines using Bombardier CRJ100/200 regional jets.

In 2020, service was shifted to United Express with flights to the George Bush Intercontinental Airport in Houston. The United Express flights are operated by SkyWest Airlines with CRJ-200 jets.

== Air National Guard Use ==
Key Field is home to the Mississippi Air National Guard's 186th Air Refueling Wing (186 ARW), at the Air National Guard enclave, Key Field Air National Guard Base. Operationally gained by the Air Mobility Command (AMC), the 186 ARW operates a fleet of KC-135R Stratotanker aerial refuelling and cargo aircraft.

Key Field is also home to the Mississippi Army National Guard's 111th Army Aviation Support Facility, Company B. The 111th operates a fleet of CH-47 Chinook helicopters, a multipurpose transport/cargo helicopter capable of carrying 55 troops and gear and can also sling-load up to 25,000 pounds.

Navy T-45 Goshawk aircraft from nearby NAS Meridian and Air Force T-6A, T-1A and T-38C aircraft from Columbus AFB also frequently practice approaches and other procedures over Key Field.

Aircraft Rescue and Firefighting (ARFF) capabilities are provided by the Air National Guard due to Key Field's stationing of the 186 ARW.

In 2008, the 186 ARW entered into an arrangement with the active Air Force, hosting an operational training detachment for USAF-operated MC-12W aircraft under a program known as Project Liberty. The MC-12W is a USAF intelligence, surveillance and reconnaissance (ISR) platform which was fielded in 2008 and 2009 to meet Iraq War and War in Afghanistan ground support ISR requirements. A derivative of the C-12 Huron, the MC-12W Liberty platform was created in response to Defense Secretary Robert Gates' initiative to better support war fighters on the ground with increased ISR in theatre. USAF plans to procure 38 MC-12W aircraft. Mission qualification training in the MC-12W is currently conducted by a combined active Air Force and Air National Guard detachment embedded with the 186 ARW at Key Field.

According to the 2005 Base Realignment and Closure Commission Report, the 186 ARW is to be reassigned per recommendation #97, distributing its KC-135R aircraft between the Air National Guard's 101 ARW, 128 ARW, and 134 ARW, in Maine, Wisconsin, and Tennessee, respectively. The BRAC Report also states that the 186 ARW's aircraft rescue and firefighting (ARFF) positions are to be reassigned to the Mississippi Air National Guard's 172nd Airlift Wing (172 AW), an AMC-gained C-17 Globemaster III unit at Jackson International Airport. These transfers are to take place in 2010 and 2011, although the recent addition of the MC-12W Project Liberty program at Key Field may delay or eliminate the ARFF reassignment.

In 2011, the same year that the 2005 BRAC realignments were to be completed, the 186th ARW expected to receive two new missions. According to former Mississippi Governor Haley Barbour and State Adjutant General Harold Cross, these missions were to be a new Joint Cargo Aircraft mission and an Air Force War Fighting Headquarters. According to Tom Williams, CEO of Meridian Airport Authority, this would result in an increase in local jobs at Meridian's Air National Guard facility.

The 286th Air Operations Group activated on April 8, 2011, to support the missions of the Continental US NORAD Region and 1st Air Force (Air Forces Northern) at Tyndall Air Force Base, Florida. The new group belongs to Key Field's 186th Air Refueling Wing..

== Facilities and aircraft ==
- Old Terminal Building, Hangar, and Powerhouse at Key Field
- U.S. National Register of Historic Places
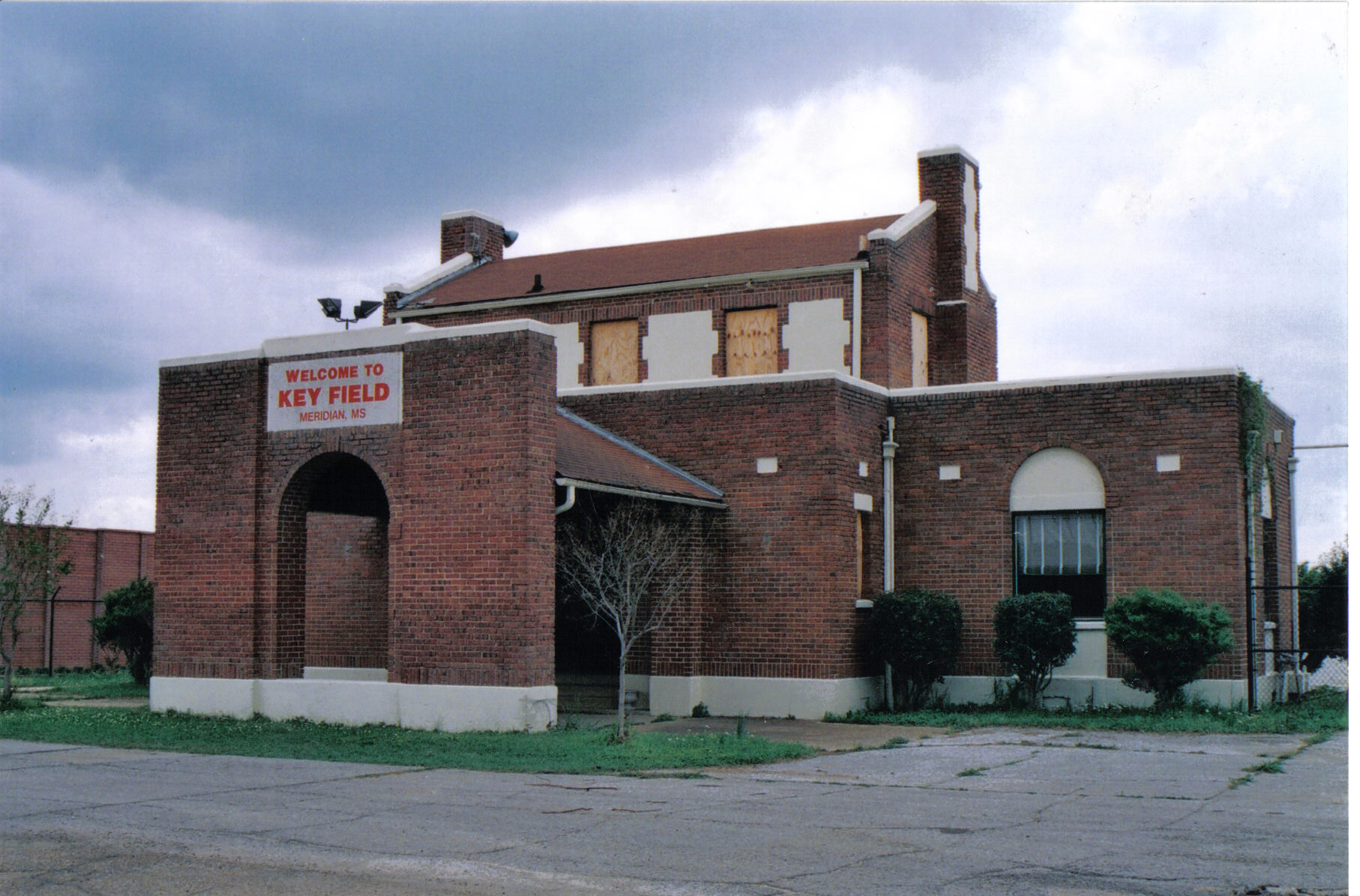
- The old terminal building
- Location: 2525 US 11 S, Meridian, Mississippi
- Coordinates: 32°20′14″N 88°44′33″W
- Area: 1.6 acres (0.65 ha)
- Built: 1930
- NRHP reference No.: 03000587
- Added to NRHP: July 7, 2003

Key Field covers an area of 1,000 acres (405 ha) at an elevation of 298 feet (91 m) above mean sea level. It has two runways: 1/19 is 10,003 by 150 feet (3,049 x 46 m) with an asphalt and concrete surface; 4/22 is 4,599 by 150 feet (1,402 x 46 m) with an asphalt surface. Most of the site is paved in asphalt, with a large parking area in front of the terminal. Only small areas around the buildings are unpaved, and landscaping is limited to the terminal, which has shrubbery and an ornamental tree.

The old terminal building, hangar, and powerhouse at Key Field together form the earliest surviving airport complex in the state of Mississippi. After being listed under the National Register for Historic Places, the buildings were rehabilitated for use as a Cessna flight training school and repair shop.

The old terminal building is a two-story brick building with a gabled roof and parapeted end walls. Facing east toward Highway 11, the building is supported by a concrete foundation. The side wings and front pavilion of the terminal have flat parapet roofs and a gable-roofed porte-cochère extends from the front pavilion and terminates at a taller brick wall that contains a large arched opening. The front pavilion has another arched opening that leads to a recessed entrance. A one-story polygonal porch is in the rear, facing the airfield. Arched openings in the side wings flank the porch. The second floor, a single room that originally housed the weather bureau, has a central door that opens onto the porch roof, forming an observation deck overlooking the airfield. The interior of the building contains a waiting room with the former manager's office to the north and the baggage and mailroom to the south. All the walls in the building are plastered and the floors are vinyl tile.

The rectangular hangar accommodates 10 planes. The building is made of brick and has a concrete foundation. The roof is gabled, and the walls have parapets. The end walls are capped by pent roofs and decorative brick panels encased by stucco. The north and south ends contain eight large sliding metal doors which allow planes to roll in. The interior has a concrete floor, unfinished brick walls, and an unfinished ceiling with exposed steel trusses. There is a small office and washroom on the east end, and a staircase leads to a narrow second floor room that overlooks the workroom and hangar storage area. Located on the east side of the hangar, the Powerhouse is a one-story, one-by-one bay building with another gabled roof and parapet walls. Entrance is gained through a door on the south side of the building, and the only other openings are a metal window on the east side, and a small vent on the west side.

For the 12-month period ending March 31, 2021, the airport had 86,751 aircraft operations: 71% military, 25% general aviation, 4% air taxi, and <1% scheduled commercial. At that time there were 78 aircraft based at this airport: 44 single-engine, 7 multi-engine, 5 jet, 3 helicopter, 1 glider, and 18 military.

Meridian Regional Airport Authority operates Meridian Aviation, a full service fixed-base operator (FBO) on the airport.

== Airline and destinations ==
Airlines	Destinations
United Express	Houston–Intercontinental

Destinations map
Destinations from Meridian Regional Airport

=== Statistics ===
Top domestic destinations: (May 2024 – April 2025)
Rank	Airport name & IATA code	Passengers	Airline
1	Houston–Intercontinental	18,090	United Express

== Accidents and Incidents at MEI ==
- On June 9, 1944, a USAAF Lockheed Model 18 Lodestar suffered a landing accident at then Meridian-Key Field. All occupants survived.
- On November 10, 1946, Delta Air Lines Flight DL10, a Douglas DC-3 which departed Jackson, Mississippi, attempted to land at MEI during a thunderstorm, but experienced runway excursion after landing. The aircraft went beyond the end of the runway, up the western slope of a ditch next to a highway that connected to the airport, bounced over said highway, and stopped with the nose extending partially over a railroad right-of-way. All 3 crew members and 19 passengers survived, but the aircraft was written off.

== See also ==
- List of airports in Mississippi

== Other sources ==
- Essential Air Service documents (Docket DOT-OST-2008-0112) from the U.S. Department of Transportation:
  - Ninety-day notice (March 17, 2008): of Atlantic Southeast Airlines, Inc. (ASA) of intent to discontinue its unsubsidized service between Meridian, Mississippi and Atlanta, Georgia after June 15, 2008.
  - Order 2008-3-24 (March 25, 2008): prohibiting Atlantic Southeast Airlines, Inc., d/b/a Delta Connection, from suspending service at Meridian, Mississippi, and requesting proposals by April 23 from carriers interested in providing replacement essential air service (EAS).
  - Order 2008-5-12 (May 13, 2008): selecting Atlantic Southeast Airlines, Inc. d/b/a Delta Connection, (ASA) to provide essential air service at Meridian, Mississippi, at an annual subsidy rate of $686,489. The rate extends through June 30, 2010.
  - Order 2010-5-28 (May 25, 2010): re-selecting Atlantic Southeast Airlines, Inc., d/b/a Delta Connection (ASA), to provide essential air service (EAS) at Meridian, Mississippi, at an annual subsidy rate of $678,936. The selection extends from July 1, 2010, through June 30, 2012.
  - Notice of Intent (April 9, 2014): of Silver Airways Corp. ... to discontinue subsidized scheduled air service between Atlanta, Georgia ("ATL") and Meridian, Mississippi ("MEl"). Silver Airways intends to discontinue this service effective July 8, 2014.
  - Order 2014-4-24 (April 22, 2014): prohibits Silver Airways Corp., from terminating service at Muscle Shoals, Alabama, Greenville, Laurel/Hattiesburg, Meridian, and Tupelo, Mississippi, for 30 days beyond the end of the air carrier's 90-day notice period, i.e. August 7, 2014. We are also requesting proposals from air carriers interested in providing Essential Air Service (EAS) at Muscle Shoals, Greenville, Laurel/Hattiesburg, Meridian, and/or Tupelo.
