= Alenia C-27J Spartan =

Military transport aircraft

C-27J Spartan
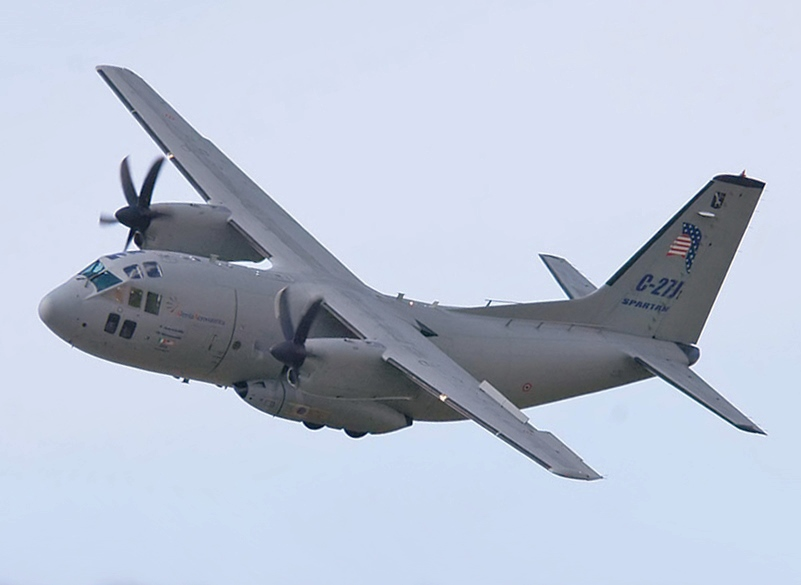
- An Italian Air Force C-27J Spartan

General information
- Type: Military transport aircraft
- National origin: Italy
- Manufacturer: Alenia Aeronautica; Alenia Aermacchi; Leonardo
- Status: In service
- Primary users: Italian Air Force United States Coast Guard; Royal Australian Air Force; See operators below for others
- Number built: 117 as of 2022

History
- Manufactured: 1999–present
- Introduction date: October 2006 (Italy)
- First flight: 24 September 1999
- Developed from: Aeritalia G.222

The Alenia C-27J Spartan is a military transport aircraft developed and manufactured by Leonardo's Aircraft Division, formerly Alenia Aermacchi until 2016. It is an advanced derivative of the former Alenia Aeronautica's earlier G.222 (C-27A Spartan in U.S. service), equipped with the engines and various other systems also used on the larger Lockheed Martin C-130J Super Hercules. Specialized variants of the C-27J have been developed for maritime patrol, search and rescue, C3 ISR (command, control, communications, intelligence, surveillance and reconnaissance), fire support/ground-attack and electronic warfare missions.

In 2007, the C-27J was selected as the Joint Cargo Aircraft (JCA) for the United States military. These were produced in an international teaming arrangement under which L-3 Communications served as the prime contractor. In 2012, the United States Air Force (USAF) retired the C-27J after only a short service life due to budget cuts. They were reassigned to the U.S. Coast Guard and United States Special Operations Command. The C-27J has been ordered by the military air units of Azerbaijan, Australia, Bulgaria, Chad, Greece, Italy, Kenya, Lithuania, Mexico, Morocco, Peru, Romania, Slovakia, Slovenia, and Zambia.

== Design and development ==
In 1995, Alenia and Lockheed Martin began discussions to improve Alenia's G.222 using C-130J's glass cockpit and a more powerful version of the G.222's T64G engine and three-blade propellers. In 1996, a program began on an improved G.222, named C-27J. It used a U.S. military type designation based on the G.222's C-27A designation. In 1997, Alenia and Lockheed Martin formed Lockheed Martin Alenia Tactical Transport Systems (LMATTS) to develop the C-27J. The design changed to use the C-130J Super Hercules's Rolls-Royce AE 2100 engine and six-blade propeller. Other changes include a fully digital MIL-STD-1553 systems and avionics architecture, and an updated cargo compartment for increased commonality. The C-27J has a 35% increase in range and a 15% faster cruise speed than the G.222.

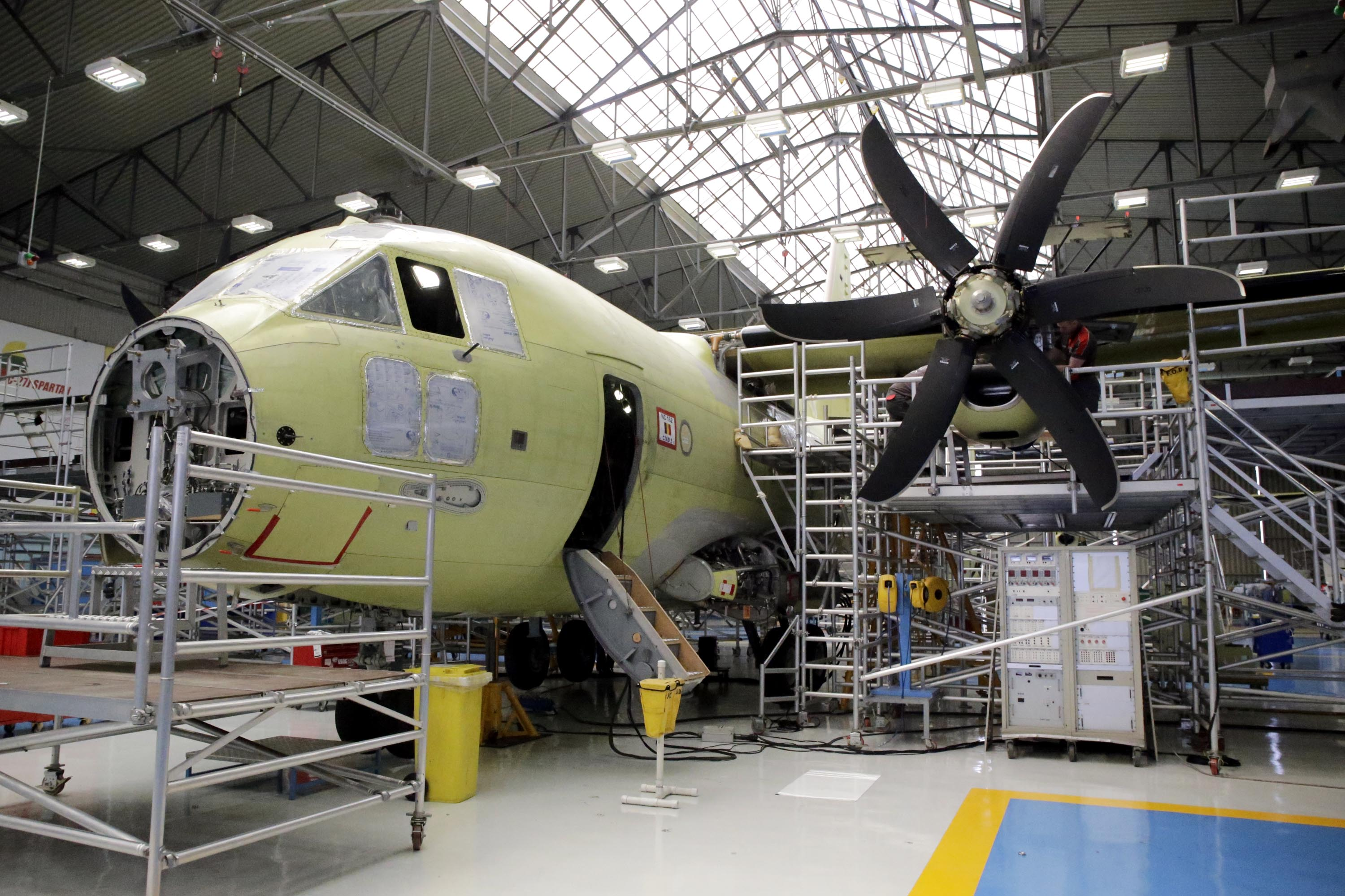
A C-27J Spartan on the assembly line in Italy

The C-27J first flew on 24 September 1999. Two months later, the Italian air force was the launch customer of the C-27J, ordering 12 Spartans. At the time, the C-27J had a basic price of US$24 million. After over 400 hours of flight tests spanning less than 13 months, the aircraft was granted civil certification by the Italian Civil Aviation Authority at the Paris Air Show in June 2001. Military certification followed in December 2001.

In 2005, the U.S. Army identified the need to replace its aging Short C-23 Sherpa lifter. The Army does not operate many fixed wing aircraft (see also Key West Agreement), but they lost a C-23B in 2001 in which 21 died. This was the worst peacetime aviation disaster of the U.S. National Guard. In lieu of adequate fixed-wing airlift availability, the CH-47 helicopter fleet was being worked hard on the "last tactical mile" to supply forward-placed troops. The U.S. Army sought the C-27J for its direct support capabilities, and to reduce demands on the CH-47 fleet.

In 2006, LMATTS was dissolved when Lockheed Martin offered the C-130J in 2006 as a contender in the same U.S. Army and U.S. Air Force Joint Cargo Aircraft (JCA) competition in which the C-27J was competing. Alenia Aeronautica then paired with L-3 Communications, forming the Global Military Aircraft Systems (GMAS) joint venture to market the C-27J; Boeing also joined GMAS.

GMAS bid the C-27J in the JCA competition against Raytheon and EADS North America's C-295 to replace existing Short C-23 Sherpa, Beechcraft C-12 Huron and Fairchild C-26 Metroliners in the Army National Guard, and as a substitute tactical airlifter for Air National Guard groups or wings losing C-130s to retirement or Base Realignment and Closures. In November 2006, the C-27J completed the U.S. Department of Defense's Early User Survey evaluations, flying 26 hours and surpassing all requirements. GMAS announced that the C-27J will be assembled at a facility at Cecil Field, Duval County, Florida. The JCA's final selection was expected in March 2007. It was postponed until June 2007, when the Pentagon awarded of a US$2.04 billion contract for 78 C-27Js, including training and support, to GMAS.

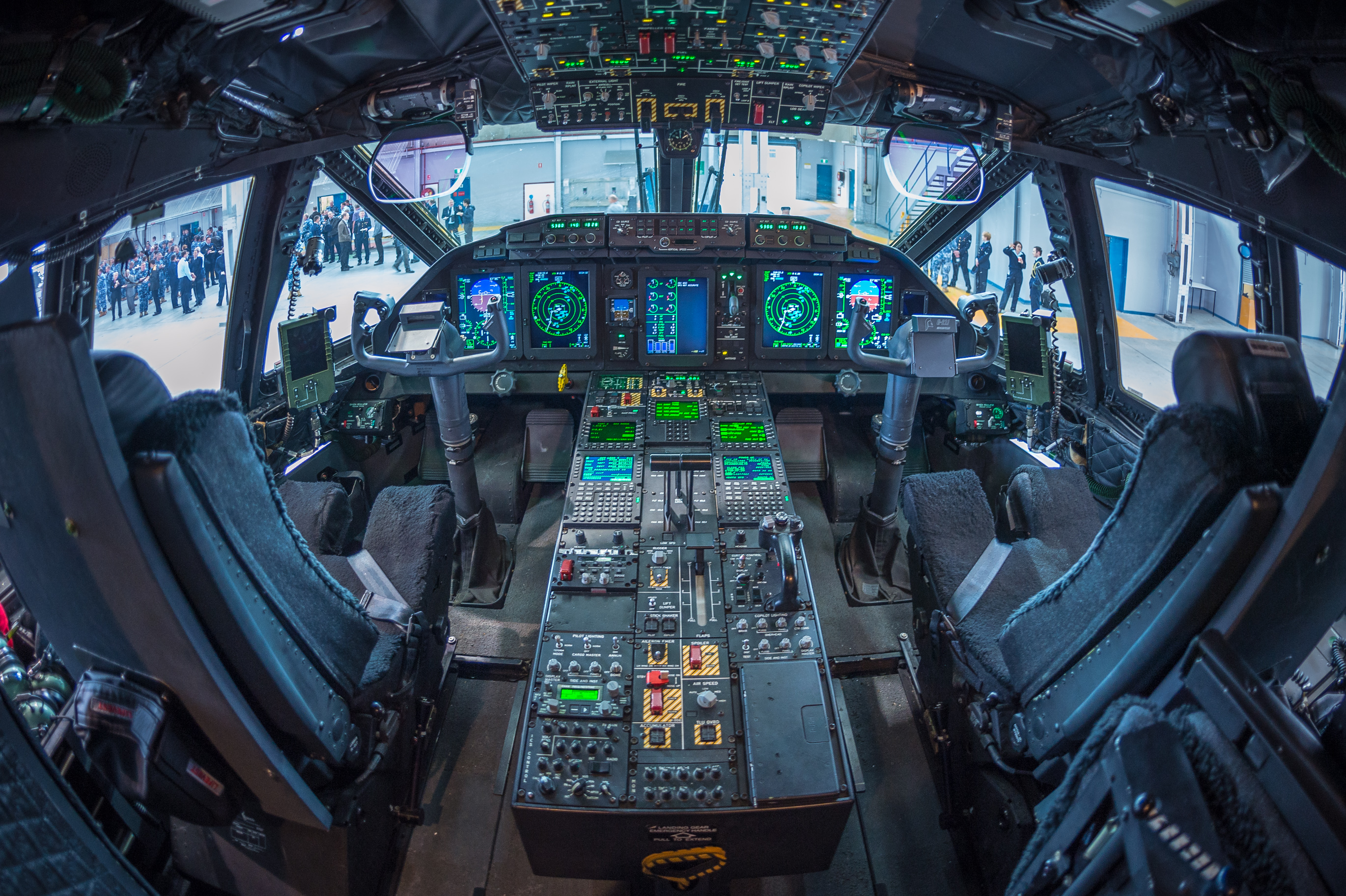
A cockpit view of a RAAF C-27J Spartan

On 22 June 2007, Raytheon formally protested the JCA contract award for the C-27J. In September 2007, the GAO denied Raytheon's protest, thereby allowing the Pentagon to proceed with procurement. At this time, the U.S. Army had a requirement for up to 75 aircraft in the Army National Guard, and the Air Force had a requirement for up to 70 aircraft in the Air Force Special Operations Command and the Air National Guard. The first C-27J was planned to be delivered to the joint U.S. Army–Air Force test and training program in June 2008. The first flight of a U.S. C-27J occurred on 17 June 2008.

As of 2020, orders stand at Australia (10), Bulgaria (3), Chad (2), Greece (8), Italy (12), Kenya (3), Lithuania (3), Mexico (4), Morocco (4), Peru (4), Romania (7), Slovakia (2), Zambia (2), United States (21), and an undisclosed country (2).

In November 2020, Leonardo launched the C-27J Next Generation programme with new equipment, systems and aerodynamic solutions to improve operating efficiency and enhance performance. The New Generation features comprehensive new avionics to comply with the Performance Based Navigation international standard to operate in civil air space without limitations and to enhance interoperability in tactical scenarios, while new winglets contribute to improved climb performance and increase the MTOW by up to 1,000 kg.

== Operational history ==
=== United States ===
The United States received its first C-27J on 25 September 2008. In September 2008, L-3 Link's C-27J schoolhouse began classes at the Georgia Army National Guard Flight Facility, Robins Air Force Base, Georgia. By April 2009, the U.S. Army had accepted deliveries of 2 aircraft and had 11 more on order. In May 2009, the U.S. Army and Army National Guard relinquished all aircraft to the U.S. Air Force, primarily the Air National Guard. This led to the purchase being reduced to 38 C-27Js and the USAF receiving total control of all US C-27J. Initially, the C-27J was to be operated by the Air National Guard for direct support of the United States Army. Later, both the Army National Guard and Air National Guard flight crews support the aircraft's fielding. By July 2010, the U.S. Air National Guard had received four C-27Js for testing and training, with initial operational capability expected in October 2010.

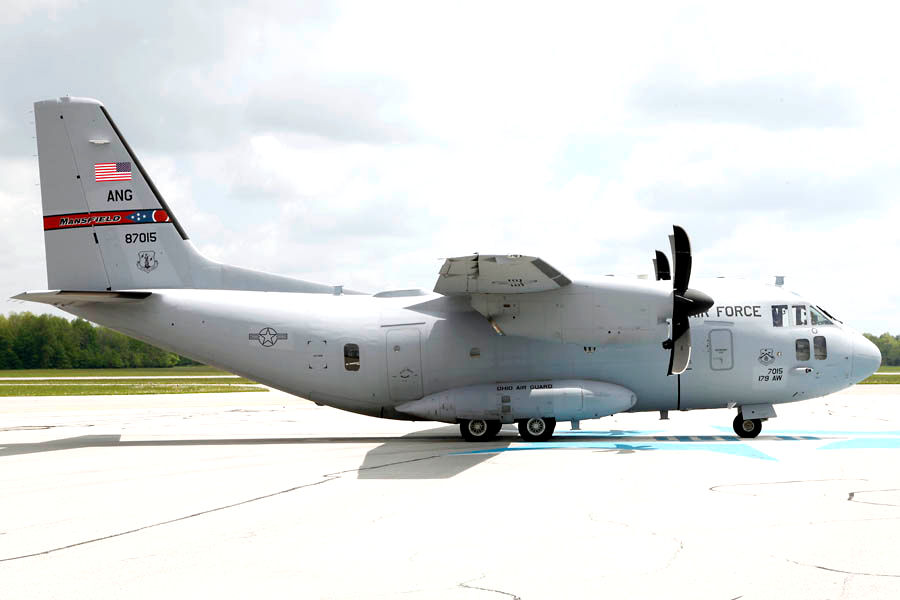
A USAF C-27J of the Ohio Air National Guard's 164th Airlift Squadron in 2010

The U.S. Air Force performed the C-27J's first combat deployment in summer 2011. In August 2011, two C-27Js flown by Air National Guard aircrews, augmented with Army National Guard personnel, began operations at Kandahar Air Field, Afghanistan. Between August 2011 and June 2012, the C-27J of the 179th Airlift Wing, followed by the 175th Wing, executed more than 3,200 missions transporting over 25,000 passengers, and 1,400 tons of cargo. Via tactical control of the C-27J, the U.S. Army was able to employ helicopters more efficiently, splitting missions between the two platforms based on their relative strengths.

In January 2012, the Department of Defense announced plans to retire all 38 USAF C-27Js on order because of excess intra-theater airlift capacity and budgetary pressures, with the C-130 to replace its role. In February 2012, Alenia warned that it would not provide support for C-27J resold by the U.S. to international customers in competition with future orders. In March 2012, the USAF announced the C-27J's retirement in fiscal year 2013 after determining other programs' budgetary needs and requirement changes for a new Pacific strategy. The cut was opposed by the Air National Guard and by various legislators.

In July 2012, the USAF briefly suspended flight operations following a flight control system failure. By 2013, newly built C-27J were being sent directly to the Davis–Monthan Air Force Base boneyard. The USAF spent $567 million on 21 C-27Js since 2007, with 16 delivered by the end of September 2013. 12 had been taken out of service. A further 5 were to be built by April 2014, as they were too near completion to be worth cancelling. Budget cuts motivated the divestiture. A C-27J allegedly costs $308 million over its lifespan, in comparison with a C-130's $213 million 25-year lifespan cost.

In November 2012, the C-27J deployed for its first domestic mission, contributing to the Hurricane Sandy relief effort.

The C-27J had a flyaway cost of US$31.7M in 2012, and an average cost of US$66.2M in 2018.

In July 2013, the United States Coast Guard considered acquiring up to 14 of the 21 retired C-27J and converting them for search-and-rescue missions, while cancelling undelivered orders for the HC-144 Ocean Sentry, to save $500–$800 million. EADS claimed that the HC-144 costs half as much as the C-27J to maintain and operate. The U.S. Forest Service also wanted 7 C-27J for aerial firefighting.

The U.S. Special Operations Command (SOCOM) were interested in acquiring ex-USAF C-27J. If the DoD determined it could not afford the aircraft, they would go to the Forest Service. In late 2013, SOCOM was allocated 7 C-27J to replace its CASA 212 (C-41) training aircraft. In December 2013, the 14 remaining C-27J were transferred to the Coast Guard, with the first HC-27J delivered in Coast Guard colors in April 2016.

=== Others ===
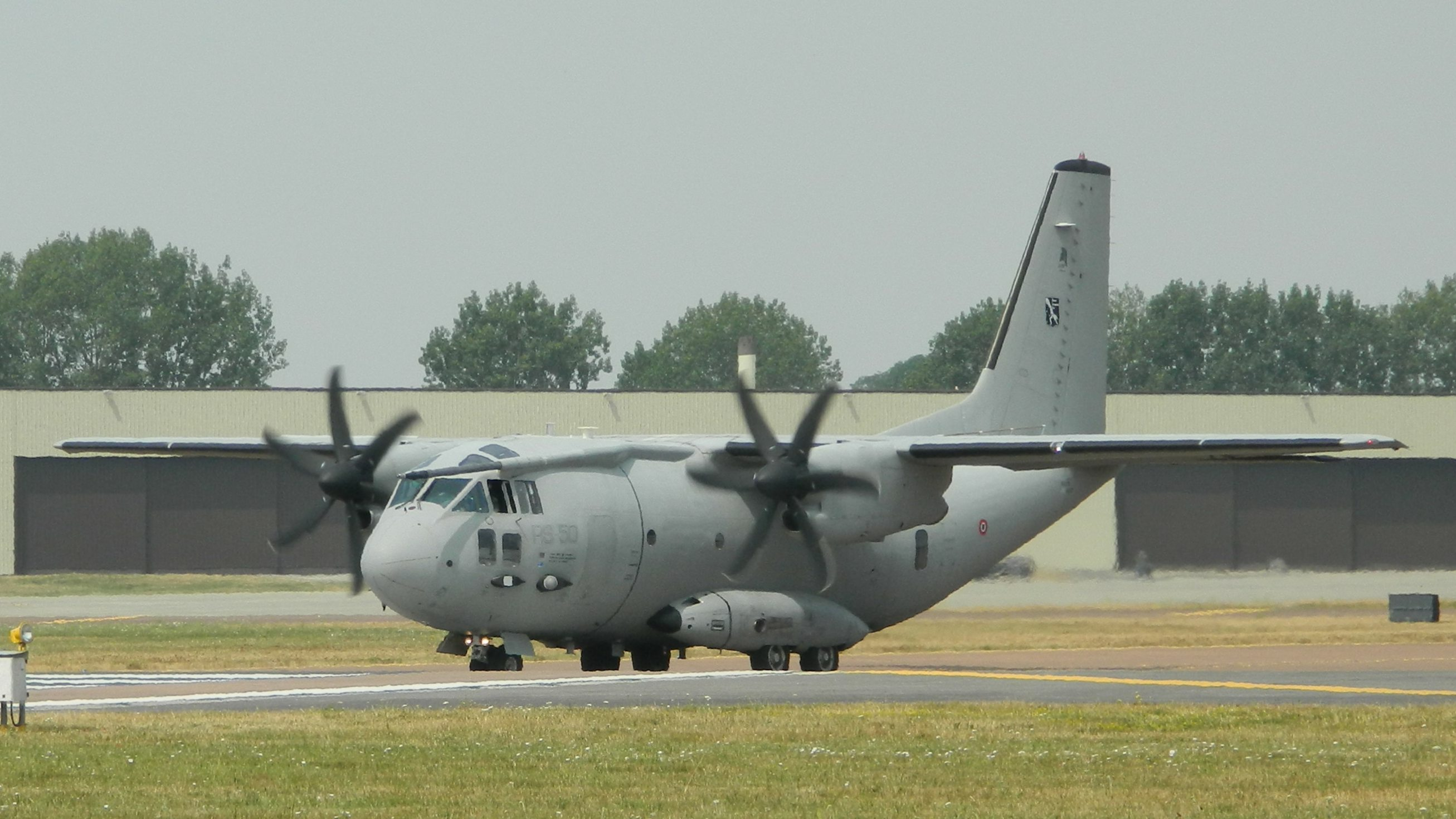
An Italian Air Force C-27J at RAF Fairford, 2013

In October 2006, Italy accepted delivery of the first C-27J of an initial batch of 12 aircraft. In January 2007, the first aircraft was delivered to the 46^{a} Brigata Aerea, in Pisa. The Italian Air Force C-27J have an inflight refueling system and are fitted with a Defensive Aids Sub System (DASS). From September 2008 to January 2009, a pair of Italian Air Force C-27J were deployed to Afghanistan for NATO in-theatre airlift operations.

In December 2013, an Italian C-27J was deployed to the Philippines to participate in international humanitarian relief operations in the aftermath of Typhoon Haiyan. The Italian Air Force is also the launch customer for a special mission variant of the C-27J, named Praetorian in the configuration tailored for ItAF and equipped with ISR equipment and roll-on, roll-off mission systems consoles; Italy is the first European nation to operate such an aircraft.

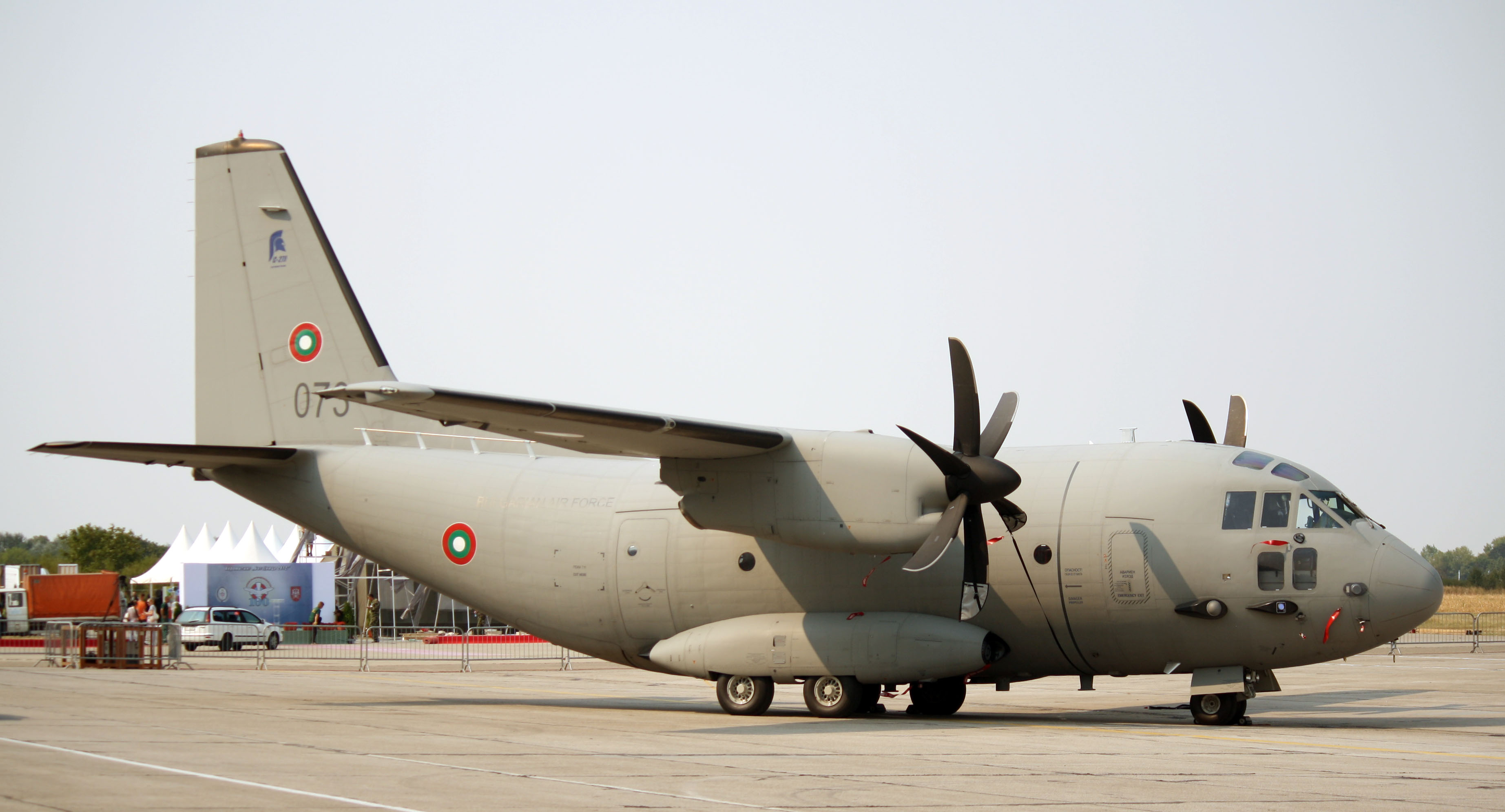
A Bulgarian Air Force C-27J at Batajnica Air Show 2012

In 2006, Bulgaria had initially ordered five C-27Js to replace its aging fleet of Antonov An-26 aircraft, but reduced its order to three aircraft in 2010 due to funding shortages. In March 2011, the Bulgarian Air Force received the third and final of the C-27J ordered. The fleet is employed for military transport missions as well as medical evacuations, special tasks of the Interior Ministry, and participating in international operations such as the rotation of Bulgarian troops in Afghanistan.

In 2006, the Romanian government announced the selection of the C-27J, seeking seven aircraft to be delivered from 2008 to replace Antonov An-24 and Antonov An-26 aircraft, beating the EADS CASA C-295. In February 2007, a legal challenge filed by EADS blocked the Romanian order; the order was allowed to proceed when the Romanian court rejected EADS' complaint in June 2007. In December 2007, a contract for the seven C-27J was signed. In April 2010, the first two C-27s were delivered to the Romanian Air Force.

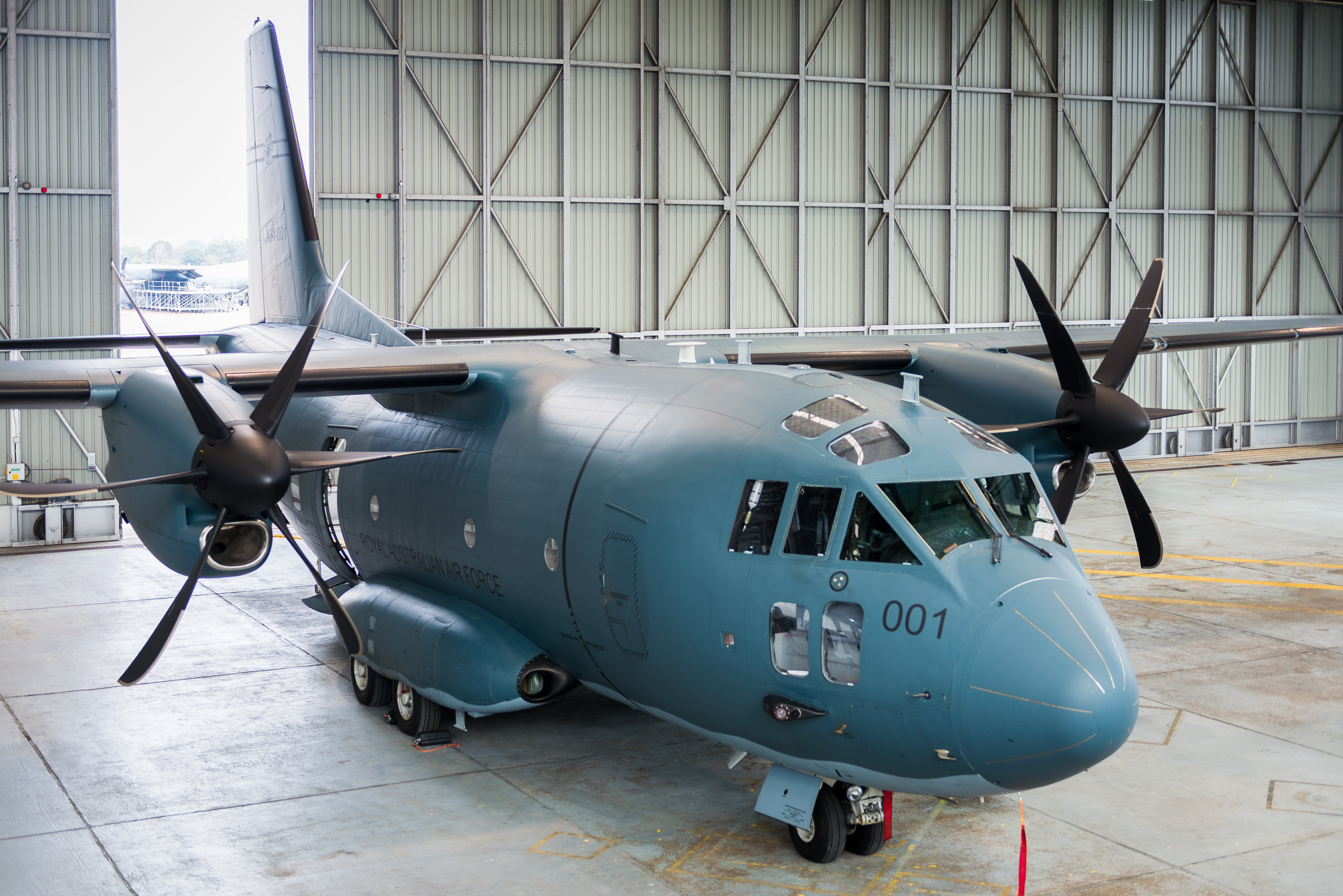
The first RAAF C-27J Spartan arrives at RAAF Base Richmond, 2015

In December 2011, the Royal Australian Air Force (RAAF) issued a Foreign Military Sales request for 10 C-27Js valued at US$950M to replace its retired DHC-4 Caribou fleet. Australia opted for the C-27J over the rival EADS CASA C-295 following a RAAF evaluation, which had noted the C-27J's wider and taller cabin being compatible with the Australian Army's general purpose G-Wagen vehicle, and palletized goods.

In December 2013, the first Australian C-27J performed its maiden flight. In December 2014, the RAAF began maintenance training on the type. Delivery of the first two on order was accepted that month. The last aircraft for the RAAF was delivered in April 2018. In July 2021, the RAAF redefined the C-27J role removing its combat role due to its missile approach warning system. In April 2026, Australia's Minister for Defence Industry Pat Conroy announced that Australia would retire the aircraft due to high costs for their mission of logistics in the Pacific.

In July 2011, the Mexican Air Force signed a $200 million contract for four C-27Js and a multiyear support agreement for the fleet. All four were delivered by the end of 2012. Mexico's C-27Js are based at Santa Lucía Air Force Base Num 1 and operated by 302 Air Squadron, alongside a number of C-130 Hercules.

In June 2013, the Peruvian Air Force was negotiating to acquire four C-27Js for $200 million. The C-27J competed against the EADS CASA C-295, Antonov An-70, Antonov An-32, and C-130J. In November 2013, Peru selected the C-27J. Two aircraft and associated support were purchased in a 100 million-euro deal. In March 2015, the first C-27J was accepted by the Peruvian Air Force. By this point, four C-27Js were on order for the service. The fourth aircraft was delivered in December 2017 to Grupo Aéreo N°8.

In June 2018, Kenya received an international loan for military aircraft and expansion including three C-27Js.

In January 2021, the Slovenian government announced its interest in purchasing one C-27J for the Slovenian Air Force and Air Defence. In November 2021, the Slovenian Ministry of Defense signed a contract for one C-27J to the Slovenian Army. It is to be delivered within one year and equipped with modules for transporting casualties, transporting cargo, and extinguishing forest fires.

=== Possible sales ===
In August 2009, Taiwan entered price negotiations with Alenia Aeronautica for the sale of six C-27Js.

In 2010, the Indian Air Force issued a Request for Information (RFI) for 16 medium military transport aircraft. Alenia Aeronautica responded with data on the C-27J.

In 2011, Indonesia was considering purchasing several C-27J Spartans.

In 2015, Alenia Aermacchi were studying the development of a C-27J maritime patrol variant. Other proposed variants of the platform include a multi-mission C-27J that could be armed with air-launched weapons and equipped with a maritime surveillance radar. Alenia Aermacchi promoted this model to the Royal Air Force.

In 2015, the Ghana Air Force requested four C-27Js via an FMS sale, but the purchase was never completed.

In 2016, Leonardo conducted demonstration flights around La Paz at the request of the Bolivian government, which may lead to Bolivia purchasing the C-27J.

=== Failed bids ===
In 2007, the C-27J was being considered as a sole-source C$3 billion contract by Canada as a replacement for its search and rescue air fleet. Alenia Aermacchi bid their C-27J FWSAR/MPA, a modified C-27J for the Search and rescue and Maritime Patrol Aircraft roles. Exclusive modifications included a mission systems pallet from General Dynamics Mission Systems Canada, additional observation windows, an AESA search radar, satellite and ATC radios, flare/markers launchers, an electro-optical/infrared turret, a new flight management system and other performance upgrades. Alenia Aermacchi bid up to 32 aircraft with lifetime maintenance from KF Aerospace and in-service support from General Dynamics Canada. The C-27J FWSAR/MPA bid competed against the Airbus C-295 FWSAR and the Embraer KC-390. In December 2016, the Canadian government selected the C-295.

In 2012, the C-27J was shortlisted as a candidate for the Philippine Air Force (PAF) medium lift aircraft program. A joint team from the Philippines' Department of National Defense (DND) and PAF inspected the C-27J in January 2012. The DND already received approval from the Philippine president to purchase 3 units, and is awaiting congressional approval as of November 2012. The PAF announced EADS-CASA's (now Airbus) C-295M as the winner for the medium lift aircraft acquisition project.

== Variants ==
=== AC-27J Stinger II ===
The AC-27J was a proposed gunship for the U.S. Air Force. In 2008, US$32 million was reallocated to buy a C-27J for the U.S. Air Force Special Operations Command, to fulfill requirements defined by AFSOC for the AC-XX concept, a replacement for the aging Lockheed AC-130s. It was to use proven systems to reduce risk. AFSOC planned for 16 gunships, the first in 2011 and two more per year up to 2015. The AC-27J was to be a multi-mission platform, equipped with full-motion cameras and outfitted to support covert infiltration and other ground operations, armed with either a 30-millimeter or 40-millimeter gun or precision-guided munitions such as the Viper Strike bomb. At the Air Force Association's 2008 conference, it was named "Stinger II" after the AC-119K Stinger.

In October 2008, C-27A 90-0170 was removed from storage at AMARC and delivered to Eglin AFB, Florida, for use by the Air Force Research Laboratory to test the feasibility of mounting of 30 mm and 40 mm guns. In May 2009, the program was put on hold because U.S. Army funding for 40 C-27s in an Army–Air Force cooperative purchase was removed from the fiscal 2010 budget. U.S. Air Force Special Operations Command elected to standardize their fleet with the C-130 to meet its gunship needs.

=== HC-27J ===
The HC-27J is a modified surveillance variant for the U.S. Coast Guard. Fourteen former U.S. Air Force (Air National Guard) C-27J are to be modified into HC-27J for maritime patrol, surveillance, medium-range search and rescue, drug and migrant interdiction, and disaster response missions. Deliveries of the C-27J to the USCG began in November 2014. First flight of a HC-27J occurred in September 2023. The HC-27J is to replace HC-130H Hercules aircraft at USCG air stations. Due to budget constraints, replacement with HC-130J aircraft is not possible. The Coast Guard plans to decommission its C-27J by the end of fiscal year 2028.

=== MC-27J ===
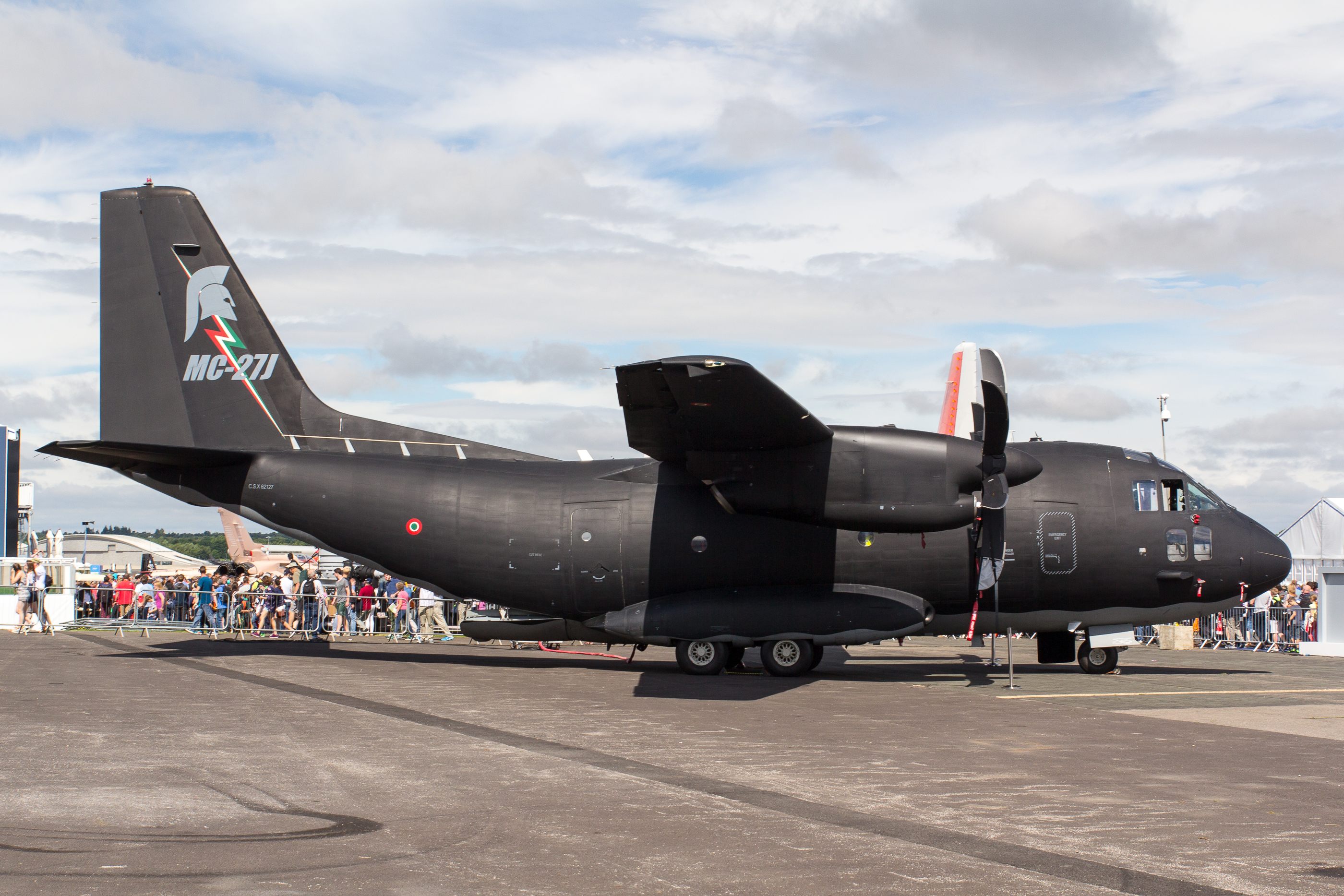
MC-27J CSX62127 at the 2016 Farnborough Airshow

The MC-27J is a variant for multi-mission purposes, including Command and Control, Communications, Intelligence, Surveillance, Reconnaissance (C3-ISR), Signal Intelligence (SIGINT) and Combat Support operations, using roll-off/roll-on systems for different sensors and equipment: AESA Search Radar; Elettro-Optical/Infra-Red (EO/IR) system; Electronic Support Measures (ESM); palletized Mission System; enhanced Communications System including datalink and SATCOM capabilities; Store Management System to employ Precision Guided Munitions (PGM – one hard point under each wing); palletized fire support system with a high accurate gun able to fire through the LH rear door, that can be installed and rapidly uninstalled when not required.

The MC-27J can support special forces and ground troops with direct fire, performing armed ISR, Close Air Support (CAS) and Combat Search And Rescue (CSAR). It also has a defensive aids suite. In 2012, Alenia Aermacchi stated it would offer an upgrade program to the MC-27J configuration. The MC-27J was developed as an Alenia Aermacchi-Orbital private venture.

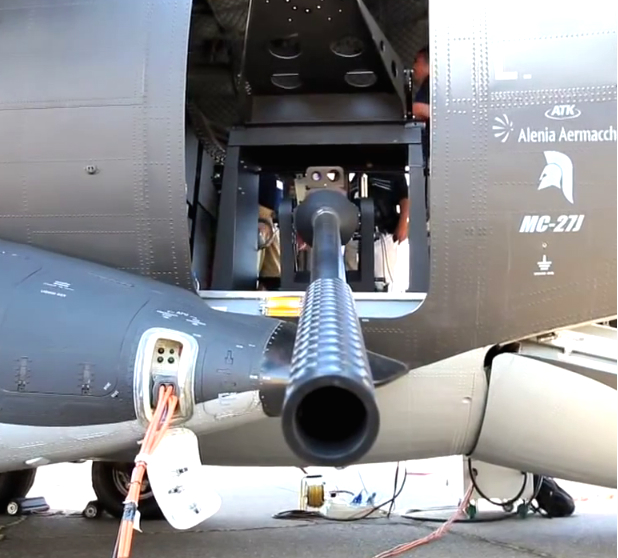
A MC-27J 30 mm cannon

The Italian Air Force converted three C-27Js into MC-27J in 2016. In March 2014, the first MC-27J, named Praetorian in the configuration tailored for Italian Air Force, performed its maiden flight. In July 2014, the MC-27J completed the first phase of ground and flight testing with the Italian Air Force. In October 2020, the annual Documento Programmatico Pluriennale (DPP) 2020-2022 of Italian Minister of Defence indicates realization of the MC-27J to support special operations.

=== EC-27 "Jedi" ===
In 2010, the Italian Air Force announced the development of an electronic warfare package for its C-27 fleet under the jamming and electronic defence instrumentation (Jedi) program. One publicised ability of the aircraft is the disruption of radio communications and, in particular, remote detonators commonly used on improvised explosive devices (IEDs).

The EC-27 has been compared to the capabilities of the USAF's Lockheed EC-130H Compass Call. In 2015, it was revealed that an improved Jedi 2 payload was under development to provide increased electronic warfare capabilities.

== Operators ==
A map of C-27J operators in blue

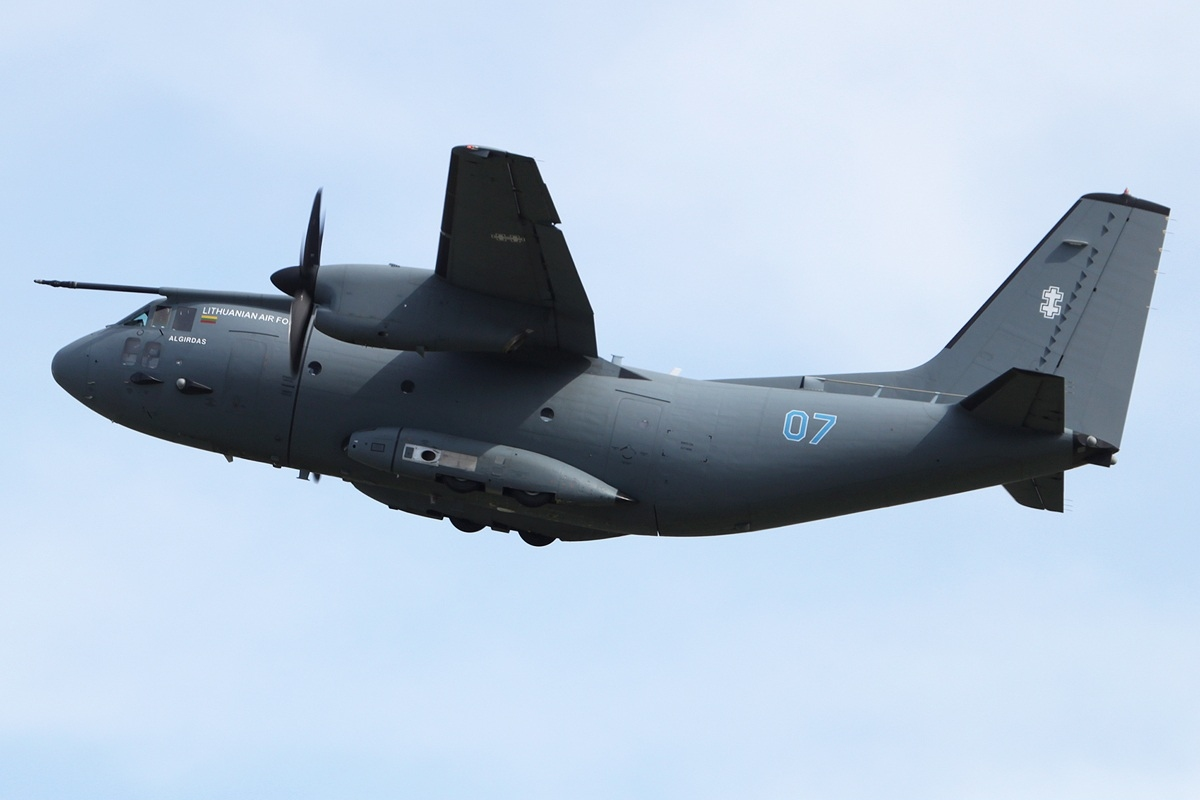
Lithuanian Air Force C-27J with an aerial refuelling probe

=== Current operators ===
Australia
Royal Australian Air Force ordered ten C-27Js.
The first Spartan arrived in Australia in 2015 and the last and 10th plane was delivered in April 2018. They are operated by No. 35 Squadron. As part of Australia's 2026 National Defence Strategy it was announced that they will be retired and replaced with commercial aircraft.
Azerbaijan
Azerbaijani Air Force ordered two C-27Js in 2023. The first Spartan arrived in Azerbaijan in June 2024.
Bulgaria
Bulgarian Air Force has three C-27Js in service as of May 2024. with the 1/16 Transport Squadron Vrazhdebna Air Base.
Chad
Chadian Air Force operates two C-27Js, originally received in 2013 and 2014.
Greece
Hellenic Air Force has eight C-27Js in use as of January 2012 with the 354th TTS "Pegasus" (112th Combat Wing – Air Force Support Command).
Italy
Italian Air Force has 12 aircraft in operation as of January 2012, with the 98th Gruppo/46th Air Brigade.
Kenya
Kenya Air Force operates three C-27Js. Two were delivered in January 2019, and the third one in October 2020.
Lithuania
Lithuanian Air Force has three C-27Js in service as of January 2012.
Mexico
Mexican Air Force has four C-27Js in service as of January 2012, with the 302 Air Squadron.
Morocco
Royal Moroccan Air Force has four C-27J in use as of January 2012, with the 3rd Air Force Base (3rd BAFRA).
Peru
Peruvian Air Force has four C-27J in service with the Grupo Aéreo N°8.
Romania
Military operator:
- Romanian Air Force has seven C-27Js in service as of January 2015, operated by the 902nd Airlift and Aerophotogrammetry Squadron of the 90th Airlift Base.
Governmental operator:
- Ministry Of Internal Affairs - General Inspectorate Of Aviation: two C-27J NGs on order, funded through SAFE. They will be used both in Romania and within Europefor cooperation missions in the field of emergency management.
Saudi Arabia
Military operator:
- Royal Saudi Navy ordered four C-27JNG MPAs in February 2026, with deliveries starting in 2029.
Civilian operator:
- ARAMCO ordered two C-27Js in June 2025.
Slovakia
Slovak Air Force operates two C-27Js, allocated to the 46th Wing based at Malacky Air Base.
Slovenia
Slovenian Air Force and Air Defence has two C-27J. The first was received in December 2023 and the second in December 2024.
Tanzania
Tanzania Air Force ordered two C-27Js in January 2024.
Turkmenistan
Turkmen Air Force ordered two C-27Js with the first delivered on 6 June 2021.
United States
US Armed forces operators:
- United States Army Special Operations Aviation Command: seven C-27J transferred from USAF.
- United States Coast Guard: 14 C-27Js transferred from USAF, converted to HC-27J configuration.
Zambia
Zambia Air Force ordered two C-27Js in September 2015, with one being operated for United Nations Interim Security Force for Abyei.

=== Former operators ===
United States
United States Air Force: 21 delivered. 12 were placed into service. Further orders cancelled and taken out of service due to budget cuts, later transferred to the US Army and Coast Guard.
- 135th Airlift Squadron, Maryland Air National Guard, 2011-2013
- 153d Air Refueling Squadron, Mississippi Air National Guard
- 164th Airlift Squadron, Ohio Air National Guard

== Specifications ==
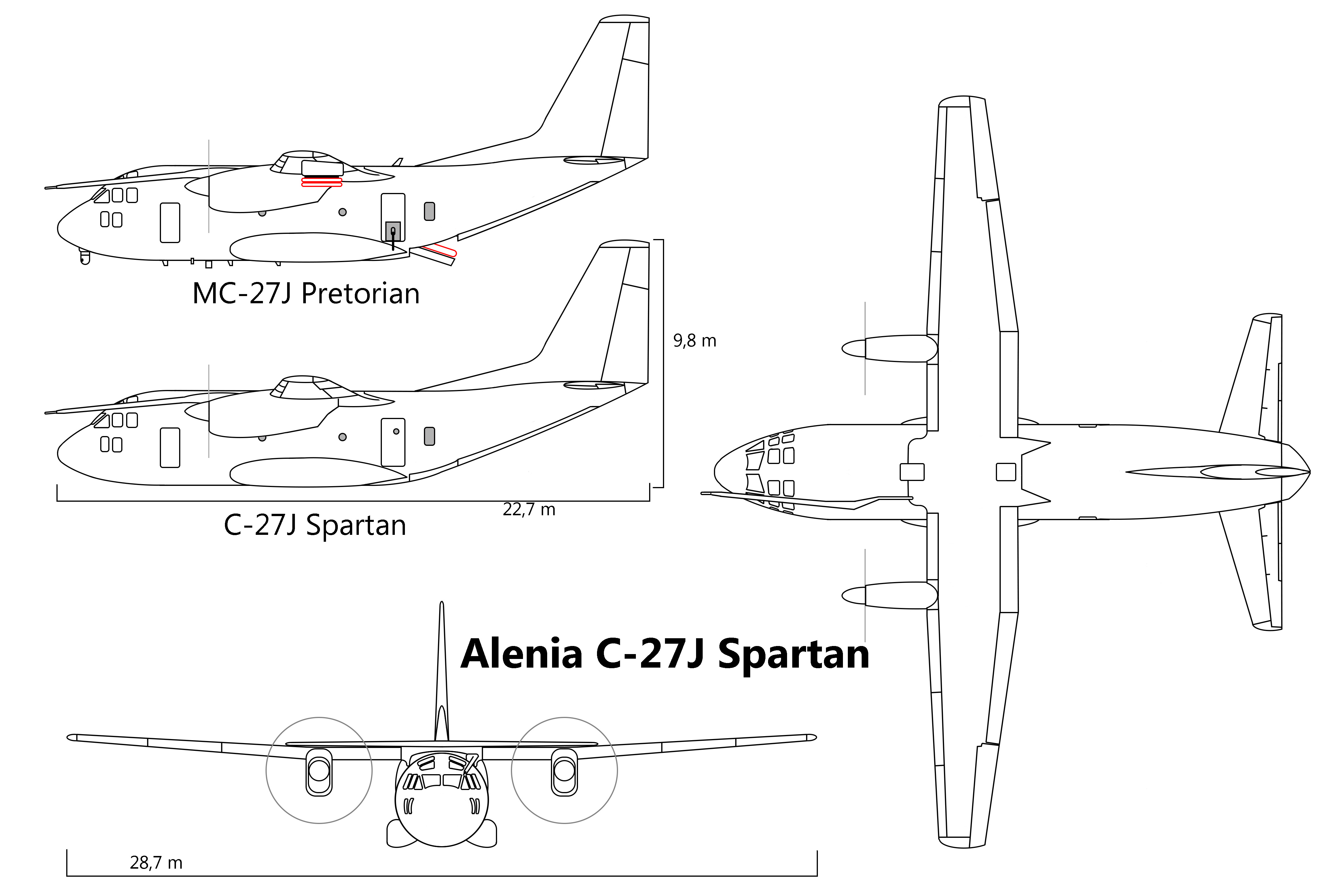
Line drawings

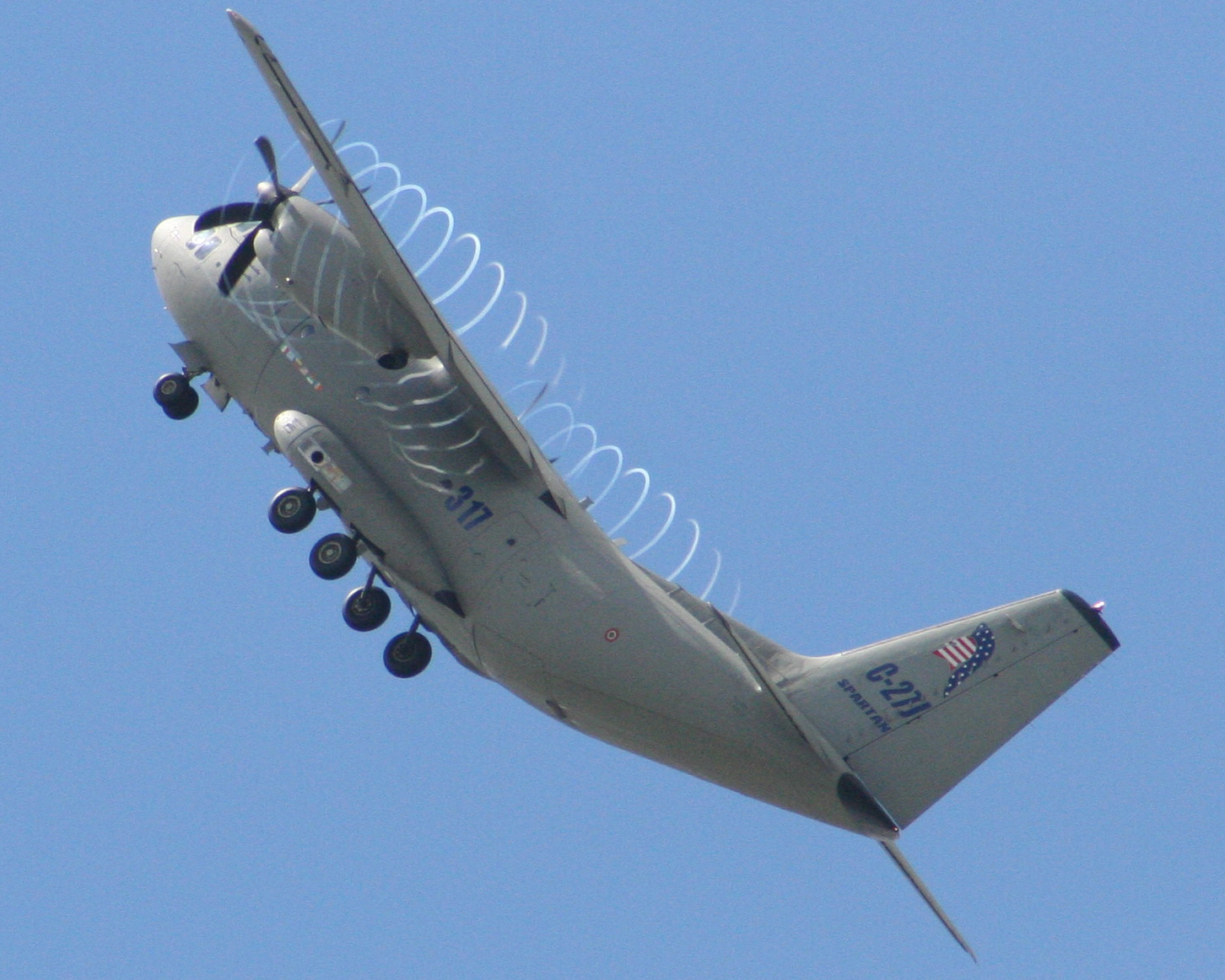
A C-27J performing at the Paris Air Show with Prop vortices condensation visible.

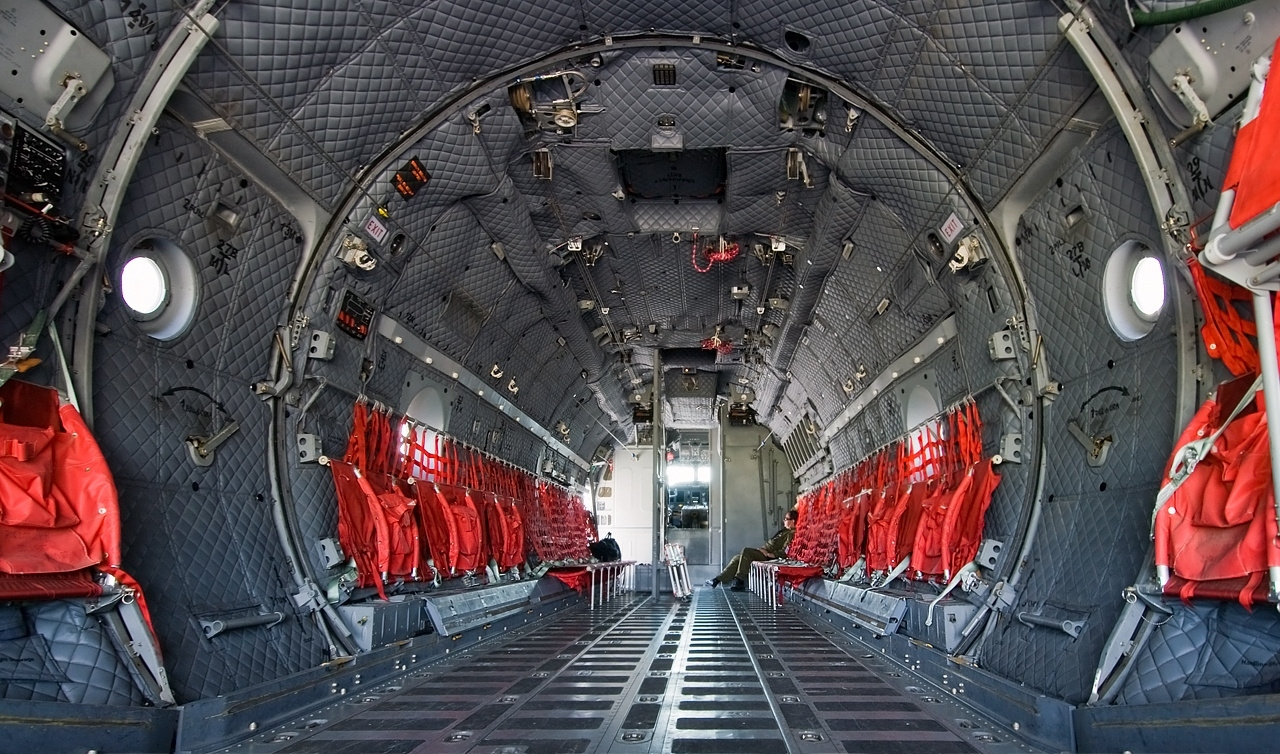
Inside the C-27J's cabin

Data from Alenia Aermacchi, C-27J facts, and Leonardo C-27J brochure

General characteristics

- Crew: Minimum two: pilot, co-pilot (plus loadmaster when needed)
- Capacity:

Troop transport: 60 troops or 46 paratroopers
Medevac/Casevac: 36 standard stretchers with 6 medical attendants
VIP and personnel: 6 VIP and 18 escort passengers plus a service module
Cargo transport: Bulk loads, wheeled and tracked vehicles, aircraft engines, light helicopters, or 463L standard pallets (3 HCU-6/E + 1 HCU-12/E, or 6 HCU-12/E)
Cargo airdrop: Up to 9,000 kg (20,000 lb) with two platforms; up to 6 A22 CDS bundles; up to 5,000 kg (11,000 lb) with 1 or 2 platforms by LAPES; up to 6,000 kg (13,000 lb) by combat off-load – 3 HCU-6/E pallets
Firefighting: Up to 6 "Guardian" system containers; 6,000 L (1,300 imp gal; 1,600 US gal) of water/fire retardant; roll-off/roll-on fire attack system with 7,950 L (1,750 imp gal; 2,100 US gal) capacity
Cargo compartment: 3.33 by 2.60 m (10 ft 11 in by 8 ft 6 in) width and height

- Length: 22.7 m (74 ft 6 in)
- Wingspan: 28.7 m (94 ft 2 in)
- Height: 9.64 m (31 ft 8 in)
- Wing area: 82 m^{2} (880 sq ft)
- Empty weight: 17,500 kg (38,581 lb)
- Max takeoff weight: 32,500 kg (71,650 lb)
- Max payload: 11,300 kilograms (24,912 lb) at MTOW
- Powerplant: 2 × Rolls-Royce AE2100-D2A turboprop, 3,458 kW (4,637 hp) each
- Propellers: 6-bladed Dowty Propeller R 391/6-132-F/10, 4.115 m (13 ft 6 in) diameter

Performance

- Maximum speed: 602 km/h (374 mph, 325 kn)
- Cruise speed: 583 km/h (362 mph, 315 kn)
- Minimum control speed: 194 km/h (121 mph, 105 kn)
- Range: 1,759 km (1,093 mi, 950 nmi) with MTOW of 31,800 kg (70,100 lb)
- Range at 4,536 kg (10,000 lb) payload: 5,056 km (3,142 mi; 2,730 nmi)
- Ferry range: 5,852 km (3,636 mi, 3,160 nmi)
- Service ceiling: 9,144 m (30,000 ft)
- g limits: 3
- Rate of climb: 13 m/s (2,500 ft/min)

== See also ==
Related development

- Aeritalia G.222
- Lockheed Martin C-130J Super Hercules

Aircraft of comparable role, configuration, and era

- EADS CASA C-295
- CASA CN-235
- Antonov An-32
- Antonov An-132
- Ilyushin Il-112
