= United States Army Adjutant General's Corps =

Branch of the U.S. Army

Adjutant General's Corps
- Branch insignia
- Active: 16 June 1775
- Country: United States
- Branch: U.S. Army
- Type: Adjutant General
- Role: Personnel
- Home station: Fort Jackson, South Carolina
- Mottos: "Defend and Serve"
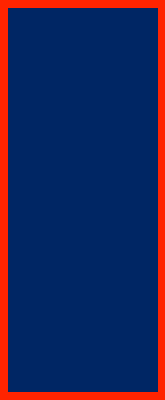
- Branch color: Dark Blue and Scarlet piping

Commanders
- Adjutant General of the U.S. Army: Brigadier General Adam D. Smith
- Chief of the AG Corps: COL Chesley D. Thigpen
- U.S Army Deputy Chief of Staff, G-1: Lieutenant General Brian S. Eifler

The Adjutant General's Corps, formerly the Adjutant General's Department, is a branch of the United States Army first established in 1775. This branch provides personnel service support by manning the force, providing human resources services, coordinating personnel support, Army band operations, and recruiting and retention. The objective of the Adjutant General Corps is to "maximize operational effectiveness of the total force by anticipating, manning, and sustaining military operations. HR support operations accomplish this by building, generating, and sustaining the force providing combatant commanders the required forces for missions and supporting leaders and Soldiers at all levels."

== History ==
The Adjutant General's Corps dates back to the formation of the U.S. Army. Horatio Gates, a former British Army officer, is recognized as the father of the Adjutant General's Corps. On 16 June 1775, the Continental Congress appointed him as the first Adjutant General to George Washington with the commission of a brigadier general. Historically, he was the second officer to receive a commission in the Continental Army, preceded only by George Washington. With that appointment, the second oldest existing branch of the Army was born.

General Gates' primary duty was to serve as key advisor and principal assistant to General Washington. Through his skill and ability, he organized the state militias into what became the Continental Army. Horatio Gates proved himself an able assistant as well as a competent field commander. Under his leadership, the Continental Army won the Battle of Saratoga – considered by many to be the turning point of the Revolutionary War. Following this important victory over the British, the Continental Congress awarded what was then our nation's highest honor, the congressional gold medal. The use of the Horatio Gates bronze and gold medals, which recognize superior achievement and service to the Regiment, dates from this important event.

Adjutant General Corps officers served in the War of 1812. Two men in particular who served as the Adjutant General during this period rose to prominence. General Alexander Macomb gained fame from his victory at the Battle of Plattsburgh, and later becoming the Commanding General of the Army. The other, Brigadier General Zebulon Pike, known for his explorations, died in battle while leading the attack on York, Canada.

With the appointment of Brevet Brigadier General Roger Jones in 1825, the office grew in importance. During his tenure, General Jones molded the office of the Adjutant General into the central bureau of the War Department. Adjutants General became the only officers invested with the authority to speak and sign official correspondence "for the commander".

Recognizing this, the Army almost exclusively appointed West Point graduates to be Adjutants General from 1839 through the early 1900s. The first two graduates so appointed, Samuel Cooper and Lorenzo Thomas, served with distinction as Adjutants General during the Civil War. Cooper served the Confederacy, while Thomas served the Union.

In 1861, two assistant Adjutants General, Major McDowell and Captain Franklin, drew up the plans to organize the more than 500,000 men who volunteered to fight for the Union. Their efforts, and others like them on both sides, built the massive armies of our Civil War years.

Following the Civil War, Brigadier General Edward D. Townsend took on the mission of compiling all the records of the war, both North and South. The Adjutant General's Department's "War of the Rebellion: Official Records" became an invaluable contribution to American military history. The department also discharged more than 800,000 men and enlisted 36,000 new recruits for the post Civil War Regular Army.

On 14 December 1872, the Adjutant General's Department adopted the old topographic engineer shield as its own branch insignia. The shield symbolized the Adjutant General's role of speaking "for the commander". Thirteen embossed stars replaced the "T.E." on the upper shield, creating the crest worn by all Adjutant General's Corps officers of today.

By the onset of the Spanish–American War in 1898, the Adjutant General's Office had evolved as the central coordinating bureau in the Army (continuing the legacy it developed during the Civil War). Major General William Harding Carter, under the direction of visionary Secretary of War Elihu Root, continued modernization efforts by implementing the general staff concept based upon European models. The Adjutant General's Department and the newly organized general staff evolved over the years as some functions were transferred and others modified. Several functions, formally part of the Adjutant General's Office, now evolved into independent staff agencies after World War I. The Inspector General, the Provost Marshal, the Assistant Chief for Intelligence, and the Chief of Military History all owe their beginnings to The Adjutant's General Office.

During World War II, more than 15,000 officers, soldiers, and civilians served in the Office of the Adjutant General. By the end of the war, the Adjutant General's Corps processed more than six million soldiers back into civilian life. In what has been described as one of the most successful administrative tasks ever carried out, the AG Corps processed nearly one-half million discharges a month in accomplishing this difficult mission.

Since World War II, the Adjutant General's Corps has been combat tested on several far-flung battlefields such as Korea, Vietnam, Grenada, Panama, and, most recently, in the Persian Gulf War (Operations Desert Shield and Desert Storm). AG soldiers mobilized 139,207 reserve component soldiers (equating to 1,045 Reserve and National Guard units of all types), recalled 1,386 retirees to active duty, deployed 1,600 Army civilians to Southwest Asia, processed over 10,000 individual and unit replacements, and delivered more than 27,000 tons of mail to deployed Army forces.

=== Personnel Services Delivery Redesign ===
The onset of the Global War on Terror shifted the paradigm to smaller scale engagements using asymmetric means and methods to attrite our forces, and our will, over longer duration conflicts. These new threats and perceived changes in the character of war drove the shift to “modularity” and to brigade combat teams (BCTs) vice Divisions as the combined arms building blocks. Before 2006, Human Resources (HR) operations was conducted primarily by Personnel Detachments, Personnel Service Battalions (PSBs) and Personnel Groups under Personnel Commands (PERSCOMs) that coordinated with G1s at echelon. Replacement Battalions and Companies provided critical replacement management and oversight, as well as care and feeding, to individual replacements in addition to operating CONUS replacement centers if/when mobilized. Human Resources support to Divisional maneuver brigades was achieved through habitual relationships with supporting Personnel Service Battalions and subordinate detachments.

Execution of the modular force concept divested the division structure of its organic or assigned functional battalions and the corps of its separate brigades. The Army used these reductions as the bill payers to increase the organic capability of modular brigades. The Army HR community's response to this transformation was Personnel Services Delivery Redesign. Personnel Detachments, Personnel Service Battalions, Personnel Groups, Personnel Commands, and Replacement Battalions/Companies were deactivated as HR structure focused on empowering brigade and battalion commanders with robust S1 sections possessing organic assets and systems. Remaining HR force structure (SRC 12) was designed to be modular and operate within broader sustainment operations. The new HR force consisted of the Human Resources Sustainment Center at the Theater Sustainment Command; Human Resources Operations Branches within the Expeditionary Sustainment Command and Sustainment Brigade; Human Resources Company providing mission command for multifunction HR and Postal platoons; Theater Gateway Personnel Accountability Team at the APOD/SPOD; and Military Mail Terminal at the APOD/SPOD. These units plans, integrated, and executed HR services primarily needed only when deployed: casualty liaison, personnel accountability, and postal support.

The AG Corps has been impacted by several rounds of reductions in personnel authorizations over time with each corresponding reduction in overall force size. However, the economies of scale, promised consolidated efficiencies, and technical expert support from higher echelons have not kept pace to meet the sustained demand. Since FY2005 the AG Corp has experienced 4x reduction in personnel/structure compared to the Army overall. In 2005 there was 1 AG Corp soldier per 26 Soldiers and as of FY2022 that was down to 1 to 36 Soldiers.

=== Integrated Personnel and Pay System ‐ Army ===
By the 2010s the Army's myriad legacy personnel systems posed enterprise-level and operational challenges. Many of these systems relied on outdated technology and were stove-piped (could not share data) with many specific to only one of the Army's 3 components (Active Duty, National Guard, Reserve). As of late 2022, the IPPS-A system is a total force system for 1.1 million Soldiers providing streamlined personnel and pay services. It will "improve access, timeliness and will provide auditability of personnel and pay information for the Total Army – integrating more than 30 current systems; eliminating more than 300 interfaces; ensuring secure, consistent processes and data; and meeting required standards."

== Branch insignia ==
A silver metal and enamel shield 1 inch in height on which are thirteen vertical stripes, 7 silver and 6 red; on a blue chief 1 large and 12 small silver stars. The basic design—the shield from the coat of arms of the United States—was adopted in 1872 as a solid shield of silver, bearing thirteen stars. In 1924, this design was authorized to be made in gold metal with the colors red, white, and blue in enamel. In December 1964, the insignia was changed to silver base metal with silver stars and silver and red enamel stripes. Branch Plaque The plaque design has the branch insignia in proper colors on a white background and the branch designation in silver letters. The rim is gold.

- Regimental insignia

A silver color metal and enamel device 1 1/8 inches in height consisting of a shield blazoned: Azure (dark blue) within a border Gules, an inescutcheon paly of thirteen Argent and Gules, on a chief Azure a mullet Argent between a pattern of twelve of the like (as on The Adjutant General's insignia of branch), and enclosed in base by two laurel branches Or. Attached above the shield a silver scroll inscribed with the numerals "1775" in red and attached below the shield a silver triparted scroll inscribed "DEFEND AND SERVE" in dark blue. The Regimental Insignia was approved on 23 December 1986.

- Regimental coat of arms

The coat of arms appears on the breast of a displayed eagle on the regimental flag. The coat of arms is: Azure (dark blue) within a bordure per bordure Argent and Gules, an inescutcheon paly of thirteen Argent and Gules; on a chief Azure a mullet Argent between a pattern of twelve of the like (as on The Adjutant General's Corps insignia of branch), all within a bordure Argent and enclosed in base by two laurel leaves Or. Displayed above the eagle's head is the crest (On a wreath of the colors Argent and Azure the numerals "1775" Gules.)

- Symbolism of regimental insignia

Dark blue and scarlet are branch colors of The Adjutant General's Corps. The inner white border signifies unity and the good conscience of those who have done their duty. The inner red, white and blue shield is the insignia of The Adjutant General's Corps and the gold laurel wreath around its base stands for excellence in accomplishing the mission. The "1775" in the crest is the year The Adjutant General's Corps was created. The color red symbolizes valor and the blood shed in our war for independence.

- Branch colors

Dark blue piped with Scarlet. Dark Blue - 65012 cloth; 67126 yarn; PMS 539. Scarlet - 65006 cloth; 67111 yarn; PMS 200.

The pompons on the Adjutant Generals' caps were topped with white in 1851. The facings were listed in the specification for the Adjutant General's uniform in September 1915 as dark blue. In Circular number 70 dated 28 October 1936, the Adjutant General's Corps and the National Guard Bureau exchanged colors and the present colors were established for the Adjutant General's Corps. The blue used in the branch insignia is ultramarine blue rather than the branch color.

- Birthday

16 June 1775. The post of Adjutant General was established 16 June 1775, and has been continuously in operation since that time. The Adjutant General's Department, by that name, was established by the act of 3 March 1813 and was redesignated The Adjutant General's Corps in 1950.

== Core Competencies ==
=== Provide Human Resources Support ===
- Man the Force
  - Personnel Accountability / Strength Reporting
  - HR Support to Replacement Operations
  - HR Support to Casualty Operations
  - Personnel Readiness Management
- Provide HR Services
  - Essential Personnel Services (EPS)
  - Postal Operations
  - Army Band Operations
  - Morale, Welfare, and Recreation

Coordinate Personnel Support

- Command Interest Programs
- Retention Operations

Personnel Information Management

== Military Occupational Specialties ==
Enlisted	Warrant Officer	Commissioned Officer
Human Resources Specialist (42A); Musician (42R); Special Band Musician (42S); Career Counselor (79S); Recruiter (79R); Recruiter ARNG (79T); Talent Acquisition Specialist (42T)	Human Resources Technician (420A); Bandmaster (420C); Talent Acquisition Technician (420T)	Human Resources Officer (42B); Band Officer (42C); Senior Human Resources Officer (42H)

== Organization ==
The United States Army Adjutant General School is currently at Fort Jackson.

=== Deputy Chief of Staff G-1 Personnel of The United States Army ===
As the principal human resources office of the U.S. Army, the G1 is responsible for development, management and execution of all manpower and personnel plans, programs and policies throughout the entire U.S. Army.

==== Human Resources Command ====
The United States Army Human Resources Command (Army HRC or simply HRC) is a command of the United States Army established in 2003 from the merger of the United States Total Army Personnel Command (PERSCOM) in Alexandria, Virginia and the United States Army Reserve Personnel Command (AR-PERSCOM) in St. Louis, Missouri. HRC is a direct reporting unit supervised by the Office of the Deputy Chief of Staff for Personnel (DCS), G-1, focused on improving the career management potential of Army Soldiers by having a single agency manage Soldier schooling, promotions, awards, records, transfers, appointments, benefits, and retirement.

==== G1/AG and S1 Operations ====
Internal human resources functions at the Battalion/Brigade/Division/Corps levels are handled by the S/G/J1 staff section whose purpose is to plan, provide, and coordinate the delivery of HR support, services, or information to all assigned and attached personnel. The Officer in Charge is the principal staff advisor to the Commander for all matters concerning personnel services.

=== Theater HR Force Structure (SRC 12) ===
Theater HR is focused on providing external personnel services to units and personnel in an area of operations and is part of the sustainment enterprise.

==== Human Resources Sustainment Center ====
The Human Resources Sustainment Center is a multi-functional element assigned to a Theater Sustainment Command that plans, integrates, and sustains personnel accountability, postal, and personnel systems integration for a theater of operations. It establishes and ensures functionality of the theater personnel database and the Postal Directory Address Database, and provides theater-wide assistance for HR systems issues. It is responsible for synchronizing replacement priorities within the sustainment enterprise and supports effective support relationships at echelon. It integrates and provides guidance and technical support for HR units executing personnel accountability and postal functions throughout the theater and monitors the execution of the theater gateway (TGPAT) and military mail terminal (MMT) missions. The HRSC will be reorganized into Theater Personnel Operations Center force design in 2024.

Unit	Component	Insignia	Command	Location
1st Theater Personnel Operations Center	Active		21st Theater Sustainment Command	Kaiserslautern (Germany)
8th Theater Personnel Operations Center	Active		8th Theater Sustainment Command	Fort Shafter (HI)
14th Theater Personnel Operations Center	Active		1st Theater Sustainment Command	Fort Knox (KY)
3rd Theater Personnel Operations Center	Reserve		79th Theater Sustainment Command	Jackson (MS)
310th Theater Personnel Operations Center	Reserve		377th Theater Sustainment Command	Fort Jackson (SC)

==== Human Resources Operations Center (HROC) ====
The Human Resources Operations Center is assigned to an Army Service Component Command, Corps, or Division and provides critical HR strength management capacity, technical expertise, analysis, assessment, training and assistance, as well as casualty, replacement, and postal planning capabilities. HROC's are currently only assigned to the Active Component. ASCC HROC's establish the Theater Casualty Information Center.

Unit	Component	Insignia	Command	Location
2nd HROC	Active		2nd Infantry Division	Camp Humphreys (South Korea)
4th HROC	Active		4th Infantry Division	Fort Carson (CO)
5th HROC	Active		1st Armored Division	Fort Bliss (TX)
6th HROC	Active		1st Infantry Division	Fort Riley (KS)
7th HROC	Active		3rd Infantry Division	Fort Stewart (GA)
10th HROC	Active		10th Mountain Division	Fort Drum (NY)
11th HROC	Active		101st Airborne Division	Fort Campbell (KY)
13th HROC	Active		III Armored Corps	Fort Hood (TX)
18th HROC	Active		XVIII Airborne Corps	Fort Bragg (NC)
21st HROC	Active		25th Infantry Division	Schofield Barracks (HI)
23rd HROC	Active		1st Cavalry Division	Fort Hood (TX)
31st HROC	Active		I Corps	Joint Base Lewis-McChord (WA)
118th HROC	Active		82nd Airborne Division	Fort Bragg (NC)

==== Human Resources Operations Branch (HROB) ====
The Human Resources Operations Branch is an organic branch of the Support Operations section in Sustainment brigades and Division Sustainment Brigades, and Distribution management Center in Expeditionary Sustainment Commands. The branch is the primary planning element for external HR support at echelon. It is responsible for planning, coordinating, integrating, and synchronizing personnel accountability, casualty, and postal operations missions within the area of operations.

==== Military Mail Terminal (MMT) ====
Military Mail Terminal team coordinates, receives, and processes mail for a theater of operations. It is a technical element attached to the Human Resources Company responsible for the MMT mission.

Unit	Component	Insignia	Command	Location
81st Military Mail Terminal	Active		1st Cavalry Division	Fort Hood (TX)
112th Military Mail Terminal	Active		593rd Corps Sustainment Command	Joint Base Lewis–McChord (WA)
125th Military Mail Terminal	Active		82nd Airborne Division	Fort Bragg (NC)
316th Military Mail Terminal	Reserve		377th Theater Sustainment Command	Fort Totten (NY)
806th Military Mail Terminal	Reserve		79th Theater Sustainment Command	March Air Reserve Base (CA)

==== Theater Gateway - Personnel Accountability Team (TG PAT) ====
Theater Gateway - Personnel Accountability Team coordinates and provides personnel accountability operations and database inputs as personnel enter, transit, and depart a theater of operations. It is a technical element attached to the Human Resources Company responsible for the Theater Gateway.

Unit	Component	Insignia	Command	Location
9th TGPAT	Active		101st Airborne Division	Fort Campbell (KY)
52nd TGPAT	Active		10th Mountain Division	Fort Drum (NY)
49th TGPAT	National Guard			Fort Richardson (AK)
138th TGPAT	National Guard		38th Infantry Division	Indianapolis (IN)
633rd TGPAT	National Guard			Chicago (IL)
814th TGPAT	Reserve		377th Theater Sustainment Command	Starkville (MS)
864th TGPAT	Reserve		377th Theater Sustainment Command	Coraopolis (PA)

==== Personnel Company (Human Resources) ====
The Human Resources Company (HR CO) provides mission command and operational planning, logistics, communications, and technical guidance to assigned platoons and teams. There are two variant's: Division Sustainment Brigade (DSB) Human Resources Company and non-divisional Human Resources Company. The DSB HR CO provides baseline HR support to their assigned division with an emphasis on personnel accountability and casualty liaison operations. Non-divisional HR CO's are modular task organized as needed to perform personnel accountability, casualty liaison, and/or postal operations to an assigned area or supported unit. Military Mail Terminal or Theater-Gateway Personnel Accountability Teams may be assigned or attached when the HR CO performs those missions.

===== Platoons =====
- Human Resources Platoons are multi-functional and may perform both personnel accountability and causality liaison missions by establishing personnel accountability teams or causality liaison teams.
- Postal platoons perform postal operations either as part of a military mail terminal or to an assigned area.

Division Sustainment Brigade HR Companies

Unit	Component	Insignia	Command	Location	Organic Platoons
18th HR CO	Active		82nd Airborne Division	Fort Bragg, North Carolina	2x HR, 1x Postal
19th HR CO	Active		2nd Infantry Division	Korea	2x HR, 1x Postal
22nd HR CO	Active		4th Infantry Division	Fort Carson, Colorado	2x HR, 1x Postal
90th HR CO	Active		3rd Infantry Division	Fort Stewart, Georgia	2x HR, 1x Postal
101st HR CO	Active		101st Airborne Division	Fort Campbell, Kentucky	2x HR, 1x Postal
178th HR CO	Active		1st Armored Division	Fort Bliss, Texas	2x HR, 1x Postal
258th HR CO	Active		1st Infantry Division	Fort Riley, Kansas	2x HR, 1x Postal
259th HR CO	Active		25th Infantry Division	Schofield Barracks, Hawaii	2x HR, 1x Postal
502nd HR CO	Active		1st Cavalry Division	Fort Cavazos, Texas	1x HR, 2x Postal
510th HR CO	Active		10th Mountain Division	Fort Drum, New York	2x HR, 1x Postal

Echelon-Above-Division (EAD) (Modular) HR Companies

Unit	Component	Insignia	Command	Location	Organic Platoons
569th HR CO	Active		16th Sustainment Brigade	Germany	2x HR, 1x Postal
49th HR CO	National Guard			Sacramento ()	2x HR
105th HR CO	National Guard			Nashville (TN)	3x HR
147th HR CO	National Guard			Arden Hills (MN)	3x HR
149th HR CO	National Guard			Austin (TX)	2x HR
213th HR CO	National Guard			Fort Indiantown Gap (PA)	3x HR
63rd HR CO	Reserve		311th Expeditionary Sustainment Command	March Air Reserve Base (CA)	2x HR, 1x Postal
77th HR CO	Reserve		316th Expeditionary Sustainment Command	Amherst (NY)	5x Postal
194th HR CO	Reserve		4th Expeditionary Sustainment Command	Bossier City (LA)	2x Postal, 1x HR
271st HR CO	Reserve		1st Mission Support Command	Fort Buchanan (PR)	4x Postal, 1x HR
312th HR CO	Reserve		311th Expeditionary Sustainment Command	San Diego (CA)	3x Postal
328th HR CO	Reserve		4th Expeditionary Sustainment Command	San Antonio (TX)	2x Postal, 1x HR
350th HR CO	Reserve		4th Expeditionary Sustainment Command	Grand Prairie (TX)	2x HR, 2x Postal
376th HR CO	Reserve		311th Expeditionary Sustainment Command	Bell (CA)	3x Postal, 1x HR
387th HR CO	Reserve		451st Expeditionary Sustainment Command	Wichita (KS)	4x Postal, 2x HR
408th HR CO	Reserve		316th Expeditionary Sustainment Command	Fort Totten (NY)	3x Postal
442nd HR CO	Reserve		143rd Expeditionary Sustainment Command	Tallahassee (FL)	4x Postal
444th HR CO	Reserve		316th Expeditionary Sustainment Command	Pittsburgh (PA)	3x Postal
461st HR CO	Reserve		143rd Expeditionary Sustainment Command	Decatur (GA)	3x HR, 2x Postal
478th HR CO	Reserve		364th Expeditionary Sustainment Command	Fort Douglas (UT)	4x Postal
492nd HR CO	Reserve		316th Expeditionary Sustainment Command	Bristol (PA)	4x Postal
650th HR CO	Reserve		364th Expeditionary Sustainment Command	Fort Harrison (MT)	3x Postal
678th HR Co	Reserve		310th Expeditionary Sustainment Command	Nashville (TN)	4x Postal
801st HR CO	Reserve		4th Expeditionary Sustainment Command	Tulsa (OK)	2x HR, 2x Postal
809th HR CO	Reserve		143rd Expeditionary Sustainment Command	Mobile (AL)	2x Postal, 3x HR
812th HR CO	Reserve		310th Expeditionary Sustainment Command	Charlotte (NC)	4x Postal
847th HR CO	Reserve		103rd Expeditionary Sustainment Command	Fort Snelling (MN)	4x Postal, 1x HR
909th HR CO	Reserve		364th Expeditionary Sustainment Command	Bothell (WA)	6x Postal
912th HR CO	Reserve		143rd Expeditionary Sustainment Command	Orlando (FL)	4x Postal

=== Deactivated Unit Structure ===
Prior to Personnel Services Delivery Redesign the Adjutant General Corps force structure included:

- Conus Replacement Center / Replacement Battalion / Replacement Company - provided processing and life support for personnel designated for deployment to overseas operations.
- Personnel Service Battalion - provided command and control over personnel detachments to provide essential personnel services and a (pre-PSDR) postal company.

== Publications ==
The Adjutant General Corps is the proponent for the following Army publications:

FM 1-0 Human Resources Support

ATP 1-0.1 G1/AG and S1 Operations

ATP 1-0.2 Theater Human Resources Support

== See also ==
- United States Army Adjutant General School
- United States Army branch insignia
- List of Adjutant Generals of the U.S. Army
