= Luis R. Visot =

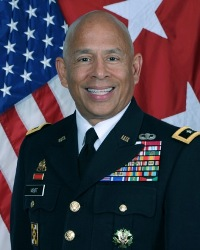
- Born: Ponce, Puerto Rico
- Military career
- Allegiance: United States
- Branch: United States Army; Army Reserve
- Service years: 1978-2016
- Rank: Major General
- Units: Chief of Staff, United States Army Reserve
- Commands: 377th Theater Sustainment Command; 4th Sustainment Command (Expeditionary); 1st Sustainment Command (Theater); 6th Transportation Battalion
- Conflicts: Gulf War; Iraq War

Luis Raul Visot Sauza is an American educational administrator and former Army commander who was a major general and Chief of Staff of the United States Army Reserve.

== Early years ==
Visot was born in Ponce, Puerto Rico, the son of Luis Raul Visot and Lolita Sauza. He attended Marquette University, graduating with a bachelor's degree in Spanish, and earned a master's degree in higher education from the University of Georgia in 1980 and a doctorate in education from the George Washington University in 2020.

== Dissertation Study ==
Visot successfully defended his dissertation, Value Congruence and the Acculturation Experience of Puerto Rican Female Citizen Soldiers: A Narrative Inquiry on January 24, 2020. This narrative inquiry aimed at understanding how Puerto Rican female citizen-soldiers explain the value congruence between personal/Puerto Rican values (as Puerto Rican citizens) and organizational values (as U.S. Army soldiers) during their lived acculturation experience.

The resulting co-composed narratives of his 10 Puerto Rican female citizen-soldiers led to four “resonant threads:” identity and being (meaning); personal determination, strength, and courage (I can do this!) – opportunities and challenges; selflessness and the desire to serve and help others and make a difference; and impact of language (English language proficiency and Puerto Rican accent) on the participant's acculturation experience.

Five central findings that provided “clues” to the research puzzle were uncovered: values (personal, Puerto Rican, and U.S. Army) play a meaningful and significant role in the Puerto Rican female Citizen-Soldiers’ lived acculturation experience from the Puerto Rican culture (heritage culture) to the U.S. Army culture (host culture); consonance is the predominant value congruence explanation offered by the Puerto Rican female Citizen-Soldiers during their lived acculturation experiences; integration is the primary acculturation strategy employed by the Puerto Rican female Citizen-Soldiers as they acculturate from the Puerto Rican culture (heritage culture) to the US Army culture (host culture); the Puerto Rican accent and the English language proficiency play a noteworthy dynamic in the Puerto Rican female Citizen-Soldiers’ lived acculturation experience; and Puerto Rican female citizen-soldiers’ reasons for joining, staying, and leaving the U.S. Army are varied, diverse, and progressive.

Additionally, Visot concluded that (1) Based upon the Puerto Rican female citizen-soldiers’ understanding of machismo and marianismo and their ability to see no barriers when given the chance to be treated as a capable and skillful Soldier to achieve their potential, they have been able to adapt to their acculturation experience from the Puerto Rican culture to the U.S. Army culture, both male-dominant cultures. (2) The Puerto Rican female citizen-soldiers’ acculturation experiences into the U.S. Army and value congruence experiences are evolutionary processes, meaning they transition from separation to assimilation to integration and back to separation acculturation strategies, and the value congruence process transitions from value contention to value consonance. and (3) The U.S. Army is not intentional in implementing acculturation strategies for all groups and individuals from a non-dominant culture who join the U.S. Army and is not intentional in understanding the value congruence between an individual's personal/national values and the U.S. Army's organizational values.

== Career ==
Visot was commissioned as 2LT in 1978. He holds a Bachelor of Arts degree in Spanish from Marquette University in Milwaukee, Wisconsin, a master's degree in Education from the University of Georgia in Athens, Georgia, an additional master's degree in Strategic Studies from the United States Army War College, and a doctorate in education in Human and Organizational Learning from the George Washington University.

Visot had a long career in Student Affairs at the University of South Florida (USF) include: Student Housing and Residence Life, Student Union (operations, administration, student organizations and student programming), Latin American and Caribbean Studies, Alumni Affairs, Development, and University Advancement. Luis finished his professional Higher Education experience as the Executive Director, Joint Military Leadership Center at USF.

He has held general officer command positions with the United States Army Forces Command, the 377th Theater Sustainment Command, the 4th Sustainment Command (Expeditionary) and the 1st Sustainment Command (Theater). Other commands Visot has held include that of the 6th Transportation Battalion. In addition, he has been deployed to serve in the Gulf War, the Iraq War and Operation Unified Response, as well as with the Implementation Force.

== Commands ==
Visot has held various commands and staff positions within the US military. On May 16, 2009, Visot assumed command of the 377th Theater Sustainment Command, New Orleans, Louisiana, Commanding General, 4th Sustainment Command (Expeditionary), San Antonio, TX, Deputy Commander, 1st Theater Sustainment Command, Fort Bragg, NC and deployed in support of Operation Iraqi Freedom (2007-2008). He has served as Commander, 3rd Transportation Command Element in Anniston, AL; Chief of Staff for the 143rd Transportation Command (TRANSCOM) in Orlando, FL; and Commander, 32nd Transportation Group (Composite) in Tampa, FL. As Commander, 32nd Transportation Group (Composite), he deployed his unit in support of Operation Iraqi Freedom to Kuwait and Iraq in 2003–2004. Previous assignments include Commander, 6th Transportation Battalion (Truck) at Fort Eustis, VA under the 7th Transportation Group (Composite), as part of the Battalion Command Exchange/Integration Program; Commander, 3-347th Regiment, 2nd Brigade, 87th Division (Training Support); and Commander, 146th Transportation Detachment (Air Terminal Movement Control Team) in Orlando, FL. As Commander, 146th Transportation Detachment (Air Terminal Movement Control Team), Visot deployed his unit in support of Operation Joint Endeavor to Taszar, Hungary and Tuzla, Bosnia-Herzegovina. During Desert Shield/Desert Storm (1990-1991), he also served as the 32nd Transportation Group Liaison Officer to 22nd Support Command in the Logistical Operations Center and as a Logistical Planning and Analysis Cell Analyst, 22nd Support Command, in Dhahran, Saudi Arabia. Visot retired from the United States Army Reserve in 2016.

== Awards and badges ==
=== Military awards ===
Parachutist badge
Army Staff Identification Badge
143rd Sustainment Command (Expeditionary) Combat Service Identification Badge

Army Distinguished Service Medal
Legion of Merit
Bronze Star Medal with 1 bronze Oak Leaf Cluster
Defense Meritorious Service Medal
Meritorious Service Medal
Army Commendation Medal with two bronze oak leaf clusters
Army Achievement Medal with two bronze oak leaf clusters
Army Reserve Components Achievement Medal with silver oak leaf cluster
Meritorious Unit Commendation
Army Superior Unit Award
National Defense Service Medal
Armed Forces Expeditionary Medal
Southwest Asia Service Medal with three bronze Service stars
Global War on Terrorism Expeditionary Medal
Global War on Terrorism Service Medal
Armed Forces Service Medal
Armed Forces Reserve Medal with Gold Hourglass
Army Service Ribbon
Army Reserve Components Overseas Training Ribbon with award numeral 4
NATO Medal
Kuwait Liberation Medal (Saudi Arabia)
Kuwait Liberation Medal (Kuwait)
