= 377th Theater Sustainment Command =

Sustainment command within the U.S. Army Reserve Command

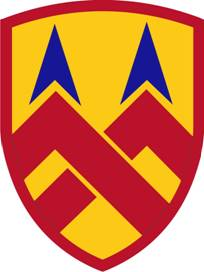
- 377th Theater Sustainment Command Shoulder Sleeve Insignia
- Active: 1942–1946; 1948–present
- Country: United States
- Allegiance: United States Army Western Hemisphere Command
- Branch: United States Army Reserve
- Type: Sustainment
- Role: Theater Sustainment Command
- Part of: United States Army Reserve Command
- Garrison/HQ: Naval Air Station Joint Reserve Base New Orleans, Louisiana
- Nickname: 377th TSC
- Mottos: "Can Do, Anytime, Anywhere!"
- Engagements: Global War on Terrorism; War in Afghanistan; Iraq War
- Decorations: Meritorious Unit Commendation; Superior Unit Award

Commanders
- Commander: MG Justin M. Swanson
- Command Sergeant Major: CSM Juddiah G. Mooso

Insignia
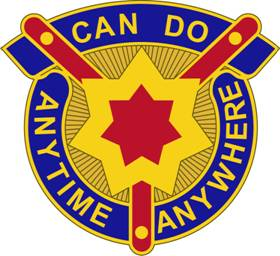
- Distinctive Unit Insignia

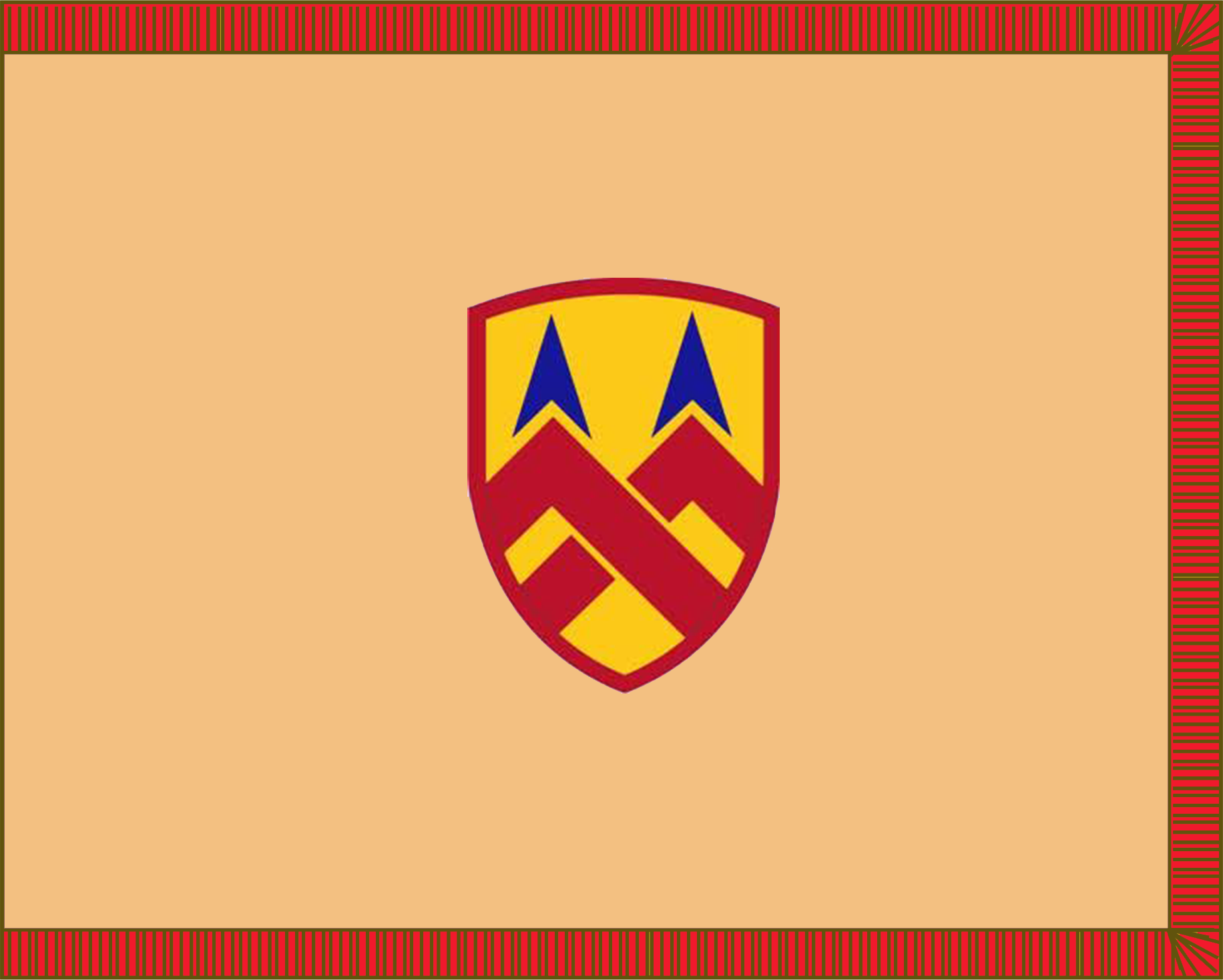
- 377th Sustainment Command Flag

The 12th Port of Embarkation, later designated 377th Theater Sustainment Command (377 TSC), was constituted on 2 July 1942 and was activated 5 July 1942 at Fort Dix, New Jersey. The unit was converted, reorganized, and redesignated 7 November 1942 as the 12th Port. The unit was inactivated 4 January 1946 at Camp Kilmer, New Jersey and later redesignated 3 November 1948 in New Orleans, Louisiana, as the 377th Transportation Major Port. On 11 September 1950 the 377th was called to Camp Kilmer, New Jersey. Later, the unit moved to Fort Eustis, Virginia and stayed on active Federal Service until 10 October 1952. From 1953 until 1963, the 377th remained in a Reserve status and experienced several changes in unit designation.

On 31 December 1965, the unit was re-designated as the 377th Support Brigade under the Army Logistical Concept. On 16 October 1979, it was renamed the 377th Corps Support Command. It retained the designation until 16 July 1981 when it was designated as a Theater Army Area Command (TAACOM). On 1 October 1998 the TAACOM wartime mission expanded and the unit designation was changed to the 377th Theater Support Command.

The TSC serves as a Force Support Package unit with an ongoing support mission in its area of operation. Over 500 downtrace units throughout the United States, Puerto Rico, Guam and the Virgin Islands provide support to the TSC for training and wartime mission guidance. Whether at home station, deployed across the country or overseas, the TSC trains to achieve its peacetime and wartime mission of providing command and control of assigned units to ensure and maintain a high state of readiness. The TSC prepares wartime-aligned units to accomplish their mission by developing, executing and evaluating training. The TSC provides daily logistics support to its wartime higher headquarters for missions and exercises.

== Organization ==
The 377th Theater Sustainment Command is a subordinate functional command of the United States Army Reserve Command. As of January 2026, the command consists of the following units:

- 377th Theater Sustainment Command, in Belle Chasse (LA)
  - Headquarters and Headquarters Company, 377th Theater Sustainment Command, in Belle Chasse (LA)
  - 310th Theater Personnel Operations Center, at Fort Jackson (SC)
  - 377th Theater Sustainment Command Mission Support Element, in New Orleans (LA)
  - 419th Contracting Support Brigade — Army Reserve Element, at Fort Bragg (NC)
  - 469th Financial Management Support Center, in New Orleans (LA)
  - 4th Expeditionary Sustainment Command, at Joint Base San Antonio (TX)
    - 77th Quartermaster Group (Petroleum Support), at Fort Bliss (TX)
      - 372nd Quartermaster Battalion (Petroleum Support), at Kirtland Air Force Base (NM)
      - 383rd Quartermaster Battalion (Petroleum Support), at Fort Bliss (TX)
    - 90th Sustainment Brigade, at Camp Robinson (AR)
      - 90th Special Troops Battalion, at Camp Robinson (AR)
      - 316th Quartermaster Battalion (Petroleum Support), in Okmulgee (OK)
      - 348th Transportation Battalion (Terminal), in Houston (TX)
    - 211th Regional Support Group, in Corpus Christi (TX)
      - 319th Combat Sustainment Support Battalion, in Harlingen (TX)
      - 373rd Combat Sustainment Support Battalion, in Beaumont (TX)
    - 300th Sustainment Brigade, in Grand Prairie (TX)
      - 300th Special Troops Battalion, in Grand Prairie (TX)
      - 363rd Quartermaster Battalion (Petroleum Support), in San Marcos (TX)
  - 143rd Expeditionary Sustainment Command, in Orlando (FL)
    - 207th Regional Support Group, at Fort Jackson (SC)
      - 362nd Quartermaster Battalion (Petroleum Support), in Winterville (NC)
      - 812th Transportation Battalion (Motor), in Charlotte (NC)
    - 518th Sustainment Brigade, in Knightdale (NC)
      - 518th Special Troops Battalion, in Knightdale (NC)
      - 275th Combat Sustainment Support Battalion, at Fort Lee (VA)
      - 352nd Combat Sustainment Support Battalion, in Macon (GA)
    - 641st Regional Support Group, in St. Petersburg (FL)
      - 257th Transportation Battalion (Movement Control), in Gainesville (FL)
      - 332nd Transportation Battalion (Terminal), in Tampa (FL)
    - 642nd Regional Support Group, in Decatur (GA)
      - 787th Combat Sustainment Support Battalion, in Dothan (AL)
      - 828th Transportation Battalion (Motor), in Livingston (AL)
  - 310th Expeditionary Sustainment Command, in Indianapolis (IN)
    - 38th Regional Support Group, in Cross Lanes (WV)
      - 373rd Quartermaster Battalion (Petroleum Support), in Jeffersonville (IN)
      - 380th Quartermaster Battalion (Petroleum Support), in Evansville (IN)
    - 55th Sustainment Brigade, at Fort Belvoir (VA)
      - 55th Special Troops Battalion, at Fort Belvoir (VA)
      - 313th Transportation Battalion (Movement Control), in Baltimore (MD)
      - 398th Combat Sustainment Support Battalion, in Rockville (MD)
      - 497th Combat Sustainment Support Battalion, in Salem (VA)
    - 354th Quartermaster Group (Petroleum Support), in Whitehall (OH)
      - 319th Quartermaster Battalion (Petroleum Support), in Twinsburg (OH)
      - 633rd Quartermaster Battalion (Petroleum Support), in Sharonville (OH)
    - 643rd Regional Support Group, in Whitehall (OH)
      - 718th Transportation Battalion (Motor), in Columbus (OH)
      - 766th Transportation Battalion (Motor), in South Bend (IN)
  - 316th Expeditionary Sustainment Command, in Coraopolis (PA)
    - 3rd Transportation Brigade (Expeditionary), at Fort Belvoir (VA)
      - 359th Transportation Battalion (Terminal), at Joint Base Langley–Eustis (VA)
    - 77th Sustainment Brigade, at Joint Base McGuire-Dix-Lakehurst (NJ)
      - 77th Special Troops Battalion, at Joint Base McGuire-Dix-Lakehurst (NJ)
      - 354th Transportation Battalion (Movement Control), at Fort Totten (NY)
      - 389th Combat Sustainment Support Battalion, at Fort Totten (NY)
      - 436th Transportation Battalion (Movement Control), at Fort Wadsworth (NY)
      - 462nd Transportation Battalion (Movement Control), in Trenton (NJ)
    - 301st Regional Support Group, in Butler (PA)
      - 157th Combat Sustainment Support Battalion, at Biddle Air National Guard Base (PA)
      - 378th Combat Sustainment Support Battalion, at Fort Indiantown Gap (PA)
      - 413th Combat Sustainment Support Battalion, in Schenectady (NY)
    - 475th Quartermaster Group (Petroleum Support), in Farrell (PA)
      - 327th Quartermaster Battalion (Petroleum Support), in Williamsport (PA)
      - 402nd Quartermaster Battalion (Petroleum Support), in New Castle (PA)
    - 655th Regional Support Group, in Chicopee (MA)
      - 167th Combat Sustainment Support Battalion, in Londonderry (NH)
      - 334th Quartermaster Battalion (Petroleum Support), in West Hartford (CT)
      - 395th Combat Sustainment Support Battalion, in Middletown (CT)
      - 719th Transportation Battalion (Movement Control), in Brockton (MA)
  - Army Reserve Sustainment Command, in Birmingham (AL)
    - Army Materiel Command — Army Reserve Element (AMC-ARE), at Redstone Arsenal (AL)
    - Army Sustainment Command — Army Reserve Element (ASC-ARE), at Rock Island Arsenal (IL)
      - Logistics Civil Augmentation Program (LOGCAP) Support Brigade, at Rock Island Arsenal (IL)
        - 1st LOGCAP Support Battalion, at Fort Belvoir (VA)
        - 2nd LOGCAP Support Battalion, at Rock Island Arsenal (IL)
        - 3rd LOGCAP Support Battalion, in Birmingham (AL)
        - 4th LOGCAP Support Battalion, in Athens (GA)
        - 5th LOGCAP Support Battalion, in Sheffield (AL)
    - Defense Contract Management Agency — Army Reserve Element (DCMA-ARE), at Fort Lee (VA)
      - 915th Contracting Battalion, in Baltimore (MD)
  - Deployment Support Command (US Army Reserve), in Birmingham (AL)
    - 757th Expeditionary Railway Center, in St. Louis (MO) and in Richmond (VA)
    - 1179th Transportation Surface Brigade, at Fort Hamilton (NY)
      - 1174th Deployment and Distribution Support Battalion, at Fort Totten (NY)
      - 1185th Deployment and Distribution Support Battalion, in Lancaster (PA)
      - 1398th Deployment and Distribution Support Battalion, in Baltimore (MD)
    - 1189th Transportation Surface Brigade, at Joint Base Charleston (SC)
      - 1173rd Deployment and Distribution Support Battalion, in Brockton (MA)
      - 1182nd Deployment and Distribution Support Battalion, at Joint Base Charleston (SC)
      - 1186th Deployment and Distribution Support Battalion, in Jacksonville (FL)
      - 1188th Deployment and Distribution Support Battalion, in Decatur (GA)
    - 1190th Transportation Surface Brigade, in Baton Rouge (LA)
      - 1181st Deployment and Distribution Support Battalion, in Meridian (MS)
      - 1184th Deployment and Distribution Support Battalion, in Mobile (AL)
      - 1192nd Deployment and Distribution Support Battalion, in New Orleans (LA)
    - 1394th Transportation Surface Brigade, at Camp Pendleton (CA)
      - 1395th Deployment and Distribution Support Battalion, at Joint Base Lewis–McChord (WA)
      - 1397th Deployment and Distribution Support Battalion, at Camp Pendleton (CA)

Abbreviations: PLS — Palletized Load System; HET — Heavy Equipment Transporter; POL — Petroleum Oil Lubricants; EAB — Echelon Above Brigade
