= 164th Quartermaster Group (United States) =

164th Quartermaste Group
- Active: 16 Sept 2006 - Present
- Country: United States of America
- Allegiance: United States
- Branch: United States Army
- Type: Non-Divisional
- Role: Petroleum & Water
- Part of: 4th Sustainment Command (Expeditionary)
- Motto: Fueling Warriors

The 164th Quartermaster Group is a Major Subordinate Command (MSC) of the 4th Sustainment Command (Expeditionary) (ESC) and one of only three of its kind in the United States Army Reserve. The unit manages a peacetime downtrace that has command and control of almost 600 Army Reservists located throughout Oklahoma and Texas, and its Soldiers support diverse missions that are logistical in nature. The units of the 164th Quartermaster Group have served in Operations Joint Forge in Bosnia, Joint Endeavor in Kosovo, Desert Storm in Iraq, Enduring Freedom in Afghanistan, and Iraqi Freedom in Iraq. Additionally, most of the subordinate units and over 90% of the Soldiers in the Group have mobilized and deployed in support of all ONE, OEF, OIF, Global War on Terrorism missions since 2002.

== Mission ==
The 164th Quartermaster Group mission is to plan, control and supervise the supply of bulk petroleum products and water to designated units in a designated area. It also coordinates theater petroleum and water distribution systems. Distributes bulk petroleum to US Army, Navy, Air Force, and other supported activities within theater. Provides command and control for two to five battalions (petroleum pipeline and terminal operating, petroleum supply, transportation, or water supply) and supervises other assigned or attached units.

== History ==
The 164th Quartermaster Group activated on September 16, 2006. Its structure came from the 172nd Corps Support Group which deactivated in September 2006 under the command of COL Christopher T. Serpa.

Since its activation, the 164th Quartermaster Group has participated in the Quartermaster Liquid Logistics Exercise (QLLEX) and has performed duty under that exercise at Fort Devens, MA and at Yakima Training Center, WA.

In May 2007 the 164th mobilized and deployed a detachment to Kuwait and Afghanistan in support of OIF. In November 2007 they deployed additional personnel to Kuwait to join the detachment already on ground.

In 2009 the 164th QM GRP deployed two more detachments to Iraq. The first deployed in February 2009 and the second in April 2009 resulting in deployment of more than 50 personnel.
