= Sustainment Command (Expeditionary) =

Type of unit in the United States Army

An expeditionary sustainment command (ESC), stylized "Sustainment Command (Expeditionary)", is a logistics headquarters in the United States Army. The concept of sustainment is as follows: the provision of logistics, financial management, personnel services, and health service support necessary to maintain operations until a mission is successfully completed.

== Organization ==
An expeditionary support command is organized with one or more sustainment brigades, transportation brigades, or movement control battalions (for theater opening, theater distribution, or theater closing operations). An ESC holds command and control over all assigned and attached units, as directed by the theater sustainment command.

In 2019, the Army had three active component and six reserve ESCs, which totaled nine in the Army. Each active ESC is located together with a corps. A brigadier general leads an expeditionary sustainment command.

An ESC is made up of 74 military occupational specialties (MOS) and 40 branches and sections. As such, it is important to communicate well during planning, as to allow leaders and soldiers to identify tasks for military occupations. This guideline applies to joint training events as well.

== Expeditionary sustainment commands ==
| Unit | Patch | Type | Headquarters |
|---|---|---|---|
| 3rd Corps Sustainment Command | | Active | Fort Bragg (NC) |
| 4th Expeditionary Sustainment Command | | Reserve | Joint Base San Antonio (TX) |
| 13th Armored Corps Sustainment Command | | Active | Fort Hood (TX) |
| 19th Expeditionary Sustainment Command | | Active | Camp Henry (South Korea) |
| 103rd Expeditionary Sustainment Command | | Reserve | Des Moines (IA) |
| 135th Expeditionary Sustainment Command | | National Guard | Birmingham (AL) |
| 143rd Expeditionary Sustainment Command | | Reserve | Orlando (FL) |
| 184th Sustainment Command | | National Guard | Laurel (MS) |
| 310th Expeditionary Sustainment Command | | Reserve | Indianapolis (IN) |
| 311th Expeditionary Sustainment Command | | Reserve | Los Angeles (CA) |
| 316th Expeditionary Sustainment Command | | Reserve | Coraopolis (PA) |
| 364th Expeditionary Sustainment Command | | Reserve | Marysville (WA) |
| 451st Expeditionary Sustainment Command | | Reserve | Wichita (KS) |
| 593rd Corps Sustainment Command | | Active | Joint Base Lewis-McChord (WA) |
