= Tracy A. Thompson =

Chief of Staff of the United States Army Reserve Command

Tracy A. Thompson is Chief of Staff of the United States Army Reserve Command.

== Career ==
Thompson originally enlisted in the United States Army Reserve in 1981 and would become a combat engineer, reaching the rank of sergeant. In 1984, he was commissioned an officer while assigned to the 416th Engineer Command.

He would serve a tour of duty during the Iraq War. Other assignments he has received include commanding the 300th Sustainment Brigade and the 420th Engineer Brigade. Thompson was promoted to major general in 2014. In 2017, he served as Deputy Commanding General (Support) of the United States Army Reserve Command before being named Chief of Staff.

Awards Thompson has received include the Legion of Merit, the Bronze Star Medal, the Meritorious Service Medal, the Army Commendation Medal, the Iraq Campaign Medal and the Army Meritorious Unit Commendation.

== Education ==
- B.S., Economics - University of Wisconsin-Madison (1986)
- J.D. - Northern Illinois University (1989)
- United States Army Command and General Staff College
- United States Army War College
- Capstone Military Leadership Program
