= Army Reserve Sustainment Command =

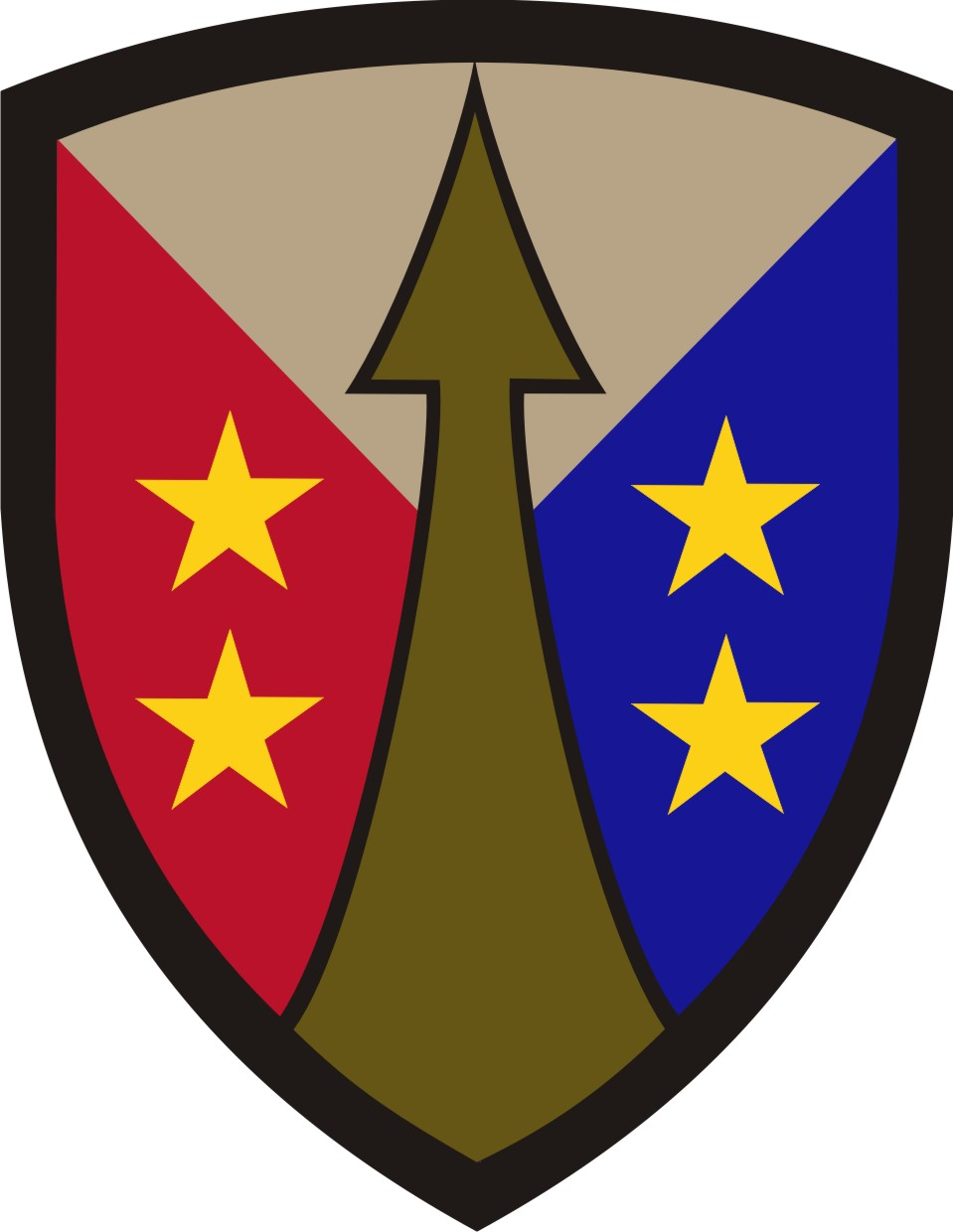
- Army Reserve Sustainment Command insignia
- Country: United States
- Branch: United States Army Reserve
- Type: Sustainment
- Size: 749
- Part of: 377th Theater Sustainment Command
- Garrison/HQ: Birmingham, Alabama
- Nickname: ARSC
- Motto: One Sustains Many
- Engagements: Operation Iraqi Freedom; Operation Enduring Freedom

Commanders
- Commanding officer: Brigadier General Heather A. Reuter
- Command Sergeant Major: CSM David W. Hausler

Insignia
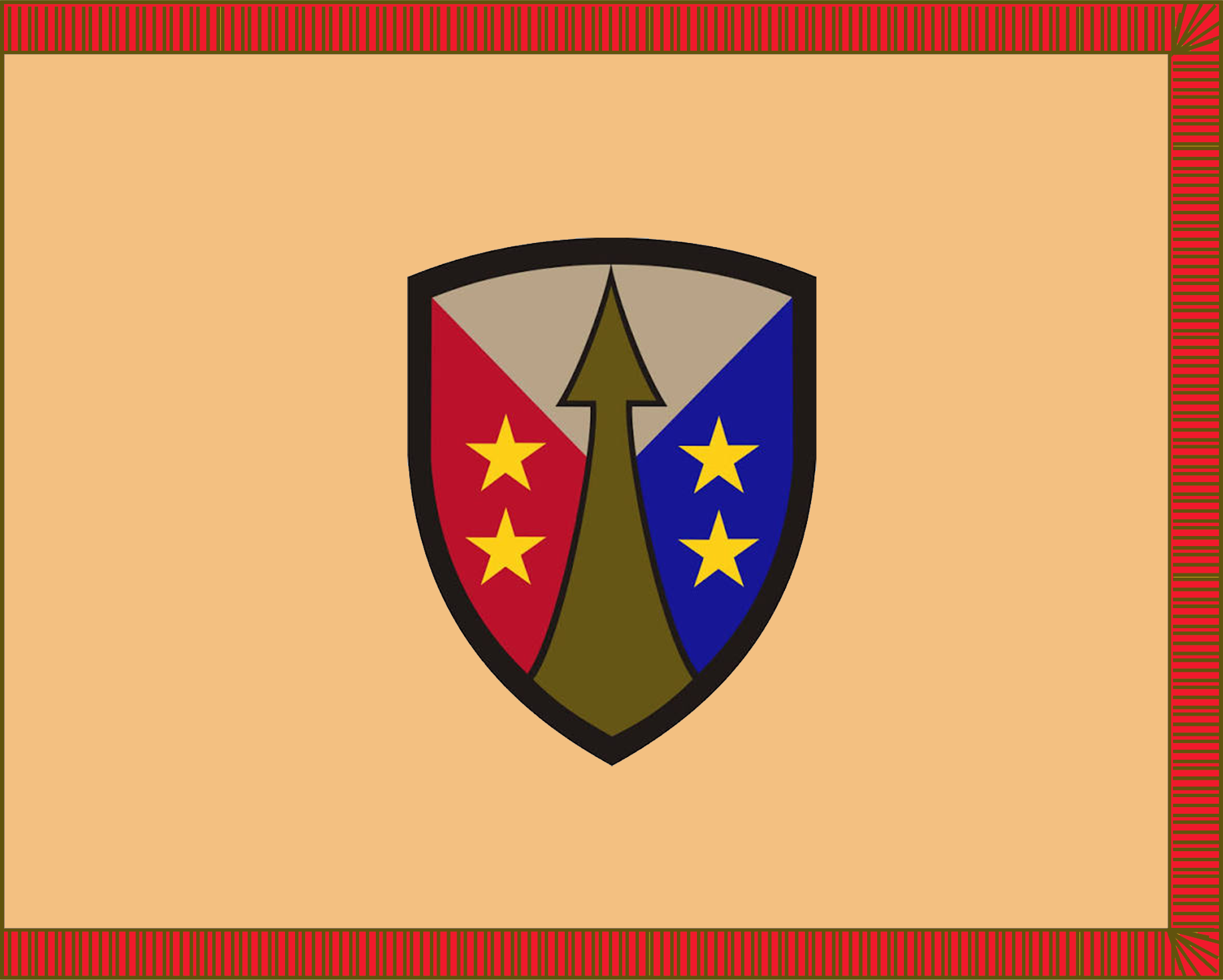
- US Army Reserve Sustainment Command Flag

The Army Reserve Sustainment Command (ARSC) is a subordinate command of the 377th Theater Sustainment Command. The Army Reserve Sustainment Command is located in Birmingham, Alabama. The command comprises five subordinate commands and has command and control of Army Reserve Soldiers throughout the United States. The United States Army Reserve Sustainment Command provides trained and ready Soldiers on a continuous and global basis to U.S. Army Materiel Command (AMC), the Assistant Secretary of the Army for Acquisition, Logistics and Technology (ASA(ALT)), the Defense Contract Management Agency (DCMA) and the Logistics Civil Augmentation Program (LOGCAP) in order to sustain Unified Land Operations.

The United States Army Reserve Sustainment Command (ARSC), a one-of-a-kind organization, received its permanent order in November 2007. Its headquarters office opened in January 2008 at 255 West Oxmoor Road, Birmingham, Alabama 35209. The ARSC moved from "carrier" status to fully operational status 17 October 2010.

The ARSC is a general officer command, commanded by Brigadier General Heather A. Reuter. The Command Sergeant Major is CSM David W. Hausler.

== Organization ==
As of January 2026 the following units are subordinated to the Army Reserve Sustainment Command:

- Army Reserve Sustainment Command, in Birmingham (AL)
  - Army Materiel Command — Army Reserve Element (AMC-ARE), at Redstone Arsenal (AL)
    - Detachments at Rock Island Arsenal (IL), Detroit Arsenal (MI), Letterkenny Army Depot (PA), Aberdeen Proving Ground (MD), Fort Bragg (NC), Fort Hood (TX), Joint Base Lewis–McChord (WA) and in Corpus Christi (TX)
  - Army Sustainment Command — Army Reserve Element (ASC-ARE), at Rock Island Arsenal (IL)
    - Detachments at Fort Bragg (NC), Fort Hood (TX), and Joint Base Lewis–McChord (WA)
    - Logistics Civil Augmentation Program (LOGCAP) Support Brigade, at Rock Island Arsenal (IL)
      - 1st LOGCAP Support Battalion, at Fort Belvoir (VA)
      - 2nd LOGCAP Support Battalion, at Rock Island Arsenal (IL)
      - 3rd LOGCAP Support Battalion, in Birmingham (AL)
      - 4th LOGCAP Support Battalion, in Athens (GA)
      - 5th LOGCAP Support Battalion, in Sheffield (AL)
  - Defense Contract Management Agency — Army Reserve Element (DCMA-ARE), at Fort Lee (VA)
    - Detachments in Mesa (AZ), in Phoenix (AZ), Arlington Heights (IL), Baltimore (MD), Ridley Park (PA), and at Sharpe Army Depot (CA) and Detroit Arsenal (MI)
    - 915th Contracting Battalion, in Baltimore (MD)
      - 653rd Support Detachment (Contracting Team), at Joint Base San Antonio (TX)
      - 654th Support Detachment (Contracting Team), at Joint Base San Antonio (TX)
      - 655th Support Detachment (Contracting Team), at Joint Base San Antonio (TX)
      - 656th Support Detachment (Contracting Team), at Joint Base San Antonio (TX)
      - 657th Support Detachment (Contracting Team), in Baltimore (MD)
      - 658th Support Detachment (Contracting Team), in Baltimore (MD)
      - 659th Support Detachment (Contracting Team), in Baltimore (MD)
      - 660th Support Detachment (Contracting Team), in Baltimore (MD)
      - 661st Support Detachment (Contracting Team), in Baltimore (MD)
      - 662nd Support Detachment (Contracting Team), in Baltimore (MD)
      - 663rd Support Detachment (Contracting Team), in Baltimore (MD)
      - 664th Support Detachment (Contracting Team), at Joint Forces Training Base – Los Alamitos (CA)
      - 665th Support Detachment (Contracting Team), at Joint Forces Training Base – Los Alamitos (CA)
      - 666th Support Detachment (Contracting Team), at Joint Forces Training Base – Los Alamitos (CA)
      - 667th Support Detachment (Contracting Team), at Joint Forces Training Base – Los Alamitos (CA)

== Mission ==
The ARSC provides trained and ready U.S. Army Reserve Soldiers in support of Army Materiel Command (AMC), Assistant Secretary of the Army (Acquisition, Logistics, and Technology) ASA(ALT), Defense Contract Management Agency (DCMA), Defense Logistics Agency (DLA), Logistics Civil Augmentation Program (LOGCAP), and Acquisition Contracting Command (ACC) worldwide mission requirements.

The ARSC Command Group provides trained acquisition and logistics professionals, ready for worldwide deployment or mobilization, to augment active duty military or civilian Army Materiel Command, and to provide mission command to the ARSC command itself.

== Task organization ==
This command currently is organized into several Brigade structures, spread in as many locations to support all Army Materiel Command Major Subordinate Commands and Life Cycle Management Commands.

== Heraldry information ==
Shoulder sleeve insignia

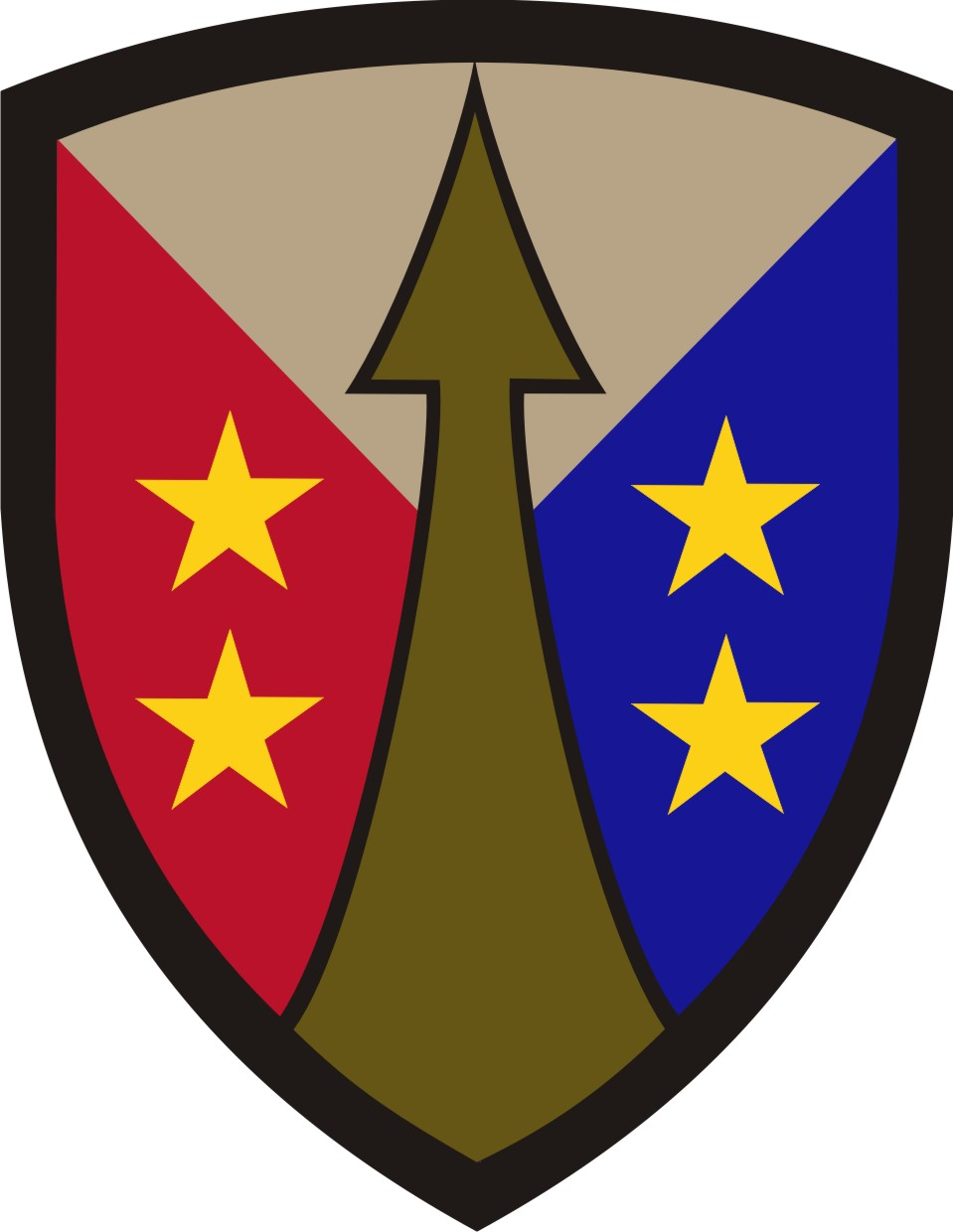
Army Reserve Sustainment Command shoulder sleeve insignia

Description: A shield shape device 2 3/4 inches (6.99 cm) in height and 2 1/8 inches (5.40 cm) in width overall, divided per pall buff, scarlet and blue, overall a bronze arrow fimbriated black issuing from base throughout with sides curved slightly inward, on either side of the arrow shaft are two gold stars palewise; all within a 1/8 inch (.32 cm) black border.

Symbolism: The shield is adapted from the Army Materiel Command (AMC) and highlights the direct support to AMC and its subordinate elements. The colors signify the Command's missions. Bronze, buff and red indicate the sustainment/support role as well as the tie to the logistics community. Blue is a nod to the support mission for Defense Contract Management Agency as well as AMC. The four stars represent strength, experience, knowledge, and support. The arrow, flaring up from the base, represents the focus to bring the strength and teamwork of both officers and enlisted to one focus or point to support the mission of many.

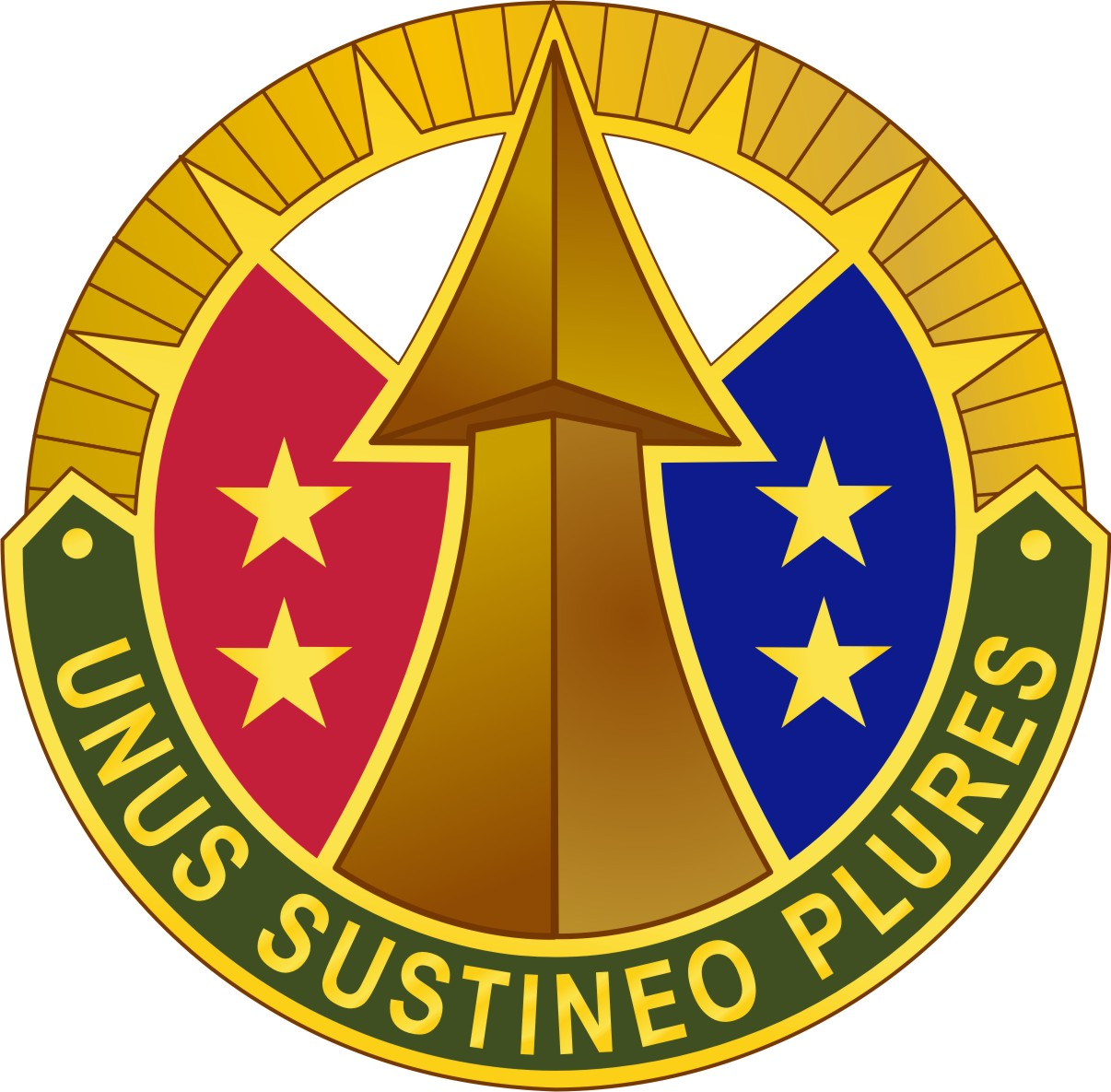
ARSC distinctive unit insignia

Distinctive unit insignia

Gold is emblematic of honor and high ideals. The colors and configuration of the disc refer to Army Materiel Command and support to its subordinate elements. The four stars represent the strength, experience, knowledge, and support. The compass points and rayed lines on the back disc signify a compass rose and highlight the worldwide mission of the Command. The arrow, flaring up from the base, represents the focus to bring the strength of both officers and enlisted to the one focus or point to support the mission of many. It also underscores the Command's motto which translates to "One Sustains Many." The green of the motto scroll points out the United States Army and its total readiness.
