= Theater Sustainment Command =

US Army logistics headquarters

A theater sustainment command is a United States Army logistics headquarters. The theater sustainment command is the senior army logistics command in a theater. The command is a modular organization tailored to meet specific requirements of the theater. It will command one or more sustainment commands.

When serving in a joint environment where the army is the dominant service, the TSC could provide core elements of a single, joint logistics command and control capability.

== Theater sustainment commands ==
Unit	Patch	Component	Headquarters
1st Sustainment Command (Theater)		Active Duty	Fort Knox, Kentucky
8th Theater Sustainment Command		Active Duty	Fort Shafter, Hawaii
21st Theater Sustainment Command		Active Duty	Kaiserslautern, Germany
79th Theater Sustainment Command		Army Reserve	Joint Forces Training Base, Los Alamitos, CA
167th Theater Sustainment Command		Army National Guard	Fort McClellan, Alabama
377th Theater Sustainment Command		Army Reserve	Belle Chasse, Louisiana
