= 211th Regional Support Group =

- Country: United States
- Branch: United States Army Reserve
- Size: Brigade
- Part of: 4th Expeditionary Sustainment Command
- Garrison/HQ: Corpus Christi, Texas

The 211th Regional Support Group is a United States Army Reserve unit which controls two Combat Sustainment Support Battalions within Texas.

== Units ==
The group is a subordinate unit of the 4th Expeditionary Sustainment Command. As of January 2026 the group consists of the following units:

- 211th Regional Support Group, in Corpus Christi (TX)
  - Headquarters and Headquarters Company, 211th Regional Support Group, in Corpus Christi (TX)
  - 319th Combat Sustainment Support Battalion, in Harlingen (TX)
    - Headquarters and Headquarters Company, 319th Combat Sustainment Support Battalion, in Harlingen (TX)
    - 370th Transportation Medium Truck Company (PLS) (EAB Tactical), in Brownsville (TX)
    - 519th Transportation Detachment (Trailer Transfer Point Team), in McAllen (TX)
    - 554th Transportation Detachment (Movement Control Team), in McAllen (TX)
    - 812th Quartermaster Company (Supply), in Kingsville (TX)
    - 851st Transportation Medium Truck Company (PLS) (EAB Tactical), in Sinton (TX)
    - 961st Quartermaster Company (Water Purification and Distribution), in McAllen (TX)
    - 971st Quartermaster Detachment (Tactical Water Distribution Team) (Hoseline), in McAllen (TX)
  - 373rd Combat Sustainment Support Battalion, in Beaumont (TX)
    - Headquarters and Headquarters Company, 373rd Combat Sustainment Support Battalion, in Beaumont (TX)
    - 79th Quartermaster Company (Supply), in Houston (TX)
    - 103rd Quartermaster Company (Supply), in Houston (TX)
    - 288th Quartermaster Company (Water Purification and Distribution), in Victoria (TX)
    - 1002nd Quartermaster Company (Petroleum Pipeline and Terminal Operation), in Beaumont (TX)
      - Detachment 1, 1002nd Quartermaster Company (Petroleum Pipeline and Terminal Operation), at Ellington Field Joint Reserve Base (TX)

Abbreviations: PLS — Palletized Load System; EAB — Echelon Above Brigade
