= 300th Sustainment Brigade =

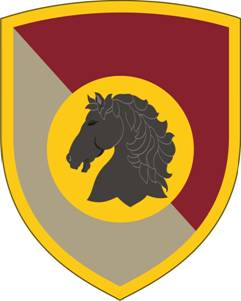
- 300th Sustainment Brigade shoulder sleeve insignia
- Active: 19 April 2008 – present
- Country: United States
- Branch: United States Army Reserve
- Type: Sustainment Brigade
- Role: Sustainment
- Size: Brigade
- Part of: 4th Expeditionary Sustainment Command
- Garrison/HQ: Grand Prairie, Texas
- Nicknames: Black Stallion, Black Horse

Commanders
- Current commander: Colonel Dawn M. Johnson
- Notable commanders: Major General Tracy A. Thompson

Insignia
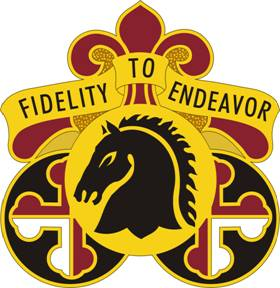
- Distinctive Unit Insignia

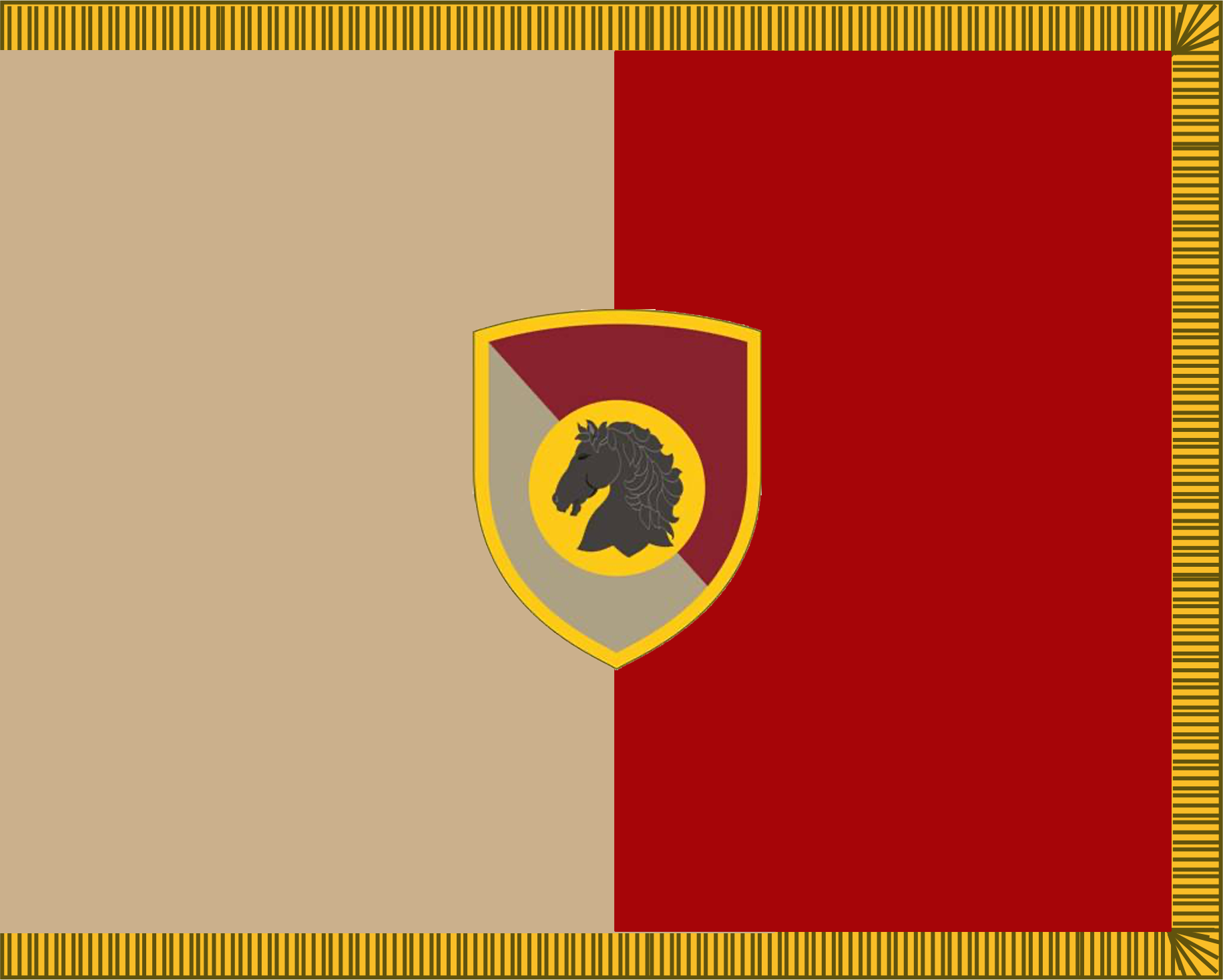
- 300th Sustainment Brigade Flag

The 300th Sustainment Brigade is a Major Subordinate Command (MSC) of the 4th Expeditionary Sustainment Command (4th ESC) and one of only eighth of its kind in the United States Army Reserve. This unit is one of the latest additions in the Army Transformation process for the 4th ESC, and manage a peacetime downtrace that has command and control of approximately 3,500 army reservists located throughout the Texas area, and its soldiers support diverse missions that are logistical in nature.

== Organization ==
The brigade is a subordinate unit of the 4th Expeditionary Sustainment Command. As of January 2026 the brigade consists of the following units:

- 300th Sustainment Brigade, in Grand Prairie (TX)
  - 300th Special Troops Battalion, in Grand Prairie (TX)
    - Headquarters and Headquarters Company, 300th Sustainment Brigade, in Grand Prairie (TX)
    - 358th Brigade Signal Company (MEB/CAB/SB), in Round Rock (TX)
  - 363rd Quartermaster Battalion (Petroleum Support), in San Marcos (TX)
    - Headquarters and Headquarters Detachment, 363rd Quartermaster Battalion (Petroleum Support), in San Marcos (TX)
    - 141st Quartermaster Company (Petroleum Pipeline and Terminal Operation), in Tyler (TX)
    - 223rd Ordnance Company (Support Maintenance), in Grand Prairie (TX)
    - 320th Quartermaster Detachment (Petroleum Liaison Team), in Fort Worth (TX)
    - 328th Human Resources Company, in San Antonio (TX)
      - Detachment 1, 328th Human Resources Company, at Joint Base San Antonio (TX)
      - Detachment 2, 328th Human Resources Company, in Tulsa (OK)
    - 340th Quartermaster Company (Field Service) (Modular), at Joint Base San Antonio (TX)
    - 343rd Transportation Detachment (Movement Control Team), in Round Rock (TX)
    - 350th Personnel Company (Postal), in Grand Prairie (TX)
    - 411th Quartermaster Detachment (Theater Petroleum Laboratory Team), in Grand Prairie (TX)
    - 645th Quartermaster Detachment (Petroleum Liaison Team), in San Marcos (TX)
    - 957th Quartermaster Company (Petroleum Support), in Denton (TX)

== Mission ==
The 300th Sustainment Brigade mission is to plan, coordinate, synchronize, monitor, and control Logistics Operations within an assigned area of responsibility. The Brigade also coordinates Host Nation Support (HNS) and contracting, as well as providing support to joint, interagency, and multinational forces as directed.

== History ==
The 300th Sustainment Brigade's history began on 26 June 1945 as the 300th Transportation Group. The unit activated on 29 June 1945 in France, and was inactivated in France on 22 November 1945. The 300th was redesignated as the 300th Transportation Corps Service Group on 2 December 1946 and allotted to the Organized Reserves. On 12 December 1946 the unit was activated in Baltimore, Maryland. During that timeframe, the Organized Reserves became the Army Reserve on 9 July 1952. The unit inactivated on 29 August, and during inactivation was redesignated as the 300th Transportation Group on 3 April 1959. The unit changed locations several more times to include Fort George Meade, Maryland, on 1 November 1960; Andrew Air Force Base, Maryland, on 20 May 1964; and Butler, Pennsylvania, on 31 January 1968. The 300th moved from Butler, Pennsylvania, on 18 September 2009 where it was redesignated and activated as the first Army Reserve Sustainment Command in the state of Texas. An activation ceremony was held on 19 April 2008 in Grand Prairie at the Armed Forces Reserve Complex. The 300th was activated for mobilization to Kuwait and supporting areas in October 2018 in support of Operation Spartan Shield and Operation Inherent Resolve to provide logistical support for the warfighters. The 300th has since completed their rotation in July 2019 respectively.
