= 90th Sustainment Brigade =

- 90th Sustainment Brigade shoulder sleeve insignia
- Active: 22 April 1968–16 April 1996 (90th ARCOM); 16 April 1996–16 July 2003 (90th RSC); 16 July 2003–22 August 2009 (90th RRC); 22 August 2009–present (90th Sust. Bge.)
- Country: United States
- Branch: United States Army Reserve
- Type: Sustainment Brigade
- Size: Brigade
- Part of: 4th Expeditionary Sustainment Command
- Garrison/HQ: North Little Rock, Arkansas
- Motto: Tough ‘Ombres
- Engagements: Global War on Terrorism; Iraq

Commanders
- Commanding Officer: COL Jeffrey Jones
- Command Sergeant Major: CSM Melroy Harrison

Insignia
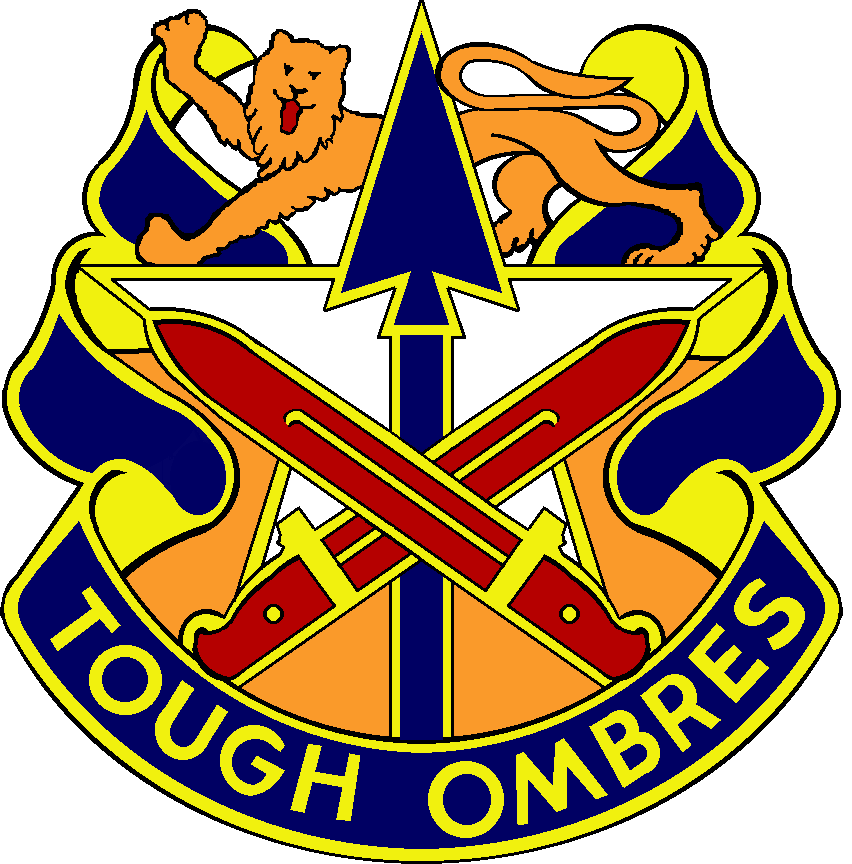
- 90th Sustainment Brigade DUI

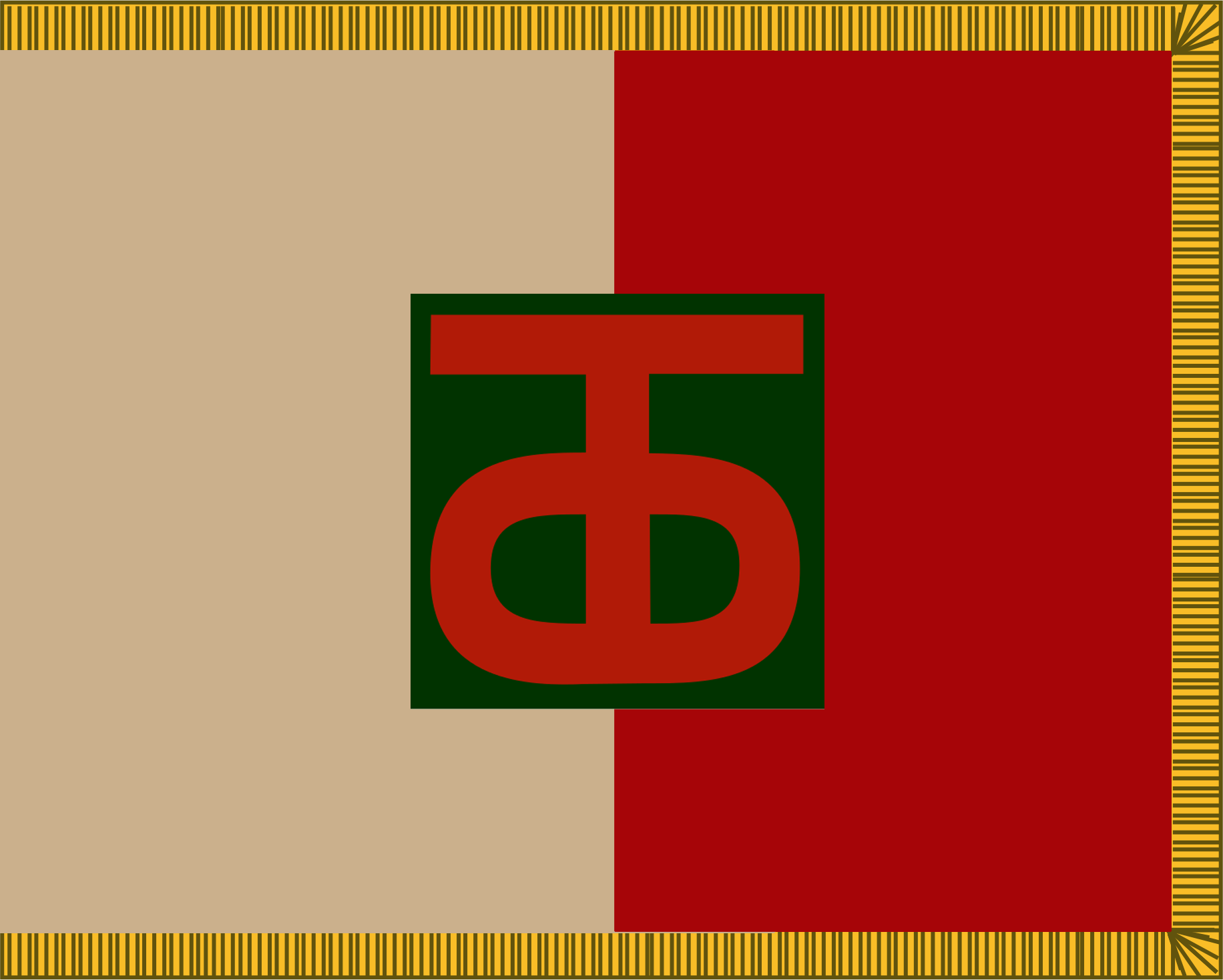
- 90th Sustainment Brigade Flag

122nd Army Reserve Command SSI

90th Sustainment Brigade is a United States Army Reserve Sustainment Brigade which is split between the states of Arkansas, Oklahoma and Texas. The brigade inherited the lineage of the 90th Infantry Division. It was originally known after it was no longer a division as the 90th Army Reserve Command (90th ARCOM) and it mobilized troops for Operations Desert Shield and Desert Storm. It was reassigned as the 90th Regional Support Command (90th RSC) on 16 April 1996 mobilizing for Operations Noble Eagle, Enduring Freedom and Iraqi Freedom. At this time it also merged with the 122nd Army Reserve Command. It was then redesignated for the 90th Regional Readiness Command (90th RRC) on 16 July 2003, and finally redesignated for the 90th Sustainment Brigade on 17 September 2008.

== Organization ==
The brigade is a subordinate unit of the 4th Expeditionary Sustainment Command. As of January 2026 the brigade consists of the following units:

- 90th Sustainment Brigade, at Camp Robinson (AR)
  - 90th Special Troops Battalion, at Camp Robinson (AR)
    - Headquarters and Headquarters Company, 90th Sustainment Brigade, at Camp Robinson (AR)
  - 316th Quartermaster Battalion (Petroleum Support), in Okmulgee (OK)
    - Headquarters and Headquarters Detachment, 316th Quartermaster Battalion (Petroleum Support), in Okmulgee (OK)
    - 315th Quartermaster Detachment (Petroleum Liaison Team), in Broken Arrow (OK)
    - 327th Transportation Detachment (Movement Control Team), in Stillwater (OK)
    - 481st Transportation Detachment (Movement Control Team), in Bartlesville (OK)
    - 589th Transportation Detachment (Movement Control Team), at Fort Sill (OK)
    - 801st Human Resources Company, in Tulsa (OK)
      - 1st Platoon, 801st Human Resources Company, at Red River Army Depot (TX)
    - 883rd Quartermaster Company (Petroleum Support), in Broken Arrow (OK)
    - 910th Quartermaster Company (Petroleum Support), in Ardmore (OK)
      - 1st Platoon, 910th Quartermaster Company (Petroleum Support), in Ada (OK)
      - 2nd Platoon, 910th Quartermaster Company (Petroleum Support), at Fort Sill (OK)
  - 348th Transportation Battalion (Terminal), in Houston (TX)
    - Headquarters and Headquarters Detachment, 348th Transportation Battalion (Terminal), in Houston (TX)
    - 217th Transportation Company (Combat HET), at Joint Base San Antonio (TX)
    - 388th Transportation Detachment (Movement Control Team), in Houston (TX)
    - 453rd Transportation Company (Inland Cargo Transfer Company — ICTC), in Sinton (TX)
    - 499th Transportation Detachment (Movement Control Team), in Houston (TX)
    - 644th Transportation Medium Truck Company (PLS) (EAB Tactical), in Houston (TX)

Abbreviations: PLS — Palletized Load System; HET — Heavy Equipment Transporter; EAB — Echelon Above Brigade
