= 310th Expeditionary Sustainment Command =

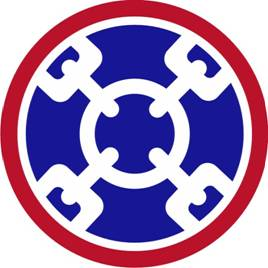
- Shoulder sleeve insignia
- Active: 1950–present
- Country: United States
- Branch: United States Army Reserve
- Type: Sustainment
- Role: Expeditionary Sustainment Command
- Size: Brigade
- Part of: 377th Theater Sustainment Command
- Garrison/HQ: Indianapolis, Indiana, US
- Motto: "Victory Through Support"
- Engagements: War on terror; Iraq War
- Website: Official Website

Commanders
- Commander: BG Stephen M. Pazak
- Command Sergeant Major: CSM Gregory Chandler

Insignia
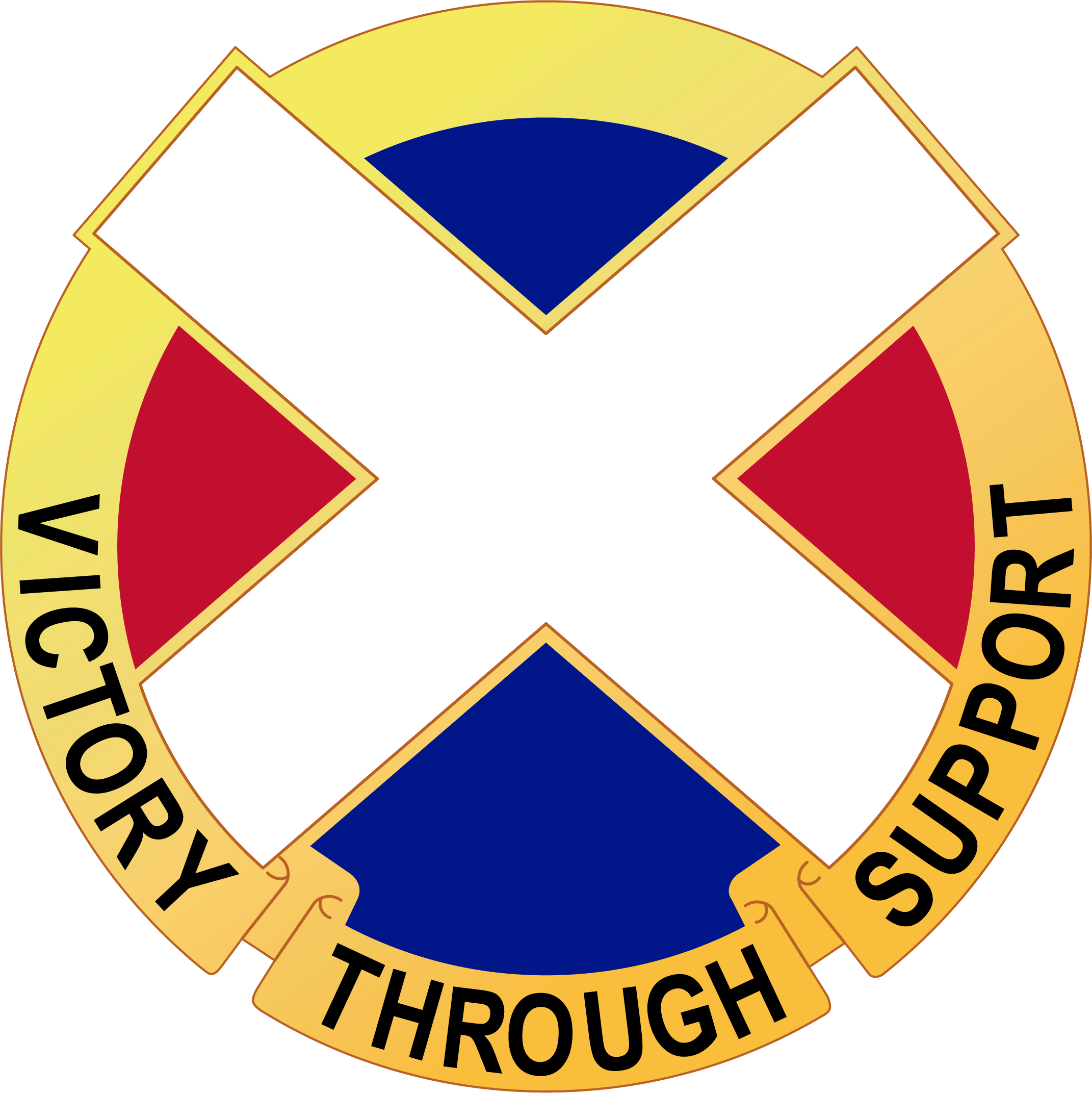
- 310th Sustainment Command DUI

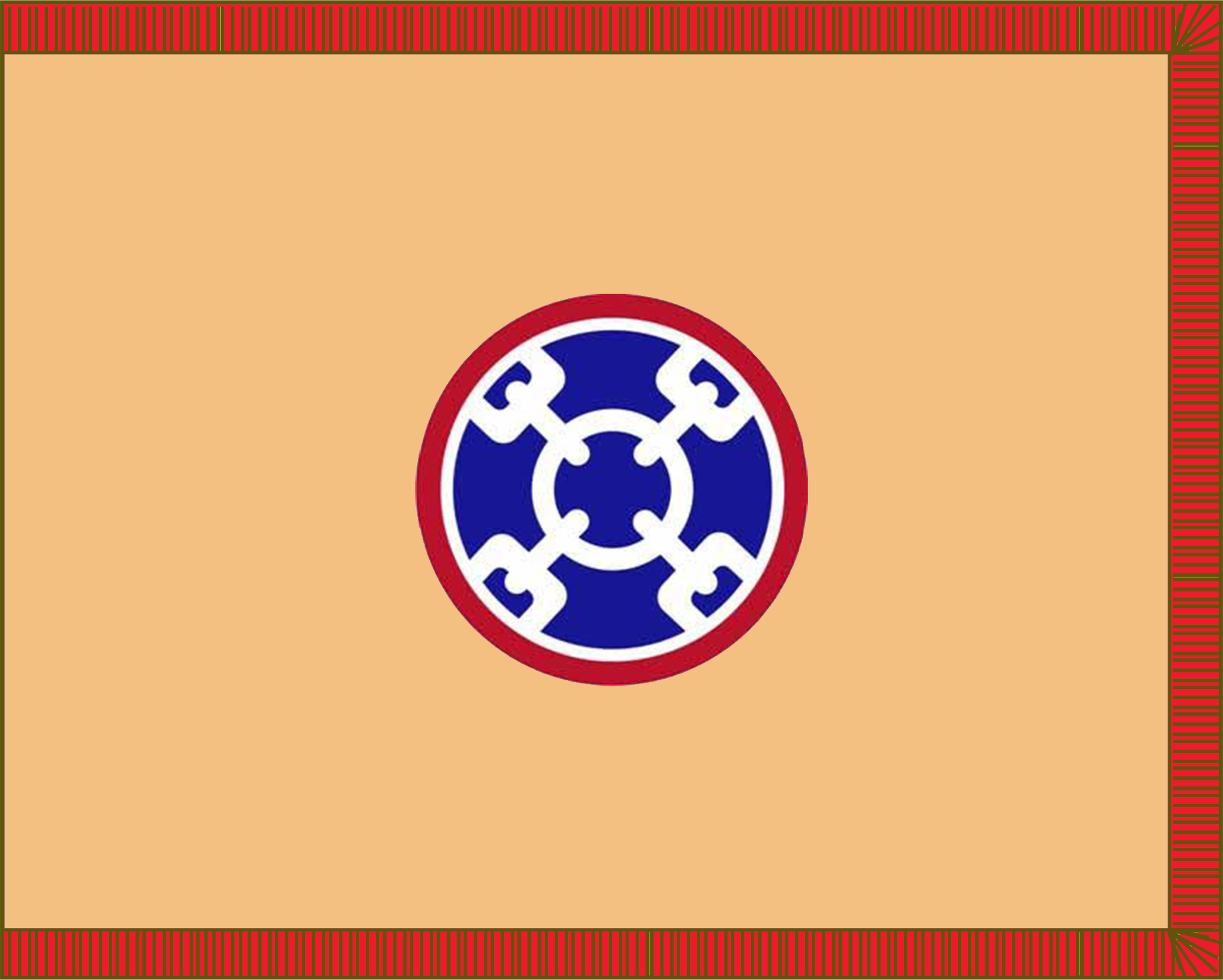
- 310th Sustainment Command Flag

310th Expeditionary Sustainment Command (310 ESC) is an Army Reserve unit subordinate to 377th Theater Sustainment Command headquartered in Indianapolis, Indiana. The command provides command and control for sustainment units through Alabama, Delaware, Indiana, Kentucky, Maryland, North Carolina, Ohio, Tennessee, West Virginia, and Virginia. 310th ESC provides trained and ready sustainment forces in support of global contingency operations.

== Mission ==
On order, 310th ESC is prepared to deploy and provide command and control to all assigned and attached units and to provide sustainment planning, guidance and support to forces in an area of operations.

== Mobilizations & Deployments ==
Period	Mission	Location
2020 - 2021	Operational Command Post, 1st Theater Sustainment Command	Kuwait
2014 - 2015	Logistical Support to Fort Hood, TX in support of Operation Enduring Freedom	Fort Hood, TX
2011	Sustainment Support for Operation New Dawn, drawdown of US forces, and transition to Department of State	Balad, Iraq and Camp Buehring, Kuwait

== Organization ==
The command is a subordinate unit of the 377th Theater Sustainment Command. As of January 2026 the command consists of the following units:

- 310th Expeditionary Sustainment Command, in Indianapolis (IN)
  - Headquarters and Headquarters Company, 310th Expeditionary Sustainment Command, in Indianapolis (IN)
  - 398th Financial Management Support Center, at Fort Belvoir (VA)
  - 374th Financial Management Support Unit, in Newark (DE)
    - Detachment 1, 374th Financial Management Support Unit, in Owings Mills (MD)
    - Detachment 2, 374th Financial Management Support Unit, at Fort Belvoir (VA)
    - Detachment 3, 374th Financial Management Support Unit, at Fort Lee (VA)
    - Detachment 4, 374th Financial Management Support Unit, in New Cumberland (PA)
  - 38th Regional Support Group, in Cross Lanes (WV)
    - Headquarters and Headquarters Company, 38th Regional Support Group, in Cross Lanes (WV)
    - 373rd Quartermaster Battalion (Petroleum Support), in Jeffersonville (IN)
      - Headquarters and Headquarters Detachment, 373rd Quartermaster Battalion (Petroleum Support), in Jeffersonville (IN)
      - 125th Transportation Medium Truck Company (POL, 5K GAL) (EAB Linehaul), in Lexington (KY)
        - Detachment 1, 125th Transportation Medium Truck Company (POL, 5K GAL) (EAB Linehaul), in Bardstown (KY)
      - 212th Transportation Medium Truck Company (PLS) (EAB Tactical), in Chattanooga (TN)
        - Detachment 1, 212th Transportation Medium Truck Company (PLS) (EAB Tactical), in Nashville (TN)
      - 591st Transportation Detachment (Trailer Transfer Point Team), in Chattanooga (TN)
      - 655th Transportation Medium Truck Company (POL, 7.5K GAL) (EAB Linehaul), in Millington (TN)
        - Detachment 1, 655th Transportation Medium Truck Company (POL, 7.5K GAL) (EAB Linehaul), in Galax (VA)
      - 942nd Quartermaster Detachment (Petroleum Liaison Team), at Fort Belvoir (VA)
    - 380th Quartermaster Battalion (Petroleum Support), in Evansville (IN)
      - Headquarters and Headquarters Detachment, 380th Quartermaster Battalion (Petroleum Support), in Evansville (IN)
      - 209th Quartermaster Company (Supply), in Lafayette (IN)
      - 380th Quartermaster Company (Petroleum Pipeline and Terminal Operation), in Evansville (IN)
        - Detachment 1, 380th Quartermaster Company (Petroleum Pipeline and Terminal Operation), in Jeffersonville (IN)
      - 417th Quartermaster Company (Petroleum Pipeline and Terminal Operation), in Scottsburg (IN)
        - Detachment 1, 417th Quartermaster Company (Petroleum Pipeline and Terminal Operation), in Franklin (IN)
      - 690th Quartermaster Detachment (Petroleum Liaison Team), in Evansville (IN)
  - 55th Sustainment Brigade, at Fort Belvoir (VA)
    - 55th Special Troops Battalion, at Fort Belvoir (VA)
      - Headquarters and Headquarters Company, 55th Sustainment Brigade, at Fort Belvoir (VA)
      - 410th Brigade Signal Company (MEB/CAB/SB), at Fort Belvoir (VA)
    - 313th Transportation Battalion (Movement Control), in Baltimore (MD)
      - Headquarters and Headquarters Detachment, 313th Transportation Battalion (Movement Control), in Baltimore (MD)
      - 199th Transportation Detachment (Movement Control Team), in Upper Marlboro (MD)
      - 200th Transportation Detachment (Movement Control Team), in Baltimore (MD)
      - 319th Transportation Detachment (Movement Control Team), in Dover (DE)
      - 430th Transportation Company (Inland Cargo Transfer Company — ICTC), in Baltimore (MD)
        - Detachment 1, 430th Transportation Company (Inland Cargo Transfer Company — ICTC), at Biddle Air National Guard Base (PA)
      - 678th Transportation Detachment (Movement Control Team), at Joint Base Langley–Eustis (VA)
      - 679th Transportation Detachment (Movement Control Team), at Fort Eustis (VA)
    - 398th Combat Sustainment Support Battalion, in Rockville (MD)
      - Headquarters and Headquarters Company, 398th Combat Sustainment Support Battalion, in Rockville (MD)
      - 611th Quartermaster Company (Field Service) (Modular), in Baltimore (MD)
      - 673rd Quartermaster Company (Mortuary Affairs), in Dover (DE)
      - 774th Quartermaster Detachment (Field Feeding Team), in Salem (VA)
      - 775th Quartermaster Detachment (Field Feeding Team), in Towson (MD)
      - 776th Quartermaster Detachment (Field Feeding Team), in Rockville (MD)
      - 818th Ordnance Company (Support Maintenance), at Fort Meade (MD)
      - 946th Transportation Medium Truck Company (POL, 5K GAL) (EAB Linehaul), in Lewes (DE)
        - Detachment 1, 946th Transportation Medium Truck Company (POL, 5K GAL) (EAB Linehaul), in Newark (DE)
      - 988th Quartermaster Detachment (Theater Petroleum Laboratory Team), in Rockville (MD)
      - 1015th Quartermaster Company (Supply), in Baltimore (MD)
    - 497th Combat Sustainment Support Battalion, in Salem (VA)
      - Headquarters and Headquarters Company, 497th Combat Sustainment Support Battalion, in Salem (VA)
      - 261st Ordnance Company (Ammo) (Modular), in Charleston (WV)
        - 1st Platoon, 261st Ordnance Company (Ammo) (Modular), in Millwood (WV)
        - 2nd Platoon, 261st Ordnance Company (Ammo) (Modular), in Kenova (WV)
      - 275th Quartermaster Company (Field Service) (Modular), at Fort Pickett (VA)
      - 424th Transportation Medium Truck Company (Cargo) (EAB Linehaul), in Dublin (VA)
        - Detachment 1, 424th Transportation Medium Truck Company (Cargo) (EAB Linehaul), at Joint Expeditionary Base Little Creek–Fort Story (VA)
      - 639th Transportation Medium Truck Company (PLS) (EAB Tactical), in Bedford (VA)
      - 751st Quartermaster Company (Petroleum Support), in Bedford (VA)
      - 811th Ordnance Company (Ammo) (Modular), in Rainelle (WV)
        - 1st Platoon, 811th Ordnance Company (Ammo) (Modular), in Dublin (VA)
        - 2nd Platoon, 811th Ordnance Company (Ammo) (Modular), at Letterkenny Army Depot (PA)
  - 354th Quartermaster Group (Petroleum Support), in Whitehall (OH)
    - Headquarters and Headquarters Company, 354th Quartermaster Group (Petroleum Support), in Whitehall (OH)
    - 319th Quartermaster Battalion (Petroleum Support), in Twinsburg (OH)
      - Headquarters and Headquarters Detachment, 319th Quartermaster Battalion (Petroleum Support), in Twinsburg (OH)
      - 192nd Quartermaster Company (Petroleum Support), in Milan (OH)
        - 1st Platoon, 192nd Quartermaster Company (Petroleum Support), in North Canton (OH)
        - 2nd Platoon, 192nd Quartermaster Company (Petroleum Support), in Delaware (OH)
      - 654th Quartermaster Detachment (Petroleum Liaison Team), in Columbus (OH)
      - 660th Transportation Detachment (Movement Control Team), in Delaware (OH)
      - 762nd Transportation Medium Truck Company (Cargo) (EAB Linehaul), in North Canton (OH)
    - 633rd Quartermaster Battalion (Petroleum Support), in Sharonville (OH)
      - Headquarters and Headquarters Detachment, 633rd Quartermaster Battalion (Petroleum Support), in Sharonville (OH)
      - 771st Quartermaster Detachment (Field Feeding Team), in Sharonville (OH)
      - 772nd Quartermaster Detachment (Field Feeding Team), in Whitehall (OH)
      - 773rd Quartermaster Detachment (Field Feeding Team), in Evansville (IN)
      - 810th Quartermaster Company (Water Purification and Distribution), in Maineville (OH)
        - 2nd Platoon, 810th Quartermaster Company (Water Purification and Distribution), in Cincinnati (OH)
      - 1001st Quartermaster Company (Petroleum Support), in Chillicothe (OH)
  - 643rd Regional Support Group, in Whitehall (OH)
    - Headquarters and Headquarters Company, 643rd Regional Support Group, in Whitehall (OH)
    - 718th Transportation Battalion (Motor), in Columbus (OH)
      - Headquarters and Headquarters Detachment, 718th Transportation Battalion (Motor), in Columbus (OH)
      - 454th Transportation Medium Truck Company (POL, 5K GAL) (EAB Linehaul), in Columbus (OH)
        - Detachment 1, 454th Transportation Medium Truck Company (POL, 5K GAL) (EAB Linehaul), in Springfield (OH)
      - 521st Transportation Detachment (Movement Control Team), in Dayton (OH)
      - 705th Transportation Medium Truck Company (POL, 7.5K GAL) (EAB Linehaul), in Dayton (OH)
      - 706th Transportation Medium Truck Company (PLS) (EAB Tactical), in Trenton (OH)
      - 758th Ordnance Company (Support Maintenance), in Columbus (OH)
        - Detachment 1, 758th Ordnance Company (Support Maintenance), in North Canton (OH)
      - 869th Transportation Detachment (Movement Control Team), in Columbus (OH)
    - 766th Transportation Battalion (Motor), in South Bend (IN)
      - Headquarters and Headquarters Detachment, 766th Transportation Battalion (Motor), in South Bend (IN)
      - 511th Transportation Detachment (Trailer Transfer Point Team), in Michigan City (IN)
      - 523rd Transportation Detachment (Movement Control Team), in Michigan City (IN)
      - 624th Quartermaster Company (Petroleum Support), in Michigan City (IN)
      - 656th Transportation Medium Truck Company (POL, 5K GAL) (EAB Linehaul), in Hobart (IN)
        - Detachment 1, 656th Transportation Medium Truck Company (POL, 5K GAL) (EAB Linehaul), in Kingsbury (IN)
        - Detachment 2, 656th Transportation Medium Truck Company (POL, 5K GAL) (EAB Linehaul), in Jefferson (IN)
      - 221st Ordnance Company, Fort Wayne, Indiana
      - 855th Quartermaster Company (Field Service) (Modular), in South Bend (IN)
        - Detachment 1, 855th Quartermaster Company (Field Service) (Modular), at Grissom Air Reserve Base (IN)

Abbreviations: PLS — Palletized Load System; POL — Petroleum Oil Lubricants; EAB — Echelon Above Brigade
