= 143rd Expeditionary Sustainment Command =

- Shoulder sleeve insignia
- Active: 1967 - present
- Country: United States
- Branch: United States Army Reserve
- Role: Expeditionary Sustainment Command
- Part of: 377th Theater Sustainment Command
- Reserve Center: 1LT David R. Wilson Armed Forces Reserve Center Orlando, Florida
- Engagements: Operation Enduring Freedom 2003-2007, 2009-2010, 2013-2014, 2018-2019
- Decorations: Meritorious Unit Commendation (3)

Commanders
- Current commander: COL Dawn M. Johnson
- Notable commanders: LTG (Ret) Jack C. Stultz

Insignia
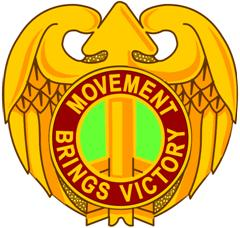
- Distinctive Unit Insignia

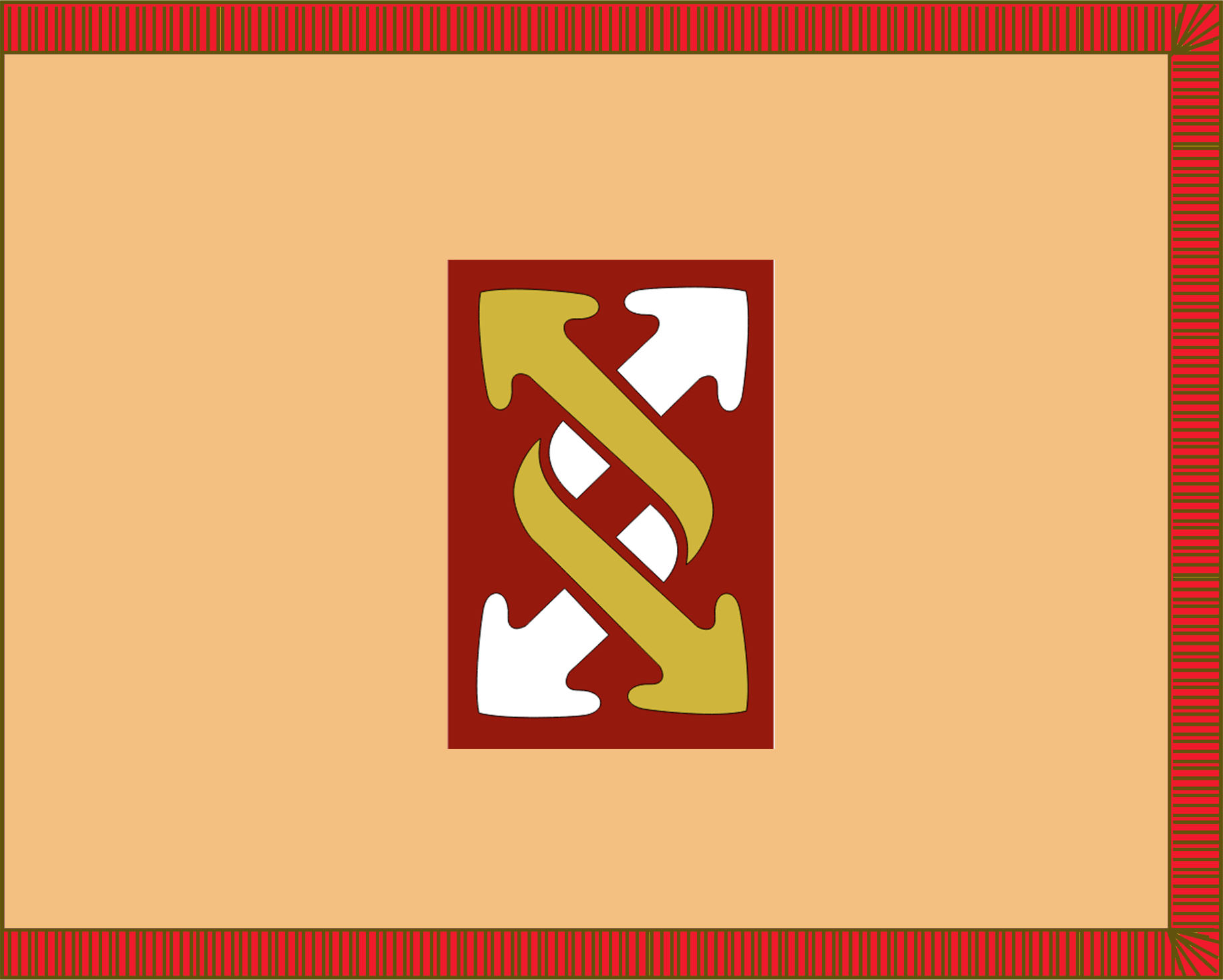
- 143rd Sustainment Command Flag

The 143rd Expeditionary Sustainment Command (143 ESC) is one of seven general officer sustainment commands in the United States Army Reserve. It has command and control of more than 10,000 Army Reserve Soldiers throughout the southeastern United States in Alabama, Florida, Georgia, Louisiana, North Carolina, South Carolina, Tennessee, Arkansas and Mississippi. It is made up of more than 100 Army Reserve units whose missions are diverse and logistical in nature. The mission of the 143rd ESC is to provide command and control of sustainment forces and to conduct sustainment, deployment, redeployment and retrograde operations in support of U.S. and multinational forces. The mission of the 143rd when not deployed is to ensure readiness of the soldiers under its command and control.

The 143rd ESC was formerly the 143rd Transportation Command.

The ESC is a peacetime subordinate to the 377th Theater Sustainment Command.

== History ==
The Command was originally constituted as the 143rd Transportation Command 24 November 1967 in the Army Reserve and activated 2 January 1968 in Orlando, Florida. It was reorganized and redesignated 16 October 1985 as the 143d Transportation Command. From 2003 to 2007, it maintained a continuous presence in Southwest Asia in support of US Military Units engaged in the War in Afghanistan (2001-2021) and the Iraq War. In a ceremony 17 September 2007, the 143rd Transportation Command cased its command colors for the last time signifying the end of the unit's era as a major transportation command headquarters. Immediately following, the new 143rd ESC Commanding General, Brigadier General Daniel I. Schultz, uncased the 143rd ESC colors, signifying the standup of this new logistics headquarters and the start of a new era for the 143rd.

Six months after the transition ceremony the 143rd ESC received a Department of the Army warning order for mobilization and deployment of its headquarters. Since receipt of the warning order, the 143rd ESC prepared for deployment by completing various Soldier readiness activities including soldier readiness processing, a sustainment training exercise conducted at Ft. Lee, Virginia and warrior training at the Regional Training Center, Ft. Hunter Liggett, California.

On 9 January 2009, the 143rd ESC deployed in support of the troop buildup in Afghanistan for Operation Enduring Freedom. The 143rd's deployment is the first time an ESC has deployed to Afghanistan. The mission of the 143d ESC during this deployment is to provide command and control of assigned forces, and to conduct sustainment, deployment, redeployment and retrograde operations in support of U.S. and multinational forces in the U.S. Central Command area of operations. In December 2009 the 143rd ESC turned over command of the Joint Sustainment Command-Afghanistan to the 135th Expeditionary Sustainment Command.

In June 2013, the 143rd ESC once again mobilized in support of Operation Enduring Freedom and deployed 265 Soldiers to Kuwait and Afghanistan in support of the 1st Theater Sustainment Command and operations in the US Central Command area of operations. The unit assumed responsibility for operational sustainment in the ARCENT AOR in October 2013 from the 135th Expeditionary Sustainment Command, and served as the senior operational sustainment headquarters in Kuwait until May 2014, when the unit redeployed, having transferred responsibility for operational sustainment to the 1st Sustainment Command (Theater).

== Organization ==
The command is a subordinate unit of the 377th Theater Sustainment Command. As of January 2026 the command consists of the following units:

- 143rd Expeditionary Sustainment Command, in Orlando (FL)
  - Headquarters and Headquarters Company, 143rd Expeditionary Sustainment Command, in Orlando (FL)
  - 333rd Quartermaster Detachment (Division Parachute Office) (Airborne), at Fort Bragg (NC)
  - 336th Financial Management Support Center, in Lake Charles (LA)
  - 207th Regional Support Group, at Fort Jackson (SC)
    - Headquarters and Headquarters Company, 207th Regional Support Group, at Fort Jackson (SC)
    - 362nd Quartermaster Battalion (Petroleum Support), in Winterville (NC)
      - Headquarters and Headquarters Detachment, 362nd Quartermaster Battalion (Petroleum Support), in Winterville (NC)
      - 216th Transportation Detachment (Movement Control Team), at Fort Bragg (NC)
      - 385th Transportation Detachment (Movement Control Team), at Fort Bragg (NC)
      - 431st Quartermaster Detachment (Tactical Water Distribution Team) (Hoseline), in Winterville (NC)
      - 565th Transportation Detachment (Movement Control Team), at Fort Bragg (NC)
      - 650th Transportation Company (Seaport Operations), in Wilmington (NC)
      - 849th Quartermaster Company (Supply), in Rocky Mount (NC)
        - 1st Platoon, 849th Quartermaster Company (Supply), in Winterville (NC)
      - 998th Quartermaster Company (Water Purification and Distribution), at Joint Base Charleston (SC)
    - 812th Transportation Battalion (Motor), in Charlotte (NC)
      - Headquarters and Headquarters Detachment, 812th Transportation Battalion (Motor), in Charlotte (NC)
      - 175th Ordnance Company (Support Maintenance), at Fort Jackson (SC)
      - 414th Transportation Medium Truck Company (POL, 5K GAL) (EAB Linehaul), in Orangeburg (SC)
      - 596th Transportation Detachment (Movement Control Team), at Joint Base Charleston (SC)
      - 846th Transportation Medium Truck Company (Cargo) (EAB Linehaul), in Salisbury (NC)
      - 941st Transportation Medium Truck Company (POL, 5K GAL) (EAB Linehaul), at Joint Base Charleston (SC)
      - 991st Transportation Medium Truck Company (PLS) (EAB Tactical), in Salisbury (NC)
        - Detachment 1, 991st Transportation Medium Truck Company (PLS) (EAB Tactical), in Kingsport (TN)
  - 518th Sustainment Brigade, in Knightdale (NC)
    - 518th Special Troops Battalion, in Knightdale (NC)
      - Headquarters and Headquarters Company, 518th Sustainment Brigade, in Knightdale (NC)
      - 492nd Brigade Signal Company (MEB/CAB/SB), in Knightdale (NC)
    - 275th Combat Sustainment Support Battalion, at Fort Lee (VA)
      - Headquarters and Headquarters Company, 275th Combat Sustainment Support Battalion, at Fort Lee (VA)
      - 351st Ordnance Company (Ammo) (Modular), in Romney (WV)
        - 1st Platoon, 351st Ordnance Company (Ammo) (Modular), in Morgantown (WV)
        - 2nd Platoon, 351st Ordnance Company (Ammo) (Modular), in Martinsburg (WV)
      - 375th Quartermaster Company (Field Feeding), in Wilson (NC)
      - 460th Quartermaster Company (Supply), in Suffolk (VA)
      - 678th Human Resources Company, in Nashville (TN)
        - 2nd Platoon, 678th Human Resources Company, in Charlotte (NC)
        - 3rd Platoon, 678th Human Resources Company, in Louisville (KY)
      - 812th Human Resources Company, in Charlotte (NC)
        - 3rd Platoon, 812th Human Resources Company, in Brevard (NC)
      - 824th Quartermaster Company (Corps Aerial Delivery) (Airborne), at Fort Bragg (NC)
      - 861st Quartermaster Company (Theater Aerial Delivery) (Airborne), in Nashville (TN)
      - 1006th Quartermaster Company (Supply), in Knightdale (NC)
    - 352nd Combat Sustainment Support Battalion, in Macon (GA)
      - Headquarters and Headquarters Company, 352nd Combat Sustainment Support Battalion, in Macon (GA)
      - 231st Transportation Company (Inland Cargo Transfer Company — ICTC), in Athens (GA)
      - 346th Quartermaster Company (Theater Aerial Delivery) (Airborne), at Joint Forces Training Base – Los Alamitos (CA)
      - 377th Quartermaster Company (Petroleum Support), in Macon (GA)
        - 2nd Platoon, 377th Quartermaster Company (Petroleum Support), in Tifton (GA)
        - 3rd Platoon, 377th Quartermaster Company (Petroleum Support), in Athens (GA)
      - 421st Quartermaster Company (Corps Aerial Delivery) (Airborne), in Fort Valley (GA)
      - 514th Transportation Detachment (Trailer Transfer Point Team), in Statham (GA)
      - 802nd Ordnance Company (Ammo) (Modular), in Gainesville (GA)
        - 1st Platoon, 802nd Ordnance Company (Ammo) (Modular), at Fort Gillem (GA)
        - 2nd Platoon, 802nd Ordnance Company (Ammo) (Modular), in Aiken (SC)
  - 641st Regional Support Group, in St. Petersburg (FL)
    - Headquarters and Headquarters Company, 641st Regional Support Group, in St. Petersburg (FL)
    - 257th Transportation Battalion (Movement Control), in Gainesville (FL)
      - Headquarters and Headquarters Detachment, 257th Transportation Battalion (Movement Control), in Gainesville (FL)
      - 146th Transportation Detachment (Movement Control Team), in Orlando (FL)
      - 196th Transportation Medium Truck Company (PLS) (EAB Tactical), in Orlando (FL)
      - 309th Transportation Detachment (Trailer Transfer Point Team), in Panama City (FL)
      - 399th Transportation Detachment (Movement Control Team), in Gainesville (FL)
      - 410th Quartermaster Detachment (Tactical Water Distribution Team) (Hoseline), in Jacksonville (FL)
      - 442nd Human Resources Company, in Tallahassee (FL)
        - 3rd Platoon, 442nd Human Resources Company, in Miami (FL)
      - 489th Transportation Company (Seaport Operations), in Jacksonville (FL)
      - 520th Transportation Detachment (Movement Control Team), in Orlando (FL)
      - 576th Transportation Detachment (Movement Control Team), in Panama City (FL)
      - 912th Human Resources Company, in Orlando (FL)
      - 993rd Transportation Medium Truck Company (PLS) (EAB Tactical), in Palatka (FL)
    - 332nd Transportation Battalion (Terminal), in Tampa (FL)
      - Headquarters and Headquarters Detachment, 332nd Transportation Battalion (Terminal), in Tampa (FL)
      - 94th Transportation Detachment (Movement Control Team), in Perrine (FL)
      - 451st Quartermaster Company (Supply), in Cape Coral (FL)
      - 528th Transportation Detachment (Movement Control Team), in Perrine (FL)
      - 558th Transportation Detachment (Movement Control Team), in Tampa (FL)
      - 623rd Transportation Company (Inland Cargo Transfer Company — ICTC), in Lake Park (FL)
      - 767th Quartermaster Detachment (Field Feeding Team), in Tampa (FL)
      - 768th Quartermaster Detachment (Field Feeding Team), in Tampa (FL)
      - 769th Quartermaster Detachment (Field Feeding Team), in Tampa (FL)
      - 839th Transportation Detachment (Movement Control Team), in Perrine (FL)
      - 873rd Quartermaster Company (Supply), in Lake Park (FL)
  - 642nd Regional Support Group, in Decatur (GA)
    - Headquarters and Headquarters Company, 642nd Regional Support Group, in Decatur (GA)
    - 787th Combat Sustainment Support Battalion, in Dothan (AL)
      - Headquarters and Headquarters Company, 787th Combat Sustainment Support Battalion, in Dothan (AL)
      - 228th Transportation Medium Truck Company (PLS) (EAB Tactical), in Statham (GA)
      - 282nd Quartermaster Company (Supply), in Jasper (AL)
        - 2nd Platoon, 282nd Quartermaster Company (Supply), in Montgomery (AL)
      - 461st Human Resources Company, in Decatur (GA)
      - 803rd Quartermaster Company (Supply), in Opelika (AL)
        - 1st Platoon, 803rd Quartermaster Company (Supply), in Dublin (GA)
      - 809th Human Resources Company, in Mobile (AL)
        - 1st Platoon, 809th Human Resources Company, in Athens (GA)
        - 2nd Platoon, 809th Human Resources Company, in Rome (GA)
        - 3rd Platoon, 809th Human Resources Company, in Starkville (MS)
        - 4th Platoon, 809th Human Resources Company, in Mobile (AL)
        - 5th Platoon, 809th Human Resources Company, in Myrtle Beach (SC)
      - 939th Transportation Company (Inland Cargo Transfer Company — ICTC), in Statham (GA)
      - 1015th Ordnance Company (Support Maintenance), at Fort Gillem (GA)
    - 828th Transportation Battalion (Motor), in Livingston (AL)
      - Headquarters and Headquarters Detachment, 828th Transportation Battalion (Motor), in Livingston (AL)
      - 206th Transportation Medium Truck Company (Cargo) (EAB Linehaul), in Opelika (AL)
        - Detachment 1, 206th Transportation Medium Truck Company (Cargo) (EAB Linehaul), in Montgomery (AL)
      - 287th Transportation Company (Combat HET), in Livingston (AL)
        - Detachment 1, 287th Transportation Company (Combat HET), at Fort McClellan (AL)
      - 319th Transportation Medium Truck Company (POL, 5K GAL) (EAB Linehaul), in Augusta (GA)
        - Detachment 1, 319th Transportation Medium Truck Company (POL, 5K GAL) (EAB Linehaul), in Savannah (GA)
      - 441st Transportation Company (Seaport Operations), in New Orleans (LA)
      - 814th Personnel Detachment (Theater Gateway — Personnel Accountability Team), in Starkville (MS)

Abbreviations: PLS — Palletized Load System; HET — Heavy Equipment Transporter; POL — Petroleum Oil Lubricants; EAB — Echelon Above Brigade

== Lineage ==
- Constituted 24 November 1967 in the Army Reserve as Headquarters and Headquarters Company, 143d Transportation Brigade.
- Activated 2 January 1968 at Orlando, Florida
- Reorganized and redesignated 16 October 1985 as Headquarters and Headquarters Company, 143d Transportation Command
- (Elements ordered into active military service 2003–2007 in support of the War on Terrorism)
- Converted, reorganized, and redesignated 17 September 2007 as Headquarters and Headquarters Company, 143d Sustainment Command
- Ordered into active military service 9 January 2009 at Orlando, Florida; released from active military service 12 February 2010 and reverted to reserve status
- Ordered into active military service 14 June 2013 at Orlando, Florida; released from active military service 15 June 2014 and reverted to reserve status

== Unit insignia ==
=== Shoulder sleeve insignia (SSI) ===
==== Description ====
On a brick red upright rectangle with a 1/8 inch (0.32 cm) brick red border 3 inches (7.6 cm) in height and 2 inches (5.1 cm) in width overall, two golden yellow ribbands lined white with an arrowhead at each end interlaced and reversed at a 90-degree angle, fimbriated brick red.

==== Symbolism ====
Brick red and golden yellow are the colors used for Transportation units, the previous designation of the unit. The interlacing represents a strong support and simulates roads and viaducts, suggesting travel. The arrowheads denote leadership and a determined direction.

==== Background ====
The shoulder sleeve insignia was originally approved 24 October 1968 for the 143d Transportation Brigade. It was redesignated for the 143d Transportation Command on 16 October 1985, and amended to revise the description and symbolism. The insignia was redesignated effective 17 September 2007, for the 143d Sustainment Command with the description and symbolism updated.

=== Distinctive unit insignia (DUI) ===
==== Description ====
A gold color metal and enamel device 1 1/8 inches (2.9 cm) in height overall consisting of an upright winged gold arrow with wings down, surmounted by a brick red annulet inscribed in the upper arc, "MOVEMENT" and on the lower "BRINGS VICTORY" in gold letters, the area within the annulet green.

==== Symbolism ====
Brick red and golden yellow (gold) are the colors used for Transportation, the previous designation of the unit and green is basic for "all traffic forward." The annulet simulates both a wheel, alluding to motor transport, and an enclosure, symbolizing a terminal. The arrow, a sign of direction, denotes controlled determination, and is used to represent the implements and armaments of warfare, while the wings relate to the unit's air transport aspects and symbolizes the speed in the organization's operations.

==== Background ====
The distinctive unit insignia was originally approved for the 143d Transportation Brigade on 13 January 1969. It was redesignated for the 143d Transportation Command on 16 October 1985 and amended to revise the description. The insignia was redesignated effective 17 September 2007, for the 143d Sustainment Command with the description and symbolism updated.

== Unit honors ==
- Meritorious Unit Commendation, Streamer Embroidered SOUTHWEST ASIA 2004-2005
- Meritorious Unit Commendation, Streamer Embroidered SOUTHWEST ASIA 2009-2010
- Meritorious Unit Commendation, Streamer Embroidered SOUTHWEST ASIA 2013-2014
