= 4th Expeditionary Sustainment Command =

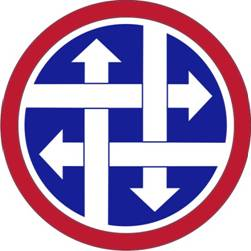
- Shoulder sleeve insignia
- Active: 16 Jan 1952 - 20 Jan 1954; 15 Jun 1958 - 23 Jun 1967; 21 Dec 1975 - 15 Sep 2007; 16 Oct 2008 - Present
- Country: United States
- Branch: United States Army Reserve
- Role: Sustainment
- Part of: 377th Theater Sustainment Command
- Garrison/HQ: San Antonio, Texas
- Battle honours: Operation Enduring Freedom

Commanders
- Current commander: Brigadier General Tomika M. Seaberry
- Notable commanders: Brigadier General Kevin F. Meisler, Major General Susan E. Henderson, Major General Luis R. Visot, Major General Les J. Carroll, Brigadier General Norman B. Green

Insignia
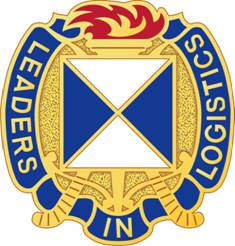
- 4th Sustainment Command DUI

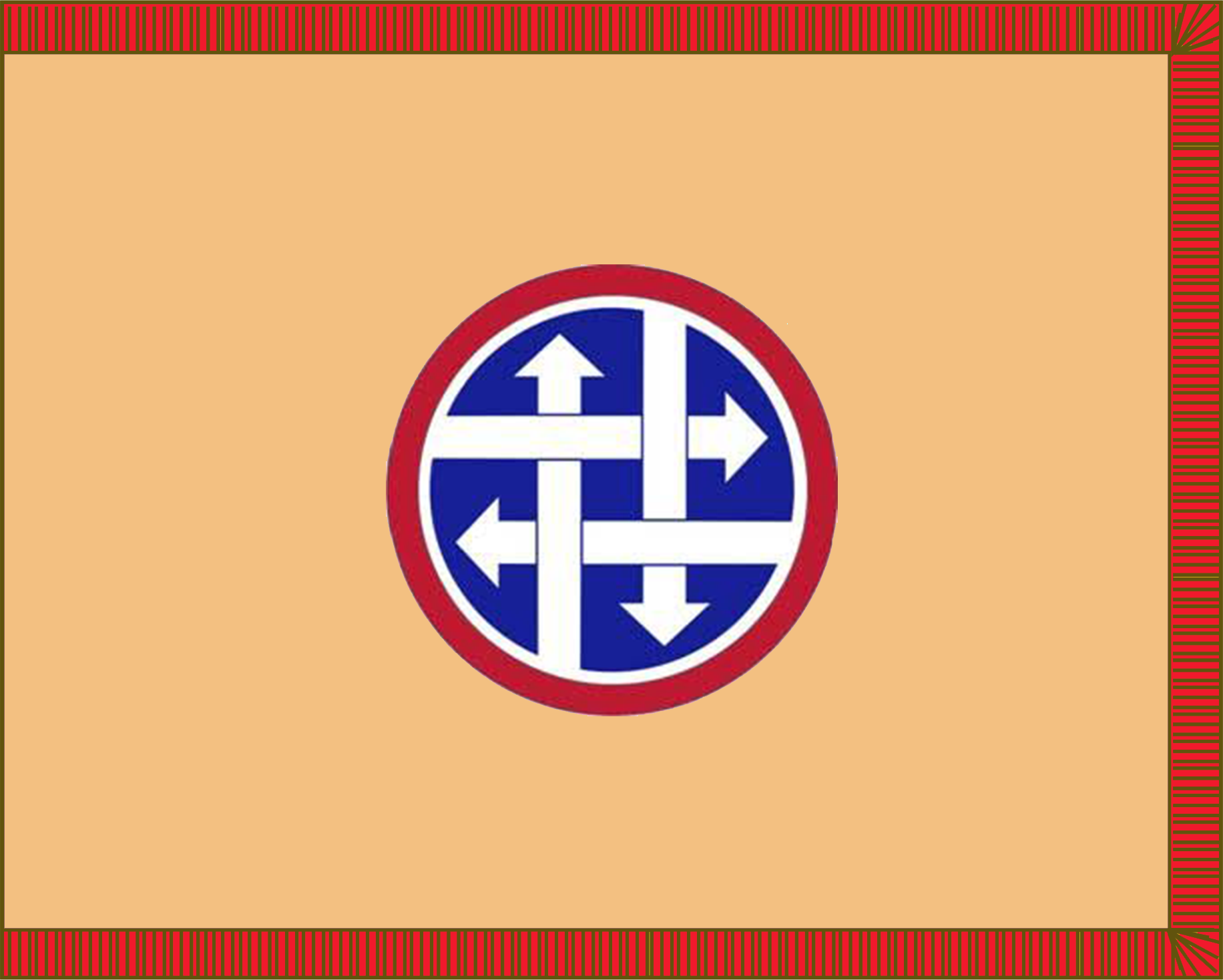
- 4th Sustainment Command Flag

The 4th Expeditionary Sustainment Command (4th ESC) is a subordinate command of 377th Theater Sustainment Command. The 4th ESC is located in San Antonio, Texas. The command comprises 54 subordinate units and has command and control of more than 6,500 Army Reserve soldiers throughout Texas, Oklahoma, Arkansas, and New Mexico. The 4th ESC provides trained and ready forces in support of global contingency operations. On order, the 4th ESC is prepared to deploy and provide command and control to all assigned, attached, and operationally controlled units and will provide sustainment planning, guidance and support to forces in the area of operations.

In 2011, the USAR described the command's mission as to: "Function.. as an operational command post for a Theater Sustainment Command (TSC), providing operational-level sustainment support. Leads, plans, coordinates, synchronizes, monitors, and controls operational-level logistics within an assigned area of operations."

== History ==
The 4th ESC has over fifty years of history. The journey began when the unit was constituted on 16 January 1952 as the 4th Logistical Command in the Regular Army as Headquarters and Headquarters Company, 4th Logistical Command. The unit was activated 10 February 1952 at Leghorn, Italy. The command was probably intended to support U.S. Forces in Austria (see Allied-occupied Austria). It was inactivated 20 January 1954 also at Leghorn.

Activated 15 June 1958 in France. Headquarters 4th Logistical Command reorganized and redesignated 24 June 1961 as Headquarters and Headquarters Company, 4th Logistical Command (original Headquarters Company concurrently disbanded).

On 7 May 1964, it was reorganized and redesignated as Headquarters and Headquarters Detachment, 4th Logistical Command, and then was reorganized and redesignated on 24 June 1964 as Headquarters and Headquarters Company, 4th Logistical Command. It later inactivated on 23 June 1967 at Fort Lee, Virginia.

On 21 December 1975, the unit was redesignated as the 4th Support Center and activated at Fort Hood, Texas.

On 1 March 1989, it was redesignated as the 4th Material Management Center Corps Support Command.

On 1 October 2000, it was reorganized and redesignated as the 4th Support Center. The 4th Support Center was inactivated 15 September 2007 at Fort Hood, Texas.

On 29 November 2007, the unit was withdrawn from the Regular Army and allotted to the Army Reserve.

Redesignated 16 October 2008 as Headquarters and Headquarters Company, 4th Sustainment Command, it was activated at San Antonio, Texas.

The 4th ESC mobilized in the spring of 2011, to provide combat service support for forces during the War in Afghanistan (2001-2021). On 25 July 2011, the unit formally conducted a Transfer of Authority for Joint Sustainment Command - Afghanistan from the 184th Expeditionary Sustainment Command.

== Organization ==
The command is a subordinate unit of the 377th Theater Sustainment Command. As of January 2026 the command consists of the following units:

- 4th Expeditionary Sustainment Command, at Joint Base San Antonio (TX)
  - Headquarters and Headquarters Company, 4th Expeditionary Sustainment Command, at Joint Base San Antonio (TX)
  - 77th Quartermaster Group (Petroleum Support), at Fort Bliss (TX)
    - Headquarters and Headquarters Company, 77th Quartermaster Group (Petroleum Support), at Fort Bliss (TX)
    - 372nd Quartermaster Battalion (Petroleum Support), at Kirtland Air Force Base (NM)
      - Headquarters and Headquarters Detachment, 372nd Quartermaster Battalion (Petroleum Support), at Kirtland Air Force Base (NM)
      - 510th Transportation Detachment (Movement Control Team), in Santa Fe (NM)
      - 601st Transportation Detachment (Trailer Transfer Point Team), in Santa Fe (NM)
      - 809th Quartermaster Detachment (Petroleum Liaison Team), at Kirtland Air Force Base (NM)
      - 877th Quartermaster Company (Petroleum Support), at Kirtland Air Force Base (NM)
      - 974th Quartermaster Company (Field Service) (Modular), in Amarillo (TX)
    - 383rd Quartermaster Battalion (Petroleum Support), at Fort Bliss (TX)
      - Headquarters and Headquarters Company, 383rd Quartermaster Battalion (Petroleum Support), at Fort Bliss (TX)
      - 172nd Transportation Medium Truck Company (POL, 5K GAL) (EAB Linehaul), at Fort Bliss (TX)
      - 263rd Quartermaster Company (Field Service) (Modular), at Fort Bliss (TX)
      - 356th Transportation Medium Truck Company (PLS) (EAB Tactical), in Las Cruces (NM)
      - 602nd Transportation Detachment (Movement Control Team), in Las Cruces (NM)
      - 900th Quartermaster Company (Petroleum Support), at Fort Bliss (TX)
      - 985th Quartermaster Detachment (Tactical Water Distribution Team) (Hoseline), in Las Cruces (NM)
  - 90th Sustainment Brigade, at Camp Robinson (AR)
    - 90th Special Troops Battalion, at Camp Robinson (AR)
      - Headquarters and Headquarters Company, 90th Sustainment Brigade, at Camp Robinson (AR)
    - 316th Quartermaster Battalion (Petroleum Support), in Okmulgee (OK)
      - Headquarters and Headquarters Detachment, 316th Quartermaster Battalion (Petroleum Support), in Okmulgee (OK)
      - 315th Quartermaster Detachment (Petroleum Liaison Team), in Broken Arrow (OK)
      - 327th Transportation Detachment (Movement Control Team), in Stillwater (OK)
      - 481st Transportation Detachment (Movement Control Team), in Bartlesville (OK)
      - 589th Transportation Detachment (Movement Control Team), at Fort Sill (OK)
      - 801st Human Resources Company, in Tulsa (OK)
        - 1st Platoon, 801st Human Resources Company, at Red River Army Depot (TX)
      - 883rd Quartermaster Company (Petroleum Support), in Broken Arrow (OK)
      - 910th Quartermaster Company (Petroleum Support), in Ardmore (OK)
        - 1st Platoon, 910th Quartermaster Company (Petroleum Support), in Ada (OK)
        - 2nd Platoon, 910th Quartermaster Company (Petroleum Support), at Fort Sill (OK)
    - 348th Transportation Battalion (Terminal), in Houston (TX)
      - Headquarters and Headquarters Detachment, 348th Transportation Battalion (Terminal), in Houston (TX)
      - 217th Transportation Company (Combat HET), at Joint Base San Antonio (TX)
      - 388th Transportation Detachment (Movement Control Team), in Houston (TX)
      - 453rd Transportation Company (Inland Cargo Transfer Company — ICTC), in Sinton (TX)
      - 499th Transportation Detachment (Movement Control Team), in Houston (TX)
      - 644th Transportation Medium Truck Company (PLS) (EAB Tactical), in Houston (TX)
  - 211th Regional Support Group, in Corpus Christi (TX)
    - Headquarters and Headquarters Company, 211th Regional Support Group, in Corpus Christi (TX)
    - 319th Combat Sustainment Support Battalion, in Harlingen (TX)
      - Headquarters and Headquarters Company, 319th Combat Sustainment Support Battalion, in Harlingen (TX)
      - 370th Transportation Medium Truck Company (PLS) (EAB Tactical), in Brownsville (TX)
      - 519th Transportation Detachment (Trailer Transfer Point Team), in McAllen (TX)
      - 554th Transportation Detachment (Movement Control Team), in McAllen (TX)
      - 812th Quartermaster Company (Supply), in Kingsville (TX)
      - 851st Transportation Medium Truck Company (PLS) (EAB Tactical), in Sinton (TX)
      - 961st Quartermaster Company (Water Purification and Distribution), in McAllen (TX)
      - 971st Quartermaster Detachment (Tactical Water Distribution Team) (Hoseline), in McAllen (TX)
    - 373rd Combat Sustainment Support Battalion, in Beaumont (TX)
      - Headquarters and Headquarters Company, 373rd Combat Sustainment Support Battalion, in Beaumont (TX)
      - 79th Quartermaster Company (Supply), in Houston (TX)
      - 103rd Quartermaster Company (Supply), in Houston (TX)
      - 288th Quartermaster Company (Water Purification and Distribution), in Victoria (TX)
      - 1002nd Quartermaster Company (Petroleum Pipeline and Terminal Operation), in Beaumont (TX)
        - Detachment 1, 1002nd Quartermaster Company (Petroleum Pipeline and Terminal Operation), at Ellington Field Joint Reserve Base (TX)
  - 300th Sustainment Brigade, in Grand Prairie (TX)
    - 300th Special Troops Battalion, in Grand Prairie (TX)
      - Headquarters and Headquarters Company, 300th Sustainment Brigade, in Grand Prairie (TX)
      - 358th Brigade Signal Company (MEB/CAB/SB), in Round Rock (TX)
    - 363rd Quartermaster Battalion (Petroleum Support), in San Marcos (TX)
      - Headquarters and Headquarters Detachment, 363rd Quartermaster Battalion (Petroleum Support), in San Marcos (TX)
      - 141st Quartermaster Company (Petroleum Pipeline and Terminal Operation), in Tyler (TX)
      - 223rd Ordnance Company (Support Maintenance), in Grand Prairie (TX)
      - 320th Quartermaster Detachment (Petroleum Liaison Team), in Fort Worth (TX)
      - 328th Human Resources Company, in San Antonio (TX)
        - Detachment 1, 328th Human Resources Company, at Joint Base San Antonio (TX)
        - Detachment 2, 328th Human Resources Company, in Tulsa (OK)
      - 340th Quartermaster Company (Field Service) (Modular), at Joint Base San Antonio (TX)
      - 343rd Transportation Detachment (Movement Control Team), in Round Rock (TX)
      - 350th Personnel Company (Postal), in Grand Prairie (TX)
      - 411th Quartermaster Detachment (Theater Petroleum Laboratory Team), in Grand Prairie (TX)
      - 645th Quartermaster Detachment (Petroleum Liaison Team), in San Marcos (TX)
      - 957th Quartermaster Company (Petroleum Support), in Denton (TX)

Abbreviations: PLS — Palletized Load System; HET — Heavy Equipment Transporter; POL — Petroleum Oil Lubricants; EAB — Echelon Above Brigade
