= 311th Expeditionary Sustainment Command =

United States Army Reserve sustainment command headquartered in Los Angeles

- Shoulder sleeve insignia
- Active: 1950 - present
- Country: United States
- Branch: United States Army Reserve
- Type: Sustainment command
- Role: Theater and operational sustainment
- Size: Command
- Part of: 79th Theater Sustainment Command
- Headquarters: Los Angeles, California
- Mottos: Provide, Maintain, Sustain
- Branch colors: Buff Gold Scarlet

Commanders
- Commanding general: BG Earl C. "Chip" Sparks IV
- Command Sergeant Major: CSM Kristy L. Hawkins

Insignia
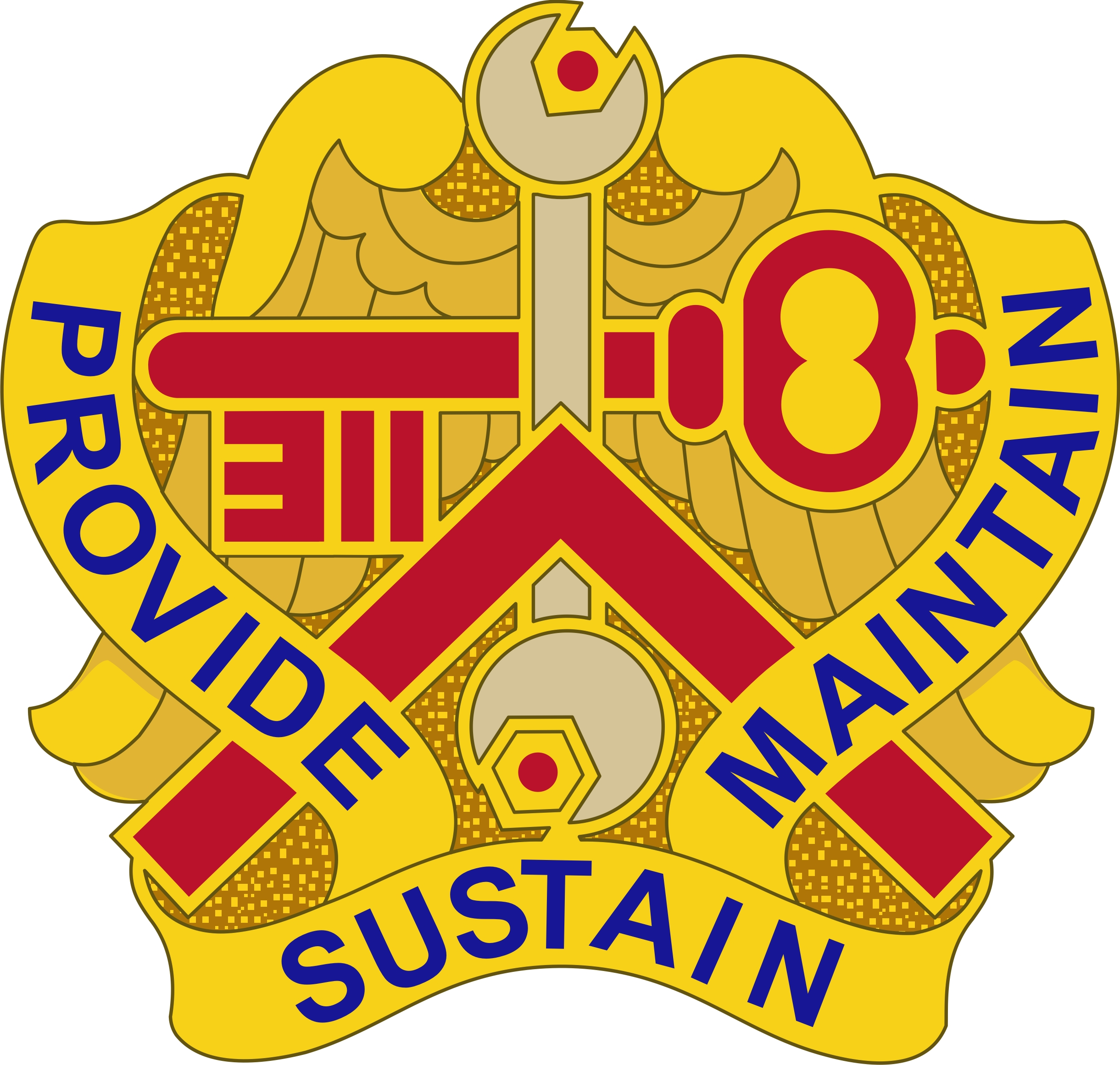
- Distinctive unit insignia

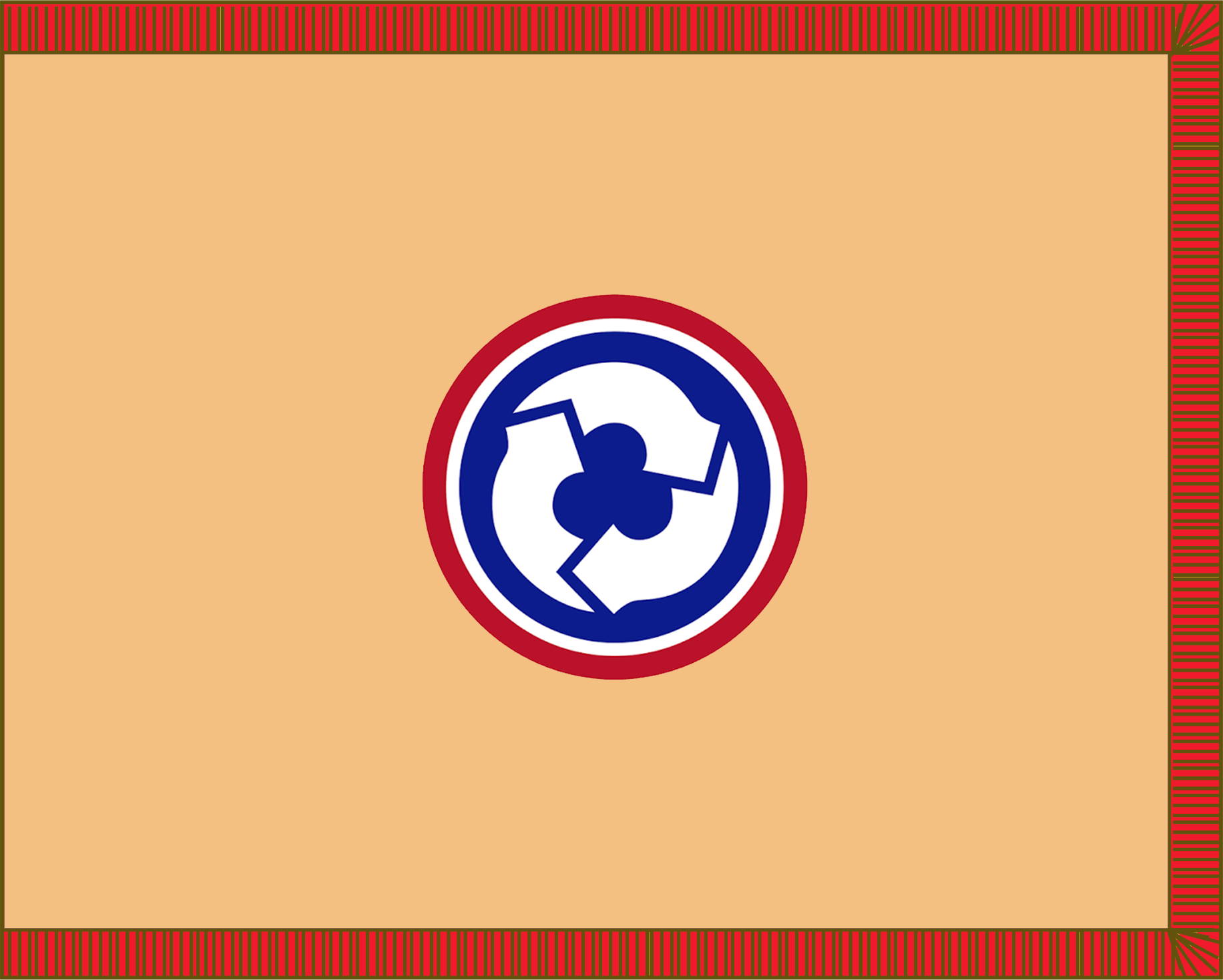
- 311th Sustainment Command Flag

The 311th Expeditionary Sustainment Command (311 ESC) is a United States Army Reserve logistics headquarters subordinate to the 79th Theater Sustainment Command. Headquartered at 1250 Federal Avenue in Los Angeles, the command oversees about sixty two subordinate units and more than six thousand one hundred soldiers across Arizona, California, and Nevada.

== History ==
The headquarters traces its origin to the post World War II period, when the Army chose Los Angeles as the site for a new logistics unit to leverage a large pool of qualified Army Reserve personnel. The unit was activated in 1950 as the 311th Logistical Command. It was redesignated the 311th Support Brigade in 1974 and the 311th Corps Support Command in 1979. In 1981 it became the major support headquarters for I Corps. In 2005, as part of the Army modular transformation, it received its current designation as the 311th Expeditionary Sustainment Command.

The command has supported named operations including Operation Desert Shield and Operation Desert Storm, and Joint Endeavor in the Balkans. With I Corps, it participated in exercises such as Bold Venture, Cascade Peak, Team Spirit, Yama Sakura, and Border Start.

During the global war on terror era, the 311th deployed to Southwest Asia. The command operated from Camp Arifjan, Kuwait during 2008 to 2009 in support of theater sustainment for Operation Iraqi Freedom and Operation Enduring Freedom.

Elements of the command also served in Afghanistan, including duty associated with theater sustainment at Kandahar Airfield during the early twenty tens.

Most recently, the headquarters deployed to Kuwait in 2020 and 2021 in support of Operation Spartan Shield, with missions also tied to Operation Inherent Resolve and Operation Freedom’s Sentinel. The unit returned in January 2021.

== Mission ==
The 311th commands and controls sustainment units to provide operational and tactical level support, including distribution management, in coordination with a theater sustainment command. On order, it can deploy globally to conduct combat service support operations.

== Lineage ==
- 1950: Activated in the Army Reserve as the 311th Logistical Command in Los Angeles.
- 1974: Redesignated as the 311th Support Brigade.
- 1979: Redesignated as the 311th Corps Support Command (COSCOM).
- 1981: Became the major support headquarters for I Corps.
- 1990 to 1991: Supported Operation Desert Shield and Operation Desert Storm.
- 2005: Redesignated as the 311th Expeditionary Sustainment Command as part of the Army modular transformation.
- 2008 to 2009: Deployed to Camp Arifjan, Kuwait, supporting theater sustainment for Operation Iraqi Freedom and Operation Enduring Freedom.
- 2012 to 2013: Headquarters and Headquarters Company deployed to Afghanistan during the Transition I campaign phase.
- 2020 to 2021: Deployed to Kuwait in support of Operation Spartan Shield, with missions tied to Operation Inherent Resolve and Operation Freedom’s Sentinel; returned in January 2021.

== Organization ==
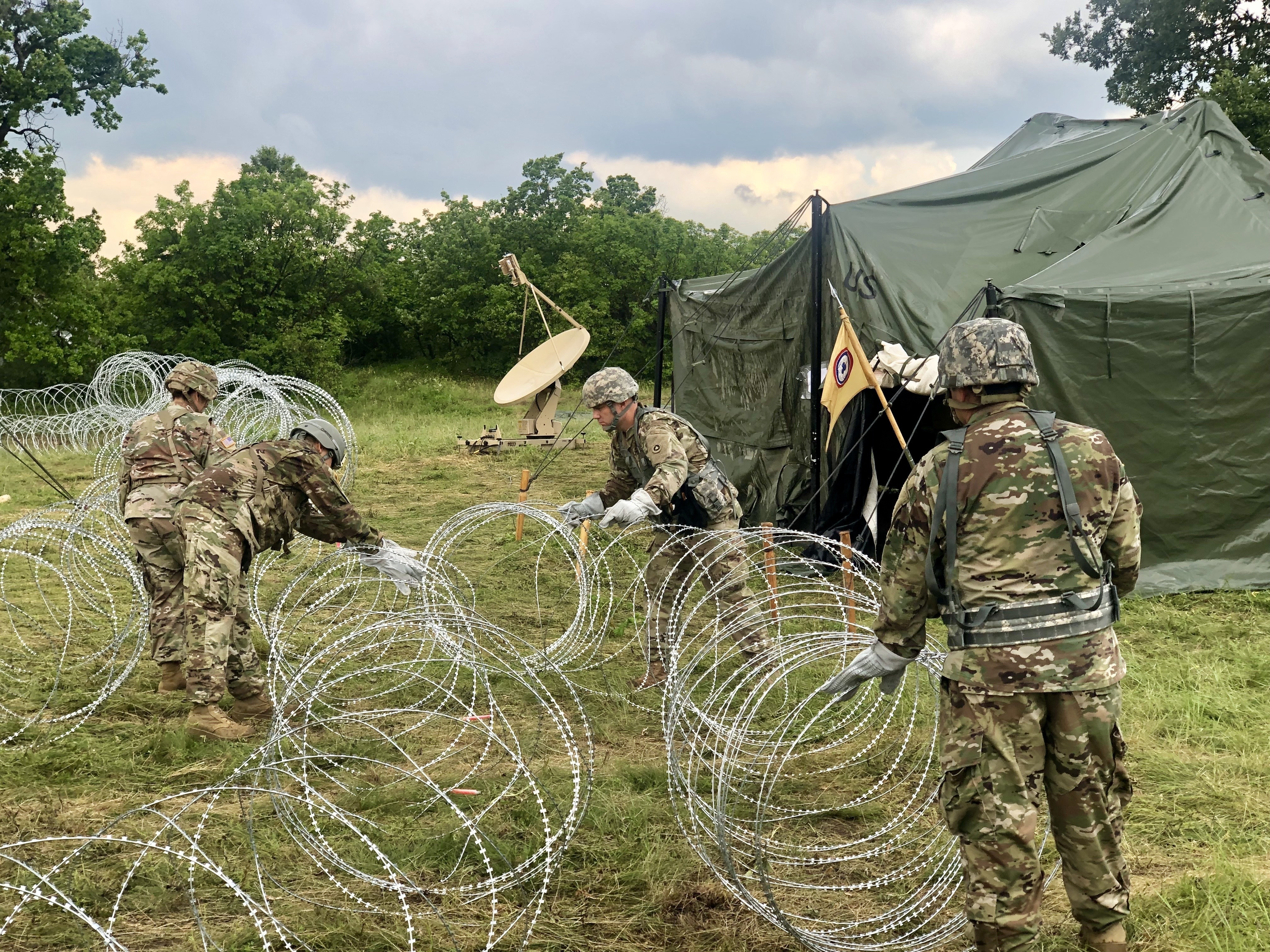
Soldiers of the 311th Expeditionary Sustainment Command during 2019 annual training

The 311th Expeditionary Sustainment Command is a subordinate unit of the 79th Theater Sustainment Command. As of January 2026 the command consists of the following units:

- 311th Expeditionary Sustainment Command, in Los Angeles (CA)
  - Headquarters and Headquarters Company, 311th Expeditionary Sustainment Command, in Los Angeles (CA)
  - 326th Financial Management Support Center, in Los Angeles (CA)
  - 304th Sustainment Brigade, at March Air Reserve Base (CA)
    - 304th Special Troops Battalion, at March Air Reserve Base (CA)
      - Headquarters and Headquarters Company, 304th Sustainment Brigade, at March Air Reserve Base (CA)
      - 397th Brigade Signal Company (MEB/CAB/SB), at March Air Reserve Base (CA)
    - 155th Combat Sustainment Support Battalion, in South El Monte (CA)
      - Headquarters and Headquarters Company, 155th Combat Sustainment Support Battalion, in South El Monte (CA)
      - 137th Quartermaster Company (Field Service) (Modular), in South El Monte (CA)
      - 250th Transportation Medium Truck Company (Cargo) (EAB Linehaul), in South El Monte (CA)
      - 250th Quartermaster Company (Water Purification and Distribution), in Los Angeles (CA)
      - 312th Human Resources Company, in San Diego (CA)
        - 3rd Platoon (Postal), 312th Human Resources Company, in Mesa (AZ)
      - 387th Quartermaster Company (Mortuary Affairs), in Costa Mesa (CA)
      - 555th Transportation Detachment (Movement Control Team), in South El Monte (CA)
    - 371st Combat Sustainment Support Battalion, at March Air Reserve Base (CA)
      - Headquarters and Headquarters Company, 371st Combat Sustainment Support Battalion, at March Air Reserve Base (CA)
      - 63rd Human Resources Company, at March Air Reserve Base (CA)
        - 1st Platoon (Postal), 63rd Human Resources Company, in Bell (CA)
      - 304th Transportation Detachment (Movement Control Team), at March Air Reserve Base (CA)
      - 329th Quartermaster Company (Petroleum Pipeline and Terminal Operation), at March Air Reserve Base (CA)
      - 376th Human Resources Company, in Bell (CA)
        - 5th Platoon, 376th Human Resources Company, in Sherman Oaks (CA)
      - 693rd Quartermaster Company (Supply), in Bell (CA)
      - 806th Adjutant General Detachment (Military Mail Terminal), at March Air Reserve Base (CA)
      - 950th Ordnance Company (Support Maintenance), at March Air Reserve Base (CA)
    - 420th Transportation Battalion (Movement Control), in Sherman Oaks (CA)
      - Headquarters and Headquarters Detachment, 420th Transportation Battalion (Movement Control), in Sherman Oaks (CA)
      - 211th Transportation Company (Inland Cargo Transfer Company — ICTC), in Garden Grove (CA)
      - 566th Transportation Detachment (Movement Control Team), in Bell (CA)
      - 570th Transportation Detachment (Movement Control Team), in Sherman Oaks (CA)
      - 650th Transportation Detachment (Movement Control Team), in El Monte (CA)
      - 730th Transportation Medium Truck Company (PLS) (EAB Tactical), in Bell (CA)
      - 975th Transportation Detachment (Movement Control Team), at Garden Grove (CA)
  - 650th Regional Support Group, in Sloan (NV)
    - Headquarters and Headquarters Company, 650th Regional Support Group, in Sloan (NV)
    - 314th Combat Sustainment Support Battalion, in Sloan (NV)
      - Headquarters and Headquarters Company, 314th Combat Sustainment Support Battalion, in Sloan (NV)
      - 257th Transportation Company (Combat HET), at Nellis Air Force Base (NV)
        - Detachment 1, 257th Transportation Company (Combat HET), in Red Rock (AZ)
      - 306th Quartermaster Company (Petroleum Support), in Sloan (NV)
      - 645th Transportation Company (Inland Cargo Transfer Company — ICTC), in Sloan (NV)
      - 948th Transportation Detachment (Movement Control Team), at Nellis Air Force Base (NV)
      - 957th Transportation Detachment (Movement Control Team), at Nellis Air Force Base (NV)
    - 469th Combat Sustainment Support Battalion, in Mountain View (CA)
      - Headquarters and Headquarters Company, 469th Combat Sustainment Support Battalion, in Mountain View (CA)
      - 227th Transportation Company (Inland Cargo Transfer Company — ICTC), in Sacramento (CA)
      - 330th Transportation Detachment (Movement Control Team), in Fresno (CA)
      - 728th Transportation Medium Truck Company (PLS) (EAB Tactical), in Vallejo (CA)
      - 729th Transportation Medium Truck Company (Cargo) (EAB Linehaul), in Fresno (CA)
        - Detachment 1, 729th Transportation Medium Truck Company (Cargo) (EAB Linehaul), in Bakersfield (CA)
  - 653rd Regional Support Group, in Mesa (AZ)
    - Headquarters and Headquarters Company, 653rd Regional Support Group, in Mesa (AZ)
    - 336th Combat Sustainment Support Battalion, in Buckeye (AZ)
      - Headquarters and Headquarters Company, 336th Combat Sustainment Support Battalion, in Buckeye (AZ)
      - 348th Transportation Medium Truck Company (POL, 5K GAL) (EAB Linehaul), in Buckeye (AZ)
      - 452nd Quartermaster Company (Field Service) (Modular), in Scottsdale (AZ)
      - 974th Transportation Detachment (Movement Control Team), in Buckeye (AZ)
    - 418th Quartermaster Battalion (Petroleum Support), in Red Rock (AZ)
      - Headquarters and Headquarters Detachment, 418th Quartermaster Battalion (Petroleum Support), in Red Rock (AZ)
      - 208th Transportation Medium Truck Company (PLS) (EAB Tactical), in Red Rock (AZ)
      - 331st Transportation Detachment (Movement Control Team), in Red Rock (AZ)
      - 655th Quartermaster Detachment (Petroleum Liaison Team), in Red Rock (AZ)
    - 419th Combat Sustainment Support Battalion, in Tustin (CA)
      - Headquarters and Headquarters Company, 419th Combat Sustainment Support Battalion, in Tustin (CA)
      - 163rd Ordnance Company (Ammo) (Modular), in Tustin (CA)
      - 340th Transportation Detachment (Movement Control Team), at Camp Pendleton (CA)
      - 478th Transportation Medium Truck Company (PLS) (EAB Tactical), at Camp Pendleton (CA)
      - 968th Quartermaster Company (Water Purification and Distribution), in Tustin (CA)
      - 1017th Quartermaster Company (Petroleum Support), at Camp Pendleton (CA)

Abbreviations: PLS — Palletized Load System; HET — Heavy Equipment Transporter; POL — Petroleum Oil Lubricants; EAB — Echelon Above Brigade

== Insignia ==
Shoulder sleeve insignia, 311th ESC

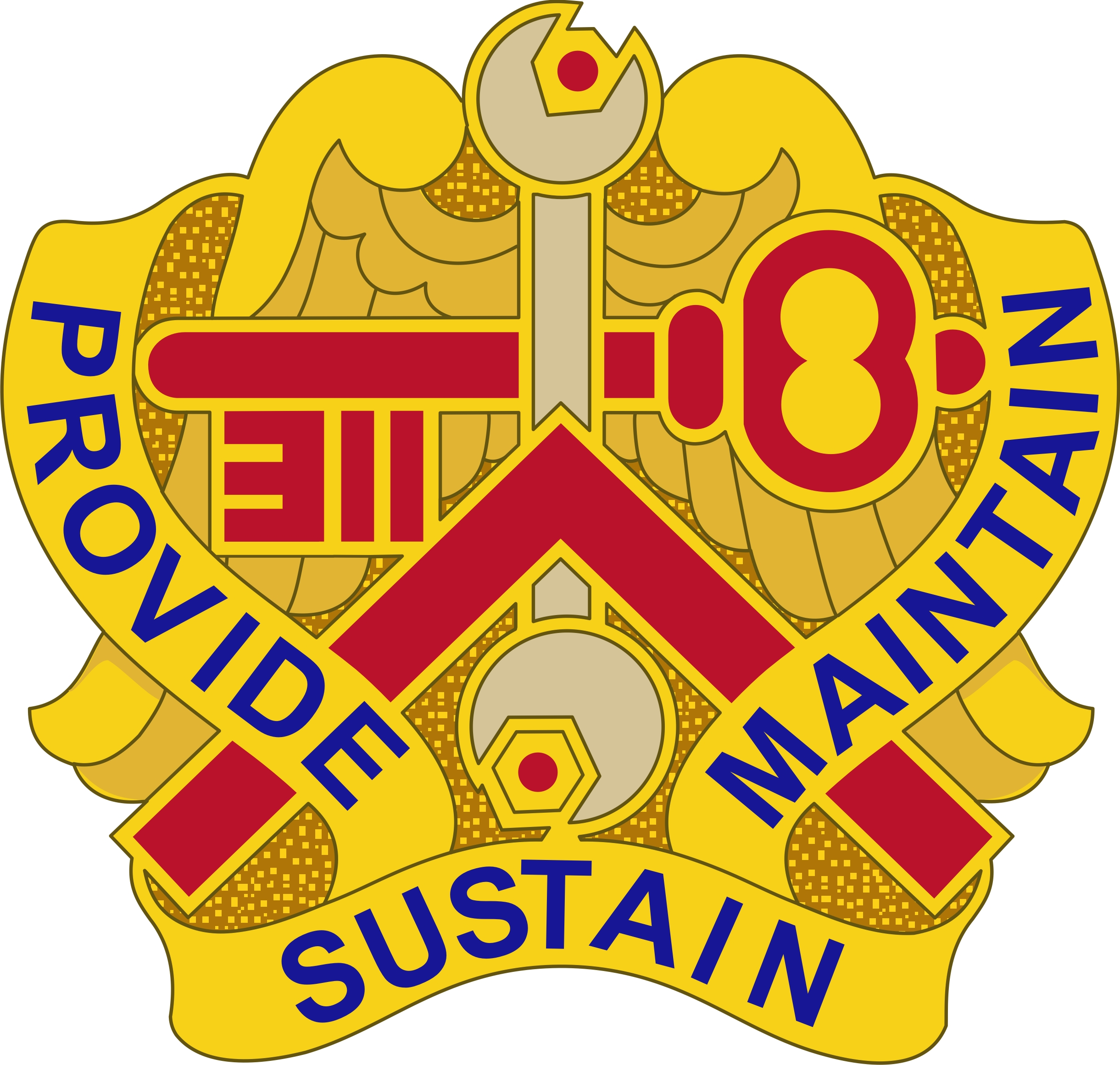
Distinctive unit insignia, 311th ESC

The shoulder sleeve insignia (SSI) for the 311th was originally approved for the 311th Logistical Command on 22 March 1955. It was redesignated for the 311th Support Brigade on 19 December 1974; for the 311th Corps Support Command on 16 May 1979; and for the 311th Expeditionary Sustainment Command on 17 March 2006.

The insignia consists of three interlaced arrows which symbolize the unit’s mission to provide support in the fields of transportation, quartering, and supply. The arrows also represent strength through unity and the broad logistical functions of the command.

The distinctive unit insignia (DUI) was originally approved for the 311th Support Brigade on 4 November 1970. It was redesignated for the 311th Corps Support Command on 16 May 1979, and again redesignated for the 311th Expeditionary Sustainment Command on 17 March 2006.

The design incorporates a chevron, wrench, and wings which together symbolize the command’s motto: "Provide, Maintain, Sustain." The chevron stands for support, the wrench for maintenance, and the wings represent Los Angeles — the "City of Angels" — where the command is headquartered. Scarlet and buff are the branch colors of the sustainment and logistics corps.

== Command team ==
As of 2025 the commanding general is Brigadier General Earl C. "Chip" Sparks IV and the command sergeant major is Command Sergeant Major Kristy L. Hawkins. Former commanders include Brigadier General Dianne Del Rosso and Brigadier General John M. Dreska, who conducted a change of command on 11 April 2021 in Los Angeles.

== Recent activities ==
The command continues to support theater sustainment tasks and large scale training. In 2025 it participated in Operation Mojave Falcon events at Fort Hunter Liggett and conducted a G8 Road to Budget circulation across the formation.

== Decorations ==
Ribbon	Award	Streamer	Streamer embroidered
	Meritorious Unit Commendation (Army)		AFGHANISTAN 2012–2013
	Meritorious Unit Commendation (Army)		OPERATION ALLIES REFUGE / OPERATION ALLIES WELCOME 2021–2022

== Campaign Participation Credit ==
Campaign	Streamer	Description
Afghanistan Campaign		Awarded for participation in the Transition I campaign phase, 2012–2013.
Global War on Terrorism		Authorized for service in support of post–11 September operations worldwide.

== See also ==
- 79th Theater Sustainment Command
- I Corps
