= 653rd Regional Support Group =

- Shoulder sleeve insignia
- Active: 1999–present
- Country: United States
- Allegiance: US Army Reserve
- Branch: United States Army
- Type: Support Group
- Role: Large-Scale Deployment Operation (LSDO)
- Size: Brigade
- Part of: 311th Sustainment Command (Expeditionary)
- Headquarters: Mesa, Arizona
- Mottos: Integrity and Determination
- Colors: Buff Gold Scarlet

Commanders
- Commander: COL Paul Brittain
- Command Sergeant Major: CSM Luis Rodriguez

Insignia
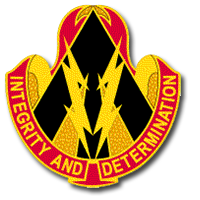
- 653rd Regional Support Group DUI

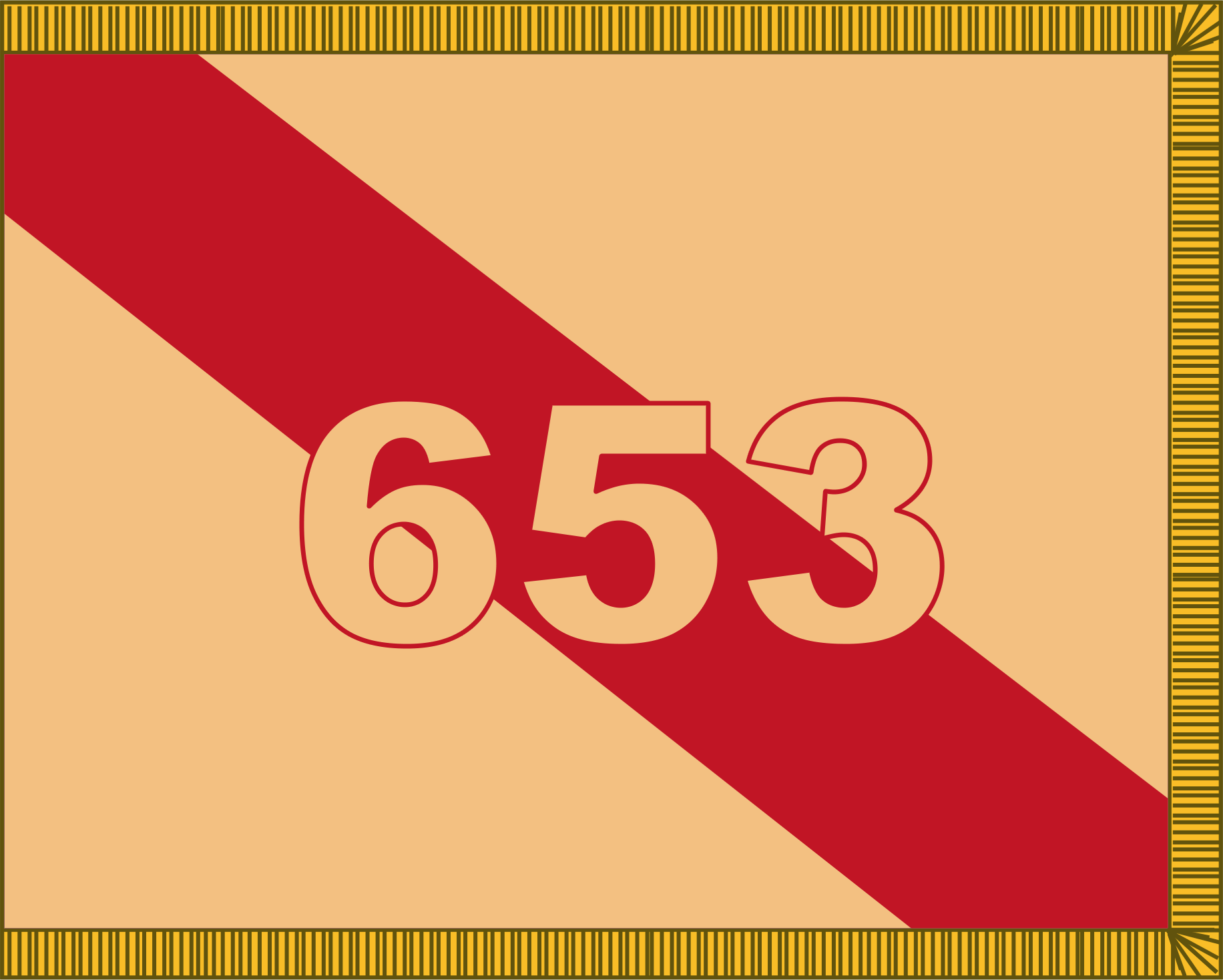
- 653rd Regional Support Group Flag

The 653rd Regional Support Group (RSG) is a United States Army Reserve unit headquartered in Mesa, Arizona. It is subordinate to the 311th Sustainment Command (Expeditionary) and provides logistics, sustainment, and mobilization support. The group commands multiple sustainment and quartermaster battalions across Arizona and California, and supports Large-Scale Deployment Operations (LSDO), including mobilization rotations at Fort Bliss.

The 653rd RSG is a relatively new unit with no historical connection to the World War II-era 653rd Quartermaster Company. While the QM Company was established in 1944 and participated in campaigns during World War II and Vietnam, the current RSG was created in 1998 and is not authorized to inherit the lineage, honors, or streamers of that earlier unit.

== Lineage ==
- 31 December 1998: Constituted in the Army Reserve as Headquarters and Headquarters Company, 653rd Support Group. This marked the official creation of the unit on paper.
- 16 April 1999: Activated at March Air Reserve Base, California. This marked the unit’s physical establishment and beginning of personnel, training, and readiness development.
- 17 May 2004 – 16 May 2006: Ordered into active military service in support of Operation Iraqi Freedom. The unit provided support functions during this period and then reverted to reserve status.
- 16 September 2006: The group was redesignated as the 653rd Regional Support Group
- 16 July 2007: Relocated to Mesa, Arizona, establishing a new long-term headquarters location.
- 25 October 2009 – 28 November 2010: The unit deployed to Camp Arifjan, Kuwait, supporting sustainment operations throughout the U.S. Central Command area of responsibility, then reverted to reserve status.
- 18 March 2019 – 16 March 2020: Ordered into active military service in support of Operation Enduring Freedom. The unit served as a CONUS Support Base Headquarters at Fort Bliss, Texas, and then reverted to reserve status.
- 1 August 2025 – present: Ordered into active military service and currently operating as a CONUS Support Base at Fort Bliss, Texas.

== Insignia ==
The distinctive unit insignia (DUI) of the 653rd Regional Support Group was approved on October 7, 1999.

Description: A gold-colored metal and enamel device, 1 1/8 inches (2.86 cm) in height, featuring a black pheon (arrowhead) surmounted by two gold lightning flashes in pile. All elements are enclosed by a red scroll inscribed with the motto “INTEGRITY AND DETERMINATION” in gold letters.

Symbolism:

- Buff (gold) and scarlet are the traditional colors used by U.S. Army support units.
- The black pheon represents the steel and aluminum industries near Moreno Valley, California, the group's original location.
- The lightning flashes denote the electronics and aerospace industries in the region, reflecting energy, innovation, and technology.

== Decorations ==
Ribbon	Award	Streamer	Streamer embroidered
	Meritorious Unit Commendation (Army)		SOUTHWEST ASIA 2009–2010

== Campaign Participation Credit ==
Campaign	Streamer	Description
Global War on Terrorism		Awarded 26 January 2012 for support of Operations Iraqi Freedom and Enduring Freedom.

== Organization ==
The 653rd Regional Support Group is a subordinate unit of the 311th Expeditionary Sustainment Command. As of January 2026 the group consists of the following units:

- 653rd Regional Support Group, in Mesa (AZ)
  - Headquarters and Headquarters Company, 653rd Regional Support Group, in Mesa (AZ)
  - 336th Combat Sustainment Support Battalion, in Buckeye (AZ)
    - Headquarters and Headquarters Company, 336th Combat Sustainment Support Battalion, in Buckeye (AZ)
    - 348th Transportation Medium Truck Company (POL, 5K GAL) (EAB Linehaul), in Buckeye (AZ)
    - 452nd Quartermaster Company (Field Service) (Modular), in Scottsdale (AZ)
    - 974th Transportation Detachment (Movement Control Team), in Buckeye (AZ)
  - 418th Quartermaster Battalion (Petroleum Support), in Red Rock (AZ)
    - Headquarters and Headquarters Detachment, 418th Quartermaster Battalion (Petroleum Support), in Red Rock (AZ)
    - 208th Transportation Medium Truck Company (PLS) (EAB Tactical), in Red Rock (AZ)
    - 331st Transportation Detachment (Movement Control Team), in Red Rock (AZ)
    - 655th Quartermaster Detachment (Petroleum Liaison Team), in Red Rock (AZ)
  - 419th Combat Sustainment Support Battalion, in Tustin (CA)
    - Headquarters and Headquarters Company, 419th Combat Sustainment Support Battalion, in Tustin (CA)
    - 163rd Ordnance Company (Ammo) (Modular), in Tustin (CA)
    - 340th Transportation Detachment (Movement Control Team), at Camp Pendleton (CA)
    - 478th Transportation Medium Truck Company (PLS) (EAB Tactical), at Camp Pendleton (CA)
    - 968th Quartermaster Company (Water Purification and Distribution), in Tustin (CA)
    - 1017th Quartermaster Company (Petroleum Support), at Camp Pendleton (CA)

Abbreviations: PLS — Palletized Load System; POL — Petroleum Oil Lubricants; EAB — Echelon Above Brigade
