= 304th Sustainment Brigade =

- 304th Sustainment Brigade shoulder sleeve insignia
- Active: February 2006-present
- Country: United States
- Branch: United States Army Reserve
- Type: Sustainment Brigade
- Size: Brigade
- Part of: 311th Sustainment Command (Expeditionary)
- Garrison/HQ: March Air Reserve Base, CA
- Mottos: Bridge the Gap, Sustain the Force
- Engagements: Operation Iraqi Freedom, Operation Enduring Freedom

Commanders
- Current commander: COL James Osowski
- Notable commanders: COL Chris Barra, COL Jon Blatt, COL Robin Jones, COL Scott Swanson

Insignia
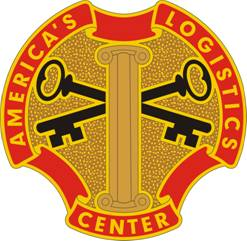
- 304TH SUSTAINMENT BRIGADE DUI

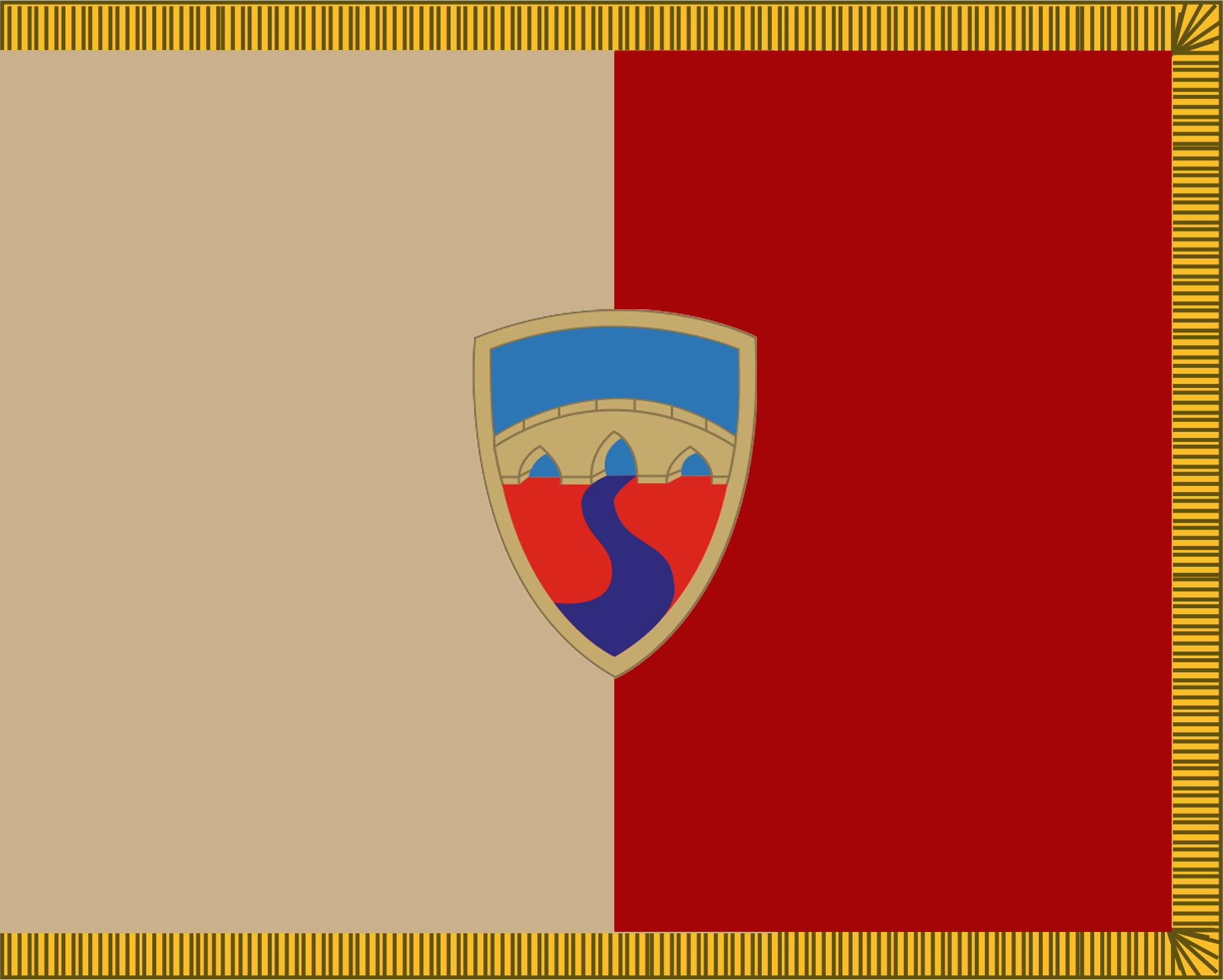
- 304th Sustainment Brigade Flag

The 304th Sustainment Brigade is a sustainment brigade of the United States Army Reserve. It is headquartered at March Air Reserve Base near Riverside, California.

Originally the 304th Corps Materiel Management Center, the unit became the 304th Support Center and received a distinctive unit insignia in August 2005. It then was transformed into a Sustainment Brigade in February 2006, and received its shoulder sleeve insignia in March 2006.

== Organization ==
The 304th Sustainment Brigade is a subordinate unit of the 311th Expeditionary Sustainment Command. As of January 2026 the brigade consists of the following units:

- 304th Sustainment Brigade, at March Air Reserve Base (CA)
  - 304th Special Troops Battalion, at March Air Reserve Base (CA)
    - Headquarters and Headquarters Company, 304th Sustainment Brigade, at March Air Reserve Base (CA)
    - 397th Brigade Signal Company (MEB/CAB/SB), at March Air Reserve Base (CA)
  - 155th Combat Sustainment Support Battalion, in South El Monte (CA)
    - Headquarters and Headquarters Company, 155th Combat Sustainment Support Battalion, in South El Monte (CA)
    - 137th Quartermaster Company (Field Service) (Modular), in South El Monte (CA)
    - 250th Transportation Medium Truck Company (Cargo) (EAB Linehaul), in South El Monte (CA)
    - 250th Quartermaster Company (Water Purification and Distribution), in Los Angeles (CA)
    - 312th Human Resources Company, in San Diego (CA)
      - 3rd Platoon (Postal), 312th Human Resources Company, in Mesa (AZ)
    - 387th Quartermaster Company (Mortuary Affairs), in Costa Mesa (CA)
    - 555th Transportation Detachment (Movement Control Team), in South El Monte (CA)
  - 371st Combat Sustainment Support Battalion, at March Air Reserve Base (CA)
    - Headquarters and Headquarters Company, 371st Combat Sustainment Support Battalion, at March Air Reserve Base (CA)
    - 63rd Human Resources Company, at March Air Reserve Base (CA)
      - 1st Platoon (Postal), 63rd Human Resources Company, in Bell (CA)
    - 304th Transportation Detachment (Movement Control Team), at March Air Reserve Base (CA)
    - 329th Quartermaster Company (Petroleum Pipeline and Terminal Operation), at March Air Reserve Base (CA)
    - 376th Human Resources Company, in Bell (CA)
      - 5th Platoon, 376th Human Resources Company, in Sherman Oaks (CA)
    - 693rd Quartermaster Company (Supply), in Bell (CA)
    - 806th Adjutant General Detachment (Military Mail Terminal Team), at March Air Reserve Base (CA)
    - 950th Ordnance Company (Support Maintenance), at March Air Reserve Base (CA)
  - 420th Transportation Battalion (Movement Control), in Sherman Oaks (CA)
    - Headquarters and Headquarters Detachment, 420th Transportation Battalion (Movement Control), in Sherman Oaks (CA)
    - 211th Transportation Company (Inland Cargo Transfer Company – ICTC), in Garden Grove (CA)
    - 566th Transportation Detachment (Movement Control Team), in Bell (CA)
    - 570th Transportation Detachment (Movement Control Team), in Sherman Oaks (CA)
    - 650th Transportation Detachment (Movement Control Team), in El Monte (CA)
    - 730th Transportation Medium Truck Company (PLS) (EAB Tactical), in Bell (CA)
    - 975th Transportation Detachment (Movement Control Team), at Garden Grove (CA)

Abbreviations: PLS – Palletized Load System; EAB – Echelon Above Brigade

== Operation Iraqi Freedom ==
The Brigade deployed to support Operation Iraqi Freedom in late 2008. The brigade relieved the 55th Sustainment Brigade and supported Multi-National Division North and Baghdad.

== Operation Enduring Freedom/Operation Inherent Resolve ==
in January 2020, the 304th Brigade Headquarters, Headquarters Company and Special Troops Battalion were activated and deployed to Camp Arifjan Kuwait in support of logistical Operations throughout the Southwest Asia area of operations. The 304th SB replaced the 77th SB during the COVID pandemic while supporting operations in Kuwait, Iraq, Afghanistan, Jordan Syria Saudi Arabia, UAE, and Qatar. The Unit fell in under the 311th ESC and the 1st TSC while in Kuwait.
