= 163rd Attack Wing =

California Air National Guard unit

163rd Attack Wing

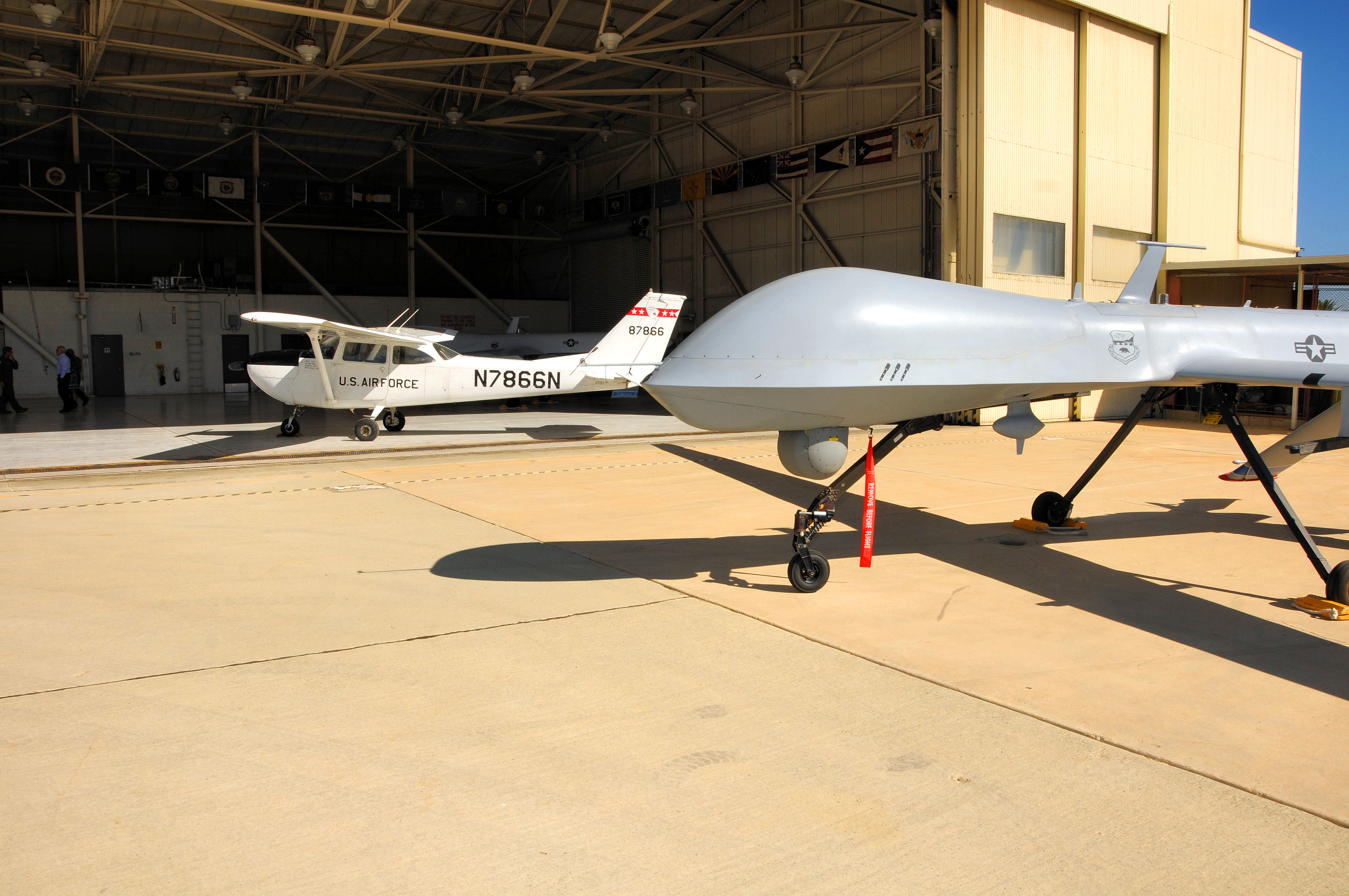
- 163rd Reconnaissance Wing MQ-1 and T-41 chase plane
- Active: 1958–present
- Country: United States
- Allegiance: California
- Branch: Air National Guard
- Type: Wing
- Role: RPA Ground Attack
- Part of: California Air National Guard
- Garrison/HQ: March Air Reserve Base, Riverside, California
- Nickname: Grizzlies
- Decorations: Air Force Outstanding Unit Award

Insignia
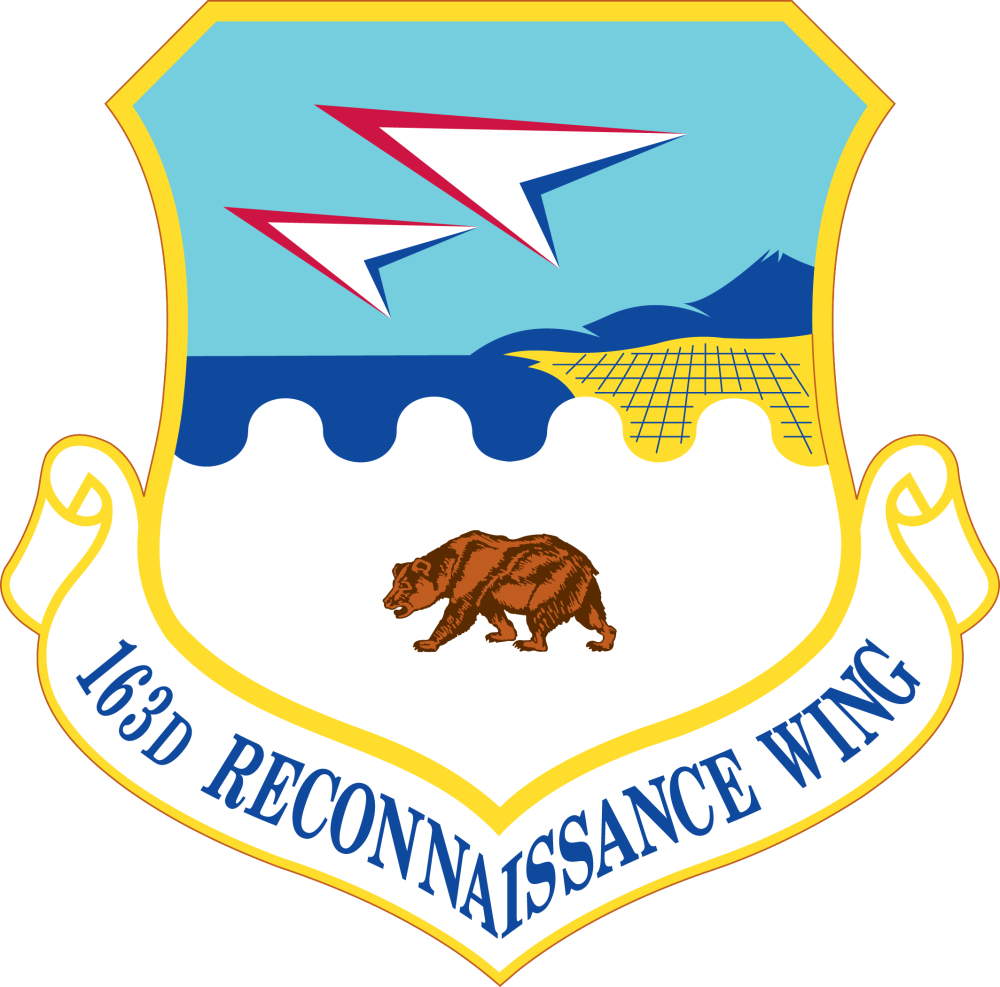
- 163rd Reconnaissance Wing emblem
- Tail code: CA

The 163rd Attack Wing (163 ATKW) is a unit of the California Air National Guard stationed at March Air Reserve Base in Riverside, California. As a "Grizzly" unit, the Wing operates the MQ-9 Reaper remotely piloted aircraft, maintaining a dual-status mission that allows it to serve both the Governor of California for domestic emergencies and the federal government for global combat operations. When activated for federal service, the Wing falls under the operational control of the United States Air Force. For combat and operational missions, it is gained by the Air Combat Command (ACC). For its responsibilities as a Formal Training Unit (FTU), it is gained by the Air Education and Training Command (AETC).

== Mission ==
The 163 ATKW is one of the first Air National Guard units to fly the MQ-1 Predator. The mission of the 163 ATKW is to execute global unmanned aerial systems, combat support, and humanitarian missions by highly trained Air National Guard personnel.

== Units ==
The 163rd Attack Wing consists of the following units:

- 163rd Operations Group
  - 196th Attack Squadron
  - 160th Attack Squadron (Flying Training Unit)
  - 163rd Operations Support Squadron
  - 210th Weather Flight
- 163rd Mission Support Group
- 163rd Maintenance Group
- 163rd Medical Group

== History ==
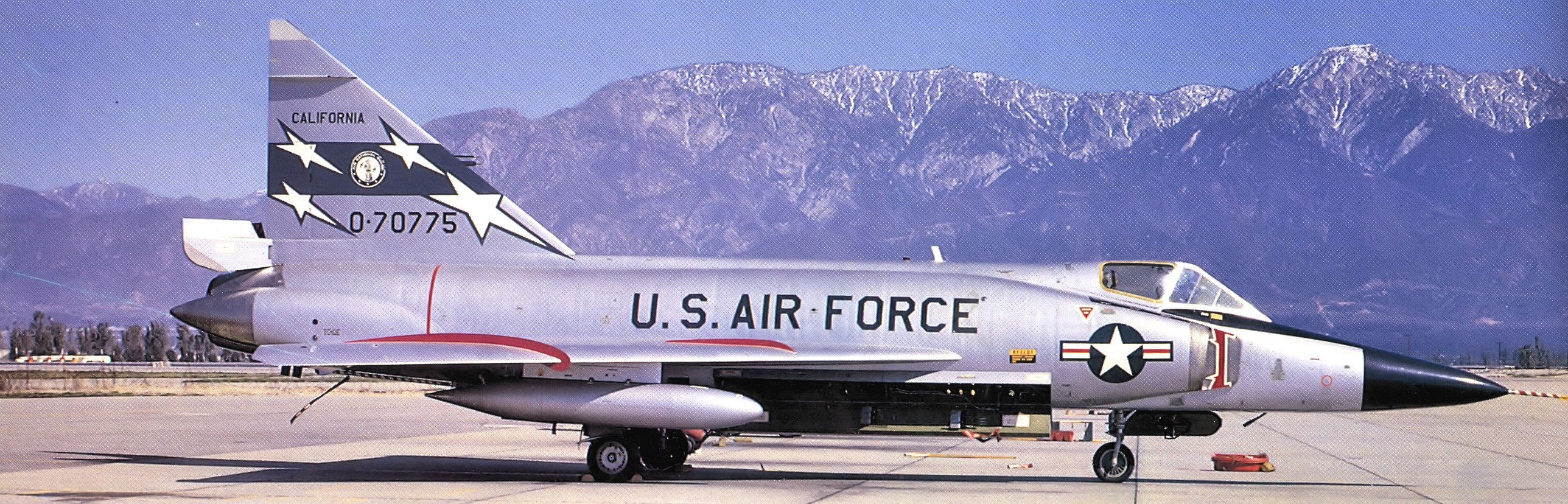
California Air National Guard 196th Fighter Interceptor Squadron F-102A Delta Dagger in 1970 (Note: This aircraft is now on static display at Clovis Park, California.)

=== Air Defense Command ===
On 17 May 1958, the California Air National Guard's 196th Fighter-Interceptor Squadron at Ontario International Airport was authorized to expand to a group level. The 163rd Fighter Group (Air Defense) was established, and the 196th became the group's flying squadron. Other units assigned to the group were the 163rd Material Squadron, 163rd Air Base Squadron, and the 163rd USAF Dispensary. The group's mobilization gaining command was Air Defense Command (ADC).

Initially flying North American F-86A Sabre day interceptors, the squadron upgraded to F-86Hs in 1959 and to Convair F-102 Delta Daggers in 1965. The F-102 was being phased out of active-duty units in the early 1960s, and the 163rd was one of the last ANG units to replace its F-86 Sabres. The F-102, however, was obsolete as an interceptor by the time it was received by the 163rd. The Delta Daggers soldiered into the early 1970s until they were retired to the Aerospace Maintenance and Regeneration Center at Davis-Monthan Air Force Base, Arizona.

The unit received two Air Force Outstanding Unit Awards for extended periods ending in 1964 and 1974.

=== Tactical Air Command ===
On 8 March 1975, the unit took on the challenge of a new mission. Its mobilization gaining command became Tactical Air Command as the unit was renamed the 163rd Tactical Air Support Group. The 163rd received the Cessna O-2 Skymaster to accomplish the unit's new role.

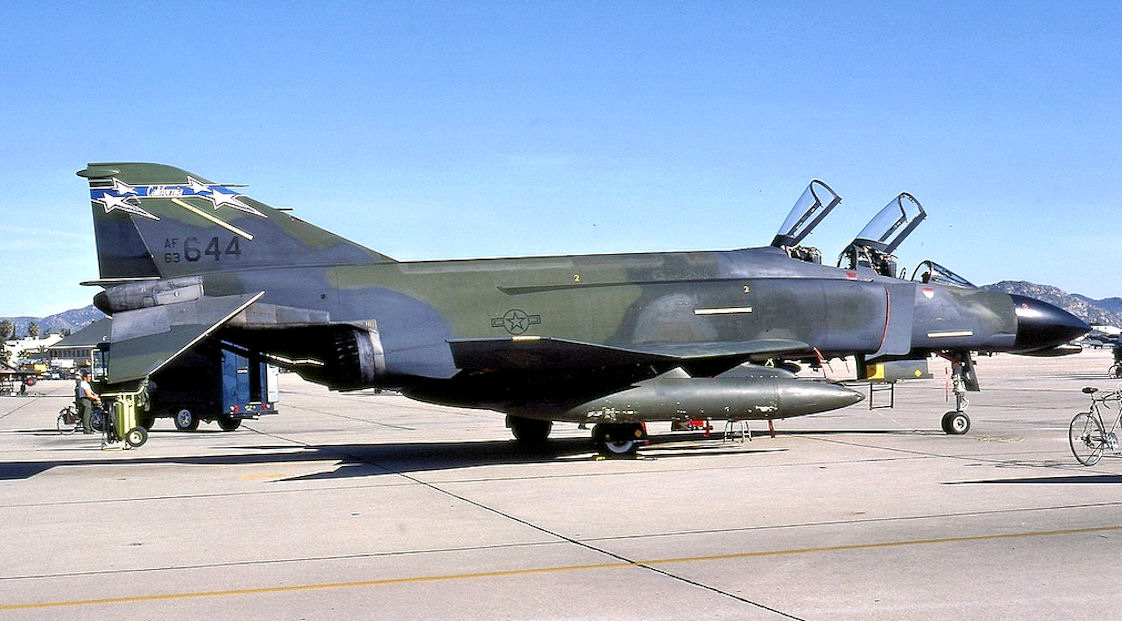
196th TFS F-4C about 1987 (Note: Aircraft is McDonnell F-4C Phantom II, eerial 63-7644. This was the type of aircraft Capt. Dean Paul Martin, was flying when he crashed.)

In October 1982, the 163rd assumed a tactical fighter role, flying the McDonnell F-4C Phantom II. The group concurrently moved to March Air Force Base, near Riverside, into new facilities specifically built for the unit and became a tenant ANG wing at the then-Strategic Air Command installation.

On 21 March 1987, Captain Dean Paul Martin ("Dino", son of entertainer Dean Martin), a pilot in the 196th Tactical Fighter Squadron crashed his F-4C into San Gorgonio Mountain, California shortly after departure from March during a snowstorm. Both Martin and his Weapons System Officer were killed. The 163rd transitioned to the upgraded F-4E Phantom II on 1 April 1987. This newer aircraft incorporated more sophisticated electronics and weaponry.

In July 1990, the unit once again changed missions and was redesignated the 163rd Tactical Reconnaissance Group. The 163rd was equipped with RF-4C, an unarmed reconnaissance model of the Phantom II aircraft and maintained a dual state/federal mission. The unit's primary mission was to provide tactical reconnaissance to all friendly forces. The unit was also actively involved in statewide missions. This was accomplished by using a system of visual, optical, electronic, and other sensors. During this time the aircrews accumulated over 30,000 hours of flying time and the unit deployed across both the Pacific and Atlantic Oceans.

The 163rd deployed to Pisa Airport, Italy, in support of Operation Decisive Endeavor. While deployed, the unit flew as the lead unit in support of flight operations over Bosnia.

=== Air refueling ===
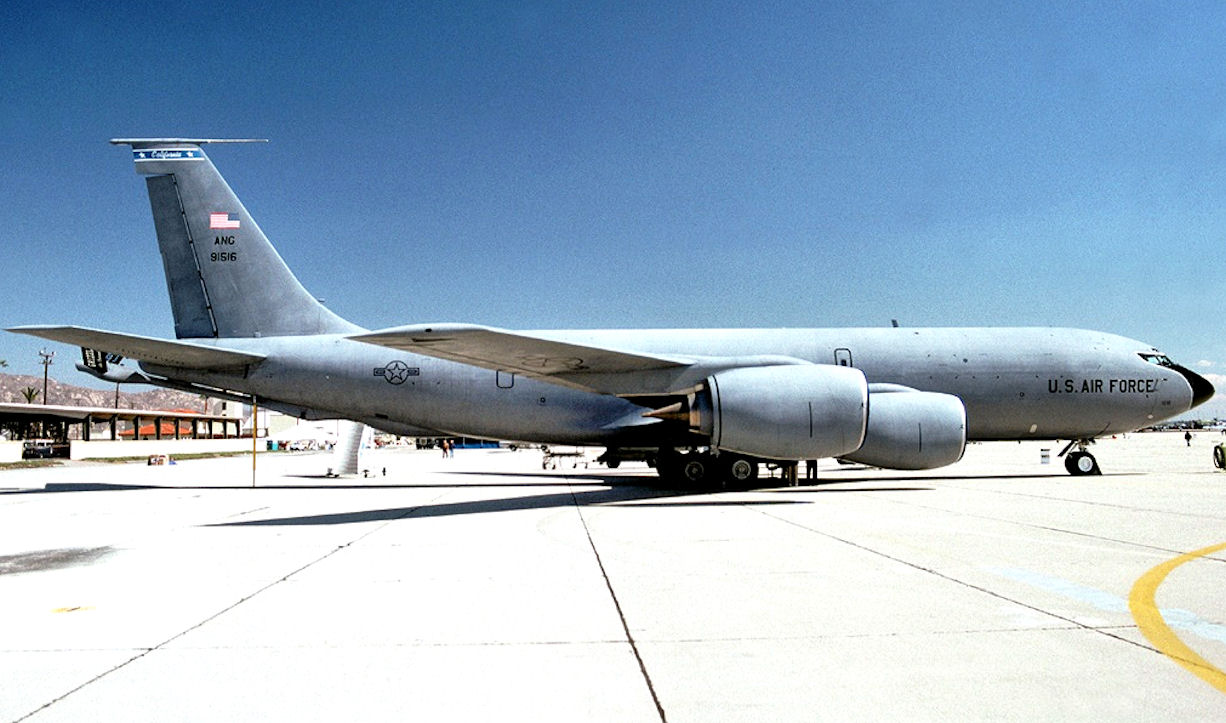
196th Air Refueling Squadron KC-135R

After the end of Operation Desert Storm in 1991, the phaseout of the RF-4C Phantom II with the Air National Guard was accelerated. In 1993, the RF-4s were retired to Davis-Monthan. The squadron became an air refueling group and was equipped with Boeing KC-135E Stratotankers. As a result of this change in mission and aircraft, the 163rd's mobilization gaining command became Air Mobility Command. In 1995, the group expanded and became the 163rd Air Refueling Wing. The wing later transitioned to the KC-135R Stratotanker.

In one of the highest profile military events of the year, nearly 100 members and three KC-135R aircraft from the 163rd wing deployed in support of Operation Allied Force. The 163rd flew combat missions around-the-clock refueling North Atlantic Treaty Organization (NATO) aircraft, including complex night formation sorties with the F-117A Nighthawk Stealth Fighter. 1999 also saw the 163rd's Pacer Crag conversion begin in June and complete by the end of the year. This extensive aircraft modernization project meant intensive aircrew training and was expected to extend the life of the 40-year-old Boeing jet beyond the year 2020.

The wing and its 196th Air Refueling Squadron were widely recognized for achievements in 1999 and earned the Air Force Outstanding Unit Award for the fourth time. The award covers a period during which the unit deployed 300 personnel and three aircraft to Pisa Airport, Italy in support of Operation Decisive Endeavor and also flew as the lead unit in support of flight operations over Bosnia. The 163rd Operations Support Flight, 163rd Logistics Group, 163rd Logistics Squadron, and the 196th Air Refueling Squadron also earned the Governor's Outstanding Unit Citation.

The 163rd provided support to NATO's Operation Joint Forge while deployed to Istres Air Base, France from 31 October through 3 December 2000, deploying three KC-135 Stratotanker air refueling aircraft along with nearly 210 personnel. As part of Air Expeditionary Force 9, the 163rd "Grizzlies" also sent personnel to Kuwait, Germany, France, Saudi Arabia and Turkey from October through December 2000.

=== Unmanned aerial vehicle operations ===
During a ceremony on 28 November 2007 at March Air Reserve Base, the wing became the 163rd Reconnaissance Wing, taking on the Predator mission in place of its KC-135R tankers. The wing's last KC-135R left in April 2008. The wing was the first Air National Guard unit to receive the General Atomics MQ-1 Predator armed unmanned reconnaissance aircraft and was the first to become a fully functional ANG Flying Training Unit (FTU) and to operate a Field Training Detachment (FTD) for the Predator.

The wing operates its MQ-1s out of March, but also uses the restricted airspace near Edwards Air Force Base in southern California for training, operating a detachment from Southern California Logistics Airport, the former George Air Force Base, northeast of March in Victorville. The 163rd also flies its Predators under the service's "remote split operations" approach. This means that the aircraft and a contingent of maintainers are deployed forward, along with some pilots to handle take-offs and landings. However, the majority of the wing's pilots remain stateside and operate the aircraft via satellite communications links.

The wing's FTU falls under Air Combat Command and previously trained pilots and sensor operators to become Predator aircrew and now trains them as MQ-9 Reaper aircrew. The FTD, which falls under Air Education and Training Command, previously trained enlisted personnel to build, maintain and repair the Predator and now performs the same training mission utilizing the Reaper.

On 28 August 2013, a Predator flew over the Rim Fire in California providing infrared video of lurking fires, after receiving emergency approval.

On 1 July 2015 the wing became the 163rd Attack Wing, and switched from flying the MQ-1 Predator to the General Atomics MQ-9 Reaper.

== Popular culture ==
The unit was featured in an ABC News story on 12 January 2010. The wing has since retired the MQ-1 and currently flies the MQ-9 Reaper remotely piloted aircraft.

== Lineage ==
- Constituted as the 163rd Fighter Group (Air Defense), and allotted to California ANG in 1958

Extended federal recognition and activated on 17 May 1958

- Redesignated 163rd Fighter-Interceptor Group on 15 September 1972

Redesignated 163rd Tactical Air Support Group on 8 March 1975
Redesignated 163rd Tactical Fighter Group on 1 October 1982
Redesignated 163rd Tactical Reconnaissance Group on 1 July 1990
Redesignated 163rd Reconnaissance Group on 16 March 1992
Redesignated 163rd Air Refueling Group on 1 October 1993
Redesignated 163rd Air Refueling Wing on 1 October 1995
Redesignated 163rd Reconnaissance Wing on 28 November 2007
Redesignated 163rd Attack Wing on 1 July 2015

=== Assignments ===
- California Air National Guard, 17 May 1958

Gained by 27th Air Division, Air Defense Command
Gained by Los Angeles Air Defense Sector, Air Defense Command, 1 July 1960
Gained by 27th Air Division, Air Defense Command (later Aerospace Defense Command), 1 April 1966
Gained by 26th Air Division, Aerospace Defense Command, 1 January 1970
Gained by Tactical Air Command, 8 March 1975
Gained by Air Combat Command, 1 June 1992
Gained by Air Mobility Command, 1 October 1993
Elements gained by Air Combat Command, 28 November 2007
Elements gained by Air Education and Training Command, 28 November 2007

=== Components ===
- 163rd Operations Group, 1 October 1995 – present
- 196th Fighter-Interceptor Squadron (later 196th Tactical Air Support Squadron, 196th Tactical Fighter Squadron, 196th Tactical Reconnaissance Squadron, 196th Reconnaissance Squadron, 196th Air Refueling Squadron, 196th Reconnaissance Squadron, 196th Attack Squadron, 17 May 1958 – 1 October 1995

=== Stations ===
- Ontario Municipal Airport, California, 7 May 1958
- March Air Force Base (later March Air Reserve Base), California, 1 October 1982 – Present

Elements at Southern California Logistics Airport, California, 1 June 2012 – Present

=== Aircraft ===
- F-86F Sabre, 1957–1959
- F-86H Sabre, 1959–1965
- F-102 Delta Dagger, 1965–1975
- O-2 Skymaster, 1975–1982
- F-4C Phantom II, 1982–1987
- F-4E Phantom II, 1987–1990
- RF-4C Phantom II, 1990–1993
- KC-135E Stratotanker, 1993–2002
- KC-135R Stratotanker, 2002–2006
- MQ-1 Predator, 2007–2015
- MQ-9 Reaper, 2015 – present
