= March Air Reserve Base =

Military air base in Riverside County, California

- Near Moreno Valley, California in the United States
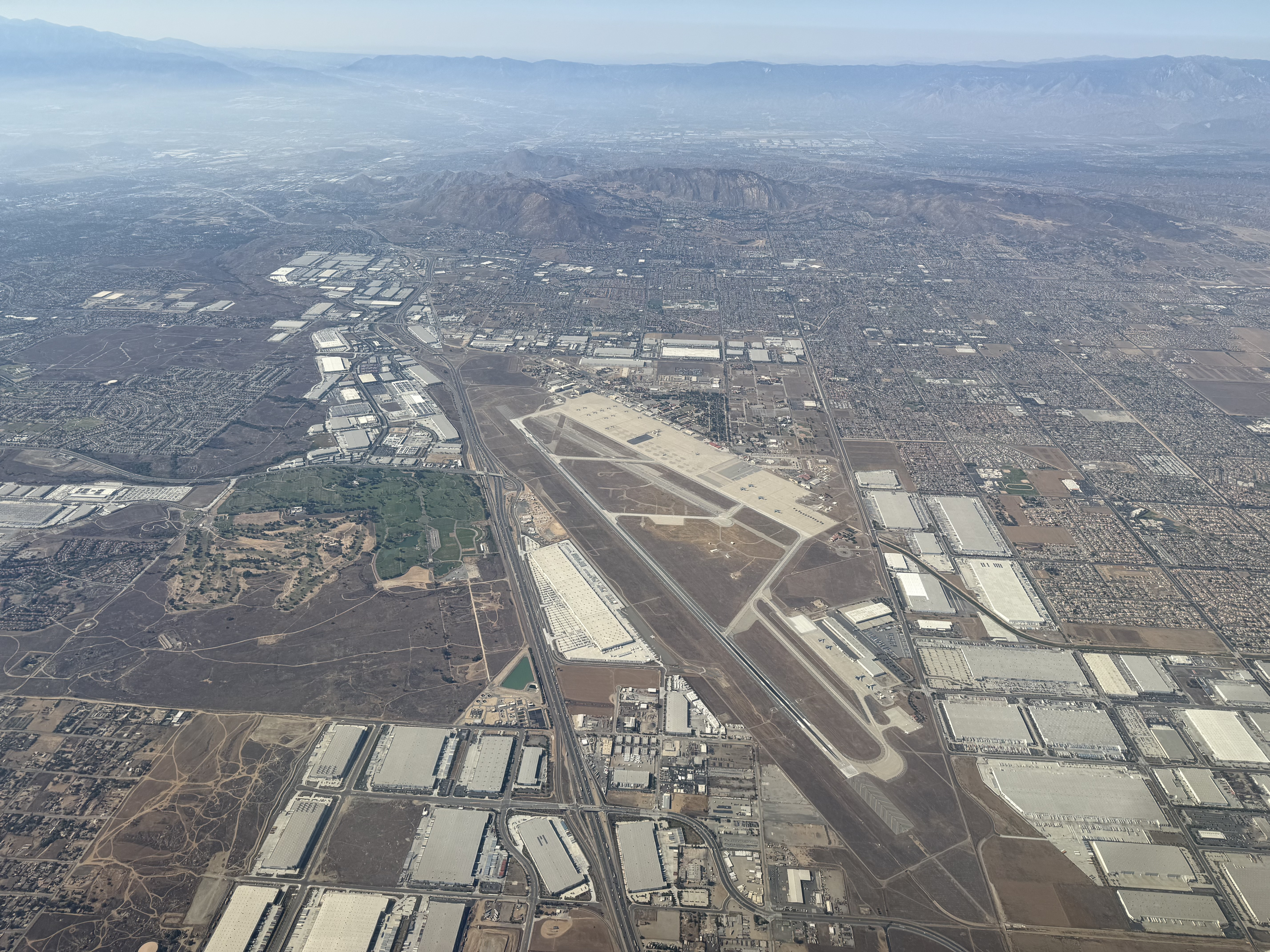
- An aerial view of March ARB and its surroundings in 2025

Site information
- Type: US Air Reserve Base
- Owner: Department of Defense
- Operator: US Air Force
- Controlled by: Air Force Reserve Command
- Condition: Operational
- Website: www.march.afrc.af.mil/

Site history
- Built: 1917
- Built by: US Army Air Service
- In use: 1917 – present

Garrison information
- Current commander: Colonel Bryan M. Bailey
- Garrison: 452nd Air Mobility Wing

Airfield information
- Identifiers: IATA: RIV, ICAO: KRIV, FAA LID: RIV, WMO: 722860
- Elevation: 468.1 metres (1,536 ft) AMSL
Runways
Direction	Length and surface
14/32	4,054.4 metres (13,302 ft) concrete
12/30	932.9 metres (3,061 ft) concrete

March Air Reserve Base (IATA: RIV, ICAO: KRIV, FAA LID: RIV) (March ARB), previously known as March Air Force Base (March AFB), is a United States Air Force Reserve base located in Riverside County, California, between the cities of Riverside, Moreno Valley, and Perris. It is the home to the Air Force Reserve Command's Fourth Air Force (4 AF) Headquarters and the host of the 452nd Air Mobility Wing (452 AMW), the largest air mobility wing of the Fourth Air Force. In addition to multiple units of the Air Force Reserve Command supporting Air Mobility Command, Air Combat Command, and Pacific Air Forces, March ARB is also home to units from the Army Reserve, Navy Reserve, Marine Corps Reserve, California Air National Guard, and the California Army National Guard. For almost 50 years, March AFB was a Strategic Air Command base during the Cold War. The facility covers 2,075 acres (840 hectares) of land.

== Units ==
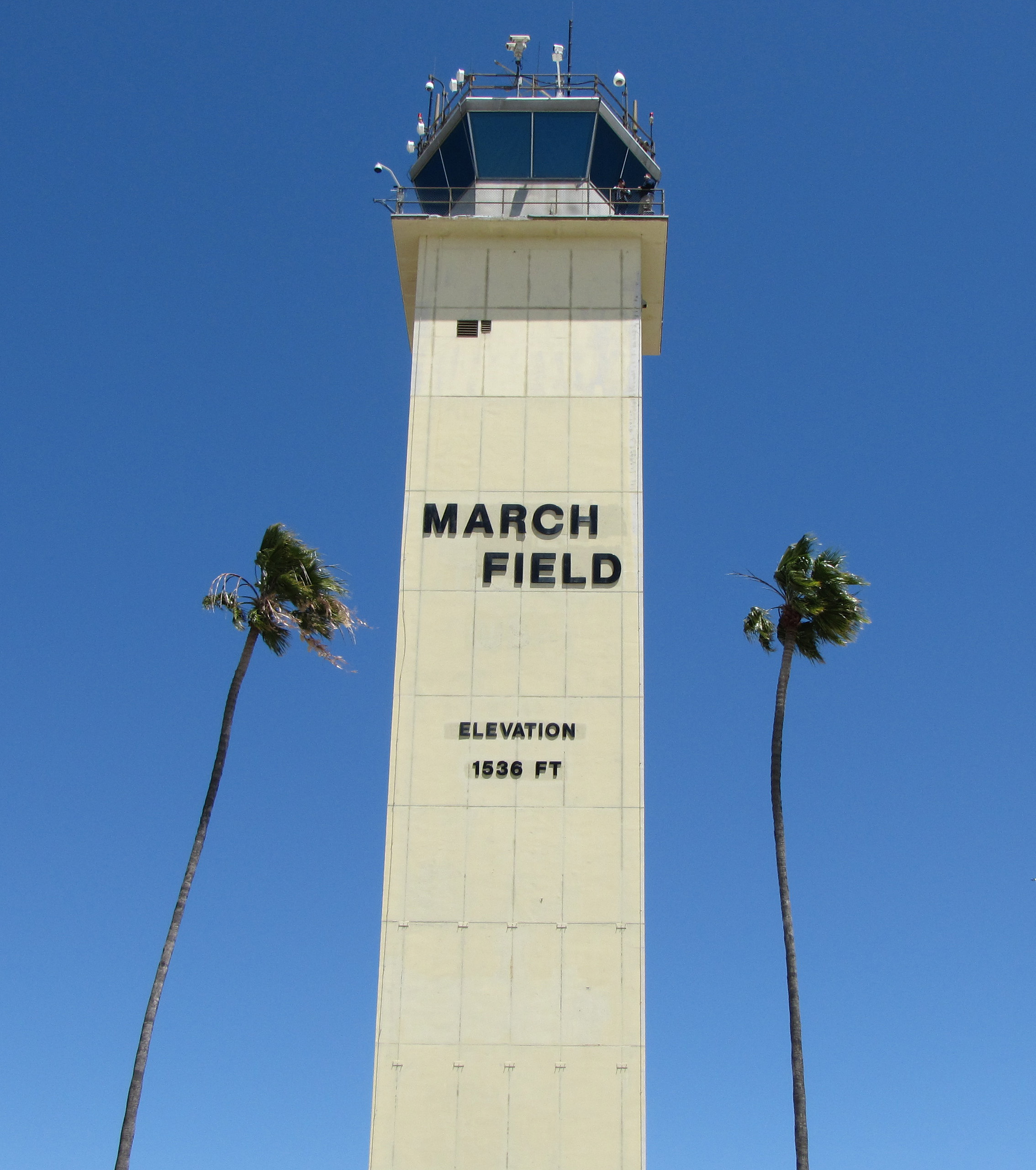
The control tower at March (demolished in 2015).

On 1 January 1994, the 722nd Air Refueling Wing was activated at then-March AFB to replace the 22nd Air Refueling Wing, which was moving to McConnell AFB, KS, w/o/p/e. The wing was inactivated on 1 April 1996 and base responsibilities transferred to Air Force Reserve 452nd Air Mobility Wing (452 AMW).

Today the host unit at March remains the 452 AMW, which in addition to its operational flying mission, also provides host base support for numerous tenant units. March ARB is also the home to Headquarters, Fourth Air Force (4 AF) of the Air Force Reserve Command and multiple units of the California Air National Guard.

- 452nd Air Mobility Wing
  - 452nd Operations Group
    - 336th Air Refueling Squadron
    - 729th Airlift Squadron
    - 452nd Operations Support Squadron
    - 912nd Air Refueling Squadron (Active Duty "Associate" Squadron)
  - 452nd Maintenance Group
  - 452nd Mission Support Group
  - 452nd Medical Group
  - 1st Combat Camera Squadron Operating Location Charlie (established late 2017)

=== Tenant units ===
- Fourth Air Force
- 163rd Attack Wing, California Air National Guard
- 144th Fighter Wing Detachment 1, California Air National Guard
- 701st Combat Operations Squadron, 610th Air Operations Group, Tenth Air Force
- 362nd Air Force Recruiting Squadron, 372nd Recruiting Group, Air Force Recruiting Service
- AFN Broadcast Center/Defense Media Center
- Defense Visual Information Center, Defense Media Activity
- 653rd Area Support Group,
- 304th Sustainment Brigade
- 358th Civil Affairs Brigade, 351st Civil Affairs Command, United States Army Civil Affairs and Psychological Operations Command
- Naval and Marine Corps Reserve Center
- Air and Marine Operations Center, CBP Air and Marine OperationsArmy Reserve

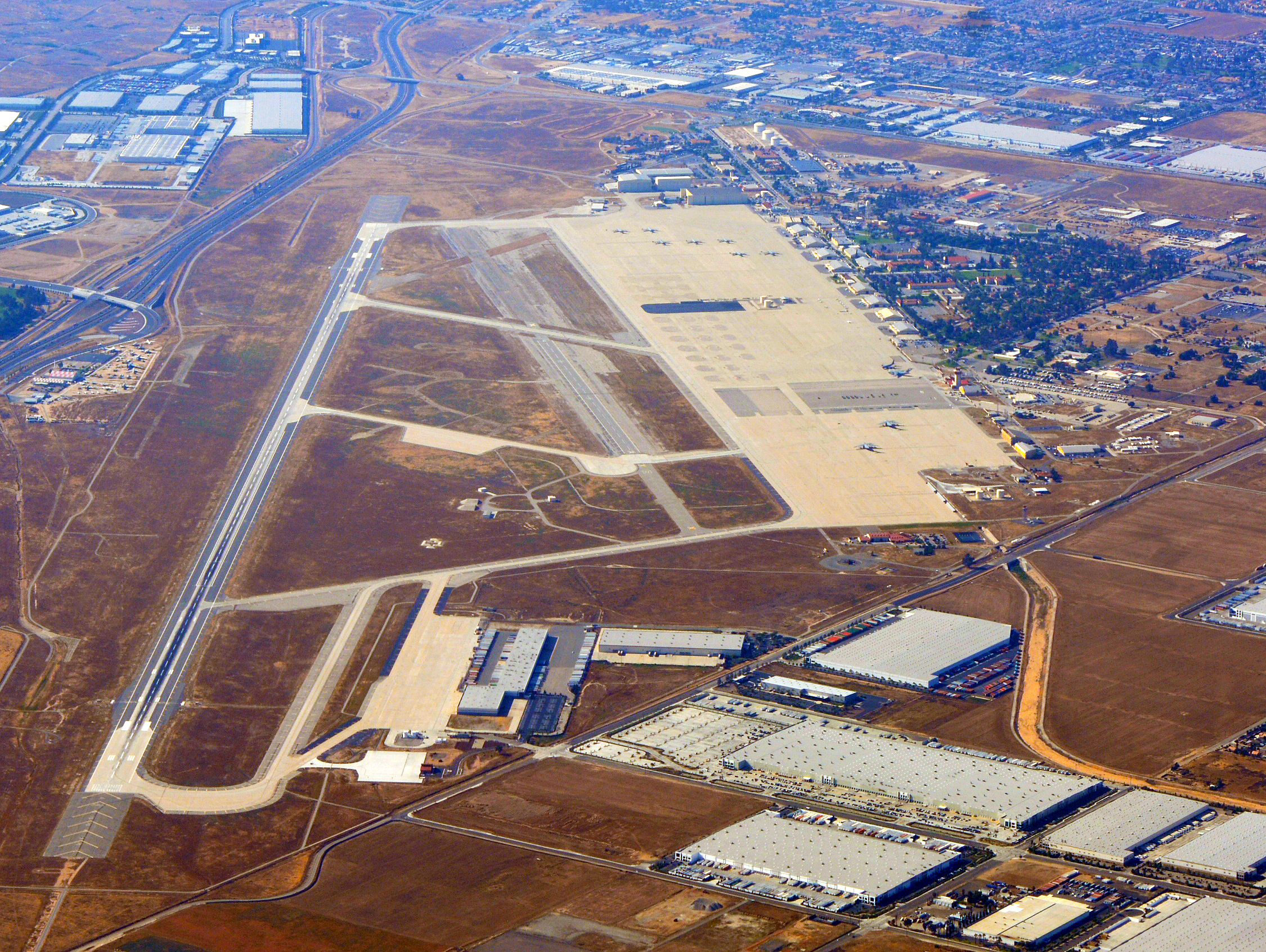
An aerial view of March ARB in 2015.

- Civil Air Patrol, California Wing, Inland Empire Group III, 45th Composite Squadron
- Defense Commissary Agency
- Army & Air Force Exchange Service
- March Joint Powers Authority

Since 1995, March ARB has hosted alert site operations of the California Air National Guard's 144th Fighter Wing (144 FW), which is also operationally gained by Air Combat Command. Before 2013, the 144 FW stationed F-16 Fighting Falcon aircraft, initially consisting of F-16C/D Block 25, then F-16C/D Block 32, on alert at March. Following the wing's transition to the F-15 Eagle, the 144 FW now stations contracted South Dakota ANG (114th FW) F-16C Block 30s at this operating location in support of USNORTHCOM and NORAD.

Civilian agency flight activities include a permanently based U.S. Customs and Border Protection Air Unit, as well as a California Department of Forestry air unit that uses the base on an intermittent basis.

Dragon Flight is a civilian formation flight demonstration team, based at March, sponsored by the March Field Aero Club. The team uses the T-34 Mentor, making numerous appearances throughout the southwest United States each year.

== March Field Airfest ==
The March Field Airfest, also known as Thunder Over the Empire, is a biennial air show held at March ARB. It is among the largest events in the Inland Empire and Riverside County. The show has featured such performers as the United States Air Force Thunderbirds, the F-22 Raptor, and many other military and civilian demonstrations. The year 2010 saw the Patriots Jet Team as the highlight demonstration team of the show. Attendance for the 2010 show was estimated at over 150,000. The most recent event, renamed the Southern California Air Show, was held April 12–13, 2025.

== History ==
March is one of the oldest airfields operated by the United States military, being established as Alessandro Flying Training Field in February 1918. It was one of thirty-two Air Service training camps established after the United States entry into World War I in April 1917. The airfield was renamed March Field the following month in honor of 2nd Lieutenant Peyton C. March, Jr., the recently deceased son of then-Army Chief of Staff Peyton C. March, who was killed in an air crash in Texas just fifteen days after being commissioned.

=== World War I ===
The establishment of March Air Force Base began in the early 20th century at a time when the United States was rushing to build up its military forces in anticipation of an entry into World War I. In 1917, in response to news from the front lines, Congressional appropriations attempted to back the plans of General George O. Squier, the Army's chief signal officer, to "put the Yankee punch into the war by building an army in the air".

At the same time, the War Department announced its intentions to build several new military installations. Efforts by Frank Miller, then-owner of the Mission Inn in Riverside, California, Hiram Johnson and others, succeeded in gaining War Department approval to construct an airfield at Alessandro Field located near Riverside, an airstrip used by aviators from Rockwell Field on cross country flights from San Diego.

The Army quickly set about establishing the new air field. Sergeant Charles E. Garlick, who had landed at Alessandro Field in a Curtiss JN-4 "Jenny" in November 1917, was selected to lead the advance contingent of four men to the new base from Rockwell Field. On 26 February 1918, Garlick and his crew and a group of muleskinners from nearby Colton, known to be experts in clearing land as well as for their colorful syntax, began the task of excavating the building foundations, and on 1 March 1918, Alessandro Flying Training Field was opened.

On 20 March 1918, Alessandro Flying Training Field became March Field, named in honor of Second Lieutenant Peyton C. March, Jr., son of the Army Chief of Staff, who had been killed when his Curtiss JN-4 "Jenny" crashed in Fort Worth, Texas the previous month. His crash occurred two weeks after he had been commissioned in the regular United States Army Air Service.

By late April 1918, enough progress had been made in the construction of the new field to allow the arrival of the first troops. The commander of the 818th Aero Squadron detachment, Captain William Carruthers, took over as the field's first commander and for a time operated out of an office in the Mission Inn. Within a record 60 days, the grain stubble-covered plain of Moreno Valley had been partially transformed to include twelve hangars, six barracks equipped for 150 men each, mess halls, a machine shop, post exchange, hospital, a supply depot, an aero repair building, bachelor officer's quarters, and a residence for the commanding officer. Eventually March Field saw the construction of some 50 buildings. It covered over 700 acres and could accommodate up to 1,000 personnel. Dozens of wooden buildings served as headquarters, maintenance, and officers' quarters. Enlisted men had to bivouac in tents.

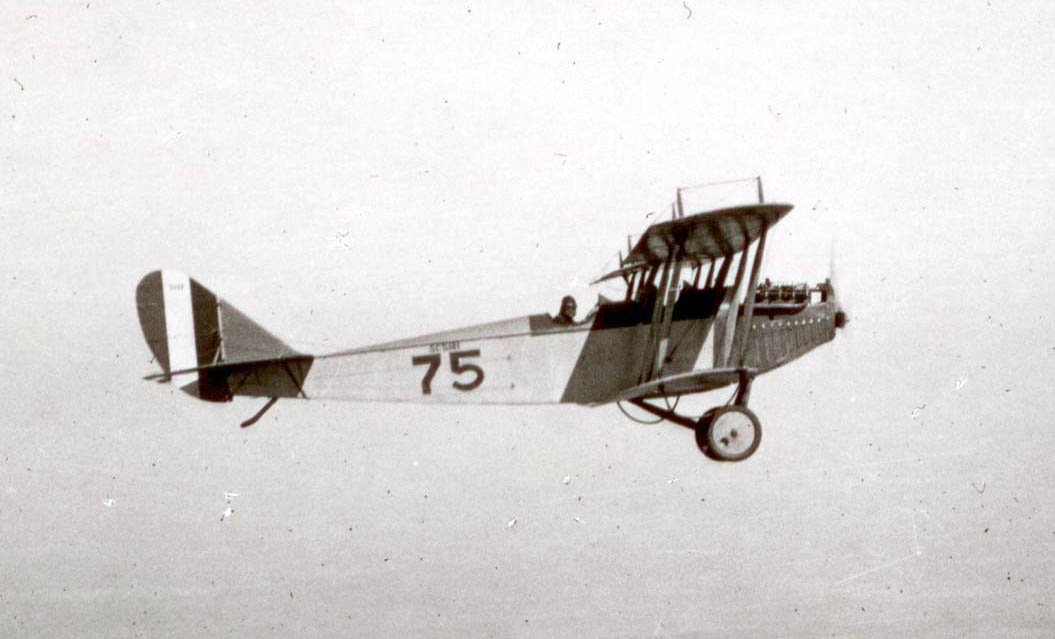
A Curtiss JN-4 "Jenny" on a training flight during World War I. This was the type of aircraft used at March Field during this era for basic military pilot training.

The first flying squadron was the 215th Aero Squadron, which was transferred from Rockwell Field, North Island, California. Later the 68th and the 289th were also transferred up from Rockwell. Only a few U.S. Army Air Service aircraft arrived with squadrons, most of the Curtiss JN-4 Jennys to be used for flight training were shipped in wooden crates by railcar.

March Field served as a base for primary flight training with an eight-week course. It could accommodate a maximum of 300 students. In 1918, flight training occurred in two phases: primary and advanced. Primary training consisted of pilots learning basic flight skills under dual and solo instruction. After completion of their primary training at Mather, flight cadets were then transferred to another base for advanced training. Training units assigned to March were:

- Post Headquarters, March Field, March 1918 – April 1923
- 68th Aero Squadron (II), June 1918 (transferred from Rockwell Field, California)

Re-designated as Squadron "A", July–November 1918

- 215th Aero Squadron, March 1918 (transferred from Rockwell Field, California)

Re-designated as Squadron "B", July–November 1918

- 289th Aero Squadron, August 1918 (transferred from Rockwell Field, California)

Re-designated as Squadron "C", July–November 1918

- 293d Aero Squadron, June 1918

Re-designated as Squadron "D", July–November 1918

- 311th Aero Squadron, June 1918

Re-designated as Squadron "E", July–November 1918

- Flying School Detachment (Consolidation of Squadrons A-E), November 1918 – November 1919

=== First accident ===
On 2 August 1918, Standard J-1, AS-1918, crashed and was written off at March Field. "By Associated Press to The Sun Riverside, Aug. 2. – William L. Ash, flying cadet at March field [sic], fell 1,000 feet in a tail spin today and was seriously injured. He suffered a fractured leg and arm and puncture of the side. It is expected he will recover. Ash lived in Pittsburg, Kansas. It was the first serious accident at March field. Ash was making his second solo flight when he fell."

=== Post-Armistice ===
With the sudden end of World War I on 11 November 1918, the future operational status of March Field was uncertain. Many local officials speculated that the U.S. government would keep the field open because of the outstanding combat record established by March-trained pilots in Europe. Locals also pointed to the optimal weather conditions in the Riverside area for flight training. Cadets in flight training on 11 November 1918 were allowed to complete their training; however, no new cadets were assigned to the base. Furthermore, the separate training squadrons were consolidated into a single Flying School detachment, as many of the personnel assigned were being demobilized.

=== Inter-war years ===
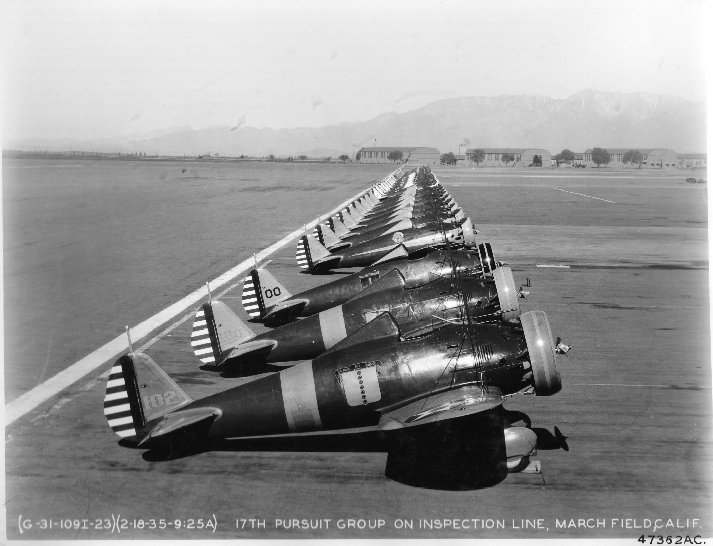
Boeing P-26A Peashooters of the 17th Pursuit Group, 18 February 1935. Number 33–102 sits in the foreground. These aircraft were later sent to the 1st Pursuit Squadron/Group of the Philippine Air Force in 1937.

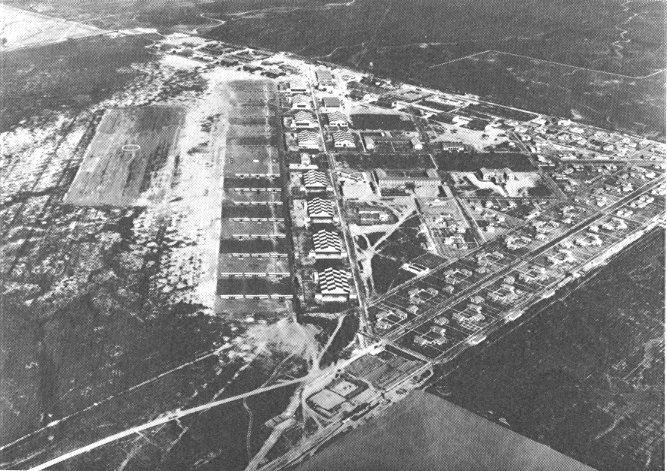
Oblique aerial photo of March Field, taken in March 1932 looking southeast to northwest.

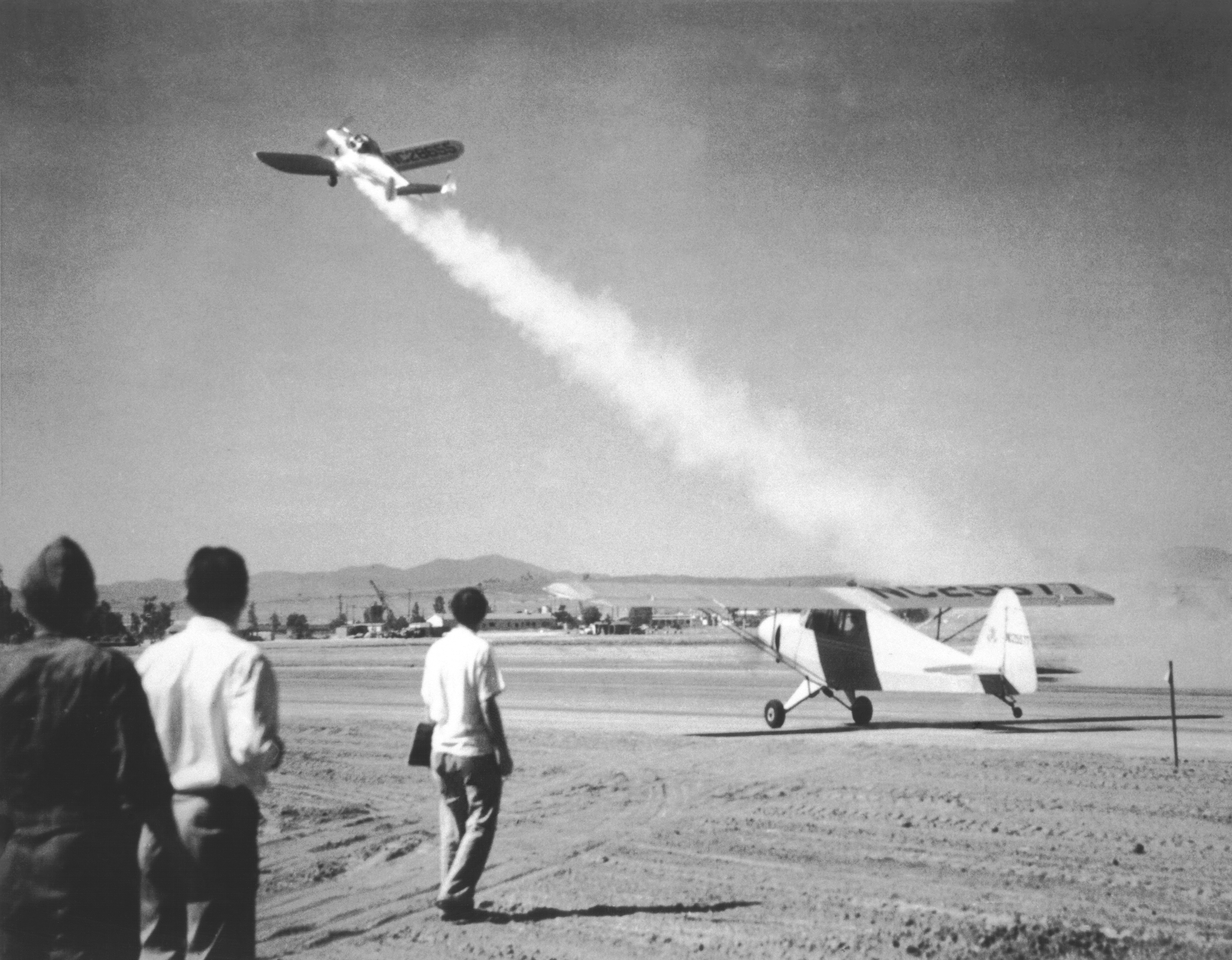
The first JATO takeoff by an ERCO Ercoupe fitted with a GALCIT booster, performed at March Field in 1941.

The signing of the armistice in November 1918 did not halt training at March Field. Initially March was used by several Air Service squadrons that returned from France:

- 9th Aero Squadron: 22 July – 2 August, 15 November – 11 December 1919
- 19th Aero Squadron: 1 October – 29 June 1921
- 23rd Aero Squadron: 1 October 1921 – 21 March 1922

On 13 December 1919, the United States House of Representatives passed an appropriations bill for $9.6 million for the purchase of additional land at military camps "which are to be made part of the permanent military establishment." March Field was allocated $64,000 of this amount.

However, by 1921, the decision had been made to phase down all activities at the base in accordance with sharply reduced military budgets. By the spring of 1923, March Field was deactivated as an active duty airfield, however, and a small caretaker unit was assigned to the facility for administrative reasons. It was used by the aerial forestry patrol. It also was used intermittently to support small military units.

March Field remained quiet for only a short time. In July 1926, Congress created the Army Air Corps and approved the Army's five-year plan which called for an expansion in pilot training and the activation of tactical units. Accordingly, funds were appropriated for the reopening of March Field in March 1927.

Colonel William C. Gardenhire, assigned to direct the refurbishment of the base, had just directed his crews to replace underpinnings of many of the previous buildings when he received word the future construction would be in Spanish Mission architectural design. In time, March Field would receive permanent structures. The rehabilitation effort was nearly complete in August 1927, when Major Millard F. Harmon reported in to take over the job of base commander and commandant of the flying school. Classes began shortly after his arrival. The 13th School Group and its 47th and 53rd School Squadrons provided primary and basic flying training for future Air Force leaders such as Hoyt Vandenberg, Nathan Twining, Thomas Power and Curtis LeMay.

As March Field began to take on the appearance of a permanent military installation, the base's basic mission changed. When Randolph Field began to function as a training site in 1931, March Field became an operational base. Before the end of the year, the 7th Bombardment Group, commanded by Major Carl A. Spaatz, brought its Curtiss B-2 Condor and Keystone B-3A bombers to the airfield. The activation of the 17th Pursuit Group and several subordinate units along with the arrival of the 1st Bombardment Wing initiated a period where March Field became associated with the Air Corps' heaviest aircraft as well as an assortment of fighters. Aircraft on March's flightline in the 1930s included Keystone B-4, Martin B-10/B-12 and Douglas B-18 Bolo bombers; Boeing P-12, P-26 Peashooter, and Curtiss P-36 Hawk pursuit aircraft; Northrop A-17A dive bombers and Douglas O-38 observation aircraft.

In the decade before World War II, March Field took on much of its current appearance and also began to gain prominence. Lieutenant Colonel Henry H. (Hap) Arnold, base commander from 1931 to 1936, began a series of well-publicized maneuvers to gain public attention. This resulted in a visit by Governor James Rolph in March 1932, numerous visits by Hollywood celebrities including Bebe Daniels, Wallace Beery, Rochelle Hudson and others, and visits by famous aviators including Amelia Earhart. Articles in Los Angeles newspapers also kept March Field in the news and brought to it considerable public attention.

Beginning in April 1933, hundreds of Civilian Conservation Corps (C.C.C.) recruits began arriving at March Field every day. They totaled over 7000 by July of that year. They were housed in tent camps while waiting for permanent facilities to be constructed. That summer, at the direction of Malin Craig, Air Corps activities at the field were essentially placed on hold while the C.C.C. program got under way, under Hap Arnold's direct oversight.

The completion of the first phase of permanent buildings in 1934 added to the scenic quality of the base.

=== World War II ===
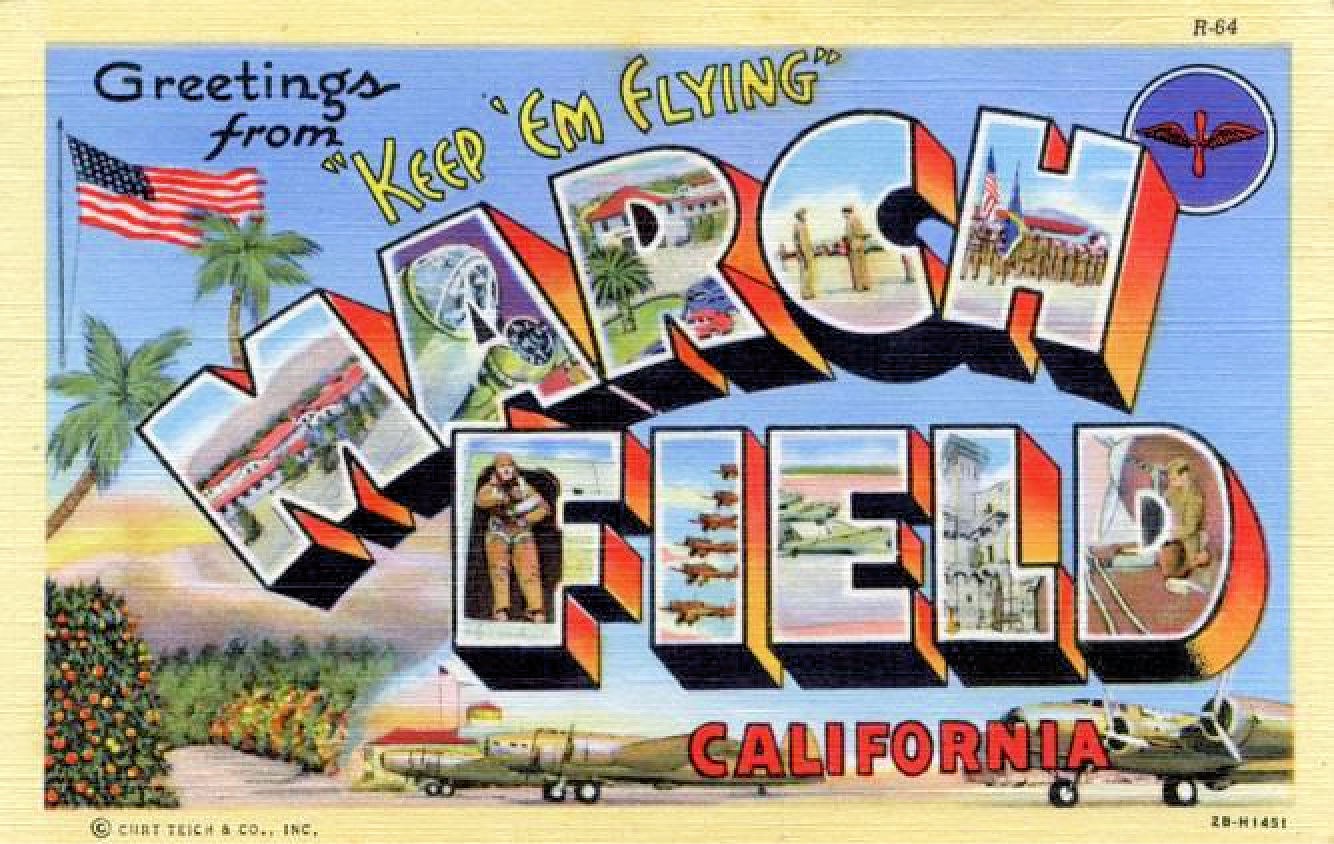
World War II March Field Postcard

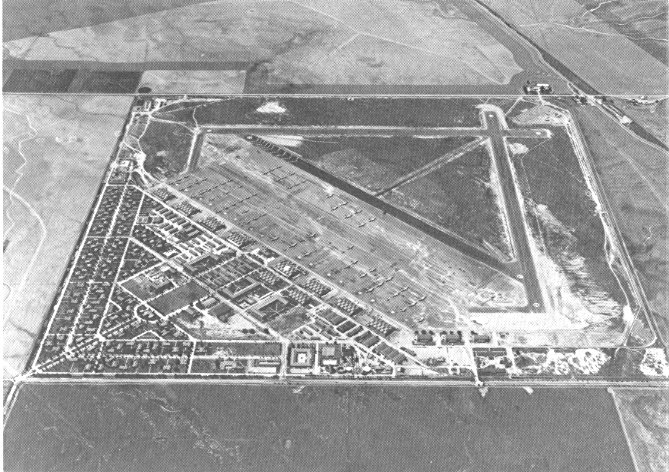
Oblique aerial photo of March Field in May 1940, just before World War II, looking north to south

The Attack on Pearl Harbor in December 1941 quickly brought March Field back into the business of training aircrews. Throughout World War II, many soon-to-be-famous bombardment groups performed their final training at March before embarking for duty in the Pacific. Known sub-bases and auxiliaries used for training were:

- Buffalo Springs Airport 33°24′17″N 118°24′58″W
- Needles Army Airfield 34°45′55″N 114°37′28″W
- Shavers Summit Army Airfield 33°39′54″N 115°42′36″W

On a lighter note, entertainer Bob Hope's first USO show was held at March on 6 May 1941. He had been asked to do this show on location by his radio producer Albert Capstaff, whose brother was stationed there. Jack Benny later originated his own radio program from March Field on 11 January 1942.

=== Postwar era ===
==== Tactical Air Command ====
After the war, March was assigned to the new Tactical Air Command (TAC) as part of the postwar reorganization of the Army Air Force. March was allocated to TAC's Twelfth Air Force. The first TAC unit to be assigned was the 1st Fighter Group, under the command of Colonel Frank S. Perego, being reactivated at March on 3 July 1946, replacing and absorbing the assets of the wartime 412th Fighter Group. At the time of its activation, the group's three squadrons (the 27th, 71st, and 94th Fighter Squadrons) flew Lockheed P-80 Shooting Star (after 11 June 1948 F-80), America's first operational jet fighter.

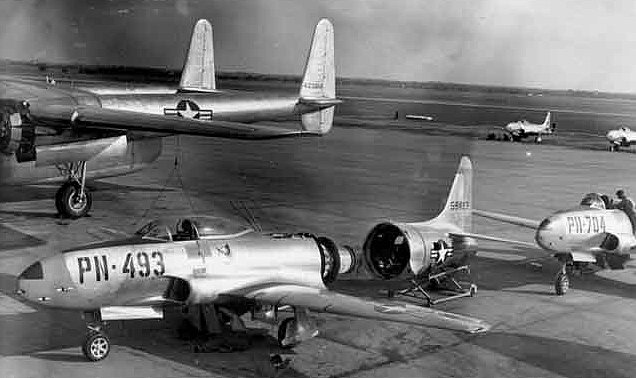
Lockheed F-80s of the 1st Fighter Group, 1949. F-80C 49-493 undergoing maintenance, and F-80B 45-8704 behind it. 45-8704 is now on permanent display at the Aerospace Museum of California, located at the former McClellan AFB, near Sacramento.

Few members of the 1st Fighter Group foresaw subsequent difficulties in the summer of 1946 as they trained with their new jet fighters. The 412th had reported in the summer of 1945 that the P-80 would be well suited for bomber escort, counterair, and ground support. The 1st Fighter Group trained for these and other possible strategic and tactical missions. Pilot inexperience and mechanical difficulties combined to give the P-80 a high accident rate, while parts shortages curtailed operational training. Even so, the 1st Fighter Group maintained a heavy schedule of demonstration flights that served to introduce the fighter to a curious public.

On 15 August 1947, the 1st Fighter Wing was activated as part of AAF Regulation 20-15, "Reorganization of AAF Base Units and Installations," on 27 June 1947. This regulation, which laid out what became known as the Hobson Plan, prescribed a standard organizational setup for all Army Air Force bases worldwide. In 1947, the 67th Tactical Reconnaissance Group (later Wing) was activated as part of a service-wide, wing-base test and assigned to March. When the wing was activated, only the 67th Reconnaissance Group was fully operational. The group was equipped with FA-26 Invaders (RB-26 after 1948) and Lockheed FP-80s (RF-80s after 1948) and was integrated with the 1st Fighter Wing, performing a wide array of day and night photographic missions in southern California. Budget constraints, though, resulted in the wing's inactivation in March 1949.

==== Continental Air Command ====
In December 1948, Twelfth Air Force and March AFB were assigned from Tactical Air Command to Continental Air Command (ConAC), established on 1 December 1948. ConAC assumed jurisdiction over both TAC and the Air Defense Command (ADC). This move reflected an effort to concentrate all fighter forces deployed within the continental United States to strengthen the air defense of the North American continent.

The creation of ConAC was largely an administrative convenience: the units assigned to ConAC were dual-trained and expected to revert to their primary strategic or tactical roles after the air defense battle was won. The 1st Fighter Wing was subsequently transferred from Twelfth Air Force/TAC to Fourth Air Force/ ConAC on 20 December 1948. The first F-86As, assigned to the 94th Fighter Squadron, arrived on 15 February 1949. By the end of June the wing had received seventy-nine of its eighty-three authorized F-86s.

==== Strategic Air Command ====
On 1 May 1949, March became a part of the Strategic Air Command (SAC) and the Fifteenth Air Force (15AF). On 10 May, the 22d Bombardment Wing (22 BW) was reassigned to March from Smoky Hill Air Force Base, Kansas. The 22d was equipped with the Boeing B-29 Superfortress. The 1st Fighter Wing was subsequently attached to the 22 BW on 1 July as the 22d Wing's headquarters was initially non-operational and its operational components were detached so it shared a commander with the 1st Fighter Wing. The 22d Bomb Wing became operational on 1 May 1949 and the 1st Fighter Wing was attached to it with both wings sharing the same commanding officer.

The new F-86A fighter developed numerous teething troubles during its first months of service, but 1st Fighter Group mechanics gradually overcame these difficulties. When the squadrons found themselves able to launch large formations on schedule, they competed to establish various formation records. The purpose of this exercise became clear in early January 1950, when the 1st Fighter Group deployed a sizable contingent of aircraft to participate in the filming of the RKO Pictures film Jet Pilot. The group claimed a final formation record on 4 January when it passed a twenty-four plane formation (consisting of eight aircraft from each squadron) "before the cameras." (Note: The film was not released to theaters until October 1957, by which time the F-86A was obsolete).

The 1st Fighter Group formed its own aerial demonstration team in January 1950. The team, dubbed the "Sabre Dancers", was composed of five members of the 27th Fighter Squadron. The Sabre Dancers made what was probably their most widely viewed flight on 22 April 1950, when they performed before an Armed Forces Day audience at Eglin AFB, Florida, that included President Harry S. Truman, most of his Cabinet, and numerous other political leaders.

On 16 April 1950, the 1st Fighter Wing was redesignated as the 1st Fighter-Interceptor Wing. On 30 June 1950, the 1st Fighter-Interceptor Group was assigned to the 1st Fighter-Interceptor Wing, which was itself assigned to Fifteenth Air Force and SAC. On 1 July the wing was relieved from assignment to Fifteenth Air Force and SAC and assigned to the Fourth Air Force and ConAC. Two days later the wing issued orders establishing advanced parties of its headquarters and component organizations at Victorville (later George) AFB, California. The wing made its permanent change of station move to Victorville on 18 July.

=== Korean War ===
Detached from the wing, the 22d Bombardment Group deployed its B-29s in early July 1950 to Kadena AB, Okinawa, where it came under control of FEAF Bomber Command (Provisional). On 13 July, the group flew its first mission, against the marshaling yards and oil refinery at Wonsan, North Korea. By 21 October, it had amassed fifty-seven missions against the enemy, attacking bridges, factories, industrial targets, troop concentrations, airfields, marshaling yards, communications centers, and port facilities. During four months of combat in the Korean War, the group flew 335 sorties with only fourteen aborts and dropped over 6,500 tons of bombs. It redeployed to the United States in late October and November 1950.

On 2 January 1951, the 44th Bombardment Wing was activated and assigned to Fifteenth Air Force. It was equipped with refurbished B-29 and TB-29 bombers drawn from mothballed World War II storage at Pyote AFB in Texas and Davis-Monthan AFB in Arizona. It was reassigned to the 12th Air Division of Fifteenth Air Force on 10 February 1951, and then the 21st Air Division within Fifteenth Air Force on 4 August 1951. The Wing moved to Lake Charles Air Force Station, Louisiana, on 1 August 1951.

On 28 March 1951, the California Air National Guard 106th Bombardment Group was activated to federal service at March and put on active duty. The group was initially equipped with refurbished B-29s and its mission was to train reservists to backfill rotating B-29 combat crews serving in Korea. While the reservists were undergoing training they were paid on the lesser reserve pay scale. The group was redesignated as the 320th Bombardment Wing replacing the 106th in December 1952. At March, the wing conducted global bombardment training and air refueling operations to meet SAC commitments. Trained B-47 cadre for 96th Bombardment Wing, Medium, December 1953 – January 1955. Deployed as a wing to RAF Brize Norton, England, 5 June – 4 September 1954, and Andersen AFB, Guam, 5 October 1956 – 11 January 1957. The 320th was inactivated on 15 December 1960. Also during the Korean War, the Air Force Reserve 330th Bombardment Group was ordered to active duty on 1 May 1951 at March. The 330th flew borrowed B-29s from the 106th Bomb Group to train the reservists on the aircraft. The group was inactivated on 16 June and its personnel were sent to bases in Japan and Okinawa as replacements for active-duty personnel with B-29 groups.

=== Cold War ===
Following the return of the 22d Bombardment Group from Korea, the wing trained for proficiency in global strategic bombardment, and in 1952, the wing took delivery of Boeing KC-97 tankers, adding aerial refueling to its mission. The following year, the wing retired its B-29 fleet and replaced them with the jet-powered Boeing B-47 Stratojet. In 1957, 22d Wing aircrews flew the longest non-stop mass flight in history: 5,840 miles (9,400 km) from England to California. General Archie Old, the Fifteenth Air Force commander, led a flight of three B-52 Stratofortresses in a flight around the world. The wing deployed to RAF Upper Heyford, England from December 1953 to March 1954.

In 1960, the 452d Troop Carrier Wing was activated at March. This established the presence of the Air Force Reserve on the base with their Fairchild C-119 Flying Boxcars. The wing was not tactically operational from 11 March to 15 September 1963, while the 2nd Bombardment Squadron converted to Boeing B-52B bombers and KC-135 jet tankers replaced the KC-97s. In 1966, the 2d Bomb Squadron converted to the B-52D and gained a commitment to forward deploy to the Pacific and engage in combat during the Vietnam War. In 1966, the wing absorbed the B-52Ds and added the 486th Bombardment Squadron from the inactivating 340th Bombardment Wing at Bergstrom Air Force Base, Texas when Bergstrom converted to a TAC fighter/reconnaissance base. The addition of a second tanker and bomber squadron made the 22d a "Super" wing.

=== Vietnam War ===
From March to October 1967 the 22d wing was reduced to a small "rear-echelon" non-tactical organization with all tactical resources and most support resources loaned to SAC organizations involved in combat operations in Southeast Asia from U-Tapao, Thailand and Andersen AFB, Guam.

The wing continued to support SAC operations in the Far East and Southeast Asia through 1975, and from April 1972 to October 1973 the wing again had all its bomber resources loaned to other organizations for combat and contingency operations. Its KC-135 resources were also on loan from April to September 1972; afterwards, a few tankers returned to wing control.

=== Refueling mission ===
The 22d maintained a strategic bombardment alert posture from 1973 to 1982, but in 1978 it added conventional warfare missions, including mine-laying and sea reconnaissance/surveillance. After the retirement of the B-52D in 1982, the 22d Bombardment Wing was renamed the 22d Air Refueling Wing and re-equipped with new KC-10A Extenders (based on the DC-10 airliner), making the 22d the third Air Force unit to operate the giant new tankers, behind Barksdale and Seymour Johnson AFBs. Two months later, the wing lost its bomber mission and became the 22d Air Refueling Wing.

The 22d used the KC-10A's cargo, passenger, and fuel load capacity to provide support during the evacuation of U.S. nationals as part of the invasion of Grenada in 1983. In December 1989, the wing's 22d Air Refueling Squadron inactivated and all its KC-135A Stratotankers were retired or transferred to other SAC bases. This left the KC-10-equipped 6th and 9th ARS as the wing's only flying squadrons. The base was listed on the National Priorities List as a Superfund site on 21 November 1989.

=== Post-Cold War era ===
In July 1990, the 163d Tactical Fighter Group changed missions and was re-designated the 163rd Tactical Reconnaissance Group, equipped with RF-4C Phantom II aircraft. The 22 ARW supported F-117 deployments to Saudi Arabia and contributed aircraft and personnel to logistics efforts in support of the liberation of Kuwait from 1990 to 1991. On 1 June 1992, a major Air Force reorganization resulted in the disestablishment of the Strategic Air Command. The 22d ARW was assigned to the new Air Mobility Command, and from the end of 1992 to 1994, the wing flew humanitarian airlift missions to Somalia. It also provided air refueling in support of deployments to Haiti in 1994.

=== Air Force Reserve ===
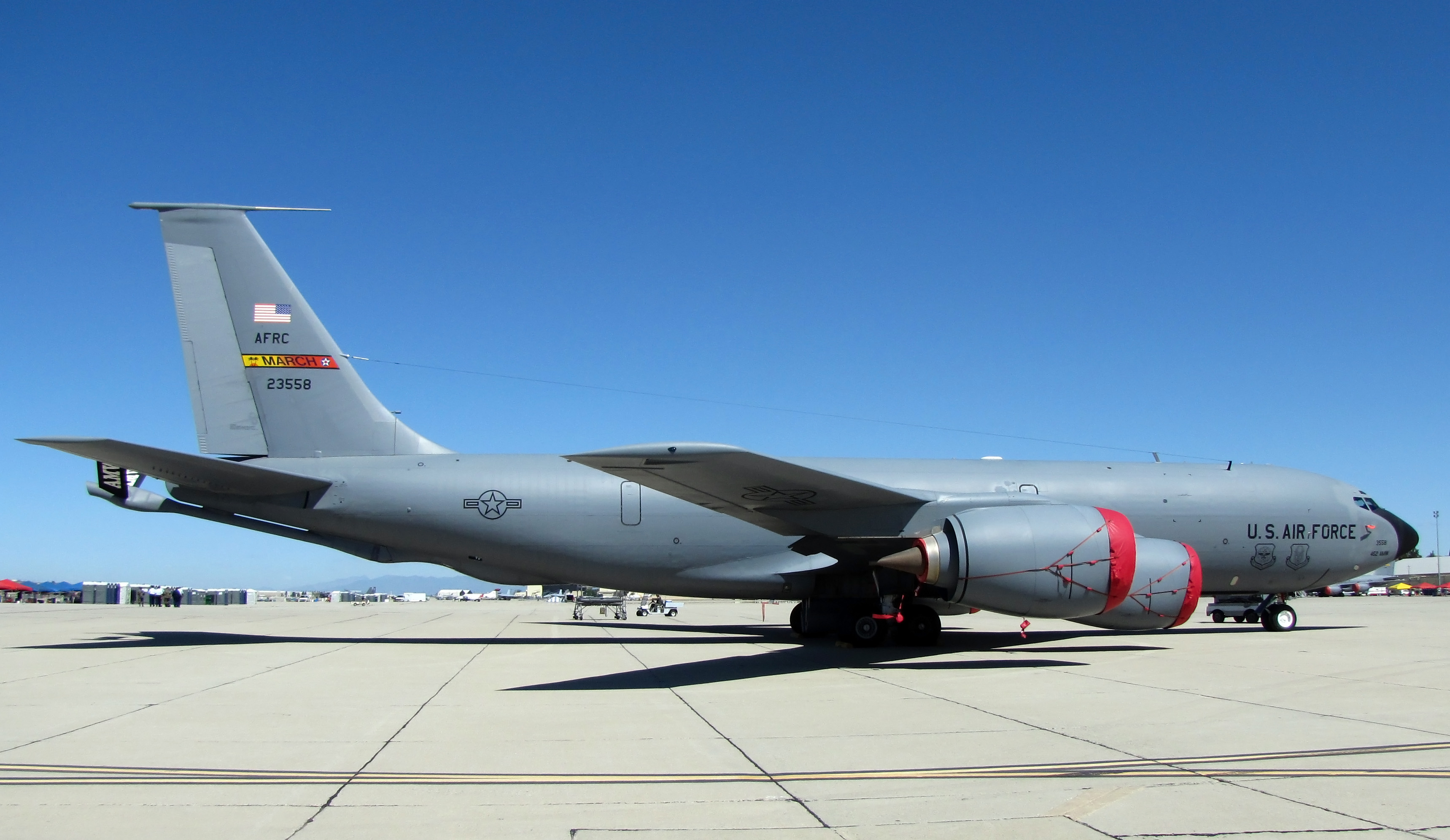
A KC-135 Refueling Tanker at March

In March 1993, March was chosen for realignment under the Base Realignment and Closure [BRAC] III with an effective date of 31 March 1996. In August 1993, the 445th Military Airlift Wing transferred to March from the closing Norton AFB in nearby San Bernardino. On 3 January 1994, the 22d Air Refueling Wing was reassigned without aircraft to McConnell AFB, Kansas, replacing the inactivating 384th Bomb Wing. The Air Mobility Command's 722d Air Refueling Wing stood up at March and absorbed the assets of the reassigned 22d. March's KC-10A aircraft assets would later be transferred to the 60th Airlift Wing, redesignated as the 60th Air Mobility Wing, at Travis AFB, California.

Due to realignment, the 445th Military Airlift Wing was transferred to the 452d Air Refueling Wing operating the KC-135 Stratotanker which was redesignated the 452d Air Mobility Wing (452 AMW) on 1 April 1994. At approximately the same time, the 163d Tactical Reconnaissance Group also changed mission and became the 163rd Air Refueling Wing (163 ARW), operating the Boeing KC-135. On 1 April 1996, March officially became March Air Reserve Base under the Air Force Reserve Command (AFRC), ending a 78-year active duty military presence.

In 2005, the 452nd retired the venerable C-141 Starlifter and commenced transition to the C-17 Globemaster III as the first AFRC unit to operate the aircraft as an independent wing not associated with an active duty C-17 wing. March is currently home to nine C-17 Globemaster IIIs, which belong strictly to the Air Force Reserve Command, as well as twelve KC-135R Stratotankers. The tankers were the first in the Air Force Reserve to convert to the Block 40 Pacer CRAG modernization upgrade.

In 2007, the 163rd also saw a change in mission, transferring its KC-135R aircraft to other Air Force, Air Force Reserve and Air National Guard units, with the majority of its aircraft transferred to the 452 AMW at March. The unit was then redesignated as the 163d Reconnaissance Wing (163 RW), operating the MQ-1 Predator unmanned aerial system. With this change, the 163 RW also changed operational claiamncy from Air Mobility Command (AMC) to Air Combat Command (ACC).

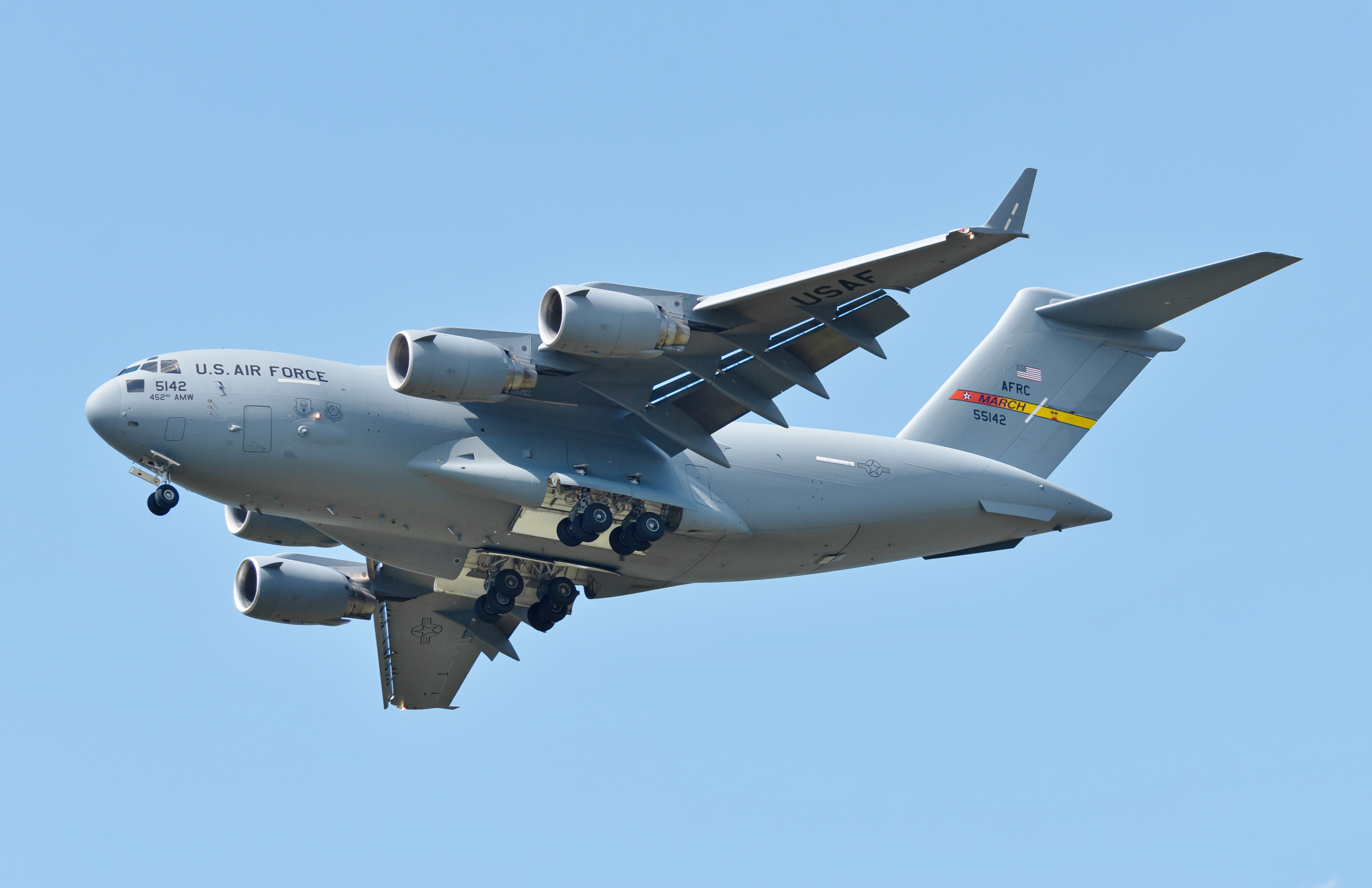
A C-17 Globemaster III stationed at March

In 2010, the 912th Air Refueling Squadron (912 ARS) was reactivated and assigned to March. An active duty squadron of the Regular Air Force and the Air Mobility Command (AMC), the 912 ARS will be part of the 452 AMW under the "Active Associate" concept, working in tandem with the Air Force Reserve Command's 336th Air Refueling Squadron and 452nd Maintenance Group, while remaining under the administrative control of the 92nd Air Refueling Wing (92 ARW) at Fairchild AFB, Washington. This is an example of Total Force Integration at work.

On July 31, 2015, the 4th Combat Camera Squadron was inactivated due to defense budget cuts. The 4th Combat Camera Squadron stood up at March in 1996 as the only combat camera squadron in the Air Force Reserve. The squadron documented more than 350 worldwide combat, humanitarian, expeditionary and training missions with still photography and video, both on the ground and aerial missions.

On January 20, 2017, the flight transporting Former President Barack Obama and his family after he left office was diverted to March after a storm shut off access to Palm Springs International Airport.

Later that year, the 1st Combat Camera Squadron Operating Location Charlie was established as an aerial combat camera unit to cover the PACAF area of responsibility. This active duty unit deployed to several locations during its time to include the CENTCOM AOR as well as AFRICOM AOR. This unit also provided video and photo coverage of the post battle damage assessment from the January 6th, 2020 attack from Al-Shabaab forces in Kenya. In September 30th, 2020, the unit was shut down and consolidated back to the 1st Combat Camera Squadron in South Carolina.

In early 2020, the base was used to screen 210 individuals who had been evacuated from China due to the COVID-19 pandemic.

In January 2022, March was proposed to get 12 KC-46 Pegasus refueling jets for the US Air Force Reserve, however, these will also be shared with at least one active duty unit, according to Rep. Ken Calvert, (R-Calif). "March is expected to begin operating the new aircraft in 2025 and the unit will be fully operational by 2027," according to Sen. Dianne Feinstein, (D-Calif.)

=== Major commands to which assigned ===
- United States Army Air Service, 6 March 1918 – April 1923
- United States Army Air Corps, March 1927 – 1 March 1935
- General Headquarters (GHQ) Air Force, 1 March 1935 – 31 March 1941
- Fourth Air Force, 31 March 1941 – 13 April 1945
- Continental Air Forces, 13 April 1945 – 21 March 1946
- Strategic Air Command, 21 March 1946 – 1 April 1946
- Tactical Air Command, 1 April 1946 – 1 December 1948
- Continental Air Command, 1 December 1948 – 1 May 1949
- Strategic Air Command, 1 May 1949 – 1 June 1992
- Air Combat Command, 1 June 1992 – 30 June 1996
- Air Force Reserve Command, 1 July 1996–present

=== Major historical units assigned ===
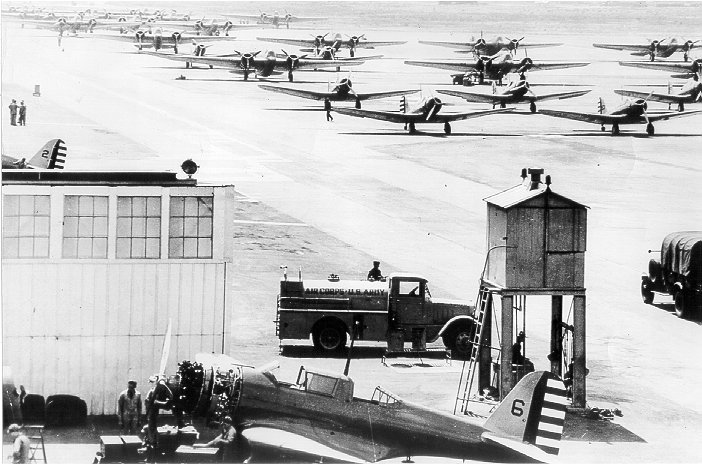
Northrop A-17As and Martin B-10s on the flightline

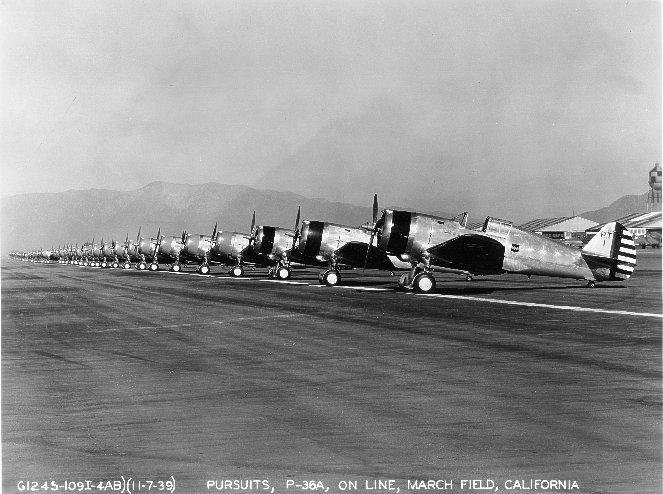
Curtiss P-36A Hawks of the 20th Pursuit Group, 7 November 1939

United States Army Air Service (1918–1923)

- Det, 818th Aero Sq, 1 March 1918 – 22 July 1919
- 9th Aero Squadron, 22 July – 11 December 1919
- 23d Aero Squadron, 1 October 1921 – 21 March 1922
- 19th Aero Squadron, 1 October 1921 – 29 June 1922

United States Army Air Corps (1927–1941)

- 11th Bomb Squadron, 3 June – 31 July 1927
- 95th Pursuit Squadron (95th Reconnaissance Squadron), 7 June – 31 July 1927
- 44th Observation Squadron, 25 June – 31 July 1927
- 13th School Group, 31 July 1927 – 30 April 1931
- 7th Bombardment Group, 29 October 1931 – 4 December 1934
- 17th Pursuit (Later Bombardment) Group, 15 July 1931 – 24 June 1940
- 19th Bombardment Group, 25 October 1935 – 4 June 1941
- 30th Bombardment Group, 15 January – 20 May 1941
- 41st Bombardment Group, 15 January – 20 May 1941
- 14th Pursuit Group, 10 June 1941 – 7 February 1942
- 51st Pursuit Group, 10 June 1941 – 7 February 1942
- 32nd Bombardment Squadron
- 34th Attack Squadron
- 38th (later 427th) Reconnaissance Squadron
- 73rd Attack Squadron

United States Army Air Forces (1941–1947)

- 30th Bombardment Group, 11 March 1942 – 28 September 1943
- 20th Fighter Group, 4 January – 11 August 1943
- 453rd Bombardment Group, 1 October – 2 December 1943
- 479th Fighter Group, 28 October 1943 – 7 April 1944
- 473d Fighter Group, 1 November 1943 – 31 March 1944
- 399th Bombardment Group, 3 December 1943 – 31 March 1944
- 420th Army Air Force Base Unit, 1 April 1944 – 9 April 1946

United States Air Force (1947–1996)

- 1st Fighter Group, 1 April 1946 – 15 August 1947

Established as: 1st Fighter Wing (later Fighter-Interceptor Wing), 15 August 1947 – 18 July 1950

- 67th Tactical Reconnaissance Group, 25 July – 25 November 1947

Established as: 67th Tactical Reconnaissance Wing, 25 November 1947 – 28 March 1949

- 22d Bombardment Wing, 10 May 1949 – 1 October 1982

Re-designated: 22d Air Refueling Wing, 1 October 1982 – 1 January 1994

- Fifteenth Air Force, 7 November 1949 – 1 January 1992
- 330th Bombardment Wing, 25 June 1949 – 16 June 1951
- 15th Air Force 7 November 1949 – 1 January 1992
- 44th Bombardment Wing, 2 January – 1 August 1951

- 12th Air Division, 10 February 1951 – 1 January 1962
- 106th Bombardment Group, 28 March 1951 – 1 December 1952
- 320th Bombardment Wing, 1 December 1952 – 15 December 1960
- 452d Troop Carrier (later Military Airlift) Wing (AFRES), 1 November 1960 – 1 January 1972
- 452d Tactical Airlift (later Air Refueling) Wing (AFRES), 1 January 1976 – 1 April 1994
- Southwest Air Defense Sector, 1 July 1987 – 31 December 1994
- 445th Military Airlift Wing (AFRES), 30 March 1994 – 1 May 1994

United States Air Force Reserve (1996 – present)

- 4th Combat Camera Squadron, 1 July 1996 – 31 July 2015

=== Possible redevelopment ===
The former March AFB land no longer needed as a result of the downsizing was given to the March Joint Powers Authority, a commission that represents the county and the base's adjoining cities. A prime example was the former SAC B-52 and KC-135 Alert Facility on the south end of the airfield. This land, now called March GlobalPort, has been developed as an air cargo center and in 2004 it was announced that air freight corporation DHL/ ABX Air was considering the base for its new Southern California hub. Competition from nearby San Bernardino International Airport (formerly Norton AFB) and Ontario International Airport, as well as opposition from residents of fast-growing Riverside and Moreno Valley, significantly reduced the viability of the March GlobalPort location. Yet despite this drawbacks, DHL / ABX Air announced on 10 December 2004 that it had chosen March as its preferred site. On 15 December 2004, DHL signed a 16-year joint-use agreement with the March Joint Powers Authority, with the company's operation expected to ultimately employ 250 to 300 workers and operate 16 cargo flights per day.

By November 2008, severe competition and a weakening global economy forced DHL to announce that it would close its March GlobalPort facility by early 2009 due to low profitability. This was part of a greater DHL business model which entailed completely shutting down all domestic shipping within the US. A new commercial tenant for the March GlobalPort facility has yet to be determined.

Additional proposals to convert March Air Reserve Base into a joint civil-military public use airport have also been a topic of discussion. However, multiple issues have continued to draw this proposal into question. An original plan had the March Joint Powers Authority signing an agreement to convert March into a joint-use civil-military airport, sharing facilities between the military, DHL and the public. However, DHL's recent retrenchment from their facility at March significantly impacted the viability of such a proposal. Conversion of March into a joint civil-military facility for general aviation beyond the USAF-operated March Aero Club, as well as possible regional airline operations, has also been the subject of public protest and debate due to the potential increase in noise pollution, interference with military operations and the lack of a definitive funding stream for expanded civilian flight operations at March ARB, to include ground traffic/transportation infrastructure and requisite TSA security enhancements.

Amazon Air added March ARB to its service toward the end of 2018, with up to six flights a day. It ceased operations in May 2025.

== March Inland Port Airport ==
The March Inland Port Airport Authority manages 350 acres in the southern portion of March Air Reserve Base for civilian use at this dual use military facility

Civilian operations are limited to 21,000 operations annually. Military operations have priority

Currently the Airport averages four thousand operations per year

=== Airlines and destinations ===
==== Cargo ====
Airlines	Destinations
Amazon Air	Allentown, Baltimore, Boise, Charlotte, Honolulu,

== Accidents and incidents ==
- On June 27, 1954, a USAF Boeing KC-97 Stratofreighter crashed into Box Springs Mountain 8 km north of March AFB. The aircraft was diverting to San Bernardino-Norton AFB because of poor weather conditions at March AFB. The plane impacted a mountain and crashed on a boulder-strewn ridge. All 14 occupants were killed.
- On 19 October 1978, a B-52 crashed on takeoff on the south side of the runway, killing 5 on board and injured the tailgunner.
- On July 17, 1985, a NASA Convair 990 Coronado blew a tire on its takeoff roll and aborted at 140 kts. It tried to clear the runway, but a fire broke out because a fuel tank ruptured. All 19 occupants survived, but the aircraft was destroyed and written off.
- On July 30, 1988, a Learjet 23 operated by Jet Management on final approach rolled, inverted, and crashed at March AFB because of known aircraft deficiences before the flight. Both occupants died.

== Demographics ==
Historical population
Census	Pop.	Note	%±
1970	2,002		—
1980	3,607		80.2%
1990	5,523		53.1%
2000	370		−93.3%
2010	1,159		213.2%
2020	809		−30.2%
U.S. Decennial Census; 1860–1870 1880-1890; 1900 1910 1920; 1930 1940 1950; 1960 1970 1980; 1990 2000 2010

March AFB first appeared as an unincorporated place in the 1970 U.S. census; and was listed as a census designated place in the 1980 U.S. census.

=== Racial and ethnic composition ===
March ARB CDP, California – Racial and ethnic composition Note: the US Census treats Hispanic/Latino as an ethnic category. This table excludes Latinos from the racial categories and assigns them to a separate category. Hispanics/Latinos may be of any race.
Race / Ethnicity (NH = Non-Hispanic)	Pop 2000	Pop 2010	Pop 2020	% 2000	% 2010	% 2020
White alone (NH)	217	748	408	58.65%	64.54%	50.43%
Black or African American alone (NH)	66	167	120	17.84%	14.41%	14.83%
Native American or Alaska Native alone (NH)	2	6	2	0.54%	0.52%	0.25%
Asian alone (NH)	17	35	54	4.59%	3.02%	6.67%
Native Hawaiian or Pacific Islander alone (NH)	2	2	4	0.54%	0.17%	0.49%
Other race alone (NH)	0	0	10	0.00%	0.00%	1.24%
Mixed race or Multiracial (NH)	22	29	23	5.95%	2.50%	2.84%
Hispanic or Latino (any race)	44	172	188	11.89%	14.84%	23.24%
Total	370	1,159	809	100.00%	100.00%	100.00%

=== Geography ===
March ARB is located at 33.889°N 117.260°W (33.889, −117.260). According to the United States Census Bureau, the base has a total area of 12.0 square miles (31 km^{2}), all of it land.

The United States Census Bureau has designated the base as its own census-designated place for statistical purposes. It had a population of 809 at the 2020 census, down from 1,159 at the 2010 census. The ZIP code is 92518 and the area code 951.

=== 2020 census ===
The 2020 United States census reported that the census-designated place had a population of 809. The population density was 67.9 inhabitants per square mile (26.2/km^{2}). The racial makeup of March ARB was 454 (56.1%) White, 124 (15.3%) African American, 2 (0.2%) Native American, 54 (6.7%) Asian, 4 (0.5%) Pacific Islander, 79 (9.8%) from other races, and 92 (11.4%) from two or more races. Hispanic or Latino of any race were 188 persons (23.2%).

The census reported that 767 people (94.8% of the population) lived in households, 6 (0.7%) lived in non-institutionalized group quarters, and 36 (4.4%) were institutionalized.

There were 474 households, out of which 52 (11.0%) had children under the age of 18 living in them, 119 (25.1%) were married-couple households, 13 (2.7%) were cohabiting couple households, 128 (27.0%) had a female householder with no partner present, and 214 (45.1%) had a male householder with no partner present. 303 households (63.9%) were one person, and 177 (37.3%) were one person aged 65 or older. The average household size was 1.62. There were 159 families (33.5% of all households).

The age distribution was 95 people (11.7%) under the age of 18, 27 people (3.3%) aged 18 to 24, 131 people (16.2%) aged 25 to 44, 203 people (25.1%) aged 45 to 64, and 353 people (43.6%) who were 65 years of age or older. The median age was 61.5 years. For every 100 females, there were 124.1 males.

There were 786 housing units at an average density of 65.9 units per square mile (25.4 units/km^{2}), of which 474 (60.3%) were occupied. Of these, 3 (0.6%) were owner-occupied, and 471 (99.4%) were occupied by renters.

As of the census of 2000, the median income for a household in the base was $31,364, and the median income for a family was $30,455. Males had a median income of $40,625 versus $17,321 for females. The per capita income for the base was $13,765. About 10.8% of families and 13.1% of the population were below the poverty line, including 19.7% of those under age 18 and none of those age 65 or over.

=== Education ===
No schools exist on-post.

Part of the CDP is in Val Verde Unified School District and part is in Moreno Valley Unified School District.

=== Politics ===
In the California State Legislature, March ARB is in the 32nd senatorial district, represented by Republican Kelly Seyarto, and in the 63rd Assembly district, represented by Republican Natasha Johnson.

In the United States House of Representatives, March ARB is in California's 39th congressional district, represented by Democrat Mark Takano.

== See also ==
- Western Air Defense Force (Air Defense Command)
- California World War II Army Airfields
- March Field Air Museum is located adjacent to but off the grounds of March ARB and displays in its aircraft collection examples bombers, fighters, cargo, refueling and reconnaissance aircraft, many of which served at March Field, March AFB and/or March ARB.
- Distinguished Flying Cross Memorial Miramar
- Riverside National Cemetery is a military cemetery located west of the base and created from land formerly belonging to the base. It is home to one of the four U.S.-recognized Medal of Honor memorial sites.
- List of Training Section Air Service airfields
