= 79th Infantry Division (United States) =

79th Sustainment Command 79th Infantry Division
- 79th Infantry Division Shoulder Sleeve Insignia
- Active: 5 August 1917–2 June 1919; 24 June 1921–11 December 1945; 14 November 1946–30 December 1965; December 1967–1 December 2009 (79th USARC); 1 December 2009–16 September 2017 (79th SSC); 16 September 2017–present (79th TSC)
- Country: United States
- Branch: United States Army Reserve
- Type: Sustainment
- Size: Command
- Part of: United States Army Reserve Command
- Garrison/HQ: Los Alamitos, Calif.
- Nickname: "Cross of Lorraine" (special designation)
- Motto: To Do For Country
- Engagements: World War I; Meuse-Argonne; Lorraine 1918; World War II; Normandy; Northern France; Rhineland; Ardennes-Alsace; Central Europe

Commanders
- Current commander: Major General Todd L. Erskine
- Command Sergeant Major: CSM H.H. Luedtke
- Notable commanders: Ira T. Wyche; Anthony McAuliffe

Insignia
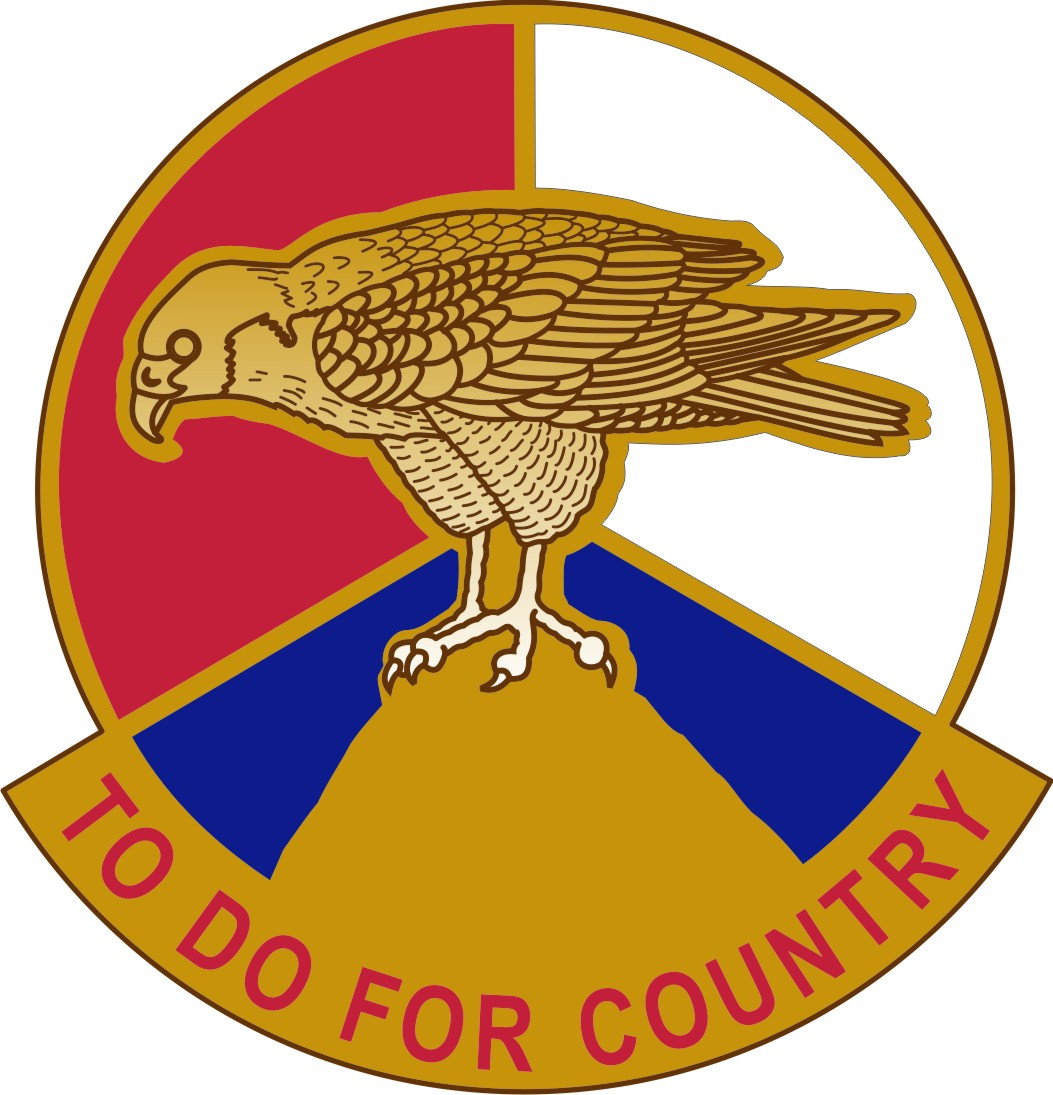
- 79th Sustainment Command DUI

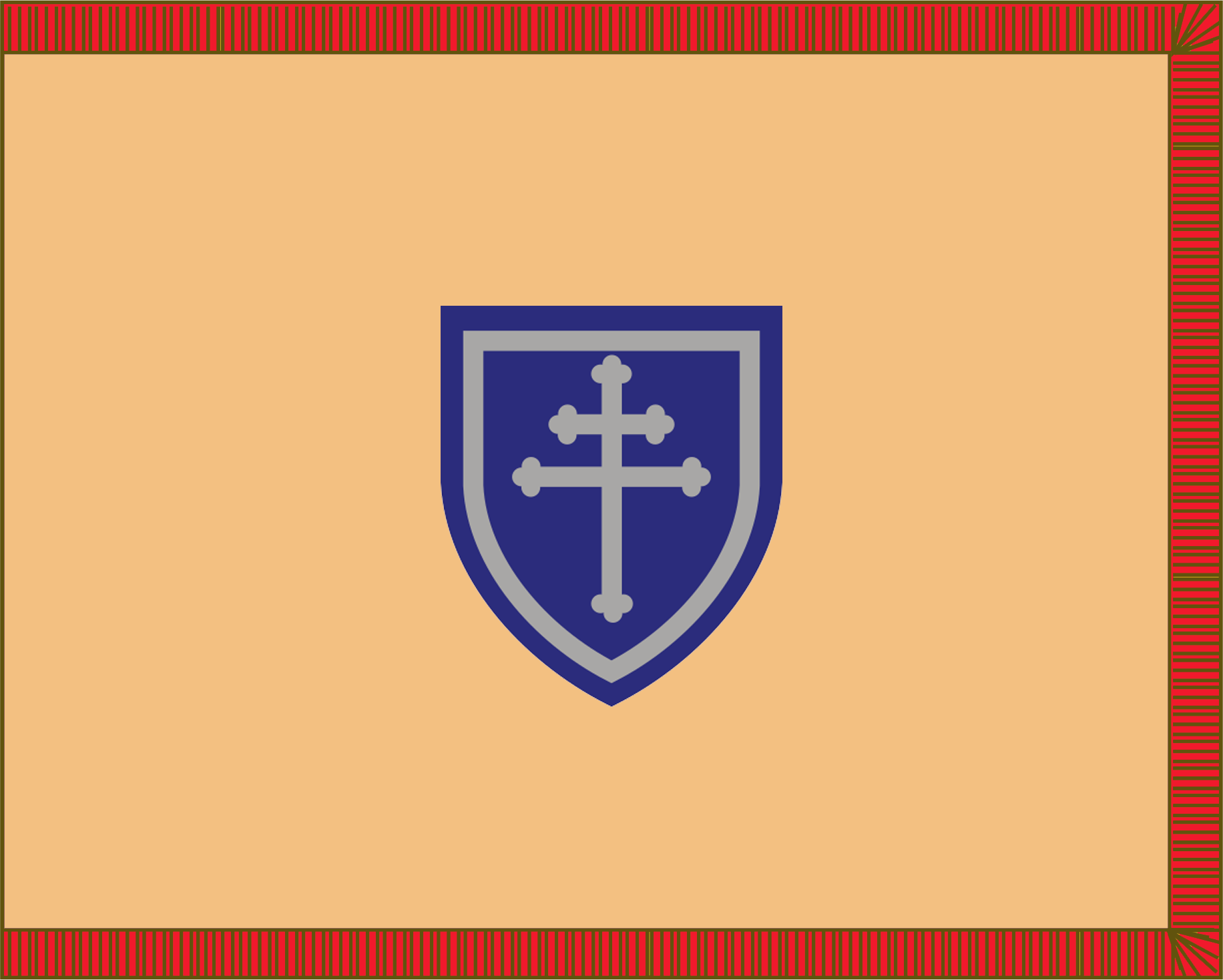
- 79th Theater Sustainment Command Flag

The 79th Infantry Division (formerly known as the 79th Division) was an infantry formation of the United States Army Reserve in World Wars I and II.

Since 2009, it has been active as the 79th Theater Sustainment Command.

== History ==
=== World War I ===
- Activated: August 1917
- Overseas: July 1918
- Major operations: Meuse-Argonne
- Casualties: Total-6,874 (KIA-1,151; WIA-5,723)
- Commanders: Maj. Gen. Joseph E. Kuhn (25 August 1917), Brig. Gen. William Jones Nicholson (26 November 1917), Maj. Gen. Joseph E. Kuhn (17 February 1918), Maj. Gen. Joseph E. Kuhn (16 April 1918), Brig. Gen. W. J. Nicholson (22 May 1918), Maj. Gen. Joseph E. Kuhn (8 June 1918), Brig. Gen. W. J. Nicholson (28 June 1918), Maj. Gen. Joseph E. Kuhn (23 July 1918), Brig. Gen. Evan M. Johnson (29 December 1918), Maj. Gen. Joseph E. Kuhn (31 December 1918), Brig. Gen. Evan M. Johnson (19 January 1919), Brig. Gen. John S. Winn (2 February 1919), Brig. Gen. Andrew Hero Jr. (3 February 1919), Brig. Gen. Evan M. Johnson (9 February 1919), Maj. Gen. Joseph E. Kuhn (28 February 1919), brig. Gen. Evan M. Johnson (16 March 1919), Maj. Gen. Joseph E. Kuhn (30 March 1919), Brig. Gen. John S. Winn (4 May 1919), Maj. Gen. Joseph E. Kuhn (8 May 1919).
- Returned to U.S.: May 1919
- Inactivated: June 1919

==== Order of battle ====
- Headquarters, 79th Division
- 157th Infantry Brigade
  - 313th Infantry Regiment
  - 314th Infantry Regiment
  - 311th Machine Gun Battalion
- 158th Infantry Brigade
  - 315th Infantry Regiment
  - 316th Infantry Regiment
  - 312th Machine Gun Battalion
- 154th Field Artillery Brigade
  - 310th Field Artillery Regiment (75 mm)
  - 311th Field Artillery Regiment (75 mm)
  - 312th Field Artillery Regiment (155 mm)
  - 304th Trench Mortar Battery
- 310th Machine Gun Battalion
- 304th Engineer Regiment
- 304th Field Signal Battalion
- Headquarters Troop, 79th Division
- 304th Train Headquarters and Military Police
  - 304th Ammunition Train
  - 304th Supply Train
  - 304th Engineer Train
  - 304th Sanitary Train
    - 313th, 314th, 315th, and 316th Ambulance Companies and Field Hospitals

==== Combat chronicle ====
Doughboys of the 304th Engineer Regiment, 79th Division, digging in and building a new ration dump on the side of a hill at Samogneux, France, Nov ember 3, 1918.

The division was first activated under the command of Major General Joseph E. Kuhn at Camp Meade, Maryland in August 1917, four months after the American entry into World War I, composed primarily of draftees from Maryland and Pennsylvania.

After almost a year of training the division sailed overseas in July 1918. The 79th Division saw extensive combat in the Meuse-Argonne offensive, which began in late September, area where it earned the name of "Cross of Lorraine" for their defense of France.

The division returned to the United States and was inactivated in June 1919, several months after the Armistice with Germany on November 11, 1918.

Throughout its entire World War I campaign, the division suffered 6,874 casualties with 1,151 killed and 5,723 wounded.

Private Henry Gunther, the last soldier of any nationality to be killed in action during World War I, served with the 313th Infantry Regiment of the 79th Division.

=== Interwar period ===
The 79th Division was reconstituted in the Organized Reserve on 24 June 1921, allotted to the Third Corps Area, and assigned to the XIII Corps. The eastern half of Pennsylvania was allotted to the division as its home area. The headquarters of the “Lorraine Division” was originally organized on 29 September 1921 at the Schuylkill Arsenal, 2620 Gray's Ferry Road in Philadelphia. It was later relocated in 1930 to the Gimbal Building at 35 South Ninth Street. It was again relocated in 1935 to the New Custom House Building at Second and Chestnut Streets and remained there until activated for World War II. After activation, the division's recruiting efforts were such that by 1926, the division was at 85 percent of its authorized strength. To maintain communications with the officers of the division, the division staff published a newsletter, the “79th Division Bulletin.” The newsletter informed the division's members of such things as when and where the inactive training sessions were to be held, what the division's summer training quotas were, where the camps were to be held, and which units would be assigned to help conduct the Citizens Military Training Camps (CMTC). The designated mobilization and training station for the division was Camp George G. Meade, the location where much of the 79th's training activities occurred in the interwar years. The division headquarters usually conducted its summer training there, and on a number of occasions, participated in command post exercises there as well. During these camps, the 79th Division headquarters occasionally trained with the staff of the 16th Infantry Brigade, 8th Division. In May 1929, the 79th Division conducted a "contact camp" at Conneaut Lake, Pennsylvania, and almost 500 of the division's officers attended. The highlight of the camp was an aerial demonstration performed by the 99th Division’s 324th Observation Squadron.

The subordinate infantry regiments of the division held their summer training primarily with the units of the 16th Infantry Brigade. Other units, such as the special troops, artillery, engineers, aviation, medical, and quartermaster trained at various posts in the Second and Third Corps Areas usually with units of the 1st Division or the active elements of the 8th Division. For example, the division's artillery trained with the 16th Field Artillery at Camp Meade; the 304th Engineer Regiment usually trained with the 1st Engineer Regiment at Fort DuPont, Delaware, or the 13th Engineer Regiment at Camp Humphreys, Virginia; the 304th Medical Regiment trained with the 1st Medical Regiment at Carlisle Barracks, Pennsylvania; and the 304th Observation Squadron trained with the 99th Observation Squadron at Bolling Field, Washington, D.C. In addition to the unit training camps, the infantry regiments of the division rotated responsibility to conduct the CMTC training held at Camp Meade each year. On a number of occasions, the division participated in Third Corps Area or First Army CPXs in conjunction with other Regular Army, National Guard, and Organized Reserve units. Perhaps the division's most ambitious CPX was a division-level exercise conducted around the clock for almost 2 weeks from 31 July to 12 August 1938. In January 1940, many officers of the 79th Division headquarters attended a week of additional annual training performed by the 28th Division; the training was part of a War Department-directed effort to increase the readiness of National Guard units that winter. The 79th Division officers voluntarily participated in the training without pay. Unlike Regular Army and National Guard units in the Third Corps Area, the 79th Division did not participate in the Third Corps Area maneuvers and the First Army maneuvers of 1935, 1939, and 1940 as an organized unit due to lack of enlisted personnel and equipment. Instead, the officers and a few enlisted reservists were assigned to Regular and Guard units to fill vacant slots and bring the units up to war strength for the exercises. Additionally, some were assigned duties as umpires or as support personnel.

=== World War II ===
- Ordered into active military service: 15 June 1942 at Camp Pickett, Virginia
- Trained at Camp Laguna in California in 1943.
- Overseas: 7 April 1944
- Campaigns: Normandy, Northern France, Rhineland, Ardennes-Alsace, Central Europe
- Days of combat: 248
- Distinguished Unit Citations: 8
- Awards: Medal of Honor-3; Distinguished Service Cross (United States)-13; Distinguished Service Medal (United States)-1; Silver Star-962; Legion of Merit-11; Soldier's Medal-27; Bronze Star-4,916; Air Medal-78
- Commanders: Major General Ira T. Wyche (June 1942 – May 1945), Brigadier General Leroy H. Watson (May–July 1945), Major General Anthony C. McAuliffe (July–August 1945), Brigadier General Leroy H. Watson (August 1945 to inactivation).
- Returned to U.S.: 10 December 1945.
- Inactivated: 20 December 1945, Camp Kilmer, New Jersey.
- Reactivated: (Organized Reserve division 29 November 1946).

==== Mobilization ====
Before Organized Reserve infantry divisions were ordered into active military service, they were reorganized on paper as "triangular" divisions under the 1940 tables of organization. The headquarters companies of the two infantry brigades were consolidated into the division's cavalry reconnaissance troop, and one infantry regiment was removed by inactivation. The field artillery brigade headquarters and headquarters battery became the headquarters and headquarters battery of the division artillery. Its three field artillery regiments were reorganized into four battalions; one battalion was taken from each of the two 75 mm gun regiments to form two 105 mm howitzer battalions, the brigade's ammunition train was reorganized as the third 105 mm howitzer battalion, and the 155 mm howitzer battalion was formed from the 155 mm howitzer regiment. The engineer, medical, and quartermaster regiments were reorganized into battalions. In 1942, divisional quartermaster battalions were split into ordnance light maintenance companies and quartermaster companies, and the division's headquarters and military police company, which had previously been a combined unit, was split.

The 79th Infantry Division was ordered into active military service at Camp Pickett, Virginia on 15 June 1942, around a cadre of officers and enlisted men from officer candidate schools and the 4th Infantry Division, with the general staff selected by the War Department and Army Ground Forces. The initial enlisted fillers for the division arrived over a period of about two weeks after activation, and were principally Selective Service men from reception centers in the Third, Fourth, Fifth, Sixth, and Seventh Corps Areas, comprising the Mid-Atlantic, Southern, Great Lakes, and Midwestern states (the District of Columbia, Maryland, Pennsylvania, Virginia, Alabama, Florida, Georgia, Louisiana, Mississippi, North and South Carolina, Indiana, Kentucky, Ohio, West Virginia, Illinois, Michigan, Wisconsin, Arkansas, Iowa, Kansas, Minnesota, Missouri, Nebraska, North and South Dakota, and Wyoming)

After basic training, it participated in exercises in the Tennessee Maneuver Area, after which it moved to Camp Laguna near Yuma, Arizona, where it trained in the desert. It was then ordered to Camp Phillips, Kansas for training in winter conditions. At the beginning of April 1944, the division reported to the port of embarkation at Camp Myles Standish, Massachusetts.

==== Division organization ====
The division consisted of the following units:

79th Infantry Division organization (click to enlarge)

- 79th Infantry Division
  - 79th Infantry Division Headquarters
  - 79th Cavalry Reconnaissance Troop (Mechanized) (M3 scout cars and then M8 Greyhound armored cars)
  - 313th Infantry Regiment
    - Headquarters and Headquarters Company
    - 3× Infantry battalions
      - each battalion consists of: 1× Headquarters and Headquarters Company, 3× Rifle companies, 1× Heavy Weapons Company
    - Cannon Company (T12 Gun Motor Carriages and T19 Howitzer Motor Carriages, later replaced by either M3 105mm towed howitzers or M7 Priest self propelled howitzers)
    - Anti-Tank Company (M3 37mm anti-tank guns, which were replaced by 1944 with M1 57mm anti-tank guns)
    - Service Company
  - 314th Infantry Regiment
    - same organization as 313th Infantry Regiment
  - 315th Infantry Regiment
    - same organization as 313th Infantry Regiment
  - 79th Infantry Division Artillery
    - Headquarters and Headquarters Battery
    - 310th Field Artillery Battalion
      - Headquarters and Headquarters Battery
      - 3× Batteries (M2 105mm towed howitzers)
      - Service Battery
    - 311th Field Artillery Battalion
      - same organization as 310th Field Artillery Battalion
    - 312th Field Artillery Battalion
      - Headquarters and Headquarters Battery
      - 3× Batteries (M1 155mm towed howitzers)
      - Service Battery
    - 904th Field Artillery Battalion
      - same organization as 310th Field Artillery Battalion
  - Headquarters Special Troops
    - Headquarters Company, 79th Infantry Division
    - 79th Signal Company
    - 79th Quartermaster Company
    - 779th Ordnance Light Maintenance Company
    - Military Police Platoon
    - 79th Infantry Division Band (attached)
  - 304th Engineer Combat Battalion
    - Headquarters and Headquarters and Service Company
    - 3× Engineer combat companies
  - 304th Medical Battalion
    - Headquarters and Headquarters Detachment
    - 3× Collecting companies
    - Clearing Company

==== Combat chronicle ====
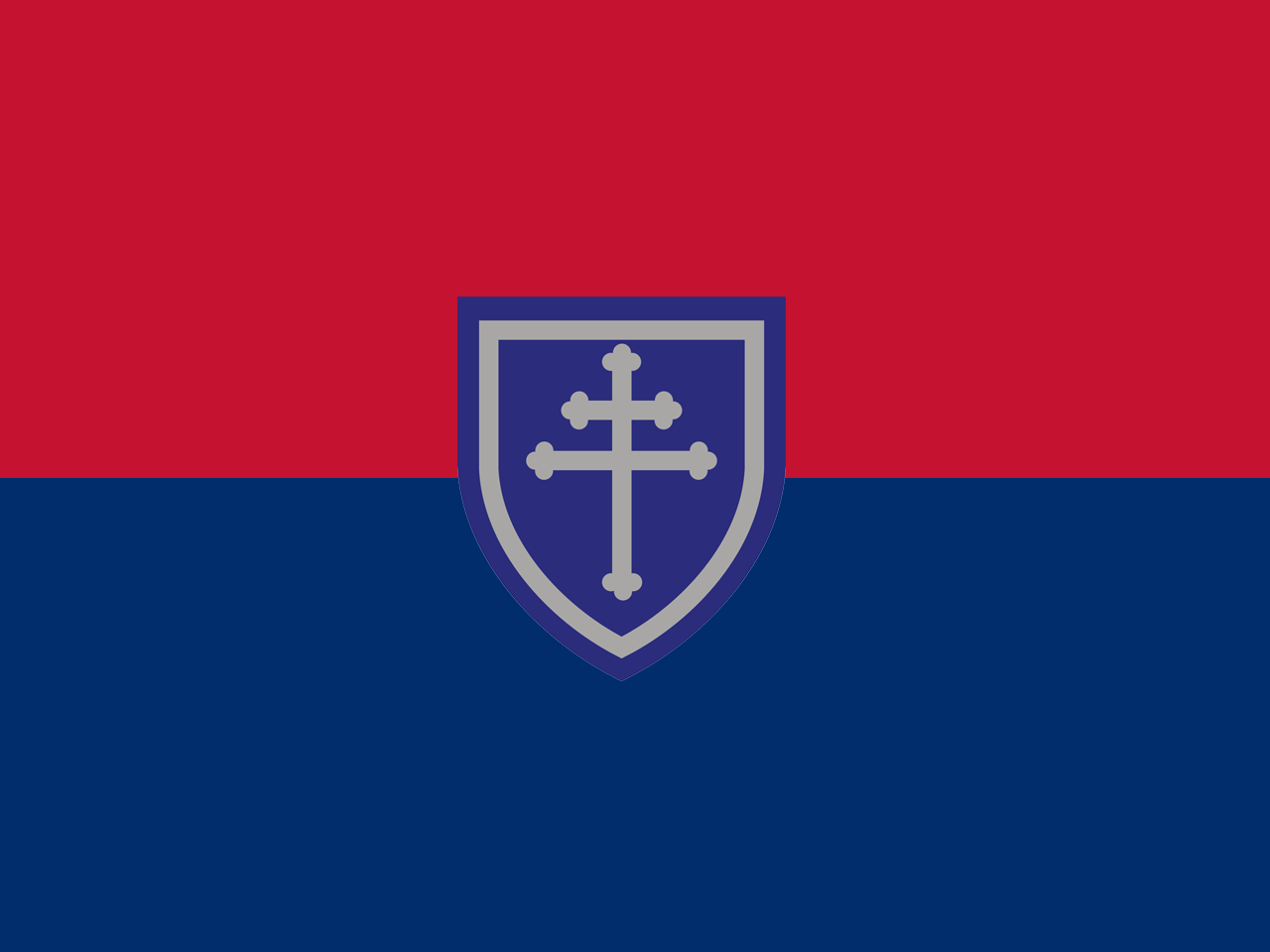
Flag of the United States Army 79th Infantry Division

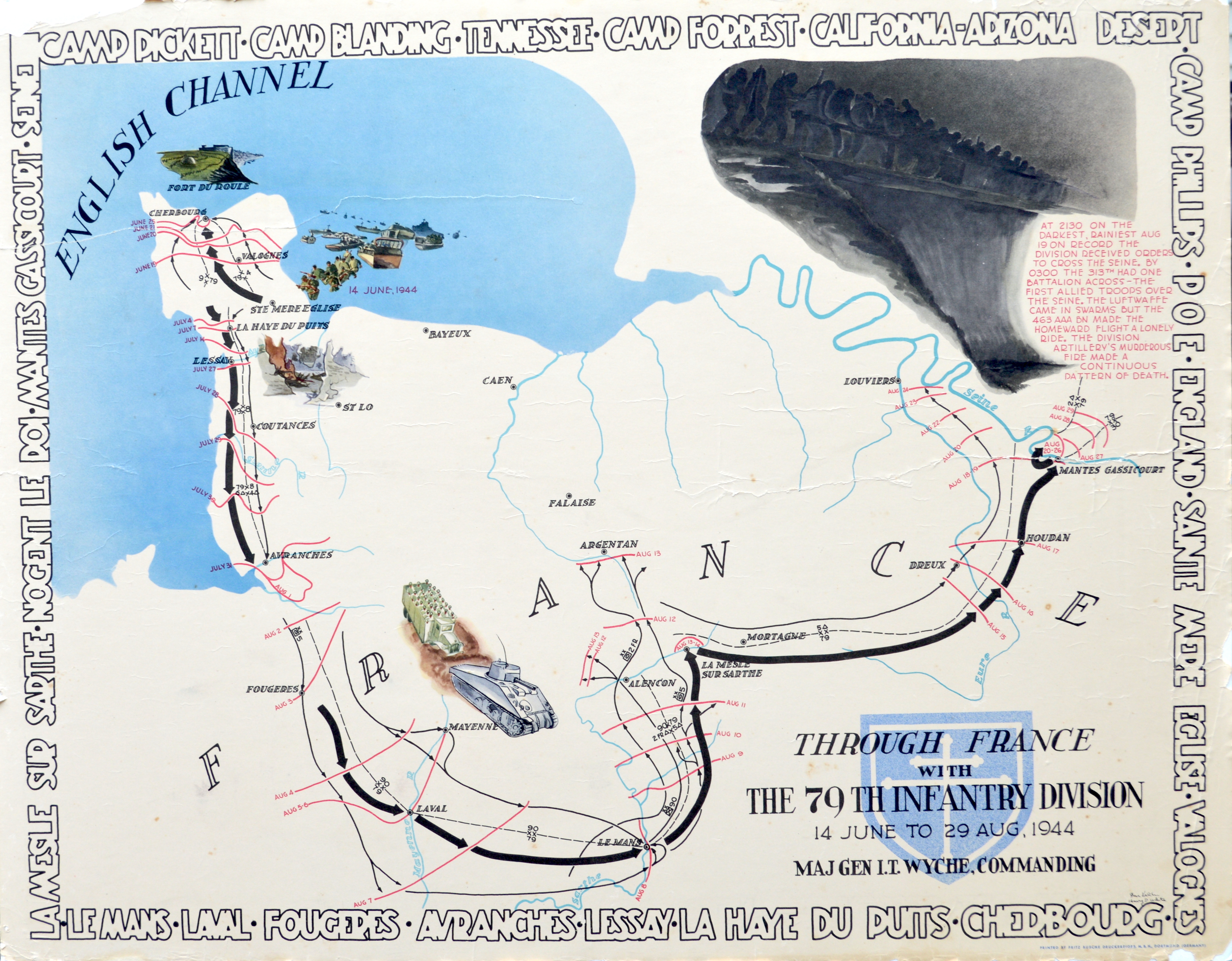
"Through France; 14 Jun - 29 Aug 1944" poster 1 of 4 of battle movements of the 79th Infantry Division.

The division arrived in Liverpool on 17 April and began training in amphibious operations. After training in the United Kingdom from 17 April 1944, the 79th Infantry Division landed on Utah Beach, Normandy, 12–14 June and entered combat 19 June 1944, with an attack on the high ground west and northwest of Valognes and high ground south of Cherbourg Naval Base. The division took Fort du Roule after a heavy engagement and entered Cherbourg, 25 June. It was around this time that Corporal John D. Kelly and First Lieutenant Carlos C. Ogden, both of the 314th Infantry Regiment, were awarded the Medal of Honor. It held a defensive line at the Ollonde River until 2 July 1944 and then returned to the offensive, taking La Haye du Puits in house-to-house fighting, 8 July. On 26 July, the 79th attacked across the Ay River, took Lessay, crossed the Sarthe River and entered Le Mans, 8 August, meeting only light resistance. The advance continued across the Seine, 19 August. Heavy German counterattacks were repelled, 22–27 August, and the division reached the Therain River, 31 August. Moving swiftly to the Franco-Belgian frontier near St. Amand (east of Lille), the division was then moved to XV Corps in eastern France, where it encountered heavy resistance in taking Charmes in street fighting, 12 September. The 79th cut across the Moselle and Meurthe Rivers, 13–23 September, cleared the Forêt de Parroy in a severe engagement, 28 September – 9 October, and attacked to gain high ground east of Emberménil, 14–23 October, when it was relieved, 24 October.

After rest and training at Lunéville, the division returned to combat with an attack from the MignevineMontiguy area, 13 November 1944, which carried it across the Vezouse and Moder Rivers, 18 November – 10 December, through Haguenau in spite of determined enemy resistance, and into the Siegfried Line, 17–20 December. The division held a defensive line along the Lauter River, at Wissembourg from 20 December 1944 until 2 January 1945, when it withdrew to Maginot Line defenses. The German attempt to establish a bridgehead west of the Rhine at Gambsheim resulted in furious fighting. The 79th beat off German attacks at Hatten and Rittershoffen in an 11-day battle before withdrawing to new defensive positions south of Haguenau on the Moder River, 19 January 1945. The division remained on the defensive along the Moder until 6 February 1945. During February and March 1945, the division mopped up German resistance, returned to offensive combat, 24 March 1945, crossed the Rhine, drove across the Rhine-Herne Canal, 7 April, secured the north bank of the Ruhr and took part in clearing the Ruhr Pocket until 13 April. The division then went on occupation duty, in the Dortmund, Sudetenland, and Bavarian areas successively, until its return to the United States and inactivation.

==== Casualties ====
- Total battle casualties: 15,203
- Killed in action: 2,476
- Wounded in action: 10,971
- Missing in action: 579
- Prisoner of war: 1,186

==== Assignments in ETO ====
- 18 April 1944: VIII Corps, Third Army.
- 29 May 1944: Third Army but attached to VII Corps, First Army.
- 30 June 1944: Third Army, but attached to First Army.
- 1 July 1944: VIII Corps.
- 1 August 1944: VIII Corps, Third Army, 12th Army Group.
- 8 August 1944: XV Corps.
- 24 August 1944: XV Corps, Third Army, 12th Army Group, but attached to First Army.
- 26 August 1944: XV Corps, First Army, 12th Army Group.
- 29 August 1944: XII Corps.
- 7 September 1944: XV Corps, Third Army, 12th Army Group.
- 29 September 1944: Third Army, 12th Army Group, but attached to the XV Corps, Seventh Army, 6th Army Group.
- 25 November 1944: XV Corps, Seventh Army, 6th Army Group.
- 5 December 1944: VI Corps.
- 6 February 1945: Seventh Army, 6th Army Group.
- 17 February 1945: Seventh Army, 6th Army Group, but attached to the XVI Corps, Ninth Army, 12th Army Group.
- 1 March 1945: XIII Corps.
- 7 March 1945: XVI Corps.
- 7 April 1945: XVI Corps, Ninth Army, 12th Army Group.

== Honors ==
=== Campaign participation credits ===
- World War I:
1. Meuse-Argonne;
2. Lorraine 1918;
- World War II:
1. Normandy;
2. Northern France;
3. Rhineland;
4. Ardennes-Alsace;
5. Central Europe

=== Decorations ===
1. French Croix de Guerre with Palm, World War II, streamer embroidered NORMANDY TO PARIS
2. French Croix de Guerre with Palm, World War II, streamer embroidered PARROY FORREST
3. French Croix de Guerre, World War II, Fourragere

== Army Reserve division ==
- Inactivated 11 December 1945 at Camp Kilmer, New Jersey
- Activated 14 November 1946 at Philadelphia, Pennsylvania
- (Organized Reserves redesignated 25 March 1948 as the Organized Reserve Corps; redesignated 9 July 1952 as the Army Reserve)
- Reorganized and redesignated 1 April 1959 as Headquarters and Headquarters Company, 79th Infantry Division
- Consolidated 28 February 1963 with Headquarters and Headquarters Company, 79th Infantry Division (activated 7 January 1963 at Philadelphia, Pennsylvania), and consolidated unit designated as Headquarters and Headquarters Company, 79th Operational Headquarters
- Redesignated 1 June 1963 as Headquarters and Headquarters Company, 79th Command Headquarters
- Inactivated 30 December 1965 at Philadelphia, Pennsylvania
- Redesignated 23 June 1982 as Headquarters and Headquarters Company, 79th Infantry Division

== 79th Sustainment Support Command ==
- Redesignated 1 December 2009 as Headquarters and Headquarters Company, 79th United States Army Reserve Sustainment Support Command; Headquarters concurrently activated at Los Alamitos, California
- Reorganized and redesignated 16 September 2017 as Headquarters and Special Troops Battalion, 79th Sustainment Command

The 79th Sustainment Support Command (SSC) headquarters is at Joint Forces Training Base (JFTB) Los Alamitos, California. The 79th SSC was redesignated and concurrently activated on 1 December 2009. It now is tasked to provide trained, ready, cohesive, well-led sustainment units for worldwide deployment.

The 79th SSC commands over 20,000 U.S. Army Reserve sustainment soldiers organized into over 200 units dispersed throughout the western half of the United States. Major subordinate commands of the 79th SSC include the 4th Sustainment Command (Expeditionary) in San Antonio, Texas, the 311th Sustainment Command (Expeditionary) in Los Angeles, California, the 364th Sustainment Command (Expeditionary) in Marysville, Washington, and the 451st Expeditionary Sustainment Command in Wichita, Kansas. As the operational command posts of a theater sustainment command – the ESCs plan, coordinate synchronize, monitor, and control operational- level sustainment operations for Army service component commands, joint task forces and joint forces commands throughout the world.

The command became a Theater Sustainment Command (TSC) on September 16, 2017.

- Commanders
  - Major General William D. Frink, Jr. (1 December 2009 – 8 February 2013)
  - Major General Megan P. Tatu (9 February 2013 – 4 December 2015)
  - Major General Mark Palzer (5 December 2015 – 8 December 2018)
  - Major General Eugene J. Leboeuf (8 December 2018 – Present)

== Organization ==
The 79th Theater Sustainment Command is a subordinate functional command of the United States Army Reserve Command. As of January 2026, the command consists of the following units:

- 79th Theater Sustainment Command, at Joint Forces Training Base – Los Alamitos (CA)
  - Headquarters and Headquarters Company, at Joint Forces Training Base – Los Alamitos (CA)
  - 3rd Theater Personnel Operations Center, in Jackson (MS)
  - 103rd Expeditionary Sustainment Command, in Des Moines (IA)
    - 321st Sustainment Brigade, in Baton Rouge (LA)
      - 321st Special Troops Battalion, in Baton Rouge (LA)
      - 365th Combat Sustainment Support Battalion, in Jackson (MS)
      - 375th Combat Sustainment Support Battalion, in Mobile (AL)
    - 644th Regional Support Group, at Fort Snelling (MN)
      - 457th Transportation Battalion (Motor), at Fort Snelling (MN)
    - 645th Regional Support Group, in Southfield (MI)
      - 406th Combat Sustainment Support Battalion, in Ann Arbor (MI)
    - 646th Regional Support Group, in Madison (WI)
      - 687th Combat Sustainment Support Battalion, in Wausau (WI)
    - 649th Regional Support Group, in Cedar Rapids (IA)
      - 419th Transportation Battalion (Movement Control), in Bartonville (IL)
      - 470th Transportation Battalion (Movement Control), in Elwood (IL)
  - 311th Expeditionary Sustainment Command, in Los Angeles (CA)
    - 304th Sustainment Brigade, at March Air Reserve Base (CA)
      - 304th Special Troops Battalion, at March Air Reserve Base (CA)
      - 155th Combat Sustainment Support Battalion, in South El Monte (CA)
      - 371st Combat Sustainment Support Battalion, at March Air Reserve Base (CA)
      - 420th Transportation Battalion (Movement Control), in Sherman Oaks (CA)
    - 650th Regional Support Group, in Sloan (NV)
      - 314th Combat Sustainment Support Battalion, in Sloan (NV)
      - 469th Combat Sustainment Support Battalion, in Mountain View (CA)
    - 653rd Regional Support Group, in Mesa (AZ)
      - 336th Combat Sustainment Support Battalion, in Buckeye (AZ)
      - 418th Quartermaster Battalion (Petroleum Support), in Red Rock (AZ)
      - 419th Combat Sustainment Support Battalion, in Tustin (CA)
  - 364th Expeditionary Sustainment Command, in Marysville (WA)
    - 96th Sustainment Brigade, at Fort Douglas (UT)
      - 96th Special Troops Battalion, at Fort Douglas (UT)
      - 191st Combat Sustainment Support Battalion, at Fort Douglas (UT)
    - 319th Transportation Brigade, at Camp Parks (CA)
      - 385th Transportation Battalion (Terminal), in Tacoma (WA)
      - 483rd Transportation Battalion (Terminal), in Vallejo (CA)
    - 652nd Regional Support Group, at Fort Harrison (MT)
      - 814th Transportation Battalion (Motor), in Boise (ID)
    - 654th Regional Support Group, in Tacoma (WA)
      - 382nd Combat Sustainment Support Battalion, at Joint Base Lewis–McChord (WA)
  - 451st Expeditionary Sustainment Command, in Wichita (KS)
    - 89th Sustainment Brigade, in Kansas City (MO)
      - 89th Special Troops Battalion, in Kansas City (MO)
      - 329th Combat Sustainment Support Battalion, in Parsons (KS)
      - 484th Transportation Battalion (Movement Control), in Springfield (MO)
      - 620th Combat Sustainment Support Battalion, in St. Louis (MO)
    - 561st Regional Support Group, in Elkhorn (NE)
      - 394th Combat Sustainment Support Battalion, in Fremont (NE)
      - 450th Transportation Battalion (Movement Control), in Manhattan (KS)
      - 821st Transportation Battalion (Motor), in Topeka (KS)

== General ==
- Nickname: Cross of Lorraine Division.
- Shoulder patch: White bordered blue shield on which is superimposed a cross of Lorraine.

== In popular culture ==
- The HBO period drama Perry Mason depicts the titular character as a Captain who served in the 79th Infantry during World War I before receiving a blue discharge. The second episode depicts a flashback with Mason participating in the Meuse–Argonne offensive of 1918.

== See also ==
- Rhino tank
- Royal C. Johnson, who served with the division during World War I
- Thomas W. Miller, who also served with the 79th Division in World War I
- Val A. Browning

== Sources ==
- Clay, Steven E. (2010). US Army Order of Battle 1919–1941, Vol. 1: The Arms: Major Commands and Infantry Organizations (PDF). Fort Leavenworth, Kansas: Combat Studies Institute Press. Archived from the original (PDF) on 27 March 2018.
