= 319th Brigade =

319th Brigade may refer to:

- 319th Military Intelligence Brigade, United States
- 319th Transportation Brigade, United States

== See also ==
- 319th Regiment (disambiguation)
