= 2026 Port Shuaiba drone attack =

2026 Iranian drone strike in Kuwait

Coordinates: 29°02′29.5″N 48°08′06.6″E

- Part of 2026 Iranian strikes on Kuwait during the Iran war
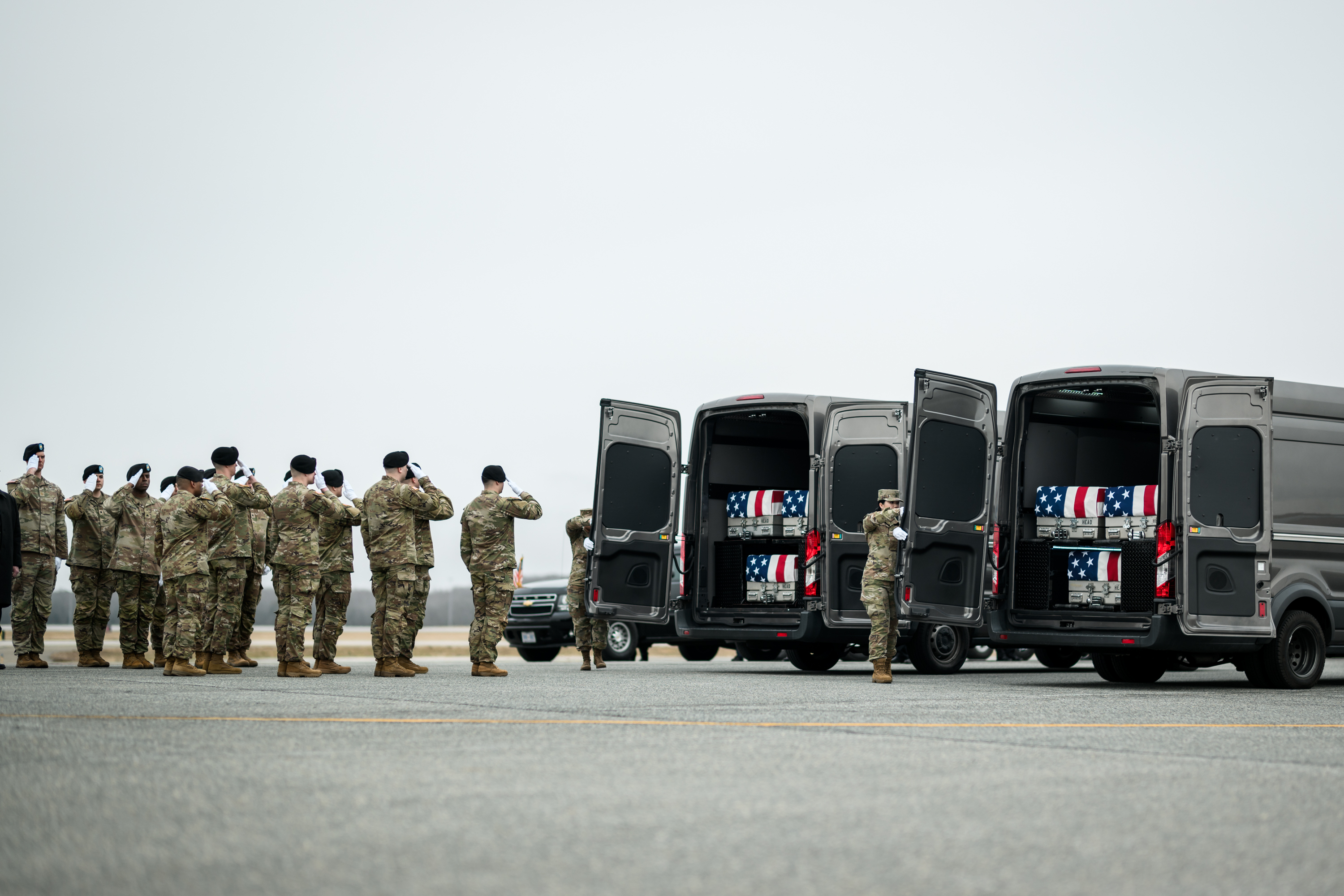
- Coffins of the American soldiers killed in the strike at Dover Air Force Base
- Type: One-way drone strike
- Location: Port Shuaiba, Kuwait
- Planned by: Iran; ICC
- Target: United States Armed Forces; Tactical operations center near Camp Arifjan
- Date: March 1, 2026; 7 months ago c. 9:00 a.m. (UTC+3)
- Executed by: Iran; Islamic Revolutionary Guard Corps Aerospace Force
- Outcome: Iranian victory: Drone evades air defense systems and directly hits the operations center
- Casualties: (United States) 6 killed (United States) 30+ injured
- Location of the tactical operations center in Kuwait

On 1 March 2026, an Iranian one-way attack drone struck a tactical operations center belonging to the United States Armed Forces in Port Shuaiba, an industrial port in Kuwait. The operations center was described as a makeshift and relatively unprotected site which logistical units were moved to from the larger Camp Arifjan in preparation for the Iran war, which began the day prior. Air defense systems failed to intercept the drone and warning sirens were not activated before it directly struck the main office trailer.

The attack killed six United States Army Reserve soldiers, the first casualties suffered by the US in the war. More than 30 soldiers were additionally injured according to CBS News. An internal memo obtained by the agency reported that Iranian intelligence may have tracked the movement of US personnel at the site prior to the start of the war.

== Background ==
Port Shuaiba is a civilian port in Kuwait positioned along the Persian Gulf and south of Kuwait City. It has been described as a "critical logistics hub" for the United States Armed Forces presence in the Middle East. The US military installation in Port Shuaiba targeted in the attack was located between oil storage tanks, refineries and a power plant, and was around one mile away from civilian cargo piers at the port. Built years ago, it was repurposed during the prelude to the 2026 Iran war to serve as a backup tactical operations center. Its occupants were part of different home units assigned to the 1st Theater Sustainment Command, involved in logistics support for US forces across the region. They were relocated from Camp Arifjan, the primary US base in the area 10 miles south of the operations center, as part of a dispersal strategy to minimize chances of American casualties from retaliatory Iranian operations.

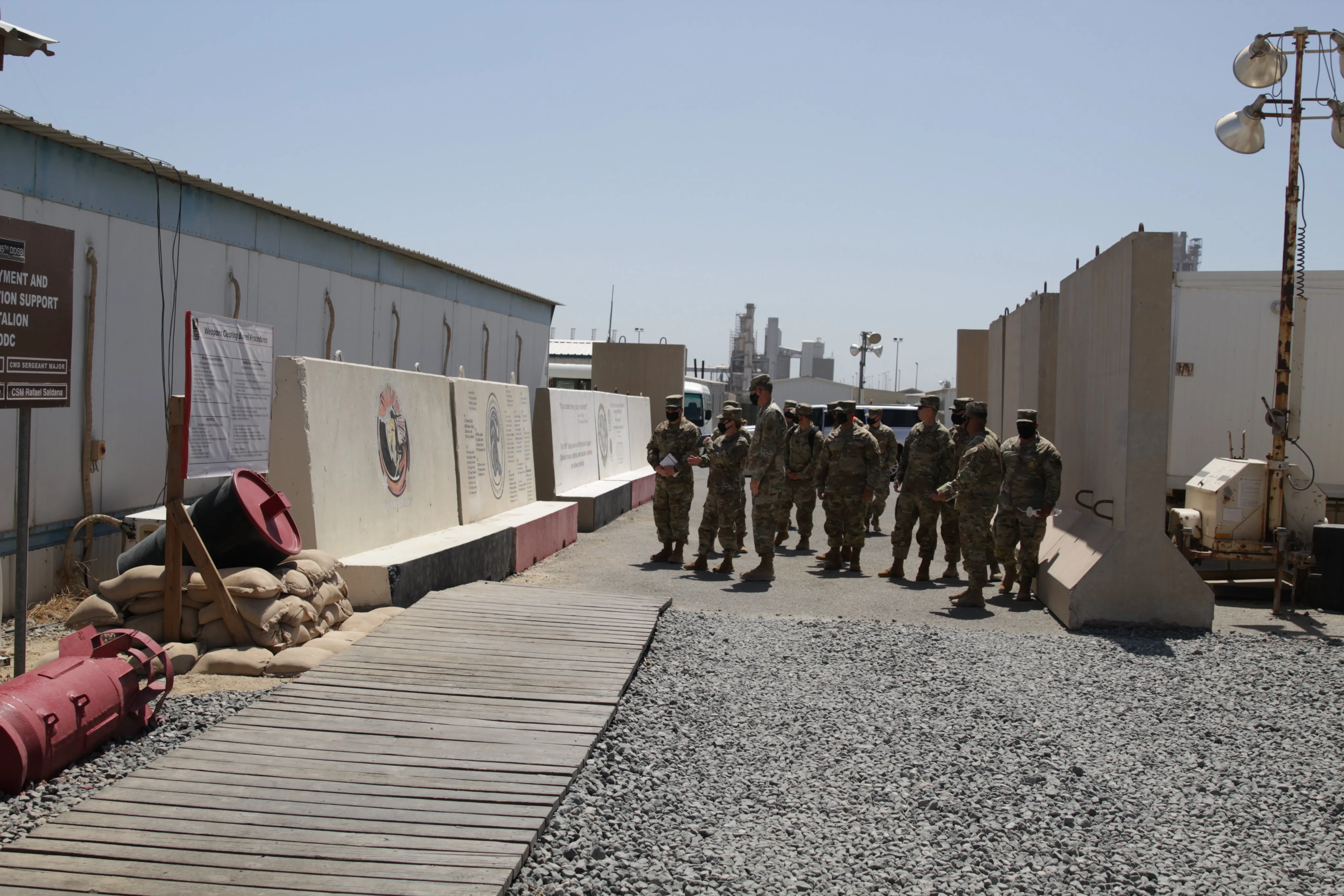
Military installation in Port Shuaiba similar to the one targeted in the attack

The husband of a soldier killed in the attack described the targeted structure at the operations center as a "shipping container-style building". It was a triple-wide trailer with an office interior surrounded by reinforced concrete T-Walls, a standard US military setup. According to The Washington Post, a photo from 2021 shows the trailer had a "thin metal rooftop", and no significant upgrades to its protection since at least 2009. Military officials told the outlet that there were no additional reinforcements to the structure. The military presence in Port Shuaiba did not possess counter rocket, artillery and mortar systems and "basically had no drone defeat capability" despite requests for further support according to internal sources speaking to CBS News. Because of these factors, the military was uncertain as to whether the operations center should be used or not.

== Attack ==
I remember turning my head to the left and I'd seen the nose of that drone pop through, and as soon as it did I knew what it was, it was either a missile or a drone, So I turned to my right, and that's when it blew up and just blew the whole building apart.

— Sergeant First Class Cory Hicks, 103rd Expeditionary Sustainment Command

At around 9:00 a.m. local time on 1 March, amidst a wave of Iranian attacks in the region a day after the start of the war, the tactical operations center at Port Shuaiba was struck by a single one-way attack drone while dozens of US soldiers were present. The drone flew at a slow pace and low altitude, managing to evade US air defense systems and directly hitting the top of the trailer at the site. It destroyed the structure, leaving "the inside of the makeshift operations center blackened and the walls blown outwards from the blast, some parts peeling away from the building." Fire and smoke engulfed it thereafter, plumes still emanating from it at least 11:00 a.m. Media reports described a chaotic scene as smoke in the building hindered the rescue process. By 4:00 p.m. ET on 2 March, the military had accounted for all soldiers killed in the attack.

Sergeant First Class Cory Hicks of the 103rd Expeditionary Sustainment Command recalled site personnel being stationed in a bunker as projectiles were being intercepted overhead before the situation was declared all clear and they returned to their posts, whereupon the drone hit them. There was no prior warning to the attack as counter-battery devices did not detect a threat and activate a warning siren. Personnel at the installation recall the warning system working correctly in tests a week prior to the attack, although in some cases the siren only sounded once the drone had already breached the area.

== Casualties ==
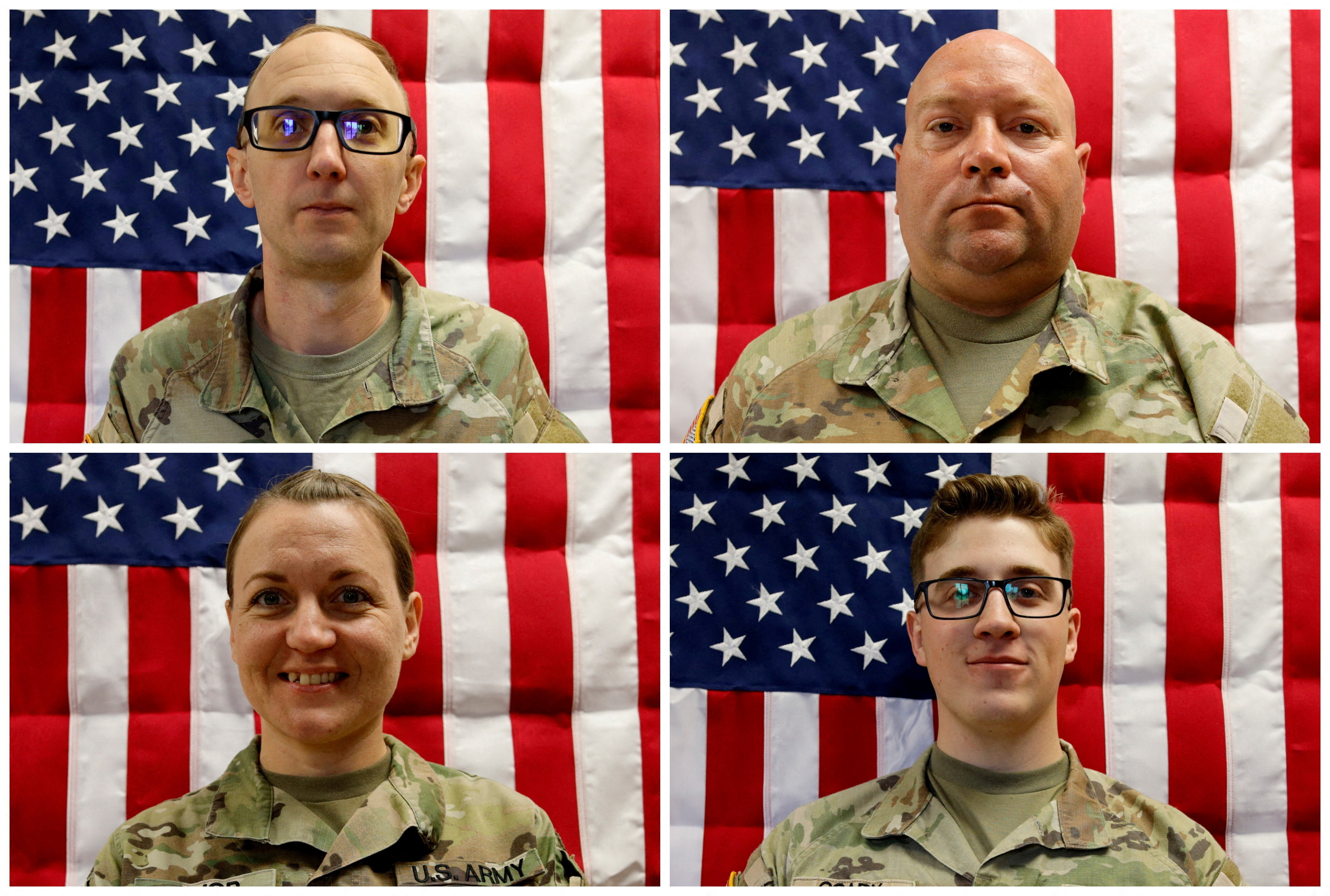
First four of the six US soldiers killed in the war: Capt. Cody Khork, Sgt. 1st Class Noah Tietjens, Sgt. 1st Class Nicole Amor, and Sgt. Declan Coady

Six soldiers from the Army Reserve were killed in the attack. They constituted the first Americans soldiers killed during the Iran war. All of them were assigned to the 103rd Expeditionary Sustainment Command based in Des Moines, Iowa, and were serving abroad with the 1st Theater Sustainment Command. They were identified as:

- Captain Cody A. Khork (35 years old) of Winter Haven, Florida
- Sergeant First Class Noah L. Tietjens (42 years old) of Bellevue, Nebraska
- Sergeant First Class Nicole M. Amor (39 years old) of White Bear Lake, Minnesota
- Sergeant Declan J. Coady (20 years old) of West Des Moines, lowa. Coady was posthumously promoted from the rank of specialist.
- Major Jeffrey O'Brien (45 years old) of Indianola, Iowa
- Chief Warrant Officer 3 Robert Marzan (54 years old) of Sacramento, California

At first, the Department of Defense did not publicize the number of people wounded in the attack, but later said on 2 March that five were seriously wounded while others had "minor shrapnel injuries and concussions", two of whom were found underneath rubble after initially being declared missing. On 11 March, CBS News reported that more than 30 soldiers had suffered serious injuries in the attack, their treatment being split between Brooke Army Medical Center in San Antonio, Walter Reed Army Medical Center in Washington, D.C., and at Landstuhl Regional Medical Center in Germany. Around 20 were designated for urgent care at the latter, suffering from traumatic brain injuries, memory loss and concussions. Generally the victims had suffered effects including brain trauma, shrapnel wounds, and burns, while one may require amputation.

== Investigation ==
CENTCOM spokesperson Captain Tim Hawkins confirmed an investigation was being conducted into the incident. CBS News reported on 5 March that according to the preliminary conclusions of a US Army Central memo reviewed by the agency, Iranian intelligence and allied proxy groups had likely managed to track and monitor the transfer of US military personnel to smaller military installations a week prior to the attack. The memo reported the discovery of "GPS transponders connected to balloons or parachutes" near MIM-104 Patriot systems in the area on 2 March. Military officials speaking to CBS News had attested to spotting quadcopter reconnaissance flights across Port Shuaiba in the preceding week. Officials speaking to the Financial Times did not believe that Russian intelligence contributed to the attack.

== Aftermath ==
Speaking on the attack at a press conference, Secretary of Defense Pete Hegseth said the successful penetration of US air defense systems by the drone was an outlier, acknowledging them as "powerful weapons". He pledged to "prosecute the remainder of this operation in a manner that honors" the victims. Department of Defense spokesperson Sean Parnell discredited media descriptions of the operations center as 'makeshift', claiming it was adequately fortified through the presence of T-walls and praising US air defense, while maintaining that "Every possible measure has been taken to safeguard our troops — at every level."

A dignified transfer of the remains of those killed in the attack took place at Dover Air Force Base on 7 March. In attendance were the relatives of the victims as well as top officials including President Donald Trump, Vice President JD Vance and their spouses, along with numerous senior cabinet officials and politicians from Iowa, Minnesota, Nebraska and Florida. Upon being asked if he would attend more dignified transfers for soldiers killed in the conflict, President Trump replied: "I'm sure. I hate to... but it's a part of war."

== Analysis ==
According to Tom Karako, an analyst from the Center for Strategic and International Studies, the inability of US air defense systems to neutralize the drone was due to its low altitude, small size, and slow speed, issues which make an interception more challenging compared to other projectiles such as ballistic missiles. Ryan Morgan of The Santa Clarita Valley Signal said the attack "showcased the challenges that can arise in a large-scale conflict, when waves of attack drones are mixed into salvos of ballistic missiles to exhaust defensive networks."

Janes satellite imagery analyst Sean O'Connor said the defenses at the operations center were inadequate to protect against air attacks, regarded as the primary threat in the region. According to The Washington Post, the operations center did not follow procedures listed in counter-drone manual of the US Army, which stipulates increased overhead protection for vulnerable sites. Multiple sources note that the T-walls present at the operations center are meant to protect against ground assaults and not airborne threats.

== See also ==
- Attacks on the United States
- Tower 22 drone attack
