= 321st Sustainment Brigade =

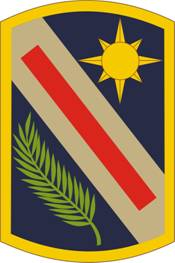
- 321st Sustainment Brigade shoulder sleeve insignia
- Active: March 2006–present
- Country: United States
- Branch: United States Army Reserve
- Type: Sustainment Brigade
- Size: Brigade
- Part of: 103rd Expeditionary Sustainment Command
- Garrison/HQ: Baton Rouge (LA)

Commanders
- Current commander: Col. Blaine Holmes

Insignia
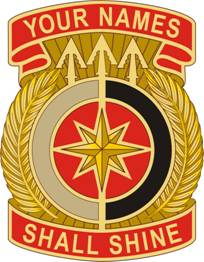
- 321st Sustainment Brigade DUI

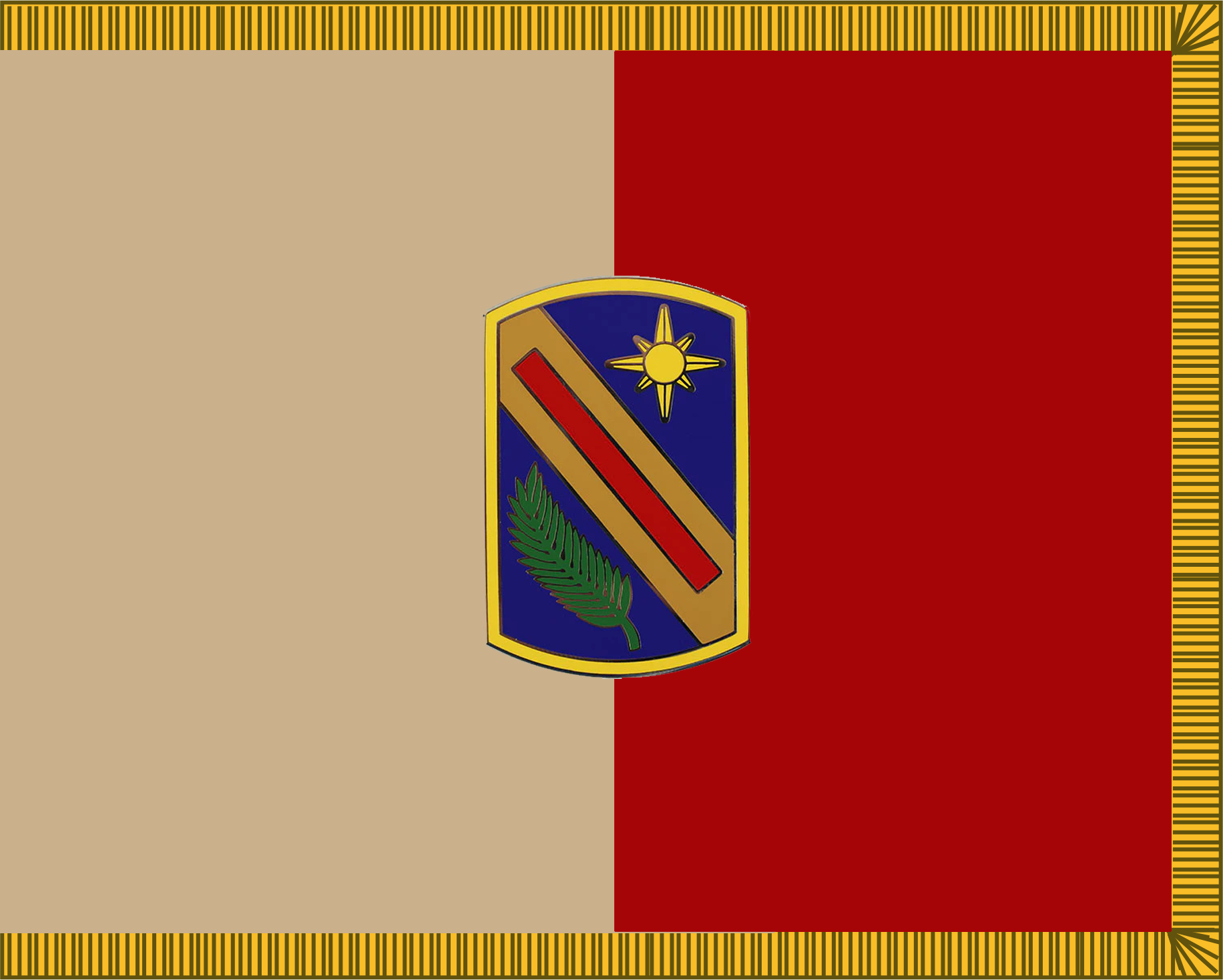
- 321st Sustainment Brigade Flag

The 321st Sustainment Brigade is a sustainment brigade of the United States Army Reserve.

== Organization ==
The 321st Sustainment Brigade is a subordinate unit of the 103rd Expeditionary Sustainment Command. As of January 2026 the brigade consists of the following units:

- 321st Sustainment Brigade, in Baton Rouge (LA)
  - 321st Special Troops Battalion, in Baton Rouge (LA)
    - Headquarters and Headquarters Company, 321st Sustainment Brigade, in Baton Rouge (LA)
    - 831st Brigade Signal Company (MEB/CAB/SB), in Baton Rouge (LA)
  - 365th Combat Sustainment Support Battalion, in Jackson (MS)
    - Headquarters and Headquarters Company, 365th Combat Sustainment Support Battalion, in Jackson (MS)
    - 173rd Quartermaster Company (Petroleum Pipeline and Terminal Operation), in Greenwood (MS)
    - 296th Transportation Medium Truck Company (POL, 5K GAL) (EAB Linehaul), in Brookhaven (MS)
      - Detachment 1, 296th Transportation Medium Truck Company (POL, 5K GAL) (EAB Linehaul), in Hattiesburg (MS)
    - 647th Transportation Medium Truck Company (Cargo) (EAB Linehaul), in Laurel (MS)
      - Detachment 1, 647th Transportation Medium Truck Company (Cargo) (EAB Linehaul), in Meridian (MS)
    - 658th Quartermaster Company (Supply), in Tupelo (MS)
      - 2nd Platoon, 658th Quartermaster Company (Supply), in Starkville (MS)
    - 850th Transportation Medium Truck Company (PLS) (EAB Tactical), in Lyon (MS)
    - 894th Quartermaster Company (Petroleum Support), in Jackson (MS)
  - 375th Combat Sustainment Support Battalion, in Mobile (AL)
    - Headquarters and Headquarters Company, 375th Combat Sustainment Support Battalion, in Mobile (AL)
    - 194th Human Resources Company, in Bossier City (LA)
    - 303rd Quartermaster Company (Water Purification and Distribution), in Lake Charles (LA)
    - 495th Transportation Company (Inland Cargo Transfer Company — ICTC), in Jonesboro (AR)
    - 498th Transportation Medium Truck Company (PLS) (EAB Tactical), in Mobile (AL)
    - 342nd Transportation Detachment (Movement Control Team), in Baton Rouge (LA)
    - 540th Transportation Detachment (Movement Control Team), in Baton Rouge (LA)
    - 616th Quartermaster Company (Petroleum Support), in Lafayette (LA)

Abbreviations: PLS — Palletized Load System; POL — Petroleum Oil Lubricants; EAB — Echelon Above Brigade

== History ==
The 321st Materiel Management Center (MMC) (Theater Support) was activated as the Headquarters and Headquarters Company, 321st Logistical Command Fort Wayne, Indiana, on 27 February 1951, and inactivated on 31 December 1955. In October 1981, the unit was reactivated as the 321st Materiel Management Center (Provisional). The unit was assembled from Detachment 1, 4013th U.S. Army Garrison in Baton Rouge, Louisiana., and 458th Stock Control Company in El Dorado, Arkansas. The 321st MMC became a permanent unit in the Army Reserve on 16 April 1982, under the command of the 377th Theater Army Area Command (TAACOM) in New Orleans, Louisiana. On 20 September 1990, the 321st MMC was mobilized at Fort Polk, Louisiana, during Operation Desert Shield, and arrived in Dhahran, Saudi Arabia on 9 October 1990. Initially, the MMC was assigned the task of logistical management for Third Army (ARCENT). As the theater matured, the MMC managed the prodigious logistics effort necessitated by the flow of massive forces, which enabled the Army to decisively defeat the enemy in 100 hours. The 321st MMC's outstanding accomplishments resulted in the unit being awarded the Meritorious Unit Commendation. Operation Desert Calm saw the MMC involved in facilitating the deployment of all U.S. Army units back to Europe and the United States. The unit also supported Operation Provide Comfort aimed at helping the isolated Kurdish resistance in Iraq. The 321st MMC received three campaign credits in Southwest Asia during these operations. They are "The Defense of Saudi Arabia", "The Liberation and Defense of Kuwait" and the "Cease Fire".

The 321st MMC continued its logistical support to the Southwest Asia Theater and deployed Land forces under 3rd Army. A permanent Forward Detachment of the 321st MMC was domiciled at Camp Doha, Kuwait from 1992 to 2005. In October 2000, the 321st MMC was officially reorganized as a Theater Support Command MMC and multi-component unit of the U.S. Army. On 12 October 2001 detachments of the 321st TMMC were mobilized in support of Operation Enduring Freedom in response to the tragic 11 September 2001 attacks on the United States. These elements provided the necessary additional capability to the 321st for support of the Coalition Force Land Component Command (CFLCC) operations in Afghanistan and the Horn of Africa. Additional personnel were deployed to Baton Rouge, La., and Camp Doha, Kuwait during these operations. In August, September and October 2002 additional personnel were mobilized to continue and expand support for Operation Enduring Freedom, as the 321st TMMC operated as the single Corps Theater Automation Support Center (CTASC) in the CENTCOM AOR. On 2 January 2003 the remainder of the 321st TMMC was mobilized to Fort Polk, Louisiana. By 27 January 2003 the 321st had deployed 200 personnel to Kuwait to support Operation Iraqi Freedom. The 321st TMMC was given the mission as the Theater Support Command MMC and the Theater Army MMC during the buildup and execution of Operation Iraqi Freedom. This operation saw the Army provide support over the longest land lines of communication in Army History. The operation was successful resulting in the overthrow of the Iraqi government. The 321st TMMC began a phased demobilization on 15 July 2003 still maintaining a continual mission presence at Baton Rouge, Camp Doha and Camp Arifjan, Kuwait. On 26 January 2004, Third Army designated the 321st CTASC as the single CTASC for the entire Southwest Asia Theater, processing more transactions in one day that any other CTASC processes in a month. This CTASC mission expansion, as well as the expansion of operations in Arifjan in April 2004 in response to the current insurgency in Iraq, caused the MMC to once again mobilize additional soldiers comparable to its full scale mobilization in 2003. Today the MMC simultaneously administers to both a fully staffed Reserve Component organization and a split-based mission-support organization staffed predominantly through large numbers of dedicated soldiers cross-leveled from throughout the Army Reserve. In October 2003 the 321st began a unique affiliation with the 304th CMMC from Los Angeles, California, to provide a large number of soldiers still serving today. The 321st TMMC permanent mission continues to change with the evolution of today's Army. The unit is transforming its Reserve Component element from that of a Materiel Management Center to that of a Sustainment Brigade Headquarters. It is the only unit in today's Army endeavoring to accomplish that transformation while simultaneously performing a wartime mission.
