= 364th Expeditionary Sustainment Command =

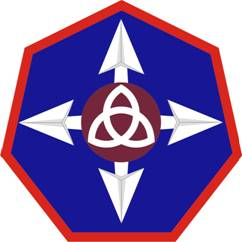
- Active: 20 January 1971 - present
- Country: United States
- Branch: United States Army Reserve
- Role: Sustainment Command
- Size: Brigade
- Part of: 79th Theater Sustainment Command
- Garrison/HQ: Marysville, Washington
- Motto: We Live To Support
- Website: https://www.usar.army.mil/79thTSC/364thESC/

Commanders
- Current commander: BG Vivek Kshetrapal
- Command Sergeant Major: CSM David R. Sayers

Insignia
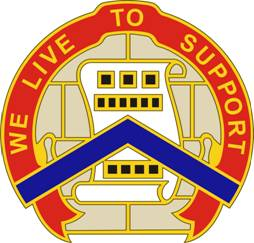
- 364th Sustainment Command DUI

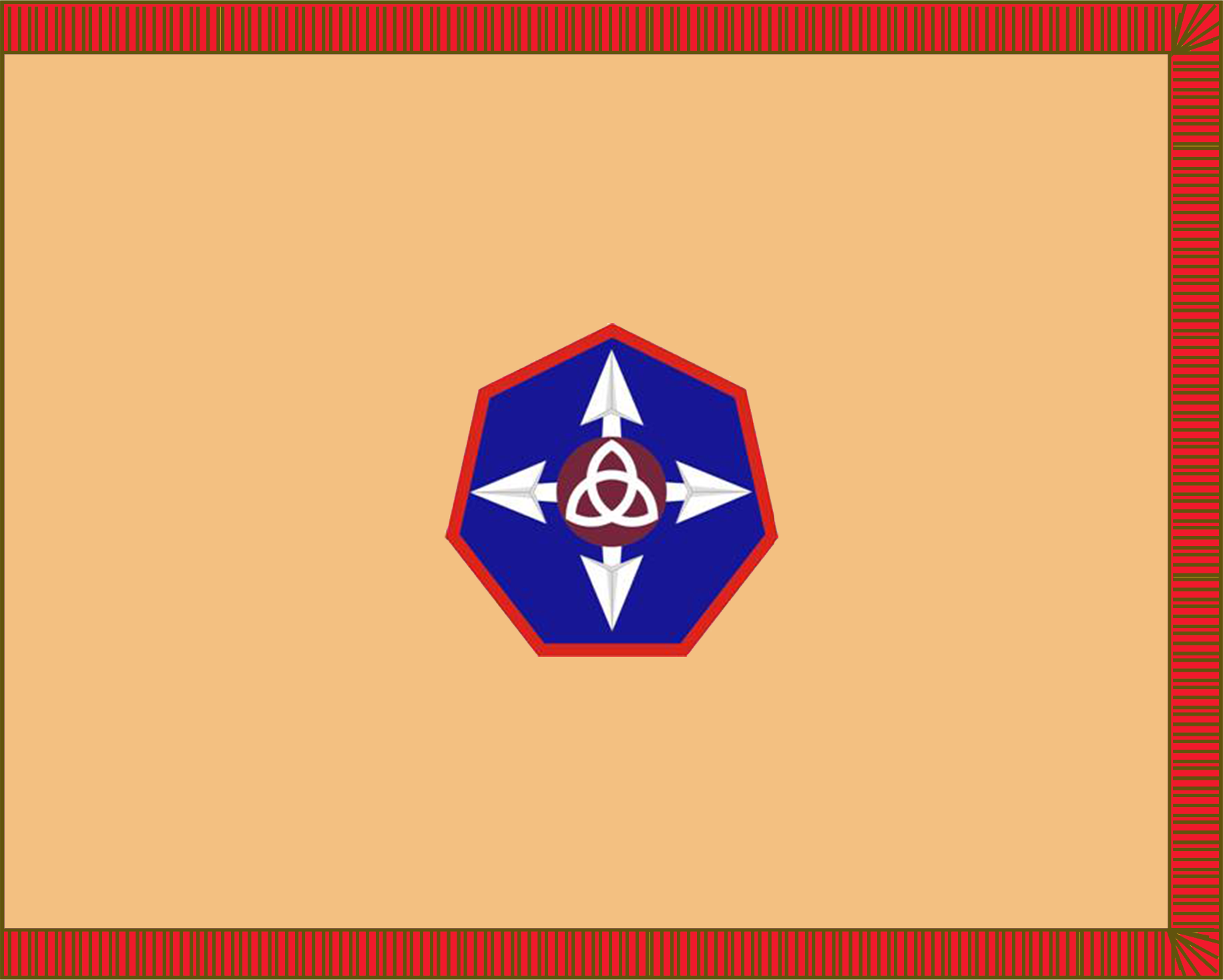
- 364th Sustainment Command Flag

The 364th Expeditionary Sustainment Command (364 ESC) is a Sustainment Command of the United States Army Reserve based at Marysville, Washington. The unit was originally formed in 1965 as the 364th General Support group in New York City. In 1968, the unit was redesignated the 364th Support Group at Fort Totten, N.Y. until it was deactivated in 1994. In 2007, the unit was reactivated as the 364th Sustainment Command (Expeditionary) in Marysville, Wash. The 364 ESC was deployed to Kuwait in 2011.

== Organization ==
The 364th Expeditionary Sustainment Command is a subordinate unit of the 79th Theater Sustainment Command. As of January 2026 the command consists of the following units:

- 364th Expeditionary Sustainment Command, in Marysville (WA)
  - Headquarters and Headquarters Company, 364th Expeditionary Sustainment Command, in Marysville (WA)
  - 96th Sustainment Brigade, at Fort Douglas (UT)
    - 96th Special Troops Battalion, at Fort Douglas (UT)
      - Headquarters and Headquarters Company, 96th Sustainment Brigade, at Fort Douglas (UT)
      - 850th Brigade Signal Company (MEB/CAB/SB), at Fort Douglas (UT)
    - 191st Combat Sustainment Support Battalion, at Fort Douglas (UT)
      - Headquarters and Headquarters Company, 191st Combat Sustainment Support Battalion, at Fort Douglas (UT)
      - 146th Transportation Medium Truck Company (POL, 5K GAL) (EAB Linehaul), in Ogden (UT)
      - 419th Transportation Medium Truck Company (POL, 5K GAL) (EAB Linehaul), in Salt Lake City (UT)
      - 478th Human Resources Company, at Fort Douglas (UT)
      - 786th Quartermaster Company (Petroleum Support), in Provo (UT)
      - 872nd Ordnance Company (Support Maintenance), in Ogden (UT)
      - 889th Transportation Detachment (Movement Control Team), in Salt Lake City (UT)
      - 890th Transportation Company (Inland Cargo Transfer Company — ICTC), in Logan (UT)
    - 395th Financial Management Support Unit, at Fort Douglas (UT)
  - 319th Transportation Brigade, at Camp Parks (CA)
    - Headquarters and Headquarters Company, 319th Transportation Brigade, at Camp Parks (CA)
    - 385th Transportation Battalion (Terminal), in Tacoma (WA)
      - Headquarters and Headquarters Detachment, 385th Transportation Battalion (Terminal), in Tacoma (WA)
      - 332nd Transportation Detachment (Movement Control Team), in Tacoma (WA)
      - 477th Transportation Company (Inland Cargo Transfer Company — ICTC), in Marysville (WA)
      - 483rd Quartermaster Company (Field Service) (Modular), in Marysville (WA)
      - 804th Transportation Detachment (Movement Control Team), in Tacoma (WA)
      - 948th Transportation Company (Seaport Operations), in Marysville (WA)
      - 970th Transportation Detachment (Movement Control Team), in Eugene (OR)
    - 483rd Transportation Battalion (Terminal), in Vallejo (CA)
      - Headquarters and Headquarters Detachment, 483rd Transportation Battalion (Terminal), in Vallejo (CA)
      - 238th Transportation Company (Inland Cargo Transfer Company — ICTC), at Camp Parks (CA)
      - 711th Transportation Company (Seaport Operations), in Concord (CA)
  - 652nd Regional Support Group, at Fort Harrison (MT)
    - Headquarters and Headquarters Company, 652nd Regional Support Group, at Fort Harrison (MT)
    - 814th Transportation Battalion (Motor), in Boise (ID)
      - Headquarters and Headquarters Detachment, 814th Transportation Battalion (Motor), in Boise (ID)
      - 376th Transportation Medium Truck Company (Cargo) (EAB Linehaul), in Missoula (MT)
      - 592nd Ordnance Company (Ammo) (Modular), in Billings (MT)
        - 2nd Platoon, 592nd Ordnance Company (Ammo) (Modular), in Butte (MT)
      - 650th Human Resources Company, at Fort Harrison (MT)
        - 2nd Platoon, 650th Human Resources Company, at Fort Douglas (UT)
      - 651st Quartermaster Company (Water Purification and Distribution), in Evansville (WY)
      - 660th Ordnance Company (Ammo) (Modular), in Pocatello (ID)
      - 823rd Transportation Detachment (Movement Control Team), in Missoula (MT)
      - 889th Quartermaster Company (Supply), in Great Falls (MT)
        - Detachment 1, 889th Quartermaster Company (Supply), in Kalispell (MT)
      - 949th Transportation Detachment (Movement Control Team), in Boise (ID)
      - 971st Transportation Detachment (Movement Control Team), in Sheridan (WY)
      - 1016th Quartermaster Company (Petroleum Pipeline and Terminal Operation), in Twin Falls (ID)
  - 654th Regional Support Group, in Tacoma (WA)
    - Headquarters and Headquarters Company, 654th Regional Support Group, in Tacoma (WA)
    - 382nd Combat Sustainment Support Battalion, at Joint Base Lewis–McChord (WA)
      - Headquarters and Headquarters Company, 382nd Combat Sustainment Support Battalion, at Joint Base Lewis–McChord (WA)
      - 291st Transportation Detachment (Trailer Transfer Point Team), at Joint Base Lewis–McChord (WA)
      - 737th Transportation Medium Truck Company (POL, 7.5K GAL) (EAB Linehaul), in Yakima (WA)
      - 881st Quartermaster Company (Field Feeding), in Tacoma (WA)
        - 1004th Quartermaster Detachment (Field Feeding Team), in Salt Lake City (UT)
        - 1005th Quartermaster Detachment (Field Feeding Team), in Spokane (WA)
        - 1006th Quartermaster Detachment (Field Feeding Team), in Boise (ID)
        - 1007th Quartermaster Detachment (Field Feeding Team), at Fort Harrison (MT)
      - 909th Human Resources Company, in Bothell (WA)
        - Detachment 1, 909th Human Resources Company, at Camp Withycombe (OR)

Abbreviations: POL — Petroleum Oil Lubricants; EAB — Echelon Above Brigade
