= Operation Desert Farewell =

In the first Gulf War, Operation Desert Farewell was the name given to the return of American units and equipment to the United States in 1991 after the liberation of Kuwait. Some U.S. Marine Corps units were diverted en route to conduct humanitarian assistance in flooded Bangladesh (Sea Angel). Also called Desert Calm or Peace Walker in some documents.
