= 319th Military Intelligence Brigade =

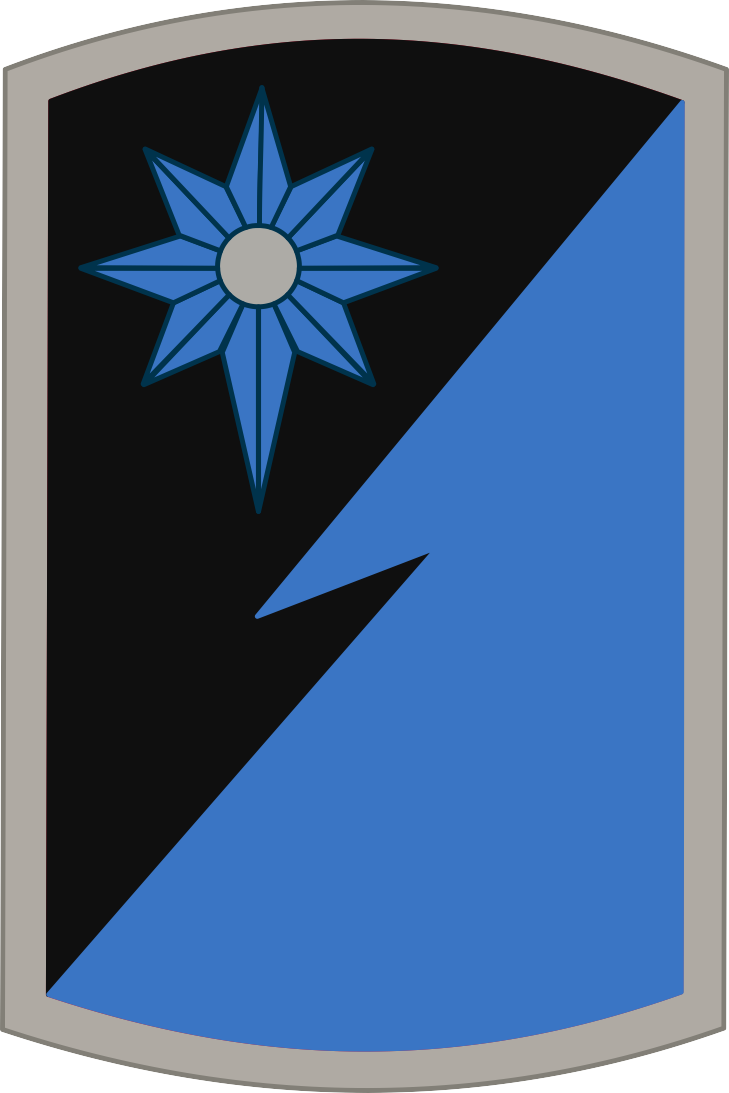
- Active: 1948-1995
- Country: United States
- Branch: US Army Reserve
- Role: Intelligence
- Size: Brigade
- Garrison/HQ: Fort Lewis, Washington
- Motto: Eyes of the Pacific

Insignia
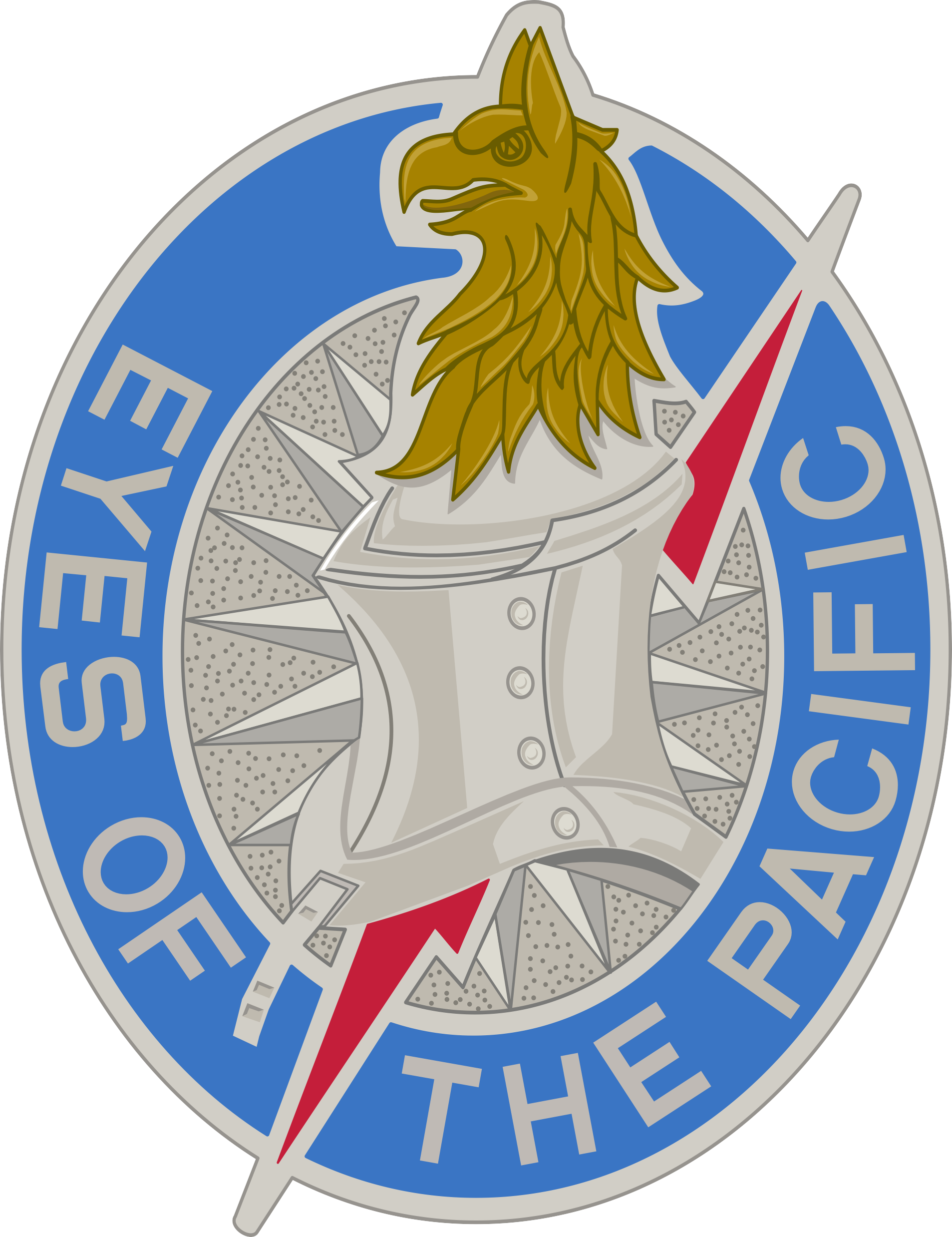
- 319th Military Intelligence Brigade DUI

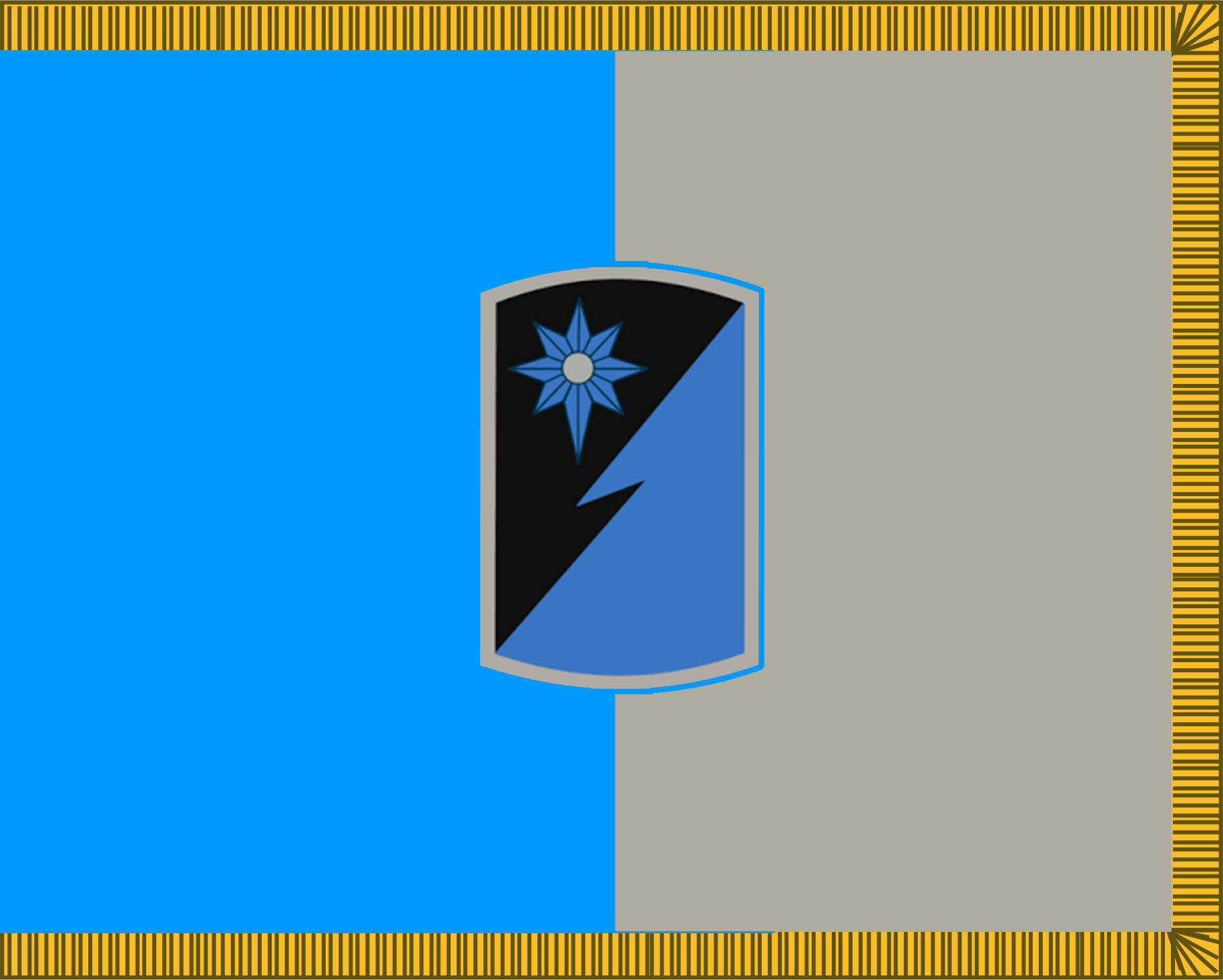
- 319th Military Intelligence Brigade Flag

The 319th Military Intelligence Brigade was a unit of the US Army Reserve activated in 1948 in Springfield, Massachusetts. as the 319th Headquarters Intelligence Detachment. In 1950 it was redesignated Headquarters, 319th Military Intelligence Group in San Francisco, California. The unit moved again in 1988 and was redesignated 319th Military Intelligence Brigade at Fort Lewis, Washington. The unit was deactivated in 1995.
