= 103rd Expeditionary Sustainment Command =

- Shoulder Sleeve Insignia
- Active: 1921 - present
- Country: United States
- Branch: United States Army Reserve
- Role: Sustainment Command (Expeditionary)
- Part of: 79th Theater Sustainment Command
- Reserve Center: Fort Des Moines Joint Reserve Complex, Iowa
- Motto: We Succeed!
- Engagements: Iraq War; War in Afghanistan; 2026 Iran War

Commanders
- Current commander: Brigadier General Clint Barnes

Insignia
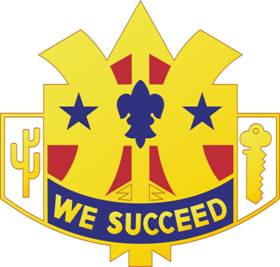
- Distinctive Unit Insignia

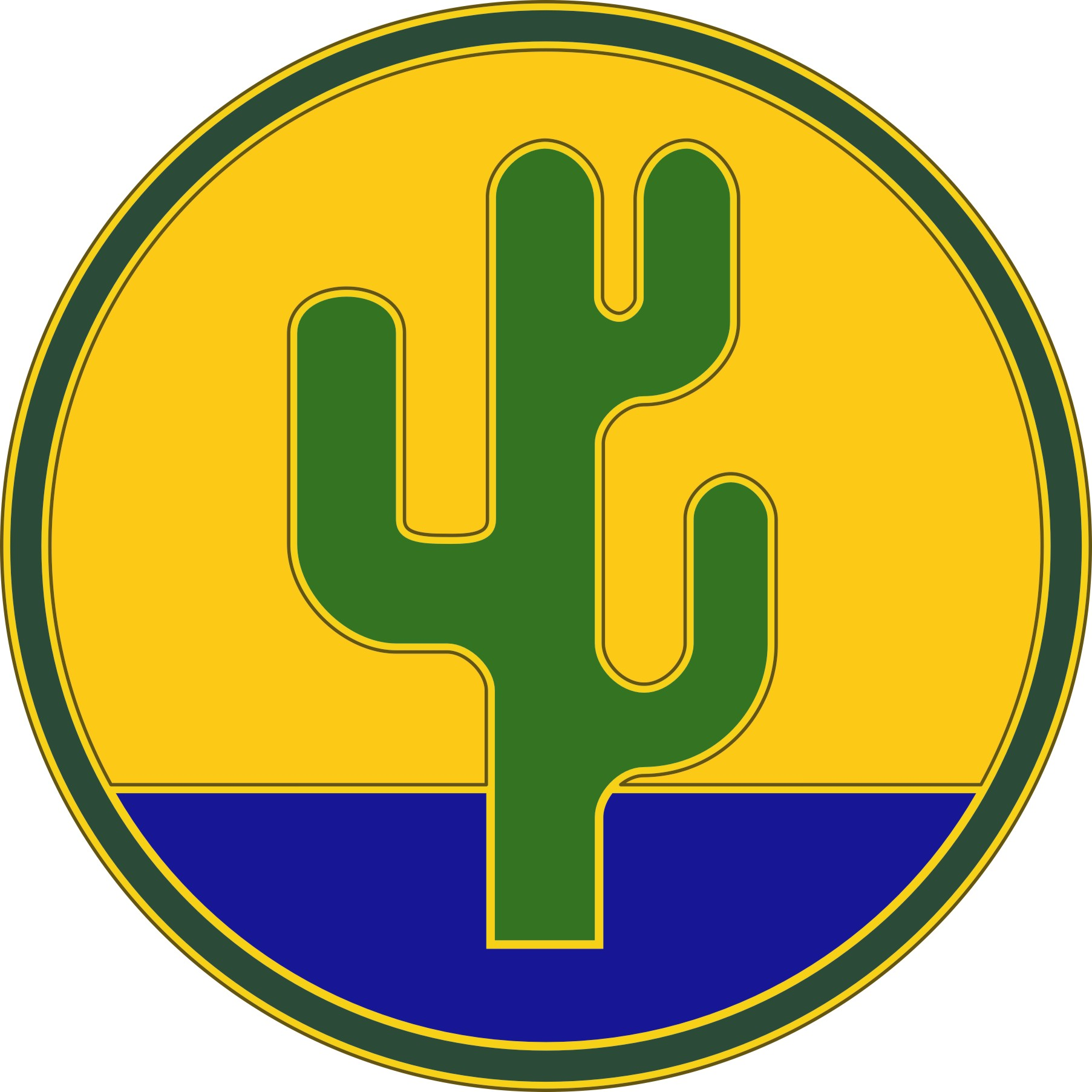
- Combat Service Identification Badge

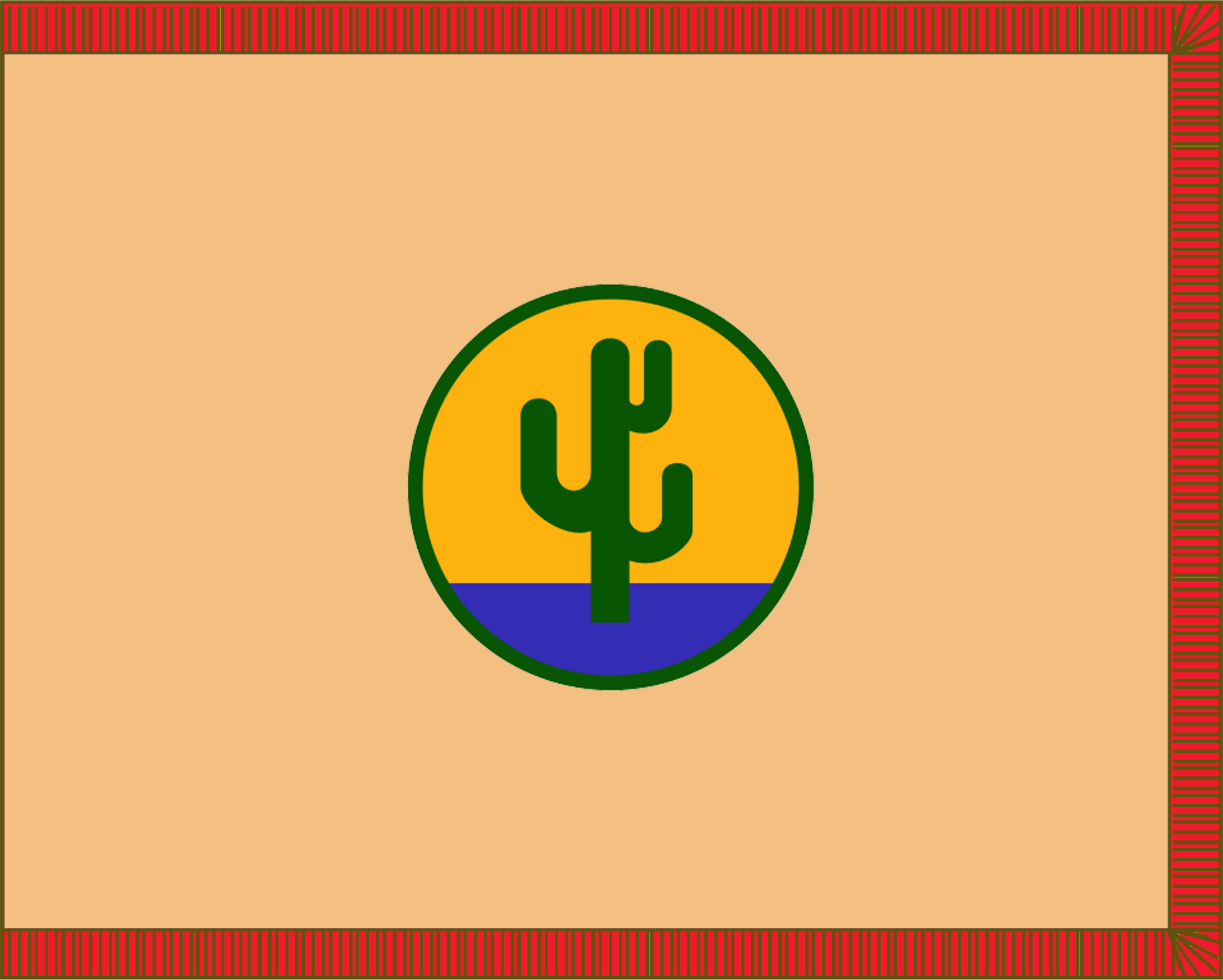
- 103rd Expeditionary Sustainment Command Flag

The 103rd Expeditionary Sustainment Command (103 ESC) is a subordinate command of 79th Theater Sustainment Command (United States). The 103rd Expeditionary Sustainment Command is located on the Fort Des Moines Joint Reserve Complex in Des Moines, Iowa. The command comprises 62 subordinate units and has command and control of almost 6,000 Army Reserve Soldiers throughout the midwestern United States to include locations in Iowa, Minnesota, Wisconsin, Michigan and Illinois. The 103rd Expeditionary Sustainment Command provides trained and ready forces in support of global contingency operations. On order, the 103rd ESC is prepared to deploy and provide command and control to all assigned, attached, and operationally controlled units and will provide sustainment planning, guidance and support to forces in the area of operations.

== Organization ==
The 103rd Expeditionary Sustainment Command is a subordinate unit of the 79th Theater Sustainment Command. As of January 2026 the command consists of the following units:

- 103rd Expeditionary Sustainment Command, in Des Moines (IA)
  - Headquarters and Headquarters Company, 103rd Expeditionary Sustainment Command, in Des Moines (IA)
  - 321st Sustainment Brigade, in Baton Rouge (LA)
    - 321st Special Troops Battalion, in Baton Rouge (LA)
      - Headquarters and Headquarters Company, 321st Sustainment Brigade, in Baton Rouge (LA)
      - 831st Brigade Signal Company (MEB/CAB/SB), in Baton Rouge (LA)
    - 365th Combat Sustainment Support Battalion, in Jackson (MS)
      - Headquarters and Headquarters Company, 365th Combat Sustainment Support Battalion, in Jackson (MS)
      - 173rd Quartermaster Company (Petroleum Pipeline and Terminal Operation), in Greenwood (MS)
      - 296th Transportation Medium Truck Company (POL, 5K GAL) (EAB Linehaul), in Brookhaven (MS)
        - Detachment 1, 296th Transportation Medium Truck Company (POL, 5K GAL) (EAB Linehaul), in Hattiesburg (MS)
      - 647th Transportation Medium Truck Company (Cargo) (EAB Linehaul), in Laurel (MS)
        - Detachment 1, 647th Transportation Medium Truck Company (Cargo) (EAB Linehaul), in Meridian (MS)
      - 658th Quartermaster Company (Supply), in Tupelo (MS)
        - 2nd Platoon, 658th Quartermaster Company (Supply), in Starkville (MS)
      - 850th Transportation Medium Truck Company (PLS) (EAB Tactical), in Lyon (MS)
      - 894th Quartermaster Company (Petroleum Support), in Jackson (MS)
    - 375th Combat Sustainment Support Battalion, in Mobile (AL)
      - Headquarters and Headquarters Company, 375th Combat Sustainment Support Battalion, in Mobile (AL)
      - 194th Human Resources Company, in Bossier City (LA)
      - 303rd Quartermaster Company (Water Purification and Distribution), in Lake Charles (LA)
      - 495th Transportation Company (Inland Cargo Transfer Company — ICTC), in Jonesboro (AR)
      - 498th Transportation Medium Truck Company (PLS) (EAB Tactical), in Mobile (AL)
      - 342nd Transportation Detachment (Movement Control Team), in Baton Rouge (LA)
      - 540th Transportation Detachment (Movement Control Team), in Baton Rouge (LA)
      - 616th Quartermaster Company (Petroleum Support), in Lafayette (LA)
  - 644th Regional Support Group, at Fort Snelling (MN)
    - Headquarters and Headquarters Company, 644th Regional Support Group, at Fort Snelling (MN)
    - 457th Transportation Battalion (Motor), at Fort Snelling (MN)
      - Headquarters and Headquarters Detachment, 457th Transportation Battalion (Motor), at Fort Snelling (MN)
      - 189th Transportation Detachment (Trailer Transfer Point Team), in Council Bluffs (IA)
      - 203rd Transportation Company (Inland Cargo Transfer Company — ICTC), in Arden Hills (MN)
      - 322nd Ordnance Company (Support Maintenance), in Arden Hills (MN)
      - 353rd Transportation Medium Truck Company (POL, 7.5K GAL) (EAB Linehaul), in Buffalo (MN)
      - 825th Quartermaster Detachment (Tactical Water Distribution Team) (Hoseline), in Willmar (MN)
      - 847th Human Resources Company, at Fort Snelling (MN)
      - 960th Quartermaster Company (Petroleum Support), in Sioux City (IA)
        - 1st Platoon, 960th Quartermaster Company (Petroleum Support), in Cedar Rapids (IA)
  - 645th Regional Support Group, in Southfield (MI)
    - Headquarters and Headquarters Company, 645th Regional Support Group, in Southfield (MI)
    - 406th Combat Sustainment Support Battalion, in Ann Arbor (MI)
      - Headquarters and Headquarters Company, 406th Combat Sustainment Support Battalion, in Ann Arbor (MI)
      - 13th Quartermaster Detachment (Petroleum Liaison Team), in Livonia (MI)
      - 180th Transportation Medium Truck Company (Cargo) (EAB Linehaul), in Muskegon (MI)
        - Detachment 1, 180th Transportation Medium Truck Company (Cargo) (EAB Linehaul), in Bay City (MI)
      - 182nd Transportation Medium Truck Company (POL, 7.5K GAL) (EAB Linehaul), in Traverse City (MI)
        - Detachment 1, 182nd Transportation Medium Truck Company (POL, 7.5K GAL) (EAB Linehaul), in Bay City (MI)
      - 301st Quartermaster Company (Water Purification and Distribution), in Grand Rapids (MI)
        - 1st Platoon, 301st Quartermaster Company (Water Purification and Distribution), in Augusta (MI)
      - 401st Transportation Medium Truck Company (PLS) (EAB Tactical), in Augusta (MI)
      - 431st Quartermaster Company (Petroleum Pipeline and Terminal Operation), in Augusta (MI)
      - 858th Transportation Detachment (Movement Control Team), in Bay City (MI)
      - 919th Transportation Company (Inland Cargo Transfer Company — ICTC), in Saginaw (MI)
      - 952nd Quartermaster Company (Petroleum Pipeline and Terminal Operation), in Livonia (MI)
  - 646th Regional Support Group, in Madison (WI)
    - Headquarters and Headquarters Company, 646th Regional Support Group, in Madison (WI)
    - 687th Combat Sustainment Support Battalion, in Wausau (WI)
      - Headquarters and Headquarters Company, 687th Combat Sustainment Support Battalion, in Wausau (WI)
      - 376th Financial Management Support Unit, in Wausau (WI)
      - 377th Ordnance Company (Support Maintenance), in Manitowoc (WI)
      - 395th Ordnance Company (Ammo) (Modular), in Neenah (WI)
      - 753rd Quartermaster Company (Water Purification and Distribution), in Green Bay (WI)
      - 826th Ordnance Company (Ammo) (Modular), in Madison (WI)
      - 980th Quartermaster Company (Supply), in Eau Claire (WI)
  - 649th Regional Support Group, in Cedar Rapids (IA)
    - Headquarters and Headquarters Company, 649th Regional Support Group, in Cedar Rapids (IA)
    - 419th Transportation Battalion (Movement Control), in Bartonville (IL)
      - Headquarters and Headquarters Detachment, 419th Transportation Battalion (Movement Control), in Bartonville (IL)
      - 236th Transportation Company (Inland Cargo Transfer Company — ICTC), in Decatur (IL)
      - 238th Quartermaster Company (Field Feeding), at Fort Sheridan (IL)
      - 243rd Transportation Detachment (Trailer Transfer Point Team), in Mount Vernon (IL)
      - 310th Transportation Medium Truck Company (PLS) (EAB Tactical), in Quincy (IL)
      - 458th Transportation Detachment (Movement Control Team), in Mount Vernon (IL)
      - 657th Transportation Detachment (Movement Control Team), in Mount Vernon (IL)
      - 724th Transportation Medium Truck Company (POL, 5K GAL) (EAB Linehaul), in Bartonville (IL)
      - 733rd Ordnance Company (Support Maintenance), in Canton (IL)
        - Detachment 1, 733rd Ordnance Company (Support Maintenance), in Granite City (IL)
        - Detachment 2, 733rd Ordnance Company (Support Maintenance), in Indianapolis (IN)
      - 958th Transportation Detachment (Movement Control Team), in Mount Vernon (IL)
      - 969th Transportation Detachment (Movement Control Team), in Mount Vernon (IL)
      - 1008th Quartermaster Company (Field Service) (Modular), in Granite City (IL)
        - Detachment 1, 1008th Quartermaster Company (Field Service) (Modular), in Peru (IL)
    - 470th Transportation Battalion (Movement Control), in Elwood (IL)
      - Headquarters and Headquarters Detachment, 470th Transportation Battalion (Movement Control), in Elwood (IL)
      - 251st Transportation Company (Inland Cargo Transfer Company — ICTC), in Elwood (IL)
      - 334th Quartermaster Company (Petroleum Support), in Elwood (IL)
      - 445th Transportation Medium Truck Company (PLS) (EAB Tactical), in Waterloo (IA)
        - Detachment 1, 445th Transportation Medium Truck Company (PLS) (EAB Tactical), in Sac City (IA)
        - Detachment 2, 445th Transportation Medium Truck Company (PLS) (EAB Tactical), in Cherokee (IA)
      - 459th Transportation Medium Truck Company (PLS) (EAB Tactical), in Elwood (IL)
      - 516th Transportation Detachment (Movement Control Team), at Fort Sheridan (IL)
      - 527th Transportation Detachment (Movement Control Team), in Decorah (IA)
      - 940th Transportation Detachment (Movement Control Team), at Fort Sheridan (IL)
      - 941st Transportation Detachment (Movement Control Team), at Fort Sheridan (IL)
      - 956th Transportation Detachment (Movement Control Team), at Fort Sheridan (IL)

Abbreviations: PLS — Palletized Load System; POL — Petroleum Oil Lubricants; EAB — Echelon Above Brigade

== History ==
The 103rd Expeditionary Sustainment Command initially formed as the 103rd Infantry Division (United States), organized as a reserve division on 9 September 1921, in Denver, Colorado. It was ordered into active service on 15 November 1942 at Camp Claiborne, Louisiana.

The 103rd Infantry Division was activated as a reserve division on 7 May 1947 in Des Moines, Iowa. In February 1963, its combat elements were redesignated and reorganized as the 205th Infantry Brigade and the 103rd Operational Headquarters. In June of that year, that headquarters was redesignated 103rd Command Headquarters (Divisional). In December 1965, it was reorganized as the 103rd Support Brigade. The 103rd Support Brigade was redesignated and reorganized as the 103rd Corps Support Command (COSCOM) in September 1977. The 103rd COSCOM was the first corps support command in the U.S. Army Reserve.

On 15 September 1993, the 103rd COSCOM inactivated. Out of the inactivation of the 103rd COSCOM was the birth of two new reserve units: the 19th Theater Army Area Command (CONUS) and the 3rd COSCOM (CONUS).

On 14 February 2006 the 103rd was redesignated as Headquarters and Headquarters Company, 103rd Expeditionary Sustainment Command. The 103rd Expeditionary Sustainment Command re-activated as a reserve command effective 16 September 2006. Although the division was officially relocated to the Iowa and Minnesota area in 1947, its Cactus Patch still reflects the unit's original geographic locations. The 103rd has transformed from an infantry division, to a support brigade, to a corps support command, to an Expeditionary Sustainment Command.

=== Operation Iraqi Freedom ===
In April 2010, the 103rd ESC deployed to Iraq in support of operations Iraqi Freedom and New Dawn and provided logistics and support to forces throughout the country. This was the 103rd ESC's first deployment as an expeditionary sustainment command. The 103rd ESC's mission in Iraq was to reduce the footprint of the U.S. military presence in Iraq by providing logistical support and assistance with the responsible drawdown of equipment while simultaneously sustaining troops in theater. More than half the soldiers currently assigned to the 103rd ESC have been deployed previously to Iraq or Afghanistan with different units in support of other missions.

=== Operation Enduring Freedom ===
On 16 June 2013, Soldiers from the 103rd ESC were deployed to Afghanistan in support of Operation Enduring Freedom (OEF) and provide Combat Service Support capabilities within Regional Command East (RC East) and Regional Command North (RC North), in support of Operation Enduring Freedom. The deployed Soldiers came from the 203rd Transportation Company (Inland) to participate in this deployment as the 203rd Inland Cargo Transportation Company. The unit was officially deployed under Operation Spartan Shield.

=== Operation Spartan Shield ===
In August 2025, the 103rd ESC deployed to Kuwait as part of Operation Spartan Shield. In March 2026, six soldiers were killed in Iranian missile strikes on Kuwait, a retaliation for the then-ongoing Operation Epic Fury. The Soldiers were WO3 Robert Marzan of Sacramento, California, 53; MAJ Jeffrey O'Brien of Indianola, Iowa; CPT Cody Khork of Winter Haven, Florida, 35; SFC Noah Tietjens of Bellevue, Nebraska, 42; SFC Nicole Amor of White Bear Lake, Minnesota, 39; and SGT (posthumous promotion from SPC) Declan Coady of West Des Moines, Iowa, 20.

== Unit Insignia ==
=== Shoulder Sleeve Insignia (SSI) ===
On a yellow disc 2 1/2 inches (6.4 cm) in diameter, a blue horizontal base, overall a green giant cactus, all with a 1/8 inch (0.32 cm) Army green border. The cactus represents the home area of the unit in the Southwest when it was first organized and is symbolic of the unit's nickname.

The shoulder sleeve insignia was originally approved for the 103rd Division on 14 October 1922 and the approval specified the segment at the bottom of the disc to be the color of the branch of service. On 18 June 1935, the authorization was amended to standardize the design with the segment at the bottom of the disc to be blue. It was redesignated for the 103rd Command Headquarters (Divisional) on 23 October 1963. It was redesignated for the 103rd Support Command on 29 March 1978. The insignia was redesignated effective 16 September 1993, for the 103rd Infantry Division. It was redesignated effective 16 September 2006, for the 103rd Expeditionary Sustainment Command and updated to add a symbolism.

=== Distinctive unit insignia (DUI) ===
A gold color metal and enamel device 1 3/16 inches (3.0 cm) in height overall consisting of a gold heraldic millrind supporting a gold arrow, point up, and bearing upon its crossbar a blue fleur-de-lis between two blue five pointed stars; all upon a scarlet field and above a blue concave scroll, with ends white and folded vertically terminating at the outer edge of the crossbar, inscribed on the blue portion "WE SUCCEED" and on the white portion a cactus on the left side and a Yale key on the right, both vertical and gold.

Buff (gold) and scarlet are the colors associated with US Army Support units. The millrind is symbolic of strength and support; the stars denote military leadership and the arrow suggests combat readiness. The cactus refers to the unit's early history as the Cactus Division and the key to its later redesignation to a Support Brigade. The fleur-de-lis and two stars represent World War II combat service in the Rhineland, Ardennes-Alsace and Central Europe campaigns. The colors blue, white and scarlet also refer to the flag of Iowa, location of the unit's headquarters.

The distinctive unit insignia was originally approved for the 103d Support Command (Corps) on 10 August 1982. It was redesignated effective 16 September 2006, for the 103d Sustainment Command with the description updated.

=== Combat Service Identification Badge (CSIB) ===
A gold color metal and enamel device 2 inches (5.1 cm) in diameter consisting of a design similar to the shoulder sleeve insignia.
