= 645th Regional Support Group =

- Active: 1999-present
- Country: United States
- Branch: United States Army Reserve
- Size: Brigade
- Part of: 103rd Sustainment Command (Expeditionary)
- Garrison/HQ: Southfield, Michigan

Insignia
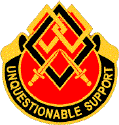
- 645TH REGIONAL SUPPORT GROUP DUI

645th Regional Support Group is a United States Army Reserve unit which controls a Combat Sustainment Support Battalion within Michigan.

== Organization ==
The 645th Regional Support Group is a subordinate unit of the 103rd Expeditionary Sustainment Command. As of January 2026 the group consists of the following units:

- 645th Regional Support Group, in Southfield (MI)
  - Headquarters and Headquarters Company, 645th Regional Support Group, in Southfield (MI)
  - 406th Combat Sustainment Support Battalion, in Ann Arbor (MI)
    - Headquarters and Headquarters Company, 406th Combat Sustainment Support Battalion, in Ann Arbor (MI)
    - 13th Quartermaster Detachment (Petroleum Liaison Team), in Livonia (MI)
    - 180th Transportation Medium Truck Company (Cargo) (EAB Linehaul), in Muskegon (MI)
      - Detachment 1, 180th Transportation Medium Truck Company (Cargo) (EAB Linehaul), in Bay City (MI)
    - 182nd Transportation Medium Truck Company (POL, 7.5K GAL) (EAB Linehaul), in Traverse City (MI)
      - Detachment 1, 182nd Transportation Medium Truck Company (POL, 7.5K GAL) (EAB Linehaul), in Bay City (MI)
    - 301st Quartermaster Company (Water Purification and Distribution), in Grand Rapids (MI)
      - 1st Platoon, 301st Quartermaster Company (Water Purification and Distribution), in Augusta (MI)
    - 401st Transportation Medium Truck Company (PLS) (EAB Tactical), in Augusta (MI)
    - 431st Quartermaster Company (Petroleum Pipeline and Terminal Operation), in Augusta (MI)
    - 858th Transportation Detachment (Movement Control Team), in Bay City (MI)
    - 919th Transportation Company (Inland Cargo Transfer Company — ICTC), in Saginaw (MI)
    - 952nd Quartermaster Company (Petroleum Pipeline and Terminal Operation), in Livonia (MI)

Abbreviations: PLS — Palletized Load System; POL — Petroleum Oil Lubricants; EAB — Echelon Above Brigade
