= 644th Regional Support Group =

- Country: United States of America
- Branch: United States Army
- Type: Support Group
- Role: Provide command and control of assigned units
- Part of: 103rd Sustainment Command (Expeditionary)
- Garrison/HQ: Fort Snelling, Minnesota
- Motto: "Northern Star"

Insignia
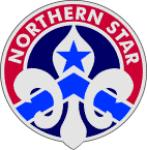
- Distinctive Unit Insignia

The 644th Regional Support Group (644th RSG) is a subordinate command of 103rd Sustainment Command (Expeditionary). The 644th RSG was formerly called the 644th Area Support Group. under the 88th Regional Support Group prior to being transferred to the 103rd ESC. It controls a Transportation battalion within Minnesota and Iowa.

== Organization ==
The 644th Regional Support Group is a subordinate unit of the 103rd Expeditionary Sustainment Command. As of January 2026 the group consists of the following units:

- 644th Regional Support Group, at Fort Snelling (MN)
  - Headquarters and Headquarters Company, 644th Regional Support Group, at Fort Snelling (MN)
  - 457th Transportation Battalion (Motor), at Fort Snelling (MN)
    - Headquarters and Headquarters Detachment, 457th Transportation Battalion (Motor), at Fort Snelling (MN)
    - 189th Transportation Detachment (Trailer Transfer Point Team), in Council Bluffs (IA)
    - 203rd Transportation Company (Inland Cargo Transfer Company — ICTC), in Arden Hills (MN)
    - 322nd Ordnance Company (Support Maintenance), in Arden Hills (MN)
    - 353rd Transportation Medium Truck Company (POL, 7.5K GAL) (EAB Linehaul), in Buffalo (MN)
    - 825th Quartermaster Detachment (Tactical Water Distribution Team) (Hoseline), in Willmar (MN)
    - 847th Human Resources Company, at Fort Snelling (MN)
    - 960th Quartermaster Company (Petroleum Support), in Sioux City (IA)
      - 1st Platoon, 960th Quartermaster Company (Petroleum Support), in Cedar Rapids (IA)

Abbreviations: PLS — Palletized Load System; POL — Petroleum Oil Lubricants; EAB — Echelon Above Brigade

== Operation Enduring Freedom ==
A detachment of Soldiers from 644th RSG mobilized to Joint Base McGuire-Dix-Lakehurst as part of TF Scorpion and deployed to Afghanistan as part of NATO Training Mission-Afghanistan.
