= Emberménil =

- Commune
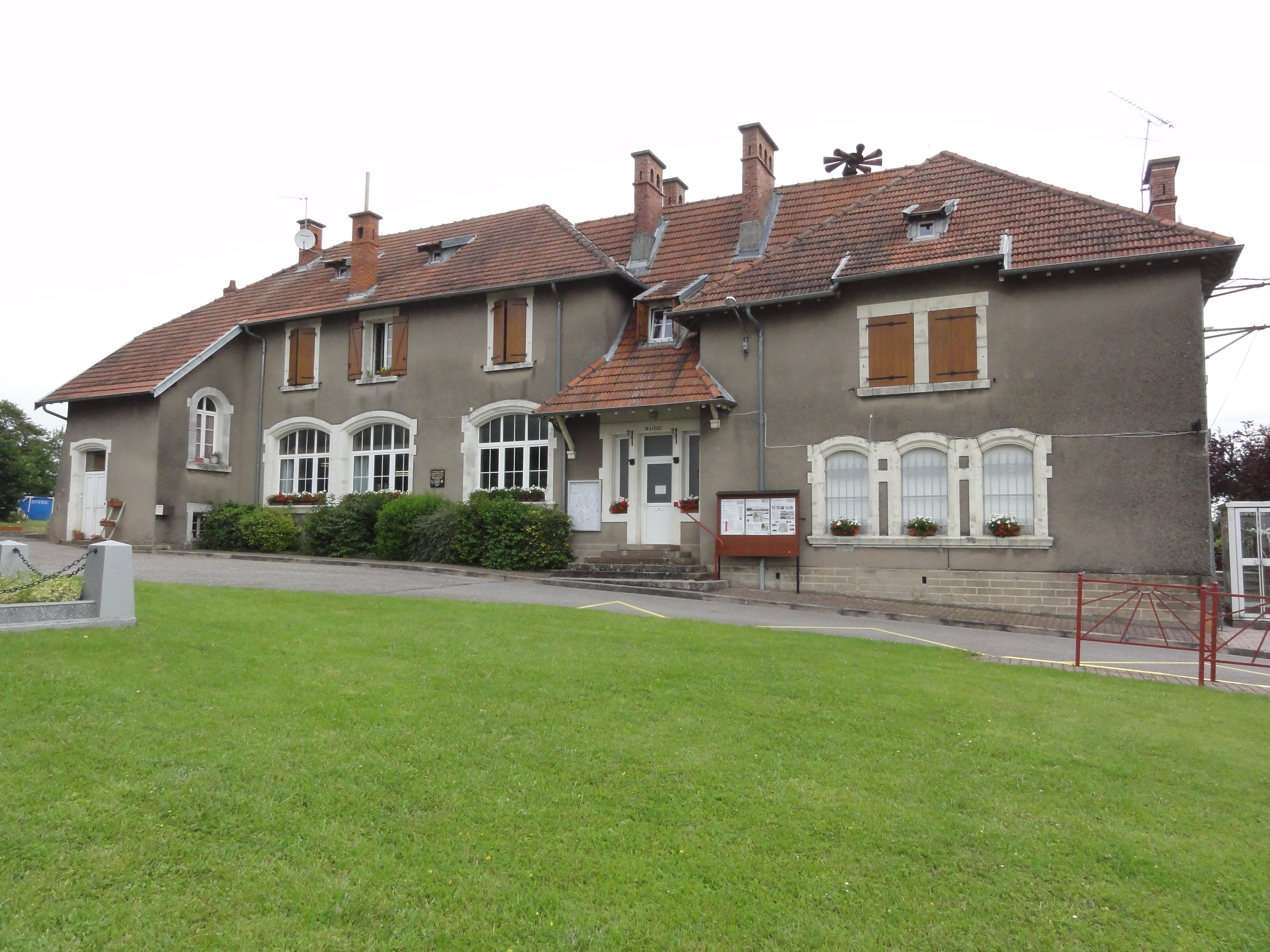
- The town hall in Emberménil

- Coat of arms
- Location of Emberménil
- Location within France Location within Grand Est
- Coordinates: 48°37′47″N 6°41′47″E
- Country: France
- Region: Grand Est
- Department: Meurthe-et-Moselle
- Arrondissement: Lunéville
- Canton: Baccarat

Government
  - Mayor (2024–2026): Jean-Marie Armbruster
- Area^{1}: 14.39 km^{2} (5.56 sq mi)
- Elevation: 250 m (820 ft)
- Highest elevation: 313 m (1,027 ft)
- Lowest elevation: 234 m (768 ft)
- Population (2023): 229
  - Density: 15.9/km^{2} (41.2/sq mi)
- Time zone: UTC+01:00 (CET)
  - Summer (DST): UTC+02:00 (CEST)
- INSEE/Postal code: 54177 /54370
- ^{1} French Land Register data, which excludes lakes, ponds, glaciers > 1 km^{2} (0.386 sq mi or 247 acres) and river estuaries.

Emberménil (French pronunciation: [ɑ̃bɛʁmenil]) is a commune in the Meurthe-et-Moselle department in north-eastern France.

== See also ==
- Communes of the Meurthe-et-Moselle department
