= Tactical operations center =

Command post for police, paramilitary, or military operations

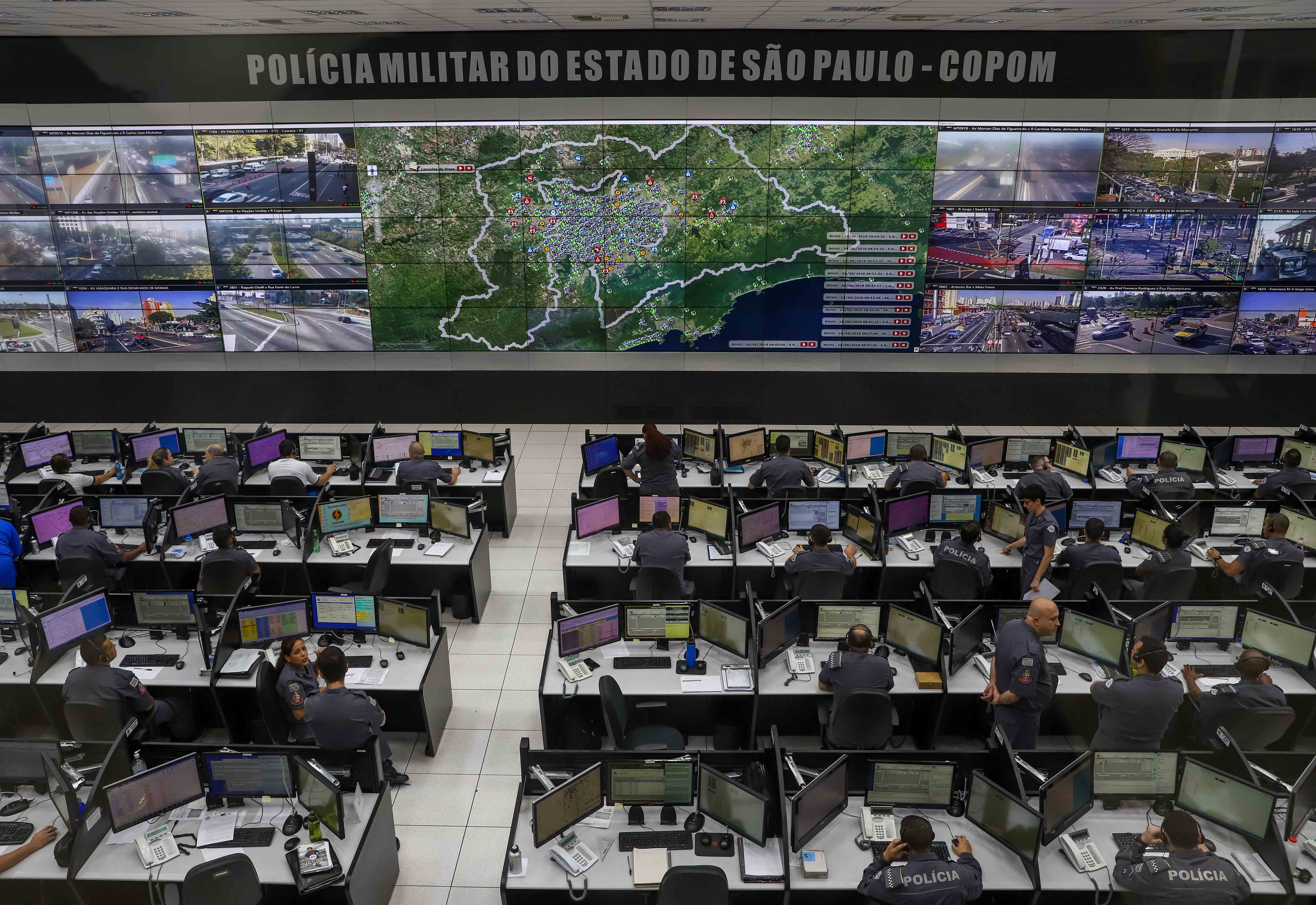
Tactical operations center of the Military Police of São Paulo State in São Paulo, Brazil

A tactical operations center (TOC) is a command post for police, paramilitary, or military operations. A TOC usually includes a small group of specially trained officers or military personnel who guide members of an active tactical element during a mission.

Most permanent tactical operations centers are highly technical and contain a number of advanced computer systems for monitoring operational progress and maintaining communications with operators in the field. One of the best-known TOCs is NORAD, which conducts North American airspace defense operations.

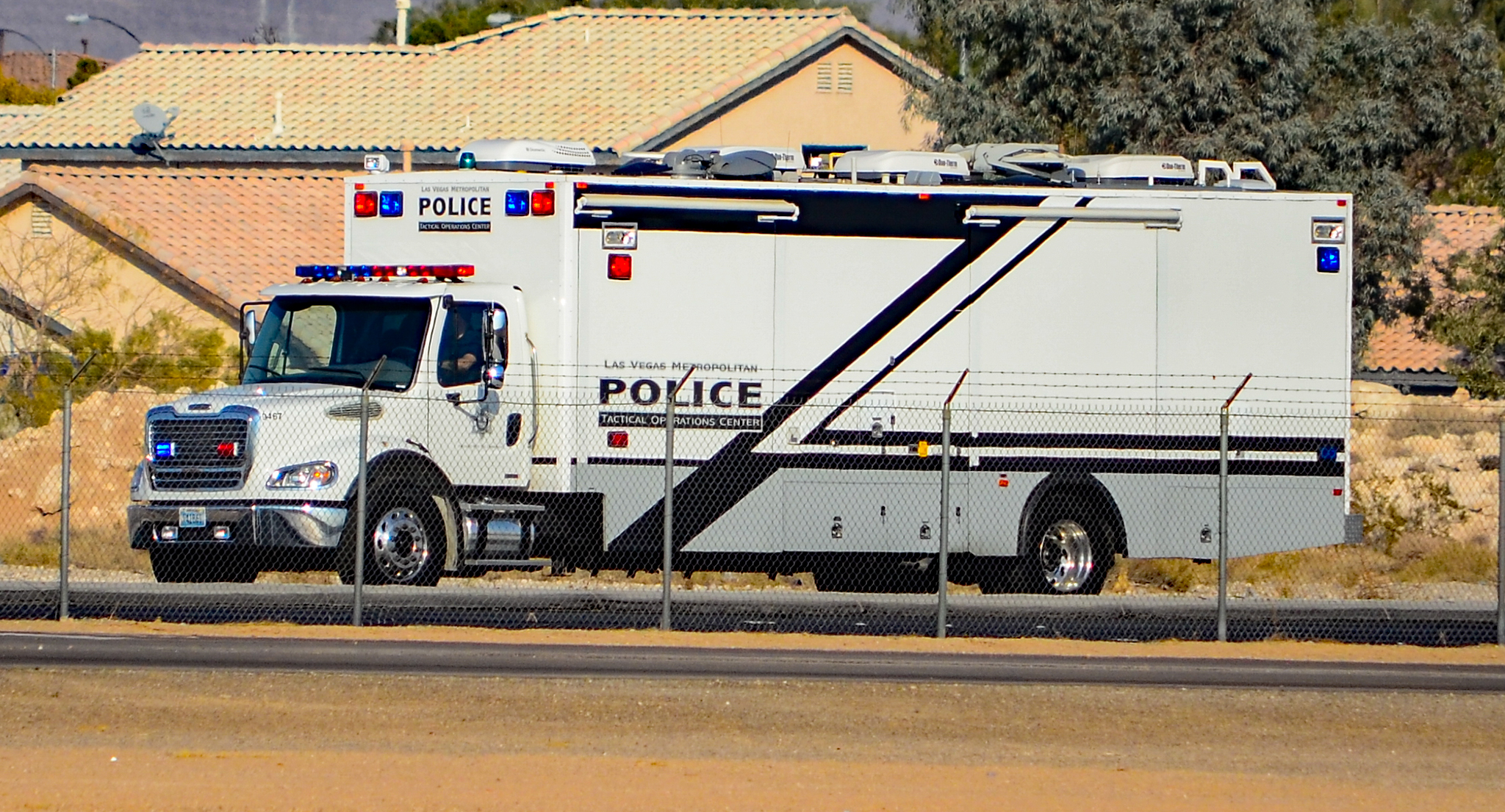
A Las Vegas Metropolitan Police Department TOC truck

TOC officers are usually positioned in a way that enables line-of-sight communication between team members, as well as overall communication with the TOC operations officer (or commander). Common configurations include center-facing monitors and against the wall monitors. Larger TOCs have a location where senior leaders are able to sit and observe operations of subordinate units. Smaller TOCs and field TOCs can be created in the back of vans and trucks, as well as in tents and buildings by setting up computers and linking in communication equipment.

== Military usage of TOC ==
A tactical operations center is not only used by police, but also by the military. They can command in different ways, with a TOC like NORAD being a TOC that is stationed in one place, while there are other TOC's, that are Mobile. Mobile TOC's are easily used, as they allow infantry have a place to stay, while having full communication with the main command center.

== See also ==
- Emergency operations center
