= 319th Transportation Brigade =

- Active: 2024-present
- Country: United States
- Branch: United States Army Reserve
- Role: Transportation
- Size: Brigade
- Part of: 364th Expeditionary Sustainment Command
- Garrison/HQ: Camp Parks, Dublin, California
- Motto: Accent on Action

Commanders
- Current commander: COL Alfred A. Chang
- Command Sergeant Major: CSM Tiniki Bussey

Insignia
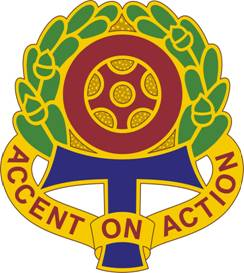
- 319th Transportation Brigade DUI

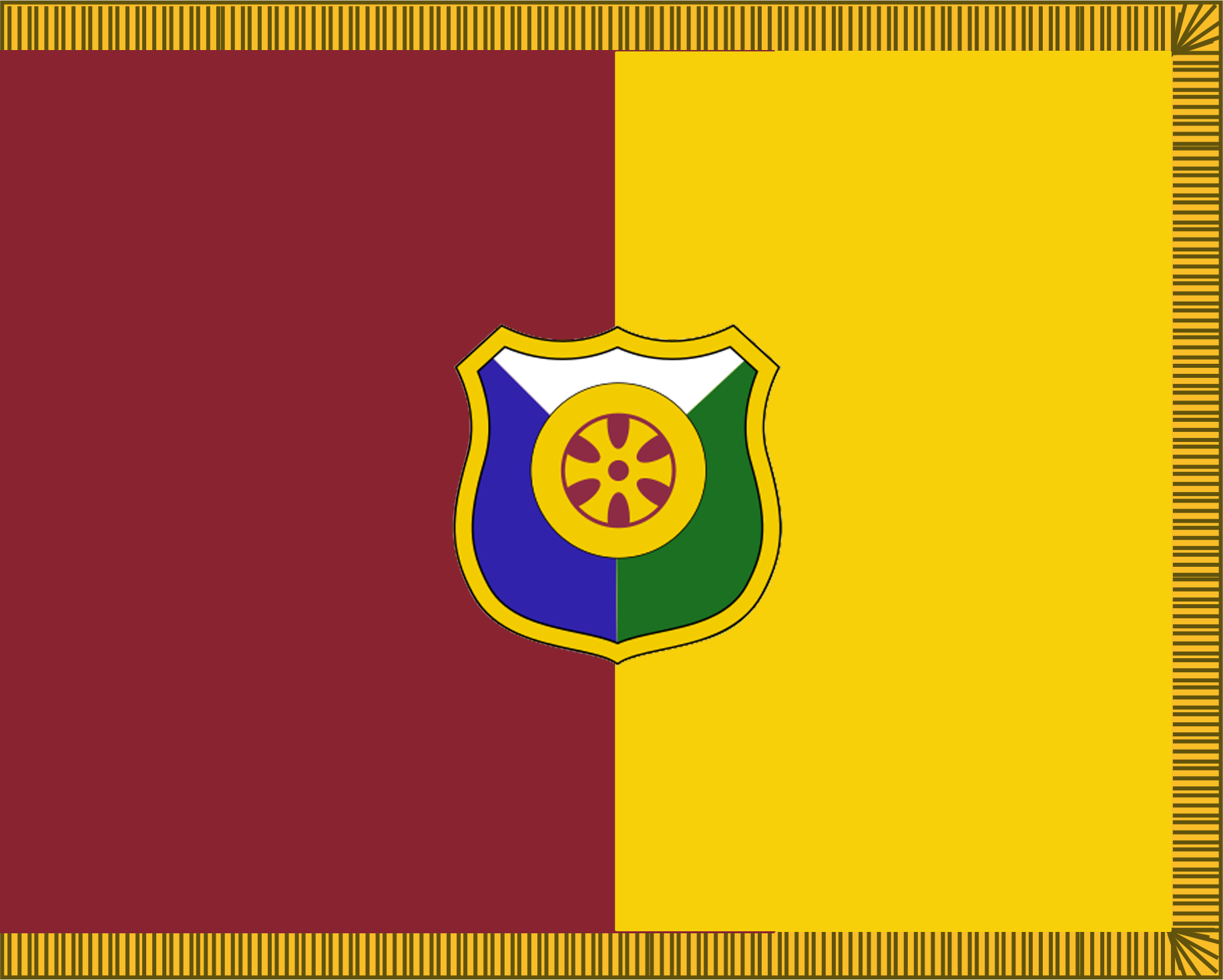
- 319th Transportation Brigade Flag

The 319th Transportation Brigade is a unit of the US Army Reserve as a part of the 364th Expeditionary Sustainment Command since November 2014. The unit's lineage runs back to 1944 when it was activated as HHD, 141st Quartermaster Battalion (Mobile) at Camp McCain, Miss. During this time the unit earned the Asiatic-Pacific Theater streamer. It moved to Fort Shafter, Hawaii in 1946 and was redesignated as HHD, 141st Transportation Corps Truck Battalion.

In 1948 the unit was given to the Organized Reserves and redesignated the 319th Transportation Service Group in Los Angeles. It was inactive from 1950-1965 when it was redesignated HHD, 319th Transportation Service Group in San Francisco. In 1968 the unit moved to Oakland, Calif. and became the 319th Transportation Brigade. It was inactive again from 1995-2024 when it was reactivated at Camp Parks, Dublin, Calif.

The brigade's mission is to provide Logistics Over the Shore (LOTS), terminal operations and theater level supply.

== Organization ==
The brigade is a subordinate unit of the 364th Expeditionary Sustainment Command. As of January 2026 the brigade consists of the following units:

- 319th Transportation Brigade, at Camp Parks (CA)
  - Headquarters and Headquarters Company, 319th Transportation Brigade, at Camp Parks (CA)
  - 385th Transportation Battalion (Terminal), in Tacoma (WA)
    - Headquarters and Headquarters Detachment, 385th Transportation Battalion (Terminal), in Tacoma (WA)
    - 332nd Transportation Detachment (Movement Control Team), in Tacoma (WA)
    - 477th Transportation Company (Inland Cargo Transfer Company — ICTC), in Marysville (WA)
    - 483rd Quartermaster Company (Field Service) (Modular), in Marysville (WA)
    - 804th Transportation Detachment (Movement Control Team), in Tacoma (WA)
    - 948th Transportation Company (Seaport Operations), in Marysville (WA)
    - 970th Transportation Detachment (Movement Control Team), in Eugene (OR)
  - 483rd Transportation Battalion (Terminal), in Vallejo (CA)
    - Headquarters and Headquarters Detachment, 483rd Transportation Battalion (Terminal), in Vallejo (CA)
    - 238th Transportation Company (Inland Cargo Transfer Company — ICTC), at Camp Parks (CA)
    - 711th Transportation Company (Seaport Operations), in Concord (CA)
