= General Caldwell =

General Caldwell may refer to:

- Frank Merrill Caldwell (1866–1937), U.S. Army brigadier general
- Frank Caldwell (British Army officer) (1921–2014), British Army major general
- John C. Caldwell (1833–1912), Union Army brevet major general
- William B. Caldwell III (1925–2013), U.S. Army lieutenant general
- William B. Caldwell IV (born 1954), U.S. Army lieutenant general, son of William B. Caldwell III

== See also ==
- Frederick Heath-Caldwell (1858–1945), British Army officer and RAF major general
- Attorney General Caldwell (disambiguation)
