= United States Army North =

Theater Army of the U.S. Army

Fifth Army Fifth United States Army United States Army North
- United States Army North shoulder sleeve insignia
- Active: 15 October 1921–16 July 1933; 1 December 1942–2 October 1945; 11 June 1946–15 July 2026
- Country: United States of America
- Branch: United States Army
- Type: Army Service Component Command
- Role: Theater Army
- Garrison/HQ: Fort Sam Houston, Texas
- Motto: "Strength of the Nation!"
- Engagements: World War II; Naples-Foggia; Anzio; Rome-Arno; North Apennines; Po Valley

Commanders
- Notable commanders: Mark W. Clark; Lucian Truscott; John P. Lucas; William B. Caldwell III; Guy C. Swan III; Thomas R. Turner II; William B. Caldwell IV; Laura J. Richardson

Insignia
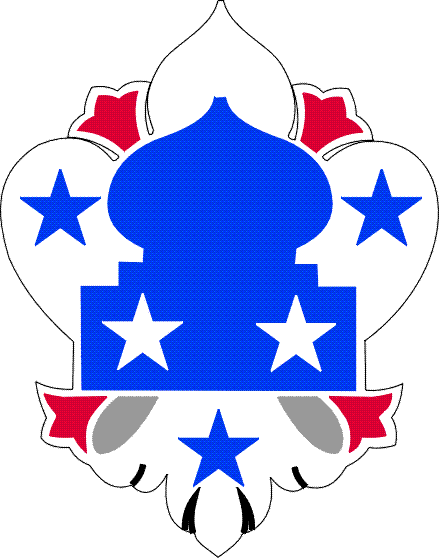
- Distinctive unit insignia

- Flag

- NATO Map Symbol

The United States Army North (ARNORTH) was a formation of the United States Army. In its final form, it was an Army Service Component Command (ASCC) subordinate to United States Northern Command (NORTHCOM), ARNORTH was the joint force land component of NORTHCOM. ARNORTH was responsible for homeland defense and defense support of civil authorities. ARNORTH was headquartered at Fort Sam Houston, Texas. Redesignated ARNORTH in 2004, it was first activated in early January 1943 as the United States Fifth Army, under the command of Lieutenant General Mark W. Clark.

ARNORTH was officially deactivated on 15 July 2026, becoming the third headquarters to transition into the United States Army Western Hemisphere Command.

== History ==
=== Interwar period ===
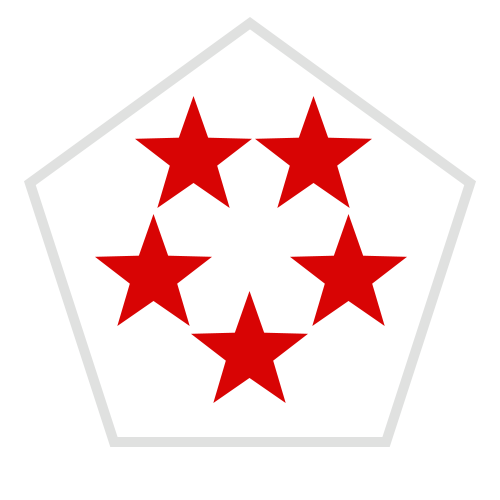
Fifth Army original SSI patch 1926-1933

The first iteration of the Fifth Army was authorized by the National Defense Act of 1920, and was originally to be composed of Organized Reserve units primarily from the Fourth, Fifth, and Sixth Corps Areas. The Headquarters and Headquarters Company were constituted in the Organized Reserve on 15 October 1921 and allotted to the Fifth Corps Area. Columbus, Ohio, was designated as headquarters upon organization, but the headquarters was never organized at that location. The Headquarters Company was initiated in 1922 in Columbus. Columbus remained the Fifth Army's designated headquarters location upon the event of its activation until 16 July 1932 when Indianapolis, Indiana, was designated as the army's new headquarters location. Due to the abandonment of the "Six Army" plan in favor of the "Four Army" plan, the Fifth Army was deleted from mobilization plans on 1 October 1933 and demobilized (disbanded). Its subordinate units were reassigned to the Second Army, the General Headquarters Reserve, or demobilized.

=== World War II ===
The United States Fifth Army was one of the principal formations of the U.S. Army in the Mediterranean during World War II, and was the first American field army ever to be activated outside of the United States. It was officially activated on 5 January 1943 at Oujda, French Morocco and made responsible for the defence of Algeria and Morocco. It was also given the responsibility for planning the American part of the invasion of mainland Italy, and therefore was not involved in the Allied invasion of Sicily (codenamed Operation Husky), where it was instead assigned the role of training combat troops destined for Sicily. The United States Fifth Army was initially commanded by Lieutenant General Mark Clark, who would lead the Fifth Army for nearly two years, and was to experience some of the toughest fighting of World War II, where it was engaged on the Italian Front, which was, in many ways, often more reminiscent of the trench warfare of the Western Front in World War I. Writing to Lieutenant General Jacob L. Devers (American deputy to Field Marshal Sir Henry Maitland Wilson, Mediterranean Theater commander) in late March 1944, Clark explained the difficulties of the fighting in Italy so far, which could be said of the whole campaign. They were, he claimed, "Terrain, weather, carefully prepared defensive positions in the mountains, determined and well-trained enemy troops, grossly inadequate means at our disposal while on the offensive, with approximately equal forces to the defender."

The Fifth Army first saw action during the Salerno landings (Operation Avalanche), the assault landings at Salerno, part of the Allied invasion of Italy, in September 1943. Due to the comparatively low numbers of American troops available in the Mediterranean Theater it was made up of one American and one British corps. They were the U.S. VI Corps, under Major General Ernest J. Dawley and the British X Corps, under Lieutenant-General Richard L. McCreery. At Salerno, VI Corps landed on the right flank, and X Corps on the left flank. Progress was initially slow, due in part to a lack of initiative by Dawley, the VI Corps commander, and due also to heavier than expected German resistance. However, heavy naval and air bombardment, along with a parachute drop by elements of the U.S. 82nd Airborne Division, had saved the forces from any danger of being driven back into the sea, combined with the approach of the British Eighth Army, under General Bernard Montgomery (the Eighth Army had landed further south in Operation Baytown, six days before Avalanche), the German 10th Army began to retreat. On 20 September, by which time the Fifth and Eighth Armies had linked up, Major General Dawley, VI Corps commander, was relieved of his command by Clark. Dawley was temporarily made deputy army commander, and was soon replaced in command of VI Corps by Major General John P. Lucas.

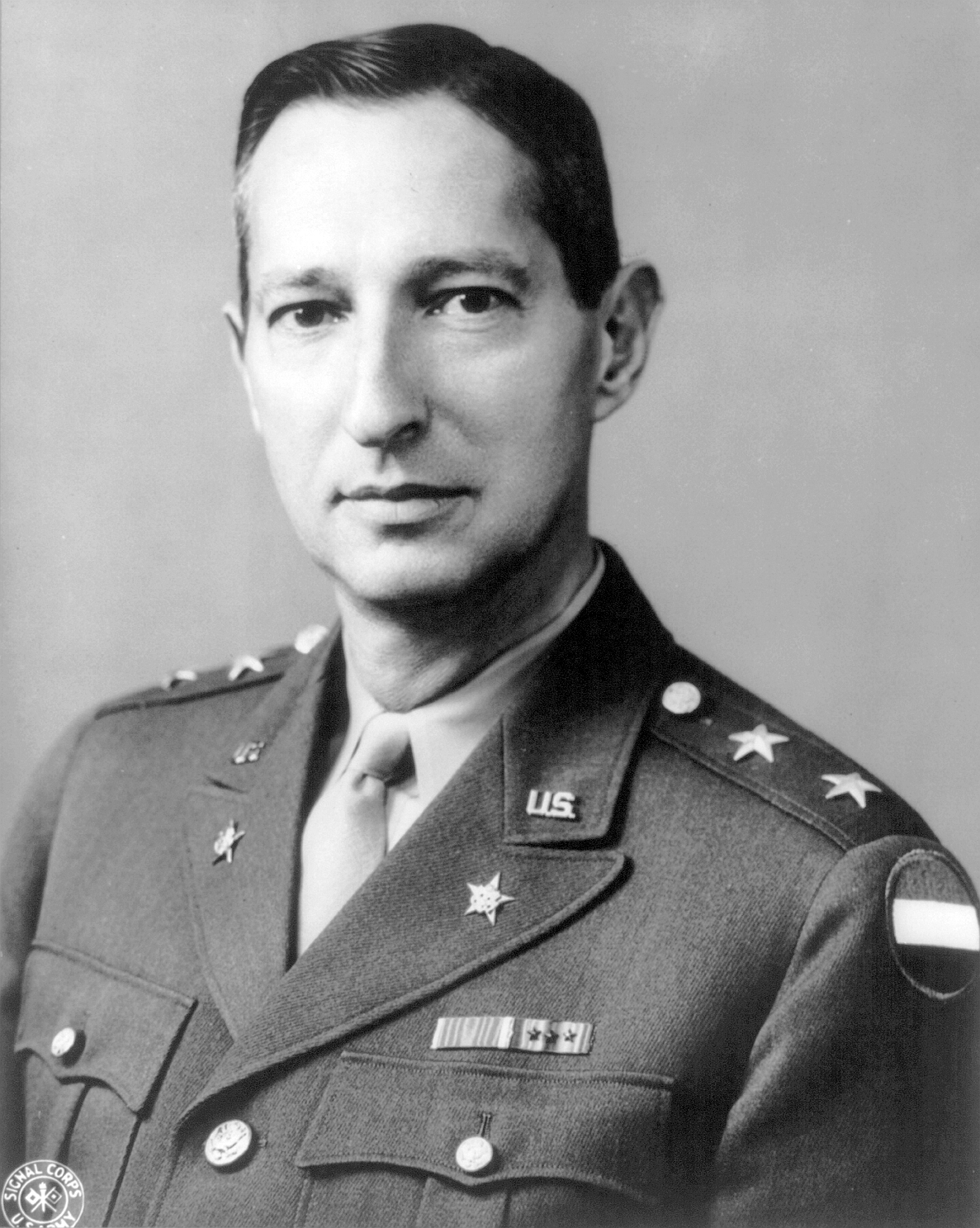
Mark W. Clark, pictured in 1942 as a major general, commanded Fifth Army throughout most of its World War II service.

Progress was then good for a couple of weeks and the Fifth Army crossed the Barbara Line and the Volturno Line until the Germans turned, stood and fought. They had established a position on the Winter Line (also known as the Gustav Line), which included the formidable defensive positions at San Pietro Infine in the Liri Valley and at Monte Cassino. By this point, Fifth Army had been reinforced by a second American corps, II Corps, commanded by Major General Geoffrey Keyes. By the end of November Clark's Fifth Army had almost doubled in size, with the addition of French General Alphonse Juin's French Expeditionary Corps, from 130,247 men to 243,827. With the failure of the first operations to capture Monte Cassino, an attempt was made to exploit the Allied preponderance in seapower before the coming invasion of Normandy robbed the Mediterranean of the naval forces necessary for an amphibious assault to seize Rome.

VI Corps, with its experience of amphibious landings at Salerno, was chosen for the assault and withdrawn from the line, replaced by the French Expeditionary Corps. They made a second attempt to capture Monte Cassino in conjunction with the amphibious assault by VI Corps, which again failed. VI Corps landed at Anzio, unopposed, on 22 January 1944 in Operation Shingle, and suffered many of the same problems as had been seen at Salerno. A perceived lack of initiative on the part of the commander, Major General Lucas, combined with worries about the Germans catching VI Corps off balance if it advanced too far inland resulted in the beachhead being bottled up. The Germans launched a series of attacks and counterattacks, with both sides sustaining heavy losses, and nearly breached the last beachhead defences before again being driven off by heavy naval and air support. The fault, however, "was not due to Lucas's incompetence; it was due instead to wishful thinking, faulty operational planning, and the German army's ability to respond forcefully and aggressively."

After the failure of Shingle, a large reorganization took place. Previously the Apennines had been the rough dividing line between Fifth and Eighth Armies. However, the dividing line was shifted westwards, to allow the concentration of both armies on the western side of Italy for maximum firepower to break through to Rome. British V Corps was left on the Adriatic coast to pin down any German units there. Fifth Army was relieved of responsibility for Cassino and the final phases of that battle saw Indian, New Zealand and finally Polish troops thrown against the fortress. Fifth Army also lost McCreery's British X Corps at this time, since it was felt that having exclusively American-organised units under Fifth Army and British-organised units under Eighth Army would ease logistics.

The breakthrough was achieved during the spring of 1944. Coordinated assaults by all the Allied forces, except V Corps, which was confined to a holding action, broke through. II Corps attacked along the coast, the French Expeditionary Corps, in a classic demonstration of mountain warfare, broke through on the right flank of Fifth Army, and VI Corps, now commanded by Major General Lucian K. Truscott, broke out of the Anzio beachhead. By early summer, Allied forces were well on their way to capturing Rome.

At this point, one of the more controversial incidents in the history of Fifth Army occurred. The strategic conception of General Sir Harold Alexander, commanding the Allied Armies in Italy (later redesigned 15th Army Group), was that the forces of VI Corps, coming out of Anzio, would trap the retreating German forces, and leave them to be annihilated by the advancing Fifth and Eighth Armies. However, in contravention of orders, Clark diverted units of VI Corps towards Rome, leaving a small blocking force to attempt to stop the Germans. It failed to do so, and the German forces were able to escape and reestablish a coherent line to the north of Rome. Clark claimed that there were significant German threats which necessitated the diversion, but many believe that he was primarily glory-seeking by being the first to liberate Rome.

On 6 June 1944, two days after Rome fell, Operation Overlord was launched. The strategic conception of Overlord called for a supporting operation to be mounted by invading southern France. In order to do so, forces would have to be withdrawn from the Allied Armies in Italy. In the end, VI Corps was withdrawn, forming the nucleus of the field forces of the U.S. Seventh Army for the invasion of the French Riviera, Operation Dragoon. The French Expeditionary Corps was also withdrawn, to allow its men to be used to for the French First Army, a follow-up formation for Dragoon. In slightly less than two months, the strength of the Fifth Army dropped from 248,989 down to 153,323. However, the 25,000-strong Brazilian Expeditionary Force, under Marshal J.B. Mascarenhas de Morais, as well as other divisions had arrived to align with U.S. IV Corps (which had arrived in June) under Major General Willis D. Crittenberger, so two corps were maintained within Fifth Army.

In the second half of 1944, the Allied forces fighting on the Italian Front within the U.S. Fifth Army and British Eighth Army resembled more a multi-national force being constituted by: Americans (including segregated African/and/Japanese-Americans), British, French, members of French and British colonies (New Zealanders, Canadians, Indians, Gurkhas, Black Africans, Moroccans, Algerians, Jews and Arabs from the British Mandate in Palestine, South Africans, Rhodesians), as well as Brazilians and exiled forces from Poland, Greece, former Czechoslovakia and anti-fascist Italians.

The Germans reestablished their line across Italy at the level of Pisa and Rimini. The Allied forces spent another winter, after fierce fighting in the summer and autumn in front of the Gothic Line, frustrated at their lack of ability to break through. This time Fifth Army, with British XIII Corps under command, led by Lieutenant-General Sidney Kirkman (whose relationship with Clark was apparently very stormy) was straddling the Apennines, with many of its units occupying high, exposed positions which were miserable to garrison. That winter also saw a significant change of command. Lieutenant General Clark moved to command 15th Army Group (previously styled the Allied Armies in Italy), and Lieutenant General Lucian K. Truscott was appointed to command Fifth Army in his place. Truscott would command the Army from 16 December 1944 until the war's end. Another change came in January 1945 when XIII Corps reverted to control of British Eighth Army, which had also seen many changes in composition and command, and was now commanded by Lieutenant-General Richard L. McCreery.

In the final offensive of the Italian campaign, launched in April 1945, against the German Army Group C, the Eighth Army initiated the main offensive on the Adriatic coast, and then the Fifth Army also broke through the German defenses around Bologna. The German units, in the main, were pinned against the Po River and destroyed, or at the very least deprived of their transport and heavy weapons, which effectively made many of them useless. II Corps units raced through Milan towards the French frontier and the great port of Genoa. IV Corps pushed due north through Verona, Vicenza and as far as Bolzano and to the Brenner Pass, where they linked up with elements of the U.S. Seventh Army, under Lieutenant General Alexander Patch.

Its role in Italy cost Fifth Army dearly. It suffered 109,642 casualties in 602 days of combat, of which 19,475 were killed in action. The Fifth Army headquarters returned to the United States in September 1945. Fifth Army was inactivated on 2 October 1945 at Camp Myles Standish, Massachusetts.

In the informal athletic competitions held between units of the European and North African theaters, the Fifth Army was among the most successful, winning titles in baseball, boxing, swimming and football during the 1944 season. The football championship was gained after a victory over 12th Air Force in the Spaghetti Bowl on 1 January 1945.

=== Order of battle, August 1944 ===
(Part of 15th Army Group)

- United States Fifth Army – (Lieutenant General Mark Clark)
  - U.S. II Corps – (Major General Geoffrey Keyes)
    - U.S. 34th Infantry Division – (Major General Charles L. Bolte)
    - U.S. 88th Infantry Division – (Major General John E. Sloan)
    - U.S. 91st Infantry Division – (Major General William G. Livesay)
  - U.S. IV Corps – (Major General Willis D. Crittenberger)
    - 6th South African Armoured Division – (Major-General Evered Poole)
    - U.S. 85th Infantry Division – (Major General John B. Coulter)
    - Brazilian Expeditionary Force – (Major General Mascarenhas de Morais)
    - U.S. 442nd Infantry Regiment
  - British XIII Corps – (Lieutenant-General Sidney Kirkman)
    - British 1st Infantry Division – (Major-General Charles Loewen)
    - British 6th Armoured Division – (Major-General Horatius Murray)
    - 8th Indian Infantry Division – (Major-General Dudley Russell)
  - Army Group Reserve
    - U.S. 1st Armored Division – (Major General Vernon Prichard)

=== Post war ===
The Army's next role was considerably less violent, and it was reactivated on 11 June 1946 at Chicago under the command of Major General John P. Lucas, who had commanded U.S. VI Corps in the early stages of the Battle of Anzio (Operation Shingle) during World War II before being relieved. The Army provided trained units and replacements to the U.S. forces in the Korean War from the summer of 1950 to late 1952. It was redesignated as the Fifth United States Army on 1 January 1957. Its postwar role was as a command and control headquarters for U.S. Army Reserve and National Guard units west of the Mississippi River, formally responsible for the training of many Army troops and also the ground defense of part of the continental United States. In June 1971, the Fifth Army moved to its current base at Fort Sam Houston, Texas.

=== Redesignation in 2004 ===
In 2004, Fifth Army transferred its Reserve preparation obligations to First Army, and became responsible for homeland defense and Defense Support of Civil Authorities (DSCA) as United States Army North, the Army Service Component Command of United States Northern Command. Joint Task Force-Civil Support, a subordinate command, is designated as the Department of Defense (DoD) command element for Department of Defense assistance to the overall federal response to a state governments request for assistance in the event of a catastrophic chemical, biological, nuclear or high yield explosive CBRNE emergency. The command also has a subordinate Contingency Command Post (CCP), known as Task Force-51, which is responsible for responding to all hazards incidents that require DOD assistance. TF-51 can be employed as an all-hazards task force or a Joint Task Force (JTF) with joint augmentation.

In 2020, ARNORTH mitigated the COVID-19 pandemic by setting up hospitals using 15 Urban Augmentation Medical Task Forces.

In 2025, Secretary of the Army Dan Driscoll announced U.S. Army North would merge with United States Army South to create the US Army Western Hemisphere Command as a unified command under Forces Command and that U.S. Army North would be deactivated 15 October 2026.

On 15 July 2026, ARNORTH was officially deactivated and its colors were cased during a ceremony at Fort Sam Houston.

== Units in 2021 ==
Units of US Army North as of 21 December 2021 included:

- Army Headquarters & Headquarters Battalion, at Fort Sam Houston, Texas
  - 323rd Army Band "Fort Sam's Own"
- Joint Task Force North (JTF-N), at Fort Bliss, Texas
- Defence Coordinating Elements (DCE)
- Task Force 46 (Michigan Army National Guard), in Lansing, Michigan – CBRN, part of 46th Military Police Command
- Joint Task Force 51
- Task Force 76 (Army Reserve), in Salt Lake City, Utah – CBRN, part of 76th Operational Response Command
- Joint Task Force – Civil Support, at Joint Base Langley–Eustis, Virginia
- Civil Support Training Activity (CSTA)
- 505th Military Intelligence Brigade (Theater) (Army Reserve)
  - Headquarters & Headquarters Company, at Fort Sam Houston, Texas
  - 383rd Military Intelligence Battalion, HQ in Belton, Missouri
  - 549th Military Intelligence Battalion, at Camp Bullis, Texas
- 263rd Army Air and Missile Defense Command (South Carolina Army National Guard)
  - Command Headquarters & Headquarters Battery, in Anderson, South Carolina
  - 2nd Battalion, 263rd Air Defence Artillery Regiment, in Anderson, South Carolina (4 x batteries in Seneca, Easley, and Clemson)
- 3rd Sustainment Command (Expeditionary) – part of XVIII Airborne Corps
  - Command Special Troops Battalion, at Fort Bragg, North Carolina
  - 330th Movement Control Battalion
  - 264th Combat Sustainment Support Battalion
- 4th Infantry Division Sustainment Brigade – part of 4th Infantry Division
  - 4th Special Troops Battalion, at Fort Carson, Colorado
  - 68th Combat Sustainment Support Battalion
- 167th Theater Sustainment Command (Alabama Army National Guard)
  - Command Special Troops Battalion, at Fort McClellan, Alabama
  - 1169th Contingency Contracting Battalion, in Huntsville, Alabama
  - 135th Sustainment Command (Expeditionary)
    - Command Headquarters, in Birmingham, Alabama
    - 731st Combat Sustainment Support Battalion, in Tallassee, Alabama
    - 1103rd Combat Sustainment Support Battalion, in Eufaula, Alabama
    - 1200th Combat Sustainment Support Battalion, in Ashland, Alabama
    - 440th Transportation Detachment, in Selma, Alabama
  - 279th Army Field Support Brigade, HQ in Huntsville, Alabama
    - 1169th Contracting Battalion, at Fort Jackson, South Carolina – disbanded in 2020
  - 111th Ordnance Group
    - Group Headquarters & Headquarters Detachment, in Opelika, Alabama
    - 441st Ordnance Battalion, in Huntsville, Alabama

== Commanding Officers ==
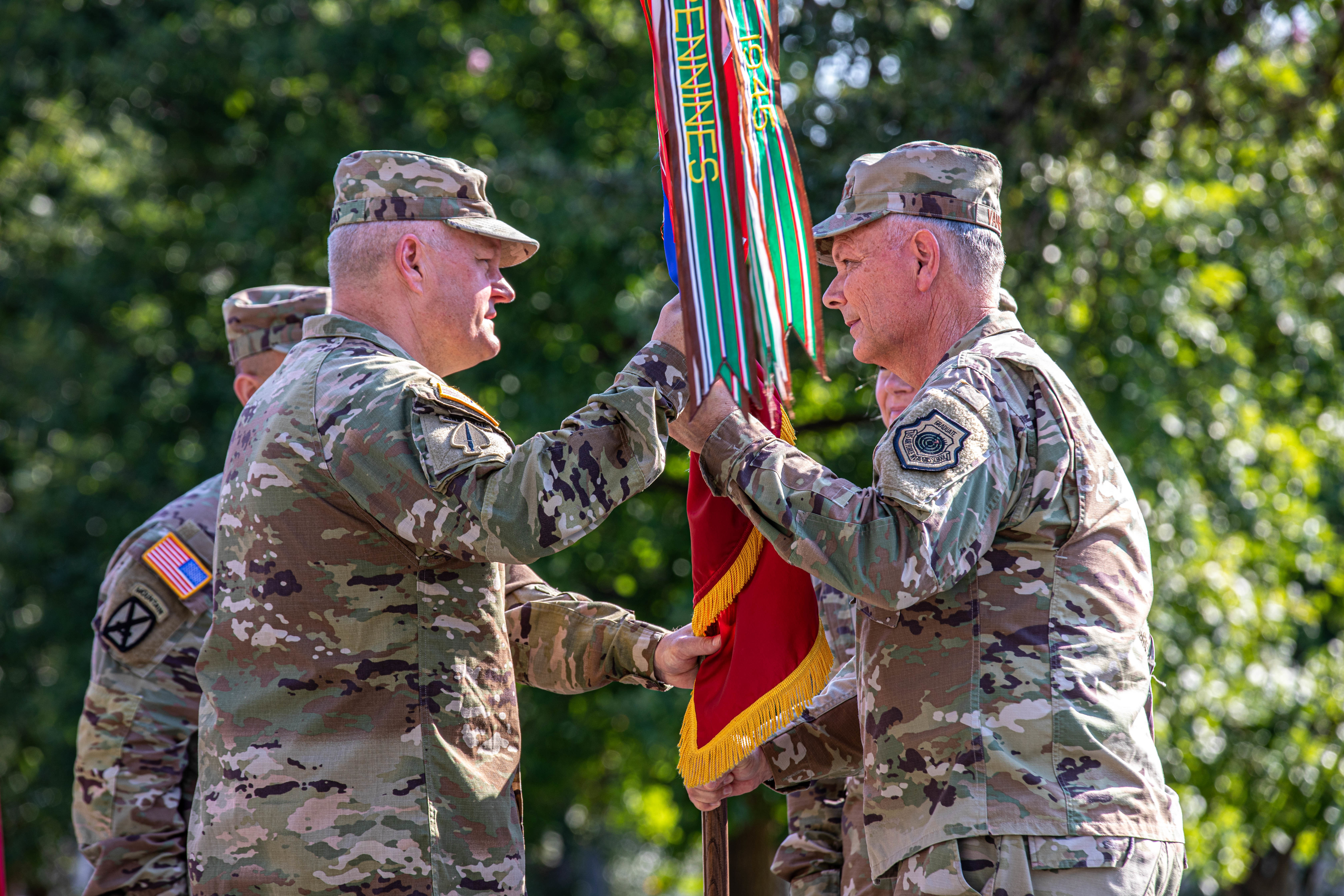
Gen. Glen D. VanHerck, right, Commander, North American Aerospace Defense Command and United States Northern Command, passes the U.S. Army North colors to Lt. Gen. John R. Evans Jr., during the U.S. Army North change of command ceremony at Joint Base San Antonio-Fort Sam Houston, September 9, 2021.

Fully qualified officers of the Regular Army, Army National Guard and Army Reserve are eligible and considered by the Secretary of Defense and Congress when selecting the United States Army North commanding general.

- LTG Mark W. Clark (January 1943 – December 1944)
- LTG Lucian K. Truscott (December 1944 – October 1945)
- Inactive (October 1945 – June 1946)
- LTG Walton Walker (June 1946 – October 1948)
- LTG Stephen J. Chamberlin (October 1948 – December 1951)
- MG Albert C. Smith (acting, December 1951 - July 1952)
- LTG William B. Kean (July 1952 - September 1954)
- LTG Hobart R. Gay (October 1954 - August 1955)
- MG Philip De Witt Ginder (acting, August 1955 - October 1955)
- LTG William Howard Arnold (November 1955 - December 1960)
- LTG Emerson LeRoy Cummings (January 1961 - March 1962)
- MG Lloyd R. Moses (acting, April 1962 - May 1962)
- LTG John K. Waters (May 1962 - January 1963)
- LTG Charles G. Dodge (February 1963 - March 1966)
- MG Joseph E. Bastion Jr. (acting, April 1966)
- LTG John H. Michaelis (April 1966 - January 1969)
- LTG Vernon P. Mock (January 1969 - June 1971)
- LTG George V. Underwood Jr. (July 1971 - September 1971)
- LTG Patrick F. Cassidy (September 1971 - September 1973)
- LTG George P. Seneff Jr. (October 1973 - June 1973)
- GEN John J. Hennessey (July 1973 - November 1974)
- MG Donald V. Rattan (acting, November 1974 - March 1975)
- LTG Allen M. Burdett Jr. (March 1975 - June 1978)
- LTG William B. Caldwell III (July 1978 - August 1980)
- LTG John R. McGiffert II (August 1980 - January 1983)
- LTG Edward A. Partain (January 1983 - January 1985)
- LTG Louis C. Menetrey (January 1985 - May 1987)
- LTG William H. Schneider (May 1987 - September 1989)
- LTG George R. Stotser (September 1989 - July 1991)
- MG Donald E. Eckelbarger (acting, July 1991 - September 1991)
- BG F.J. Walters (acting, September 1991 - October 1991)
- MG Bruce W. Moore (acting, October 1991 - November 1991)
- LTG Neal T. Jaco (November 1991 - February 1994)
- LTG Marc A. Cisneros (February 1994 - July 1996)
- LTG Joseph W. Kinzer (July 1996 - August 1998)
- LTG Robert F. Foley (August 1998 - August 2000)
- LTG Freddy E. McFarren (August 2000 - December 2003)
- LTG Robert T. Clark (December 2003 - December 2006)
- LTG Thomas R. Turner II (December 2006 - December 2009)
- LTG Guy C. Swan III (December 2009 - January 2012)
- LTG William B. Caldwell IV (January 2012 - September 2013)
- LTG Perry L. Wiggins (September 2013 - August 2016)
- LTG Jeffrey S. Buchanan (August 2016 - July 2019)
- LTG Laura J. Richardson (July 2019 – September 2021)
- LTG John R. Evans Jr. (September 2021 – August 2024)
- MG Scott M. Sherman (acting, August 2024 – December 2024)
- LTG Allan M. Pepin (December 2024 – October 2026)

== See also ==
- National Response Framework
- NSPD-51
- REX-84

== Bibliography ==
- Ready, J. Lee. Forgotten Allies: The European Theatre, Volume I. McFarland & Company, 1985. ISBN 978-0-89950-129-1.
- Ready, J. Lee. Forgotten Allies: The Military Contribution of the Colonies, Exiled Governments and Lesser Powers to the Allied Victory in World War II. McFarland & Company, 1985. ISBN 978-0-89950-117-8.
- Jon B. Mikolashek. General Mark Clark: Commander of America's Fifth Army in World War II and Liberator of Rome.
