= 135th Expeditionary Sustainment Command =

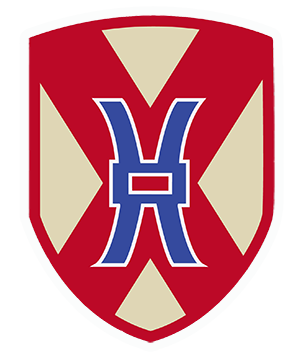
- Shoulder Sleeve Insignia
- Country: United States
- Allegiance: Alabama Army National Guard
- Branch: United States Army National Guard
- Role: Sustainment Command (Expeditionary)
- Part of: 1st Theater Sustainment Command
- Reserve Center: Birmingham, Alabama
- Motto: Sustaining Freedom
- Decorations: Army Meritorious Unit Commendation
- Battle honours: Operation Enduring Freedom

Commanders
- Current commander: MG Jerry Martin

Insignia
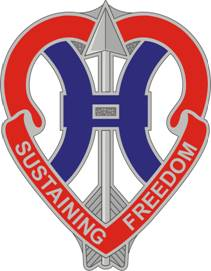
- Distinctive Unit Insignia

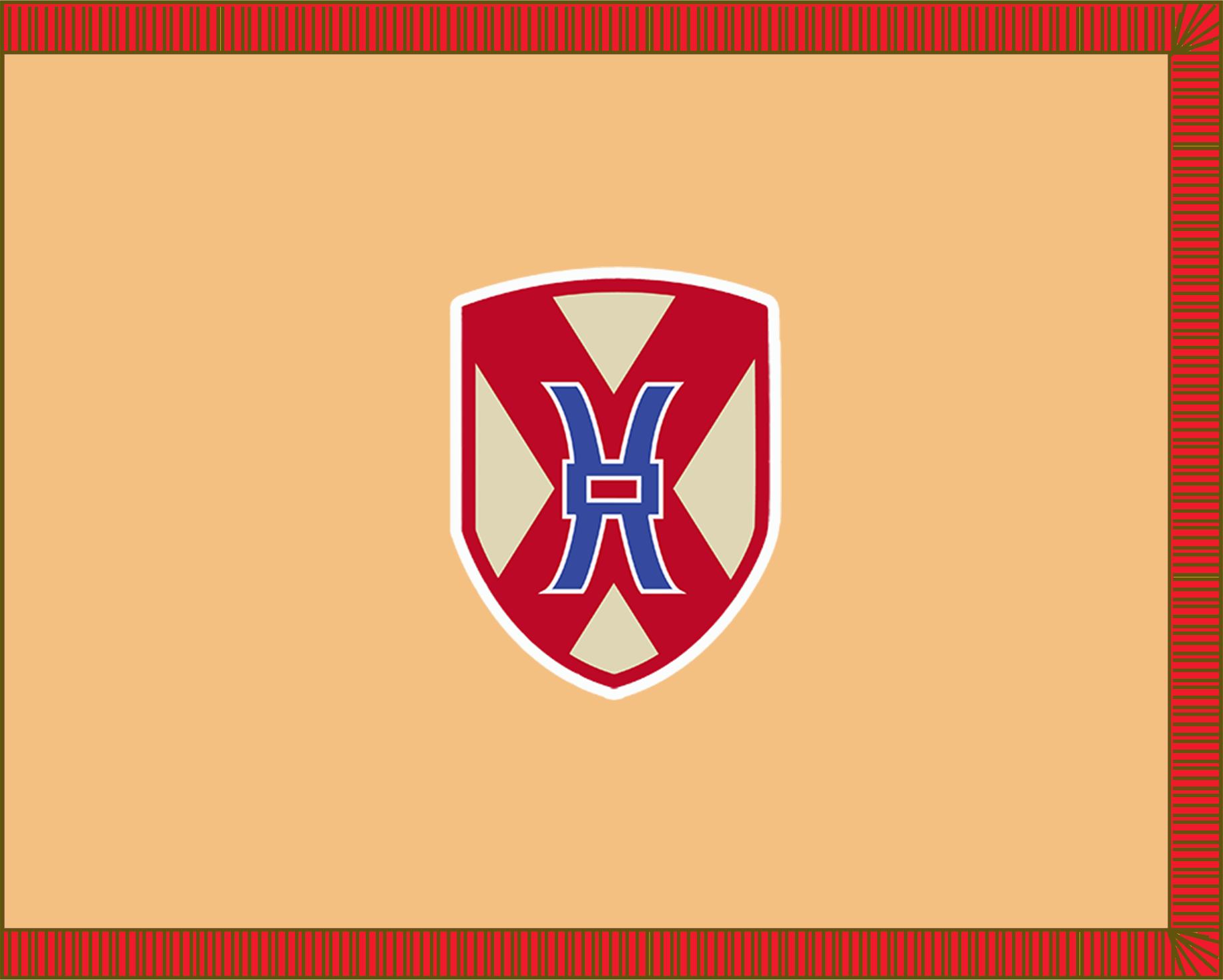
- 135th Sustainment Command Flag

The 135th Expeditionary Sustainment Command (135 ESC) is an independent major command (MACOM) of the Alabama Army National Guard, and until 2014 was a subordinate unit of the 167th Theater Sustainment Command. It is one of two Expeditionary Sustainment Commands assigned to the National Guard, the other unit is the 184th Sustainment Command assigned to the Mississippi Army National Guard.

== Mission ==
The mission of the 135th Expeditionary Sustainment Command is to provide Command and Control of all assigned, attached, and operationally controlled units. The 135th ESC provides sustainment planning, guidance, and support to forces in an area of operation.

== Subordinate Units ==
- 731st Combat Sustainment Support Battalion (731st CSSB), Tallassee, AL

== Operation Enduring Freedom ==
The 135th ESC mobilized for Operation Enduring Freedom from its home station in Birmingham, Alabama on 30 October 2009. Their mission in Afghanistan was to coordinate supply and logistics in the Afghan theater. While in Afghanistan the unit will supply more than 200 forward operating bases, supply more than 1 million cases of bottled water per month and food for more than 210,00 meals per day. The command conducted pre-mobilization training at Ft. Hood, TX, in November and December 2009. The 135th took command of Joint Sustainment Command - Afghanistan from the U.S. Army Reserve 143rd ESC in early December 2009. The 135th ESC turned over control of Joint Sustainment Command - Afghanistan to the 184th ESC on 17 October 2010.
