= William B. Caldwell IV =

US Army general (born 1954)

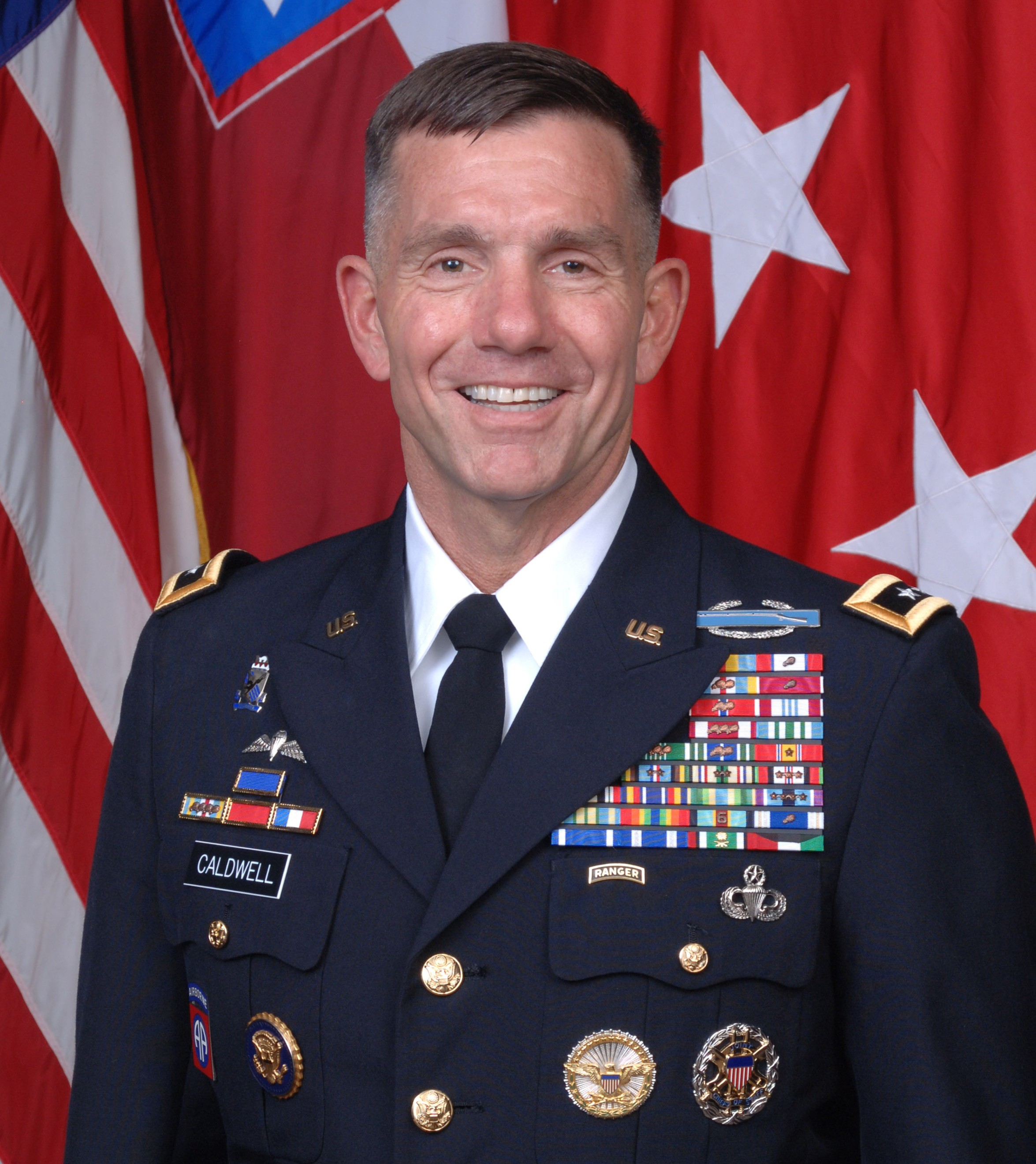
- Caldwell
- Born: January 24, 1954 (age 72); Columbus, Georgia, U.S.
- Relatives: Lt. Gen. William B. Caldwell III (father)
- Military career
- Allegiance: United States
- Branch: United States Army
- Service years: 1976–2013
- Rank: Lieutenant General
- Nickname: "Bill"
- Commands: United States Army North; Combined Security Transition Command – Afghanistan; NATO Training Mission – Afghanistan; Fort Leavenworth; United States Army Combined Arms Center; 82nd Airborne Division; 1st Brigade, 10th Mountain Division (Light); 4th Battalion, 27th Infantry Regiment
- Conflicts: Operation Just Cause; Somali Civil War; Gulf War; Iraq War; War in Afghanistan
- Awards: Defense Distinguished Service Medal; Homeland Security Distinguished Service Medal; Army Distinguished Service Medal (2); Defense Superior Service Medal (3); Legion of Merit (2); Bronze Star Medal (3)
- Other work: Former President of Georgia Military College

William B. Caldwell IV (born January 24, 1954) is an American retired lieutenant general and President Emeritus of Georgia Military College. Caldwell's final military assignment was as Commanding General of United States Army North, also known as the Fifth Army.

== Early life and education ==
Originally from Columbus, Georgia, Caldwell's family moved frequently as his father, William B. Caldwell, III was a serving officer in the US Army. His father retired as a Lieutenant General while serving as the Commander of Fifth Army, and he himself would eventually retire as a Lieutenant General while also serving as commander of Fifth US Army. During Caldwell's early childhood, his father was stationed at the United States Military Academy. Caldwell attended the SHAPE American High School at SHAPE, Belgium followed by Hargrave Military Academy, a private military boarding school in Chatham, Virginia. From there, he was accepted to the United States Military Academy at West Point, New York. He continued his education with a master's degree in systems technology from the Naval Postgraduate School and then a master of military arts and sciences from the School of Advanced Military Studies which is part of the U.S. Army Command and General Staff College. Caldwell has also attended the John F. Kennedy School of Government and Harvard University as a Senior Service College Fellow.

== Military career ==
After being commissioned as an Infantry officer of the United States Army in 1976, he served in the 1st Battalion, 508th Airborne Infantry Regiment, at Fort Bragg, North Carolina, from 1977 to 1979. Caldwell was a company commander there in 1979. He then served as aide-de-camp to the commanding general of the 82nd Airborne Division from 1980 to 1981, before attending the Armor School. From 1982 to 1983, Caldwell was a company commander in the 1st Battalion, 46th Infantry Regiment, in West Germany. He was the battalion S-4 officer in 1984. After attending the Naval Postgraduate School, the Army Command and General Staff College, and the School of Advanced Military Studies, in 1988 he began serving as a G-3 plans officer of the 82nd Airborne Division. He was in that role until 1989, then became the executive officer of 1st Battalion, 505th Parachute Infantry Regiment, in 1990.

Caldwell served as the S-3 officer of the 3rd Brigade Combat Team, 82nd Airborne Division, in 1991. He was a White House Fellow in 1992, then commanded the 4th Battalion, 27th Infantry Regiment, 25th Infantry Division, from 1993 to 1994. Following his battalion command in the 27th Infantry, Caldwell was sent to Haiti in 1995 to work as a political-military liaison officer with the Multinational Force and United Nations Mission in Haiti during Operation Uphold Democracy. He was a national security fellow at Harvard University from 1995 to 1996, and then commanded the 1st Brigade, 10th Mountain Division, at Fort Drum from 1996 to 1998. From 1998 to 1999, Caldwell worked in the Office of the Director for Strategic Plans and Policy (J5) on the Joint Chiefs of Staff at the Pentagon, and later served as the executive assistant to the Chairman of the Joint Chiefs of Staff, from 1999 to 2001.

Caldwell was the assistant deputy commander (operations) of the 25th Infantry Division in 2001, before becoming the deputy director for operations, United States Pacific Command, Hawaii, from 2001 to 2002. He was in the latter at the time of the 9/11 attacks, when the command's focus shifted from regional war plans to the Global War on Terrorism.

In July 2002 Caldwell was assigned as senior military assistant to the deputy secretary of defense, Paul Wolfowitz. In this position he served his boss during the preparation, execution, and follow on for the Iraq War's Operation Iraqi Freedom and other aspects of the Global War on Terrorism.

From May 2004 until June 2006 Caldwell served as the Commanding General of the 82nd Airborne Division. As the division commander, Caldwell oversaw deployments by the units under his command to both Afghanistan and Iraq, as well as disaster-relief efforts following Hurricane Katrina in New Orleans.

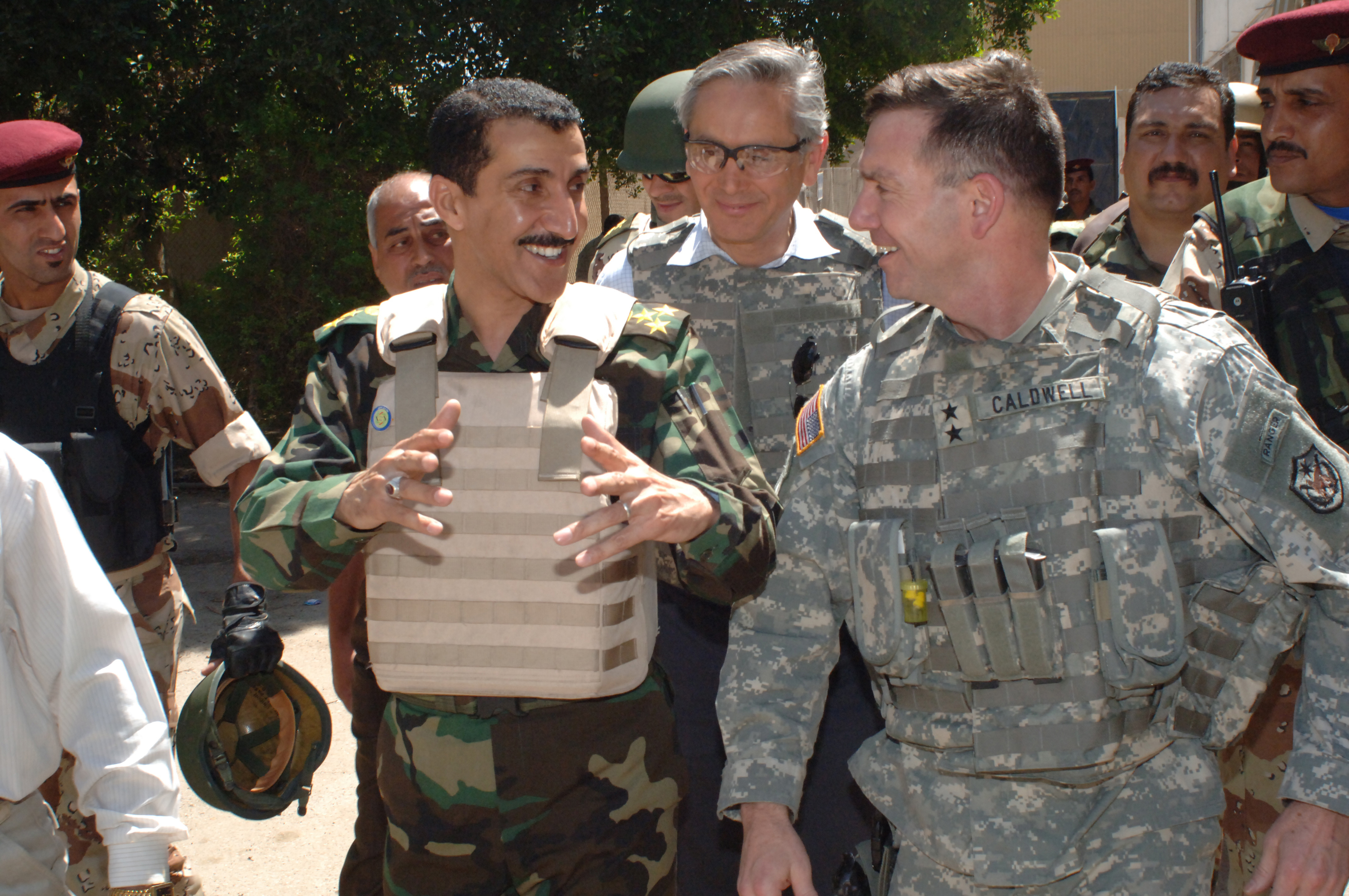
Caldwell walks in Eastern Baghdad in April 2007.

Following his command of the 82nd, Caldwell was assigned as Deputy Chief of Staff for Strategic Effects and spokesperson for the Multi-National Force – Iraq, a position he held for 13 months.

=== United States Army Combined Arms Center ===
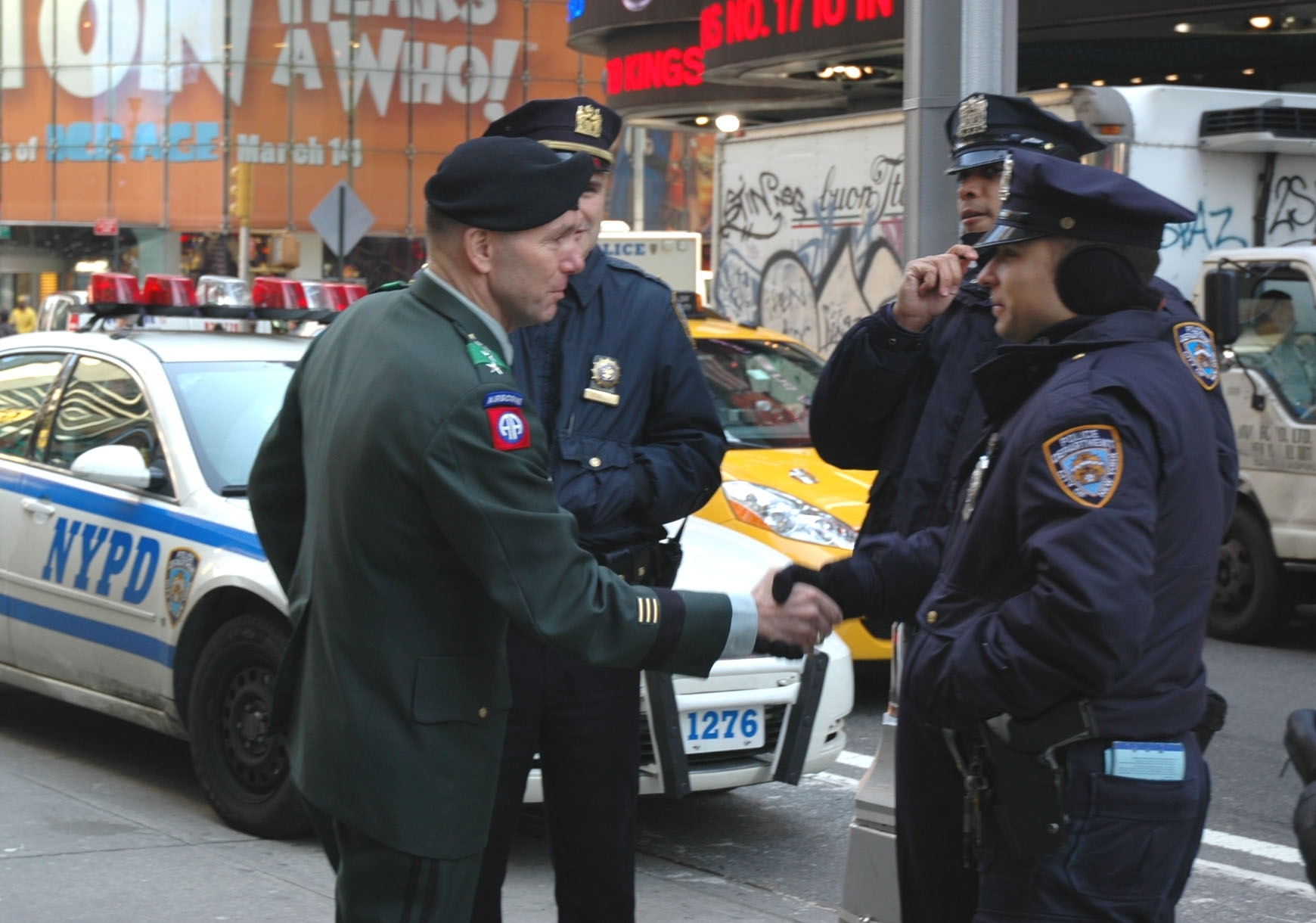
New York City policemen are greeted by Caldwell as he visits the Times Square Military Recruiting Station on March 10, 2008.

Caldwell was promoted to the rank of lieutenant general in June 2007 and served as the Commanding General of the Combined Arms Center at Fort Leavenworth, Kansas. As the Commanding General for the Combined Arms Center, he has responsibility for the Command and General Staff College and 17 other schools, centers, and training programs throughout the United States.

=== NATO Training Mission-Afghanistan/Combined Security Transition Command-Afghanistan ===
Caldwell assumed command of the NATO Training Mission-Afghanistan (NTM-A)/Combined Security Transition Command-Afghanistan (CSTC-A) on November 21, 2009. Prior to the activation of NTM-A at that time, CSTC-A was a two-star command headed by then Major General Richard Formica. Elevating the Afghan training mission to a three-star command reflected the increased priority placed on training the Afghan National Security Force (ANSF) as part of President Barack Obama's Afghan "Surge." Caldwell's efforts in Afghanistan received praise from figures in the military and government, including Senator Carl Levin, United States Secretary of Defense Robert Gates, and Admiral Mike Mullen. During this assignment Caldwell was investigated after a subordinate claimed Caldwell directed him to use psychological operations in order to influence U.S. political leaders to support the military effort in Afghanistan. Doing so would be a violation of the Smith–Mundt Act. However, an investigation cleared Caldwell of wrongdoing.

=== Dawood Military Hospital ===
Three U.S. military officers testified that Caldwell tried to prevent the U.S. Department of Defense from investigating sub-standard conditions at an American-funded Afghan military hospital in Kabul. Caldwell's reasoning, according to Colonel Mark Fassl, was that there was "an election coming." However, Kenneth Moorefield, Deputy Inspector General for Special Plans and Operations, dismissed these allegations, claiming that there as no "attempt...to delay our investigation...or turn it off."

The Department of Defense Office of Inspector General (DoDIG) conducted an investigation into the allegations and determined that Caldwell and his deputy Major General Gary S. Patton sought in 2011 to restrict contact with a team of investigators probing allegations of corruption and sub-standard patient care at Dawood National Military Hospital. The Inspector General recommended that the Secretary of the Army take appropriate action against Caldwell and his immediate subordinate, Major General Patton. An Army spokesman stated that, following the investigation, Caldwell "requested that he be retired, knowing that these substantiated allegations would directly prevent any future promotion or assignment to a position of importance and responsibility."

=== United States Army North (Fifth Army) ===
Caldwell's final military command was United States Army North, also known as the Fifth Army, which was also his father's final military assignment. Caldwell turned over command of U.S. Army North to Lieutenant General Perry L. Wiggins on September 4, 2013.

== Later work ==
General Caldwell has served as the President of Georgia Military College since November 1, 2013, during which time several new campuses were opened, growing the GMC footprint in Georgia to include the Main Campus in Milledgeville, 11 community college campuses, and the Global Online Leadership College.

Georgia Military College Preparatory School (K-12 grades) has also experienced growth under General Caldwell's leadership, having added third grade in 2019, and grades K-2 in 2021. With the addition of the elementary grades, GMC Prep School also expanded its campus footprint with the historic preservation and restoration of Jenkins Hall, and now Wilder Hall, and new construction of the Prep School Annex. These buildings now house grades K- 5 in the Prep School.

== Dates of rank ==
Promotions
Rank	Date
Second lieutenant	1976
First lieutenant	1978
Captain	1980
Major	1986
Lieutenant colonel	1992
Colonel	1996
Brigadier general	2001
Major general	2004
Lieutenant general	2007

== Awards and decorations ==
U.S. military decorations
Defense Distinguished Service Medal
Homeland Security Distinguished Service Medal
Army Distinguished Service Medal (with 1 bronze Oak Leaf Cluster)
Defense Superior Service Medal (with 2 Oak Leaf Clusters)
Legion of Merit (with 1 Oak Leaf Cluster)
Bronze Star Medal (with 2 Oak Leaf Clusters)
Defense Meritorious Service Medal (with 1 Oak Leaf Cluster)
Meritorious Service Medal (with 3 Oak Leaf Clusters)
Joint Service Commendation Medal
Army Commendation Medal (with 3 Oak Leaf Clusters)
Army Achievement Medal (with 2 Oak Leaf Clusters)
Unit awards
Presidential Unit Citation
Joint Meritorious Unit Award (with 4 Oak Leaf Clusters)
Army Meritorious Unit Commendation
Philippine Presidential Unit Citation
U.S. service (campaign) medals and service and training ribbons
National Defense Service Medal (with Bronze Service Star)
Armed Forces Expeditionary Medal (with 2 Bronze Service Stars)
Southwest Asia Service Medal (with 2 Bronze Service Stars)
Afghanistan Campaign Medal (with 3 Bronze Service Stars)
Iraq Campaign Medal (with 2 Bronze Service Stars)
Global War on Terrorism Service Medal
Armed Forces Service Medal
Humanitarian Service Medal (with 4 Bronze Service Stars)
Military Outstanding Volunteer Service Medal
Army Service Ribbon
Army Overseas Service Ribbon (with bronze award numeral 6)
Non-U.S. service medals
NATO Meritorious Service Medal (with 1 service star)
NATO Medal for the former Yugoslavia with service star
EUPOL Afghanistan Medal
Polish Armed Forces Gold Medal
Ghazi Mir Bacha Khan Medal (Afghanistan)
Afghanistan National Police Symbol of Honor Medal
Kuwait Liberation Medal (Saudi Arabia)
Kuwait Liberation Medal (Kuwait)
Army National Guard awards
Louisiana Cross of Merit

Badges, patches and tabs
Combat Infantryman Badge
Combat Action Badge
Expert Infantryman Badge
Ranger Tab
Master Parachutist Badge
Presidential Service Identification Badge
Office of the Secretary of Defense Identification Badge
Joint Chiefs of Staff Identification Badge
82nd Airborne Division Combat Service Identification Badge
505th Infantry Regiment Distinctive Unit Insignia
8 Overseas Service Bars
German Armed Forces Badge for Military Proficiency in bronze
German Parachutist badge in bronze
Canadian Jump Wings (red maple leaf)
British Parachutist Badge
Irish Parachutist Badge in silver

== See also ==
- International Security Assistance Force
- Combined Security Transition Command – Afghanistan
- 2009 congressional delegation to Afghanistan
