= 168th Engineer Brigade =

- 168th Engineer Brigade Shoulder Sleeve Insignia
- Active: 1951 – Present
- Country: United States
- Allegiance: Mississippi Army National Guard
- Branch: United States Army National Guard
- Role: Combat Engineers
- Size: Brigade
- Part of: 184th Sustainment Command
- HQ: Vicksburg, Mississippi
- Motto: Monuments To Progress
- Engagements: Iraq War; War in Afghanistan
- Decorations: Headquarters and Headquarters Company: Presidential Unit Citation; Meritorious Unit Commendation (2)

Commanders
- Current commander: Colonel Thomas Howell

Insignia
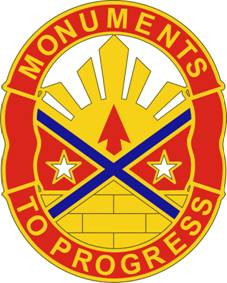
- Distinctive unit insignia

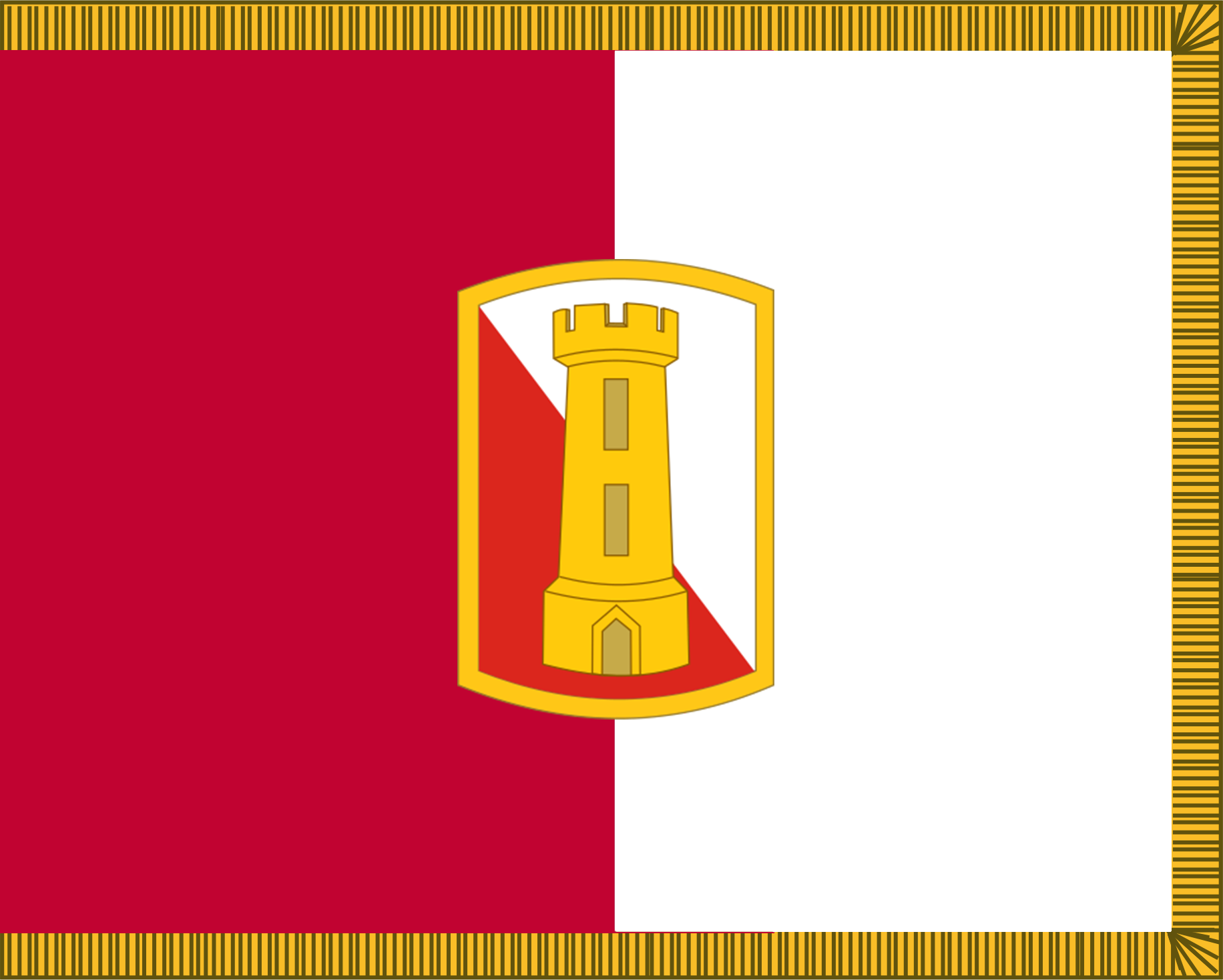
- 168th Engineer Brigade Flag

The 168th Engineer Brigade is a Combat Engineer brigade of the United States Army based in Vicksburg, Mississippi. It is a part of the Mississippi Army National Guard and was redesignated from the 168th Engineer Group in 2008.

Under the administrative and training supervision of the 184th Sustainment Command, the brigade is in turn responsible for the peacetime administration and training of two subordinate battalions spread through Mississippi: the 223rd Engineer Battalion and the 890th Engineer Battalion.

== History ==
The lineage of the 168th Engineer Brigade headquarters began with the organization and Federal recognition of the Vicksburg-based headquarters battery of the nondivisional 204th Antiaircraft Artillery Automatic Weapons Battalion on 30 April 1951. The 204th was one of 20 new nondivisional units allotted to the Mississippi Army National Guard several weeks earlier on 16 March. The 168th Engineer Combat Group headquarters was soon allotted to the Mississippi Army National Guard to control its nondivisional engineer units. As a result, the battery was converted into the Headquarters and Headquarters Company of the 168th Engineer Combat Group on 9 October. Battery C of the 204th at Laurel was reorganized as the new headquarters battery.

The group was redesignated as 168th Engineer Group on 1 February 1953. By mid-1953, it controlled the 114th Engineer Battalion, and the separate 138th, 139th, 146th, 156th, and 157th Engineer Companies. The group conducted two weeks of summer training that year at Fort McClellan with the other nondivisional Mississippi Army National Guard units. On 15 June 1954 the Vicksburg-based Headquarters and Service Company and Medical Detachment of the 106th Engineer Battalion of the 31st Infantry Division were consolidated into the 168th Engineer Group headquarters when the former returned to state control following the Korean War mobilization of the division. The 106th Engineer Battalion headquarters had been organized at Vicksburg in 1934 as Company B, 106th Engineers and served with the 31st Division in World War II as Company B of the 106th Engineer Combat Battalion.

The 85-strong group headquarters departed for Fort Stewart in February 2003 prior to a deployment to Iraq. The unit spent eleven months in Iraq stationed near Balad Air Base providing command and control to engineer units, returning to Vicksburg in April 2004. It was awarded a Meritorious Unit Commendation for its performance between 10 February 2003 and 9 February 2004 while under control of the 130th Engineer Brigade. The 168th Engineer Group headquarters was planned to be eliminated during the modular reorganization but instead was redesignated as the 168th Engineer Brigade headquarters in a 13 January 2008 ceremony due to its readiness and performance. This resulted in an increase of the headquarters authorized strength from 83 to 125 personnel. Notified of a deployment to Afghanistan, the roughly 139-strong brigade headquarters departed for pre-deployment training at Camp Shelby in December of that year. The brigade headquarters coordinated engineer operations in Paktika and Parwan Provinces while in-country between 1 March and 19 November 2009, and was awarded a Meritorious Unit Commendation for its performance.

== Commanders ==
The following officers have commanded the group and brigade:

- Brigadier General Johnny M. Sellers (2010–2012)
- Colonel Joe D. Hargett (October 2012–October 2014)
- Colonel Trent Kelly (October 2014–August 2016)
- Colonel Ilos Ducksworth (2016–2018)
- Colonel Kelvin Nichols (2018–2020)
- Colonel Kendrick Cager (2020–2024)
- Colonel Rob Enochs (2024)

== Honors ==
The 168th Engineer Brigade headquarters is entitled to the following campaign participation credit:

- World War II (as Company B, 106th Engineer Combat Battalion): New Guinea (with arrowhead), Southern Philippines
- Iraq
- Afghanistan

The 168th Engineer Brigade headquarters is entitled to the following decorations:

- Presidential Unit Citation (106th Engineer Combat Battalion cited)
- Meritorious Unit Commendation, streamer embroidered "Southwest Asia 2003-2004"
- Meritorious Unit Commendation, streamer embroidered "Afghanistan 2009"
