= Thomas R. Turner II =

United States Army general (1952-2024)

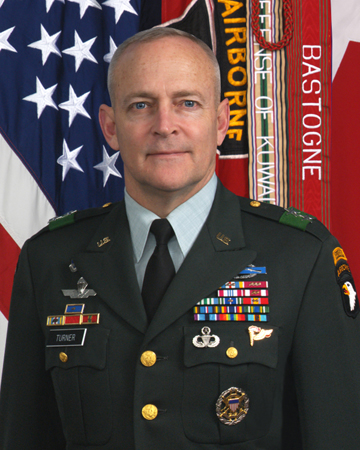
- Thomas R. Turner II, while in command of the 101st Airborne Division.
- Born: August 24, 1952; Ridley Park, Pennsylvania, U.S.
- Died: September 27, 2024 (aged 72); Alexandria, Virginia, U.S.
- Burial place: Arlington National Cemetery
- Military career
- Allegiance: United States
- Branch: United States Army
- Service years: 1974–2010
- Rank: Lieutenant General
- Commands: United States Army North; 101st Airborne Division; U.S. Army Southern European Task Force (Airborne)
- Conflicts: Operation Just Cause; Iraq War
- Awards: Army Distinguished Service Medal; Defense Superior Service Medal (3); Legion of Merit (4); Bronze Star Medal

Lieutenant General Thomas R. Turner II (August 24, 1952 - August 27, 2024) was an American United States Army officer, who served as the commander of the 101st Airborne Division and United States Army North, Fort Sam Houston, Texas.

Turner graduated from the United States Military Academy in 1974 and was commissioned as second lieutenant in the Infantry. His first assignment was with the 1st Battalion, 8th Infantry, 4th Infantry Division (Mechanized), as a platoon leader and company executive officer. In August 1977, he was assigned as a platoon leader with the United Nations Command Security Force, Joint Security Area, Panmunjom, Korea. He attended the Infantry Officer Advance Course prior to taking command of B Company, 3rd Battalion, 19th Infantry, 24th Infantry Division (Mechanized) in Fort Stewart, Georgia. Following this assignment, he served as the Aide-de-Camp to the Deputy Commanding General, Combined Arms Combat Development Activity at Fort Leavenworth, Kansas.

In February 1981, Turner was assigned to the 2d Battalion, 75th Infantry (Ranger) where he served as the battalion S5 and company commander of C Company. Upon graduation from the Naval Postgraduate School and completion of the Armed Forces Staff College, he was assigned to the 75th Ranger Regiment where he served as the Regimental Plans and Liaison Officer. In September 1986, he was assigned to the 3rd Battalion, 75th Ranger Regiment, where he served as the battalion S3 (operations) and executive officer. Subsequently, he was named the Assistant to the Commander, 75th Ranger Regiment, during Operation Just Cause in Panama. Next, Turner was assigned as Commander, United Nations Command Security Force, Joint Security Area, Panmunjom, South Korea. Following completion of the United States Army War College at Carlisle Barracks, Pennsylvania, he assumed command of 2d Brigade, 325th Airborne Infantry Regiment, 82d Airborne Division, in Fort Bragg, North Carolina. Upon relinquishing command, he served as the Chief of Staff for the 82d Airborne Division. Selected to attend the Royal College of Defense Studies in London, England, he served a one-year tour as a British Defense college Fellow and was subsequently named the Executive Assistant to the Commander-in-Chief, United States Atlantic Command, and Supreme Allied Commander Atlantic, in Norfolk, Virginia.

In September 1999, Turner returned to Fort Bragg, North Carolina, where he served as the Chief of Staff, XVIII Airborne Corps. Following this assignment, he was named the Assistant Division Commander for Maneuver of the 1st Infantry Division, United States Army Europe and Seventh United States Army, Germany. In August 2001, he was assigned as the Deputy United States Military Representative to the NATO Military Committee in Brussels, Belgium. On 2 December 2002, Turner assumed command of the U.S. Army Southern European Task Force (Airborne) in Vicenza, Italy.

Following his assignment in Italy, Turner was made the commanding general of the 101st Airborne Division and Fort Campbell, Kentucky in May 2004. On September 23, 2005, Turner deployed with the 101st to Iraq for one year. On November 10, 2006, the 101st Airborne changed commands, with Turner turning over his command of the Division and Fort Campbell to Major General Jeffrey J. Schloesser.

On December 4, 2006, Turner received his third star and became the commanding general of United States Army North. Located on Fort Sam Houston, Texas, United States Army North is the Army's service component command for United States Northern Command and the United States Northern Command Joint Force Land Component Command.

Turner died on the 27 August 2024 in Alexandria, Virginia at the age of 72.

== Awards and decorations ==
- Defense Superior Service Medal with two oak leaf clusters
- Legion of Merit with two oak leaf clusters
- Defense Meritorious Service Medal
- Meritorious Service Medal with two oak leaf clusters
- Joint Service Commendation Medal
- Army Achievement Medal with oak leaf cluster
- Combat Infantryman Badge
- Expert Infantryman Badge
- Ranger Tab
- Master Parachutist Badge
- Pathfinder Badge
- Joint Staff Identification Badge
- Italian Parachutist Badge
