= 264th Combat Sustainment Support Battalion =

264th Combat Sustainment Support Battalion (264th CSSB)
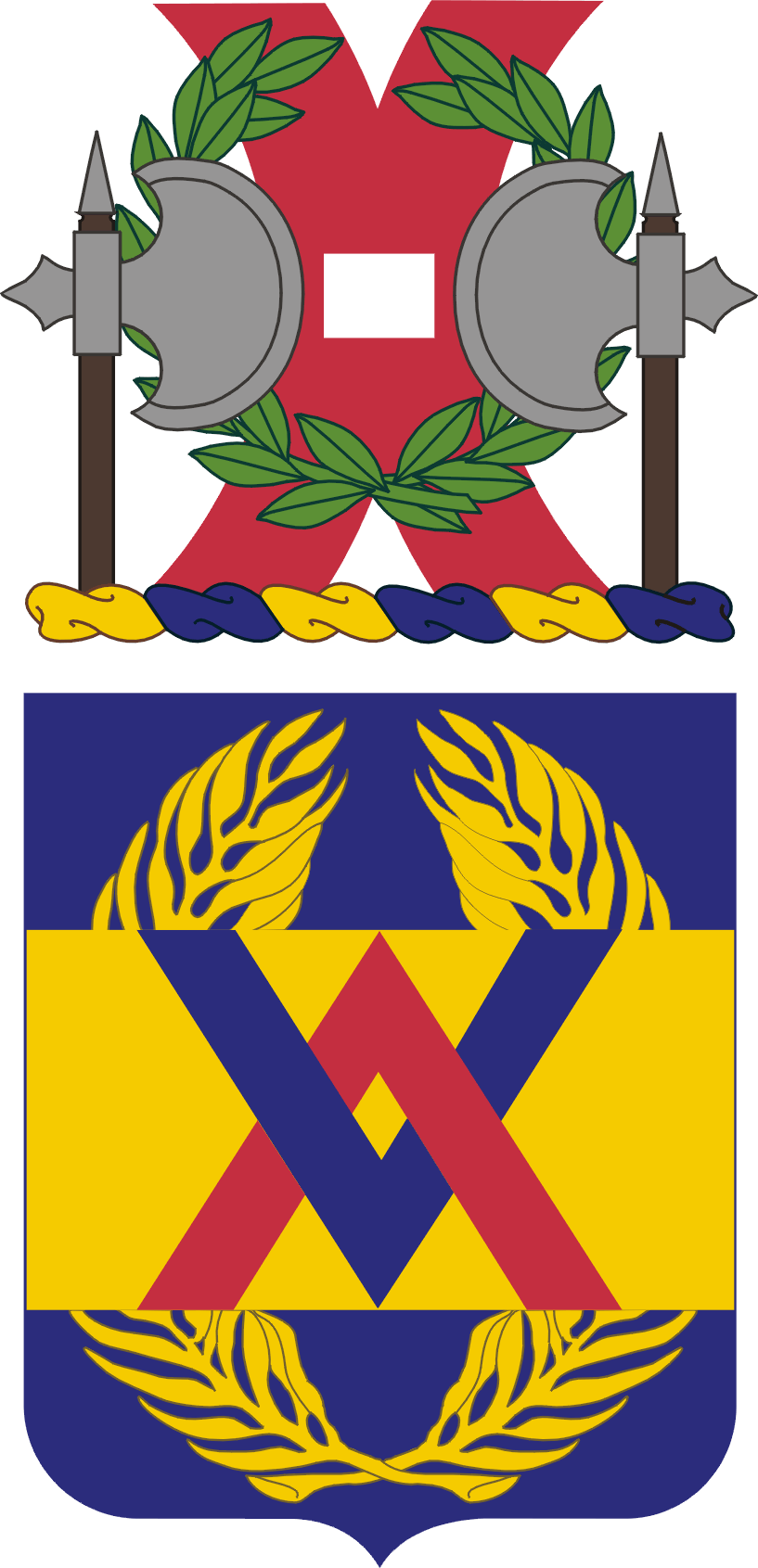
- Coat of arms
- Active: 1942–1946; 1966–1968; 1993–present
- Country: US
- Branch: U.S. Army
- Role: Mission Command of logistics units
- Size: Battalion
- Part of: 3rd Sustainment Command (Expeditionary)
- Garrison/HQ: Fort Bragg, North Carolina
- Motto: " Support for Victory "
- Anniversaries: 29 May 1942 unit activated
- Battle honours: World War II; Vietnam; Operation Enduring Freedom; Operation Iraqi Freedom

Insignia
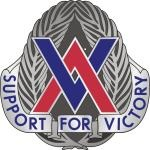
- Distinctive unit insignia

- 3rd Sustainment Command shoulder sleeve insignia worn by the 264th CSSB

The 264th Combat Sustainment Support Battalion (264th CSSB) is a U.S. Army support battalion stationed at Fort Bragg, North Carolina. The battalion motto is "Support for Victory". The 264th has deployed overseas to France, Vietnam, Haiti, Nicaragua, Guatemala, Afghanistan, and Iraq.

== Organization ==
The 264th CSSB is currently assigned to the 3rd Expeditionary Sustainment Command. Subordinate elements of the 264th are:

- 264th Combat Sustainment Support Battalion (264th CSSB)
  - Headquarters and Headquarters Detachment (HHD), 264th CSSB
  - 25th Quartermaster Company (Field Feeding)
  - 8th Ordnance Company (Ammunition)
  - 126th Transportation Company
  - 127th Quartermaster Company (Water)
  - 647th Quartermaster Company (Aerial Delivery)

Former subordinate units:

- 11th Quartermaster Company (Aerial Delivery)
- 40th Transportation Company
- 259th Quartermaster Company (Field Services)
- 503rd Support Maintenance Company
- 600th Quartermaster Company (Aerial Delivery)
- 612th Quartermaster Company (Aerial Delivery)
- 623rd Quartermaster Company (Aerial Delivery)
- 3153rd Quartermaster Service Company
- 3154th Quartermaster Service Company
- 3155th Quartermaster Service Company
- 3156th Quartermaster Service Company

== Service history ==
=== Activation ===
The 264th Combat Sustainment Support Battalion was originally activated on 29 May 1942, at Fort Dix, as the 264th Quartermaster Service Battalion.

=== World War II ===
The unit moved to Camp Kilmer in September 1942, where it was stationed until April 1944. In September 1943, while training at Camp Kilmer, the battalion was reorganized with companies A, B, C, D being reorganized as the 3153rd, 3154th, 3155th, and 3156th Quartermaster Service Companies. The Headquarters was re-designated as the Headquarters and Headquarters Detachment, 264th Quartermaster Battalion. In April 1944, it was transferred to Camp Lee, where it was assigned to prepare for extended field service. After four months at Camp Lee, the battalion was shipped overseas on board the RMS Scythia. It arrived in England in September 1944 and immediately moved to France, where it spent the duration of the World War II. The battalion participated in the Rhineland Campaign and inactivated in Paris, France, in June 1946.

=== Vietnam War ===
The 264th Quartermaster Battalion remained inactive for twenty years. As a result of the buildup of forces in Southeast Asia in the mid 1960s, the unit was activated and re-designated as the 264th Supply and Service Battalion. In Vietnam on 20 July 1966, it was stationed with the 506th Field Army Depot under the US Army Support Command, Saigon. During its service in Vietnam, it was organized as a general support unit to provide supply and stock control of field Army stocks managed by assigned or attached units. While serving in Southeast Asia, the battalion participated in five campaigns, and was inactivated on 1 September 1968.

=== 1990's ===
On 1 September 1993, the 264th Supply and Service Battalion was activated at Fort Bragg as the 264th Corps Support Battalion and assigned to the 507th Corps Support Group, 1st Corps Support Command. On 16 May 1994, the 264th was reassigned to the 46th Corps Support Group, 1st Corps Support Command. In September 1994, the 264th deployed to Haiti in support of Operation Uphold Democracy. In December 1998, the battalion deployed a Logistics Task Force to support hurricane relief efforts in Nicaragua and Guatemala.

=== 21st Century ===
In September 2002, the battalion deployed in support of Operation Enduring Freedom to Bagram, Afghanistan. The battalion deployed in support of Operation Iraqi Freedom to Baghdad, Iraq in June 2004. Upon inactivation of the 46th Corps Support Group on 15 February 2006 the 264th Corps Support Battalion was reassigned to the 507th Corps Support Group until its inactivation in February 2008. The 264th Combat Support Battalion was redesignated as the 264th Combat Sustainment Support Battalion and assigned to the 82nd Sustainment Brigade on 29 February 2008. The 264th Combat Sustainment Support Battalion deployed in support of Operation Iraqi Freedom to Al Taqaddum, Iraq in May, 2007 and again in support of Operation Iraqi Freedom in April 2009 to Tikrit, Iraq. The 264th Combat Sustainment Support Battalion was most recently assigned to USARNORTH in support of NORTHCOM in March 2014. In May 2015, the 264th was relieved of its assignment to the 82nd Sustainment Brigade and assigned to the 3rd Expeditionary Sustainment Command. The 264th Combat Sustainment Support Battalion, as its motto indicates, carries on its tradition of “Support for Victory.”

== Campaign streamers ==
Conflict	Streamer	Year(s)
World War II	Rhineland	1944
Vietnam War	Counteroffensive, Phase II	1966–1967
Vietnam War	Counteroffensive, Phase III	1967–1968
Vietnam War	Tet Counteroffensive	1968
Vietnam War	Counteroffensive, Phase IV	1968
Vietnam War	Counteroffensive, Phase V	1968
Operation Enduring Freedom	Consolidation I	2002–2003
Operation Iraqi Freedom	Transition of Iraq	2004
Operation Iraqi Freedom	Iraqi Governance	2004–2005
Operation Iraqi Freedom	Iraqi Surge	2007–2008
Operation Iraqi Freedom	Iraqi Sovereignty	2009–2010

== Decorations ==
Ribbon	Award	Year	Notes
	Meritorious Unit Commendation (Army)	2002–2003	Afghanistan
	Meritorious Unit Commendation (Army)	2004–2005	Iraq
	Meritorious Unit Commendation (Army)	2007–2008	Iraq
	Meritorious Unit Commendation (Army)	2009–2010	Iraq

== Shoulder sleeve insignia ==
Description: On a white disc within a 1/8 inch (.32 cm) red border, 2 inches (5.08 cm) in diameter overall, three blue arrowheads with points outward, arranged to form a triangle, one point up.

Background: The shoulder sleeve insignia was originally approved for the 3d Logistical Command on 20 May 1952. It was redesignated on 23 September 1974, for the 3d Support Command. The insignia was redesignated effective 16 September 2007, for the 3d Sustainment Command with the description updated. (TIOH Drawing Number A-1-30)

== Distinctive unit insignia ==
Description: A silver color metal and enamel device 1 1/8 inches (2.86 cm) in height overall, consisting of a scarlet chevron and a blue chevron (in reverse) interlaced above a silver scroll inscribed "SUPPORT FOR VICTORY" in blue letters, all in front of a silver wreath of two palm branches.

Symbolism: The battalion's mission is represented by a scarlet chevron which stands for "support". The reversed chevron forms a "V," representing "Victory," and the two conjoined chevrons signify "Support For Victory" which is written on a lace under both. The palm refers to the former unit's service in the Pacific area during the Vietnam War.

Background: The distinctive unit insignia was originally approved for the 264th Supply and Support Battalion on 3 April 1967. It was redesignated for the 264th Support Battalion with description and symbolism revised effective 1 September 1993.
