= 184th Sustainment Command =

- Active: 28 June 1921 - present
- Country: United States
- Branch: United States Army National Guard
- Role: Sustainment
- Size: Command
- Part of: Mississippi Army National Guard
- Garrison/HQ: Monticello, Mississippi
- Motto: Ever There
- Website: https://www.army.mil/184esc#org-about

Commanders
- Current commander: Brigadier General Christopher M Thomas
- Command Sergeant Major: CSM Stanley T. Williams

Insignia
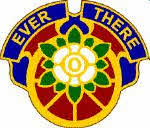
- 184th Sustainment Command DUI

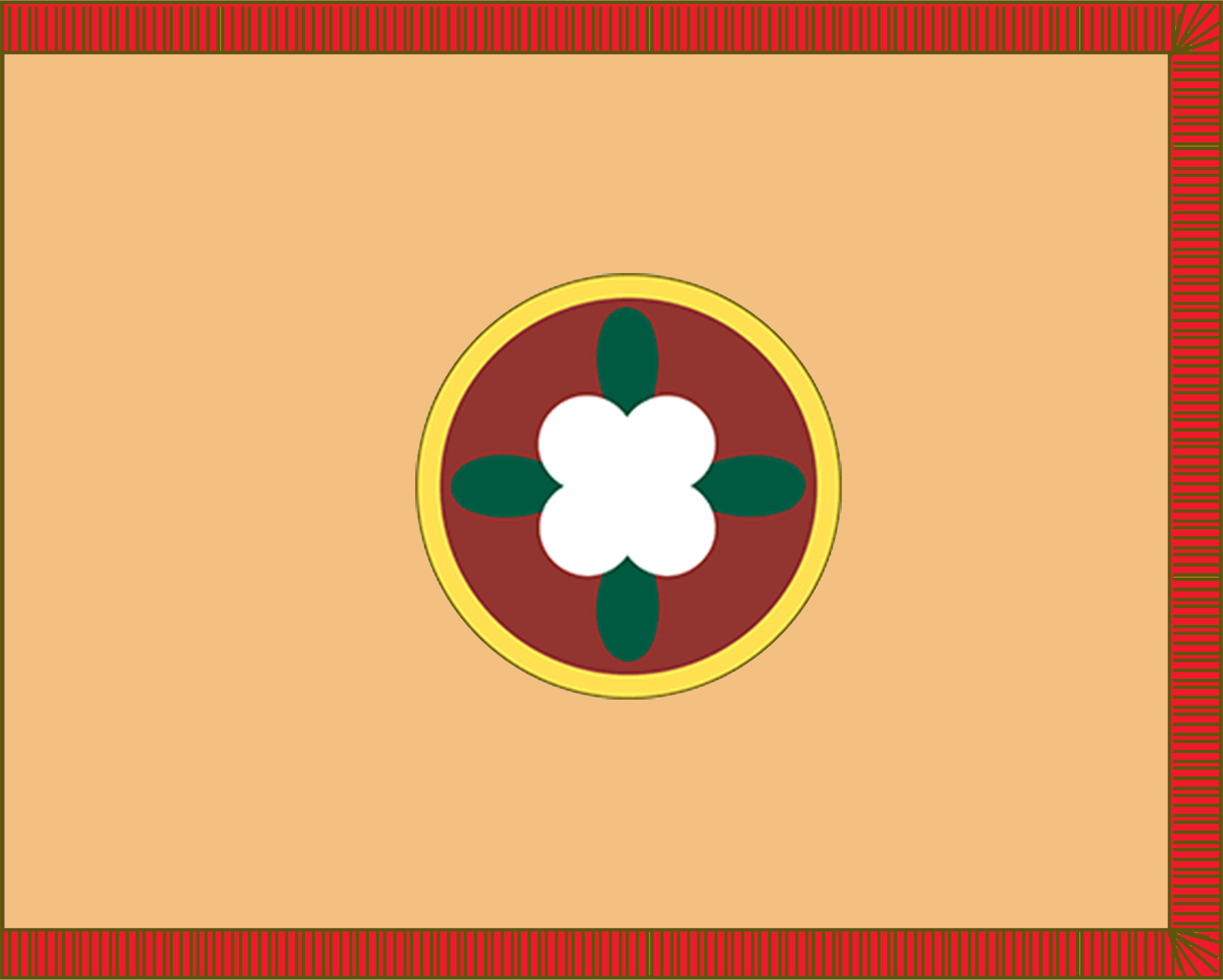
- 184th Sustainment Command Flag

The 184th Sustainment Command (184 ESC) is a Sustainment Command of the Mississippi Army National Guard (MS ARNG). The command began in 1921 as Laurel Co. 1st Infantry Mississippi National Guard.

== Subordinate Units ==
- 168th Engineer Brigade
  - 890th Engineer Battalion
  - 223d Engineer Battalion
  - 298th Support Battalion
  - 367th Maintenance Company
  - 3656th Maintenance Company
  - 1387th Quartermaster Company (water)
  - 1687th Transportation Company (medium truck)
  - 31st Support Detachment (Rear Operations Center)
  - 114th Support Detachment (Army Liaison Team)

== Insignia ==
The Shoulder Sleeve insignia is a brick red circle with a gold border. A white magnolia flower is in the center with four green leaves. The insignia was originally approved for the 184th Transportation Command on 2 January 1969.

The Distinctive Unit Insignia is a gold metal pin consisting of a gold wheel with 8 brick red sections. On the wheel is a magnolia flower. Above the wheel is a blue scroll with the words "Ever There."
