= 3rd Corps Sustainment Command =

- XVIII Airborne Corps SSI, worn by 3rd CSC
- Active: 1950 – present
- Country: USA
- Branch: United States Army
- Type: Expeditionary Sustainment Command
- Size: Approx 300 soldiers
- Garrison/HQ: Fort Bragg
- Motto: Spears Ready!
- Engagements: Korean War; Operation Iraqi Freedom; *Transition of Iraq; *Iraqi Governance; *National Resolution; Iraqi Surge; Iraqi Sovereignty; Operation Enduring Freedom

Commanders
- Commander: BG Raphael S. Heflin

Insignia
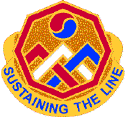
- Distinctive unit insignia

- Obsolete unit SSI

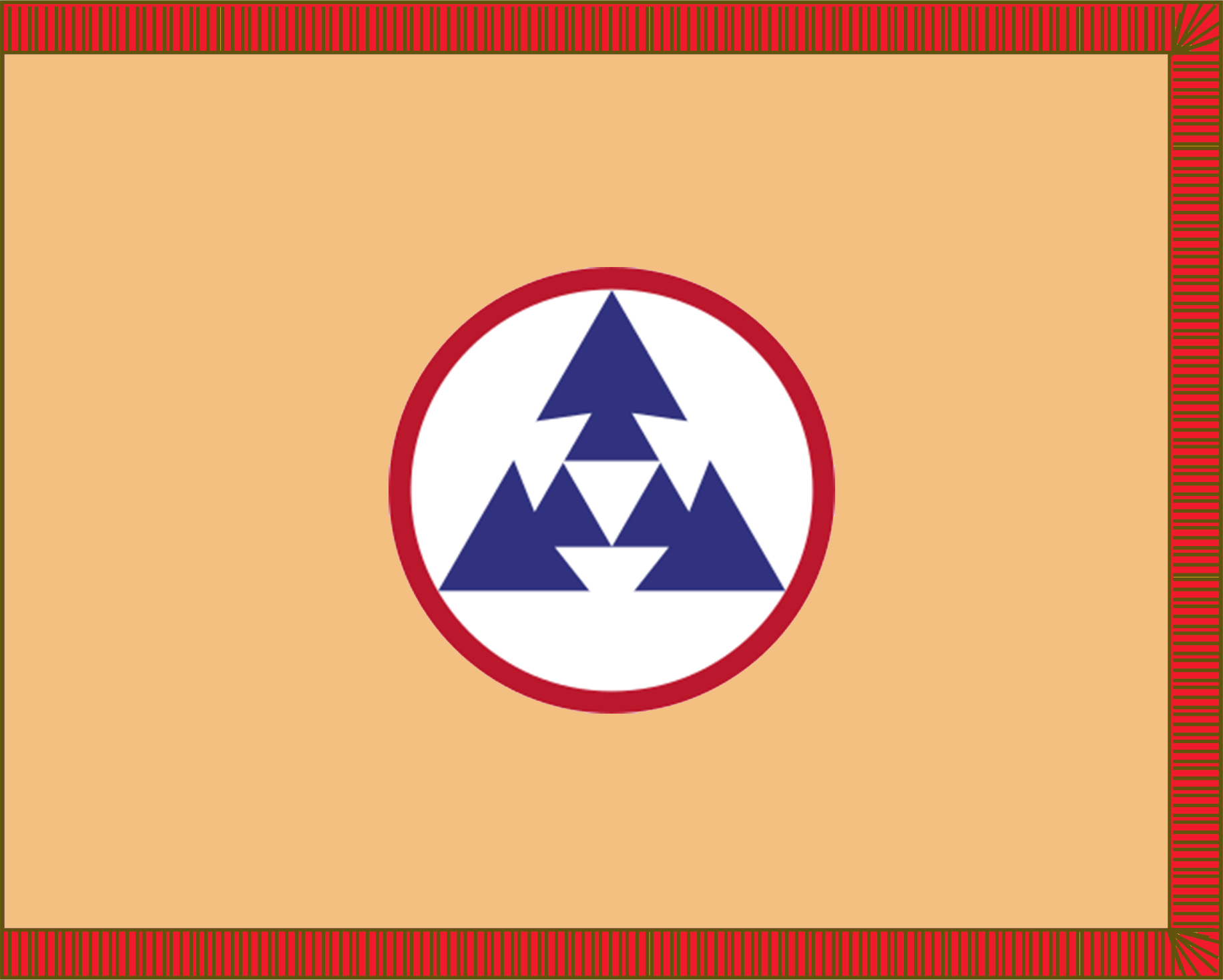
- 3rd Sustainment Command Flag

The 3rd Corps Sustainment Command is a United States Army unit. It derives its lineage from the 3rd Logistical Command, which was activated in Japan on 19 September 1950 for service in Korea.

The 3rd Corps Sustainment Command coordinates operational sustainment support to optimize delivery of sustainment effects in the XVIII Airborne Corps areas of operation. On order, the 3 ESC deploys into an Area of Operation (AO) or Joint Operations Area (JOA) to provide mission command of assigned units in order to achieve expeditionary operational reach in support of an Army Service Component Command (ASCC) or Joint Task Force (JTF).

== Insignia ==
The 3rd ESC shoulder sleeve insignia consists of three blue arrows pointing outwards, representing the Command's numerical designation and mission to provide combat support wherever it is needed. The arrows and arrowheads are symbols frequently used in U.S. Army insignia designs because they represent items used in warfare and defense. The red circle outlining the 3d ESC patch signifies the valor and courage of its soldiers. The while field represents purity and dedication.

In 2020, the 3rd ESC re-evaluated their insignia. The decision was made to update the insignia to better reflect 3rd ESC's mission to support the XVIII Airborne Corps. The new insignia is a parachute with three spears crossing the frontage.

== Badge and Motto ==
On 3 November 1976, the distinctive badge for the 3d COSCOM was authorized. The Korean tae-geuk within the octagon shape represents the unit's eight campaigns in the Korean War. The red, white, and blue interlaced chevronels symbolize the strong support offered by the command; three chevronels further distinguish the designation of the 3d Corps Support Command. Buff (gold) and scarlet are colors used for support units.

3d COSCOM adapted its official motto "Sustaining the Line!" in the fall of 1977. The command sponsored a contest for soldiers to provide a motto for the unit crest. In a meeting in early October, a dozen possible mottoes from soldiers across the command were selected. Warrant Officer Richard Jones of the 881st Maintenance Company, 8th Maintenance Battalion received a $25 savings bond for his contribution of "Sustaining the Line!"

In 2020, the 3rd ESC updated their motto to "Spears Ready!" to better reflect their new insignia and expeditionary capabilities.

== Korea ==
The 3rd Logistical Command arrived in Korea just 11 days after MacArthur's invasion and was assigned to X Corps. The command, just activated on 19 September under the Japan Logistical Command which was supporting the Eighth Army in Korea as the Far East Command requisitioning agency, assumed the task to unload, receive, store, and forward supplies for the X Corps. It established an initial supply level of 15 days and provided anti-aircraft and beach defense of the Inchon area. The concept of using a logistical command was a new one evolving from experiences during World War II. Korea marked the first use in combat of a logistical command organized under an approved table of organization. The attached corps combat service support structure was capable of providing support to units and included ordnance, quartermaster, transportation and medical units.

Prior to its inactivation on 20 March 1953, the 3d Logistical Command participated in eight Korean campaigns including the first United Nations Counter Offensive and three Korean winter campaigns. The command received two Republic of Korea Presidential Unit Citations for its meritorious service during the conflict.

== Germany ==
Reactivated after the experience in Korea, the consensus of those concerned seemed to be that the logistical command concept was sound. The great advantage of such an organization was that it represented an approved voucher against which a commander could set up a logistics support organization. The command was reactivated on 15 June 1958, in France and supported the U.S. Army Europe Communications Zone. In the spring of 1967, the unit left France and moved to Worms, Germany. On 2 June 1969, the command was again inactivated, with the majority of the soldiers and units joining existing support units already in Germany. Before the corps support command - or COSCOM - concept was adopted in the United States Army Europe, V and VII Corps received combat service support from support brigades. When Seventh Army was reduced to token representation, V and VII corps became separate commands subordinate to USAREUR. To operate independently, each required a corps support command. The second and third support brigades were assigned to V and VII corps, respectively, and became COSCOMs.

On 25 June 1969, 5th COSCOM was released from seventh army support command and was assigned to V Corps. 5th COSCOM was redesignated on 23 September 1974, as the 3rd Support Command (Corps), with its headquarters in Frankfurt, Germany. The designation "(Corps)" was dropped in late 1979. During the Cold War, the 3d Support Command stood in defense of Western Europe along with other forces. During the annual REFORGER (Return of Forces to Germany) exercises the command sustained V Corps during intensive tactical operations and deployment and redeployment operations. A typical REFORGER found the command supporting well over 70,000 troops and 20,000 vehicles during some of the most arduous winter conditions in Europe.

=== Nijmegen road march ===
In 1985 the 3d Support Command headquarters moved from Frankfurt to Wiesbaden, West Germany, after being next to V Corps HQs in Frankfurt for 16 years. In 1986 the command was selected to sponsor USAREUR's involvement in the 70th annual Nijmegen Road March in the Netherlands. The CG, USAREUR and 7th Army, then established the command as the permanent sponsor of the international road march. The command was redesignated as the 3d Corps Support Command in October 1988. More recently, 3d COSCOM has been a key participant in several critical support missions throughout the world. Besides playing a major role in the deployment and redeployment of USAREUR soldiers in support of operations Desert Shield and Desert Storm, over 1,600 soldiers deployed from the 3rd COSCOM to southwest Asia, including soldiers from the 181st Transportation Battalion and the 16th Corps Support Group.

== Balkans ==
Elements of the 3d COSCOM deployed to Zagreb, Croatia, in support of Operation Provide Promise from November 1992 to November 1993. Aviation support soldiers were deployed to Somalia from December 1992 through May 1993 in support of Operation Restore Hope. From July through December 1993, 3d COSCOM soldiers deployed to southwest Asia in support of Operation Provide Cover. Soldiers from every unit in the COSCOM deployed to the Balkans in 1999 in support of Task Force Hawk and Task Force Falcon, participating in the NATO-led air campaign in Kosovo to bring stability and peace to the region.

== Global War on Terror ==
In February 2003, the 3d COSCOM headquarters deployed in support of Operation Iraqi Freedom. The Command assumed control of over more than 17,000 Soldiers providing logistical support to US and Coalition forces. COSCOM units participated in every OIF rotation since 2003 as well as deploying to Afghanistan in support of Operation Enduring Freedom. The headquarters deployed a second time to Iraq in 2005 assuming control of over 20,000 soldiers while continuing to provide sustainment and distribution to Coalition Forces. Upon returning to Germany in September 2006, 3d COSCOM personnel began preparations to relocate the unit colors for the sixth time in its history.

The unit moved to Fort Knox, Kentucky in June 2007 and on 16 September 2007 the 3d COSCOM transformed into the 3d Sustainment Command (Expeditionary). After relocating to Fort Knox, the unit received personnel, equipment, and the mission to redeploy for a third-time to Iraq.

From 20 June 2008 until 7 August 2009, the 3d Sustainment Command assumed responsibility for sustainment and distribution support for all Coalition forces in the Iraqi Theater of Operations. The command provided logistical support and base life support to over 300,000 soldiers and civilians across Iraq, while working with the Iraqi Army to improve their logistics capability and make them self-sufficient. In 2012 the esteemed unit deployed to Kandahar Airfield, Afghanistan. The unit excelled in providing logistics across the 6 regional commands as they were the logistical experts for the Combined Joint Area of Operations for Afghanistan. The unit received a Meritorious Unit Citation for their efforts.

In March and April 2014 the unit deployed to Afghanistan and Kuwait in support of Operation Enduring Freedom. The 3rd ESC was responsible for successfully reducing the theater during the final stages of OEF and setting the conditions for Operation Resolute Support, beginning in 2015. The 3rd ESC was the last ESC to provide single sustainment mission command in Afghanistan and was composed of more than 35,000 Service members, Department of Defense civilians and contractors. They also managed many non-doctrinal responsibilities to include the redistribution, disposal, and retrograde of excess materiel, as well as the de-scope efforts associated with base closures across Afghanistan through U.S. Central Command's Materiel Recovery Element. The 3rd ESC accomplished, what is seen as arguably the largest and most demanding retrograde of equipment and personnel in the Army's modern era. This is due to the geographical location of Afghanistan and the aggressive timeline to retrograde equipment out of the country by the end of 2014. During the deployment, the 3d ESC managed the closing or transfer of 61 bases, retrograded nearly 5,500 vehicles and more than 105,000 pieces of other equipment, all while sustaining U.S. and coalition forces across Afghanistan's six regional commands. The 3rd ESC was involved in PhD-level logistics using lessons learned from Iraq to get the mission accomplished. Afghanistan is a landlocked country and to retrograde equipment it was necessary to use every possible transportation node while at the same time placing an emphasis on the stewardship of resources and creating efficiencies.

== Operation Unified Response - Haiti ==
Soldiers from the 3d ESC began deploying to Haiti within a week of the earthquake that devastated the country in January 2010. From 19 January to 3 February, the 3d ESCA's formation grew to a Joint Logistics Command supporting over 18,000 soldiers, sailors, airmen, Marines, Coast Guardsmen, civilians, USAID, NGO, DVO and other governmental agencies. Before redeploying on 9 March 2010, the 3d ESC provided humanitarian aid and medical support to the Haitian people as well as transportation, field services and sustainment for U.S. forces deployed in and around Haiti.

== Hurricane Relief ==
In 2017, the United States Army North (ARNORTH) appointed the 3rd ESC to have mission command over sustainment operations as part of the response efforts for the aftermaths of hurricanes Harvey in Texas, Irma in Florida, and Maria in Puerto Rico. During this mission the 3rd ESC unified efforts in a Joint Operations Area (JOA) with other organizations such as the Federal Emergency Management Agency (FEMA) and the Defense Support of Civil Authorities (DSCA), as well as elements from the U.S. Navy and U.S. Air Force. The command was the first active duty ESC to be given this mission. The 3rd ESC successfully deployed logistic capabilities in response of widespread damage, loss of power, and humanitarian crisis triggered by the lack of food, water and other supplies. The 3rd ESC's task organization while having mission command included elements from sustainment, medical, and military police units.

== COVID-19 ==
As part of the contingency operations that COVID-19 triggered, the XVIII Airborne Corps designated the 3rd ESC to provide sustainment capabilities in New York in the beginning of 2020. The command took ownership of the logistical aspect of the mission by providing fuel, clean water, meals, and other supplies. The team of sustainers not only set the conditions for the medical professionals to respond to the emergency, but also provided transportation and handling of equipment in support of continuous medical operations after the initial phase of the mission. Soldiers from the 101st Division Sustainment Brigade and the 548th Combat Sustainment Support Battalion combined expertise to work under the leadership of the 3rd ESC.

== Afghanistan Non-Combatant Evacuation Operation ==
In August 2021, under the 1st Theater Sustainment Command (TSC), the 3rd ESC focused priorities on the Non-Combatant Evacuation Operation (NEO) and Operation Allies Refuge (OAR) that took place in Afghanistan. The 3rd ESC was integral during the evacuation of over 100,000 Afghan nationals and the joint draw down of 7,000 troops during the operation in Hamid Karzai International Airport (HKIA). During the two-week long mission in HKIA, the command provided sustainment operational expertise where critical commodities and equipment were provided to personnel on ground via historic air transportation that involved a flow of numerous C-17 aircraft. Upon evacuation, the 3rd ESC was essential in the establishment of shelters for refugees across the Central Command (CENTCOM) area of responsibility. This operation, where the Army, Air Force, Department of State, and Non-Governmental Organizations were involved, is considered the largest NEO in U.S. history.

== Current activities ==
The unit relocated to Fort Bragg, NC from Fort Knox, KY in 2015.

=== Kuwait ===
In August 2021, the 3rd ESC headquarters deployed to Camp Arifjan, Kuwait, to assume the role as the Operational Command Post for the 1st Theater Sustainment Command, with the mission to provide Theater Sustainment Mission Command to Army, Joint, and Multinational Forces in the USCENTCOM Area of Responsibility, enabling Unified Land Operations and Theater Security Cooperation. The 3rd ESC supported Operations Inherent Resolve (Iraq), Freedom Sentinel (Afghanistan), Spartan Shield (Kuwait), provided logistics and sustainment support and oversight to the Multinational Forces and Observer mission - Task Force Sinai, and supported USCENTCOM forward elements in Jordan and Syria.

=== Organization ===
- 7th Transportation Brigade (Expeditionary), at Joint Base Langley–Eustis (VA)
- 18th Airborne Corps Finance Battalion, at Fort Bragg (NC)
- 264th Combat Sustainment Support Battalion, at Fort Bragg (NC)
- 330th Movement Control Battalion, at Fort Bragg (NC)

== Leadership ==
=== Current Leadership ===
Command Group:

- Commanding General BG Raphael S. Heflin
- Command Sergeant Major CSM John S. Jerkins

=== Past Leadership ===
Commanders:

- June 2024 - November 2025: BG Peter L. Gilbert
- June 2022 - June 2024: BG John (Brad) Hinson
- Jun 2020 - June 2022: BG Lance G. Curtis
- Oct 2018 - June 2020: BG James M. Smith
- Jun 2017 - Oct 2018: BG Christopher O. Mohan
- Jul 2015 - Jun 2017: BG Christopher J. Sharpsten
- Jun 2013 - Jul 2015: BG Flem (Donnie) Walker
- Jun 2011 - Jun 2013: BG Kristin K. French
- Aug 2009 - Jul 2011: BG Robin B. Akin
- Sep 2006 - Aug 2009: BG Michael J. Lally

Command Sergeants Major:

- Jun 2022 - Nov 2024: CSM Adam T. Lepley
- July 2020 - Jun 2022: CSM Phelicea M. Redd
- Dec 2017 - Jul 2020: CSM Sean J. Rice
- Dec 2017 - Nov 2018: CSM Bernard Smalls SR
- Dec 2015 - Dec 2017: CSM Ian C. Griffin
- Jan 2014 - Dec 2015: CSM Edward A. Bell
- Dec 2011 - Oct 2013: CSM Karl Roberts SR
- Oct 2006 - Dec 2011: CSM Willie C. Tennant SR
