= Attorney General Caldwell =

Attorney General Caldwell may refer to:

- Alfred Caldwell Jr. (1847–1925), Attorney General of West Virginia
- Aquilla B. Caldwell (1814–1893), Attorney General of West Virginia
- Buddy Caldwell (born 1946), Attorney General of Louisiana
- Clarence C. Caldwell (1877–1957), Attorney General of South Dakota
