= William B. Caldwell III =

United States Army general

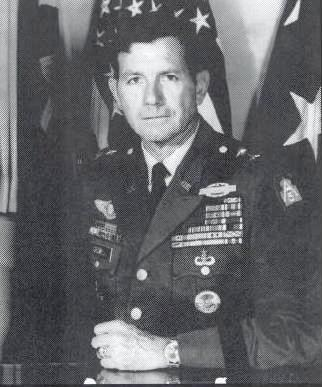
- Born: July 20, 1925; Fort Moultrie, South Carolina, U.S.
- Died: March 17, 2013 (aged 87); Columbus, Georgia, U.S.
- Burial place: Fort Benning, Georgia
- Relatives: Lt. Gen. William B. Caldwell IV (son).
- Military career
- Allegiance: United States
- Branch: United States Army
- Service years: 1948–1980
- Rank: Lieutenant General
- Nickname: Bill
- Commands: Fifth United States Army; Readiness Region VI; Army Training Center at Fort Jackson; 1st Brigade, 1st Infantry Division
- Conflicts: Korean War; Vietnam War
- Awards: Army Distinguished Service Medal; Silver Star Medal (3); Legion of Merit (5); Distinguished Flying Cross; Bronze Star Medal (3); Purple Heart; Air Medal (16)

William Burns Caldwell III (July 20, 1925 – March 17, 2013) was a United States Army general who retired as the Fifth United States Army commanding general at Fort Sam Houston in San Antonio. A combat veteran of wars in Korea and Vietnam, he was awarded the Silver Star on three occasions.

== Early life and education ==
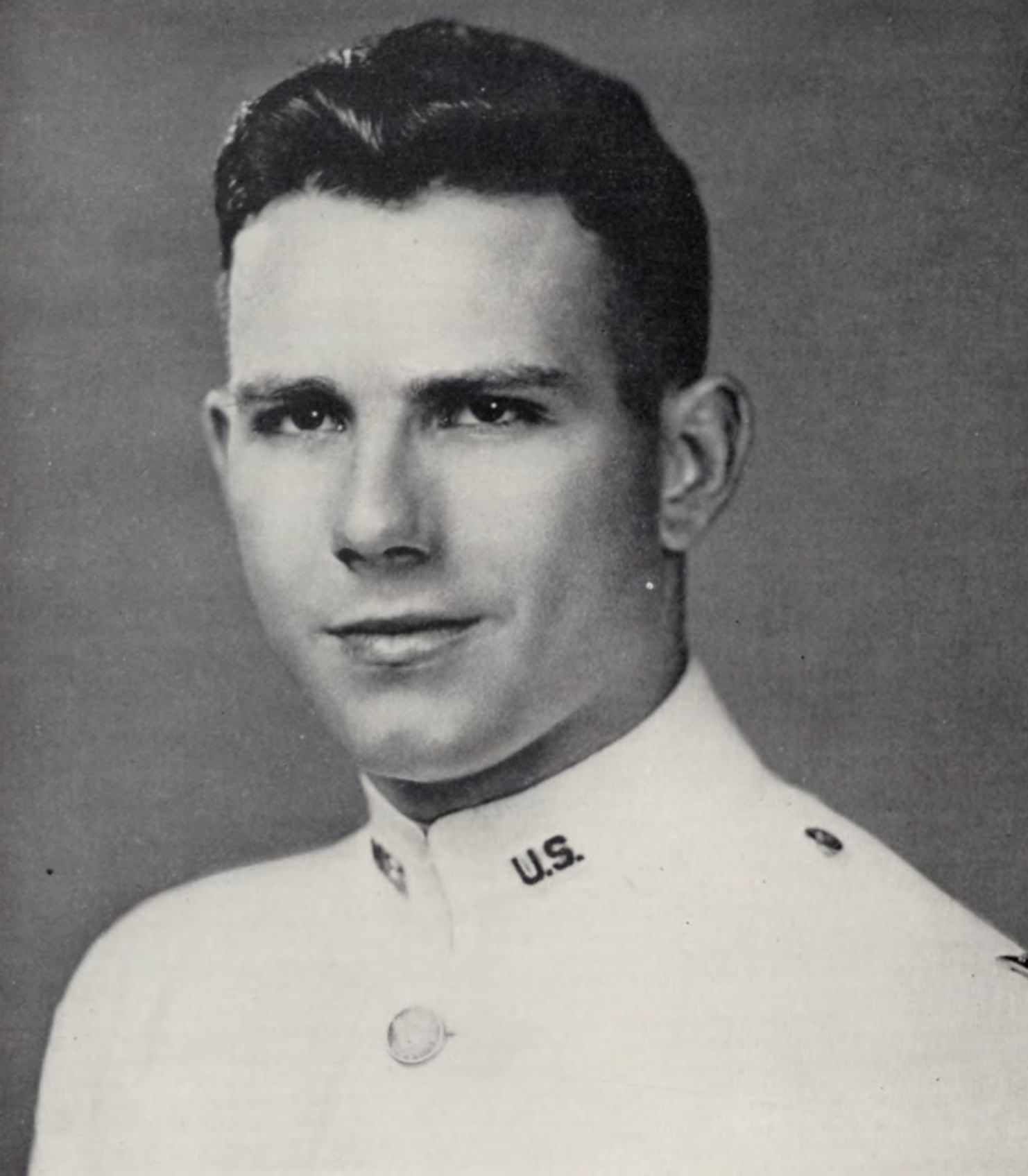
Caldwell as a United States Military Academy cadet c. 1948

Caldwell was born on July 20, 1925, at Fort Moultrie, South Carolina, into a military family. His father was a soldier, and his grandfather fought for the Union Army in the American Civil War.

When Caldwell was 16, he lived with his family at Schofield Barracks, Hawaii, where he witnessed the Pearl Harbor attack on December 7, 1941. a Japanese plane strafe an officer running down their street. Caldwell, his mother, and his sister moved to Los Angeles where he finished high school.

Caldwell spent one semester at Texas A&M University before attending Millard's Preparatory School in Washington, D.C.. From there, he was accepted to the United States Military Academy at West Point, New York.

After serving as the operations officer for the 1st Division in Germany, he attended Command and General Staff College at Fort Leavenworth, Kansas. During 1963–64, he attended the National War College and George Washington University, where he earned a master's degree in international relations.

== Military career ==
Commissioned as second lieutenant in the infantry in 1948, Caldwell attended ground general school at Fort Riley, Kansas and the Infantry School at Fort Benning in Columbus, Georgia. Second Lieutenant Caldwell was assigned to the 1st Battalion, 34th Infantry Regiment, 24th Infantry Division, which served as a Japanese occupation force on Kyushu. His unit was later deployed to Korea and was one of the first U.S. combat troops there. For heroism and gallantry in the Korean War, he was awarded two Silver Stars and a Bronze Star with Valor.

After the Korean War, Caldwell served in a variety of command staff positions in the United States and Europe. In 1954, Caldwell served as Operations Officer for the 1st Infantry Division in Germany and in Fort Riley, Kansas. As he departed Fort Riley, his efficiency report highlighted that he is "...a positive and incisive thinker and meticulous planner... natural leader... possesses a well-developed sense of humor, tact and diplomacy."

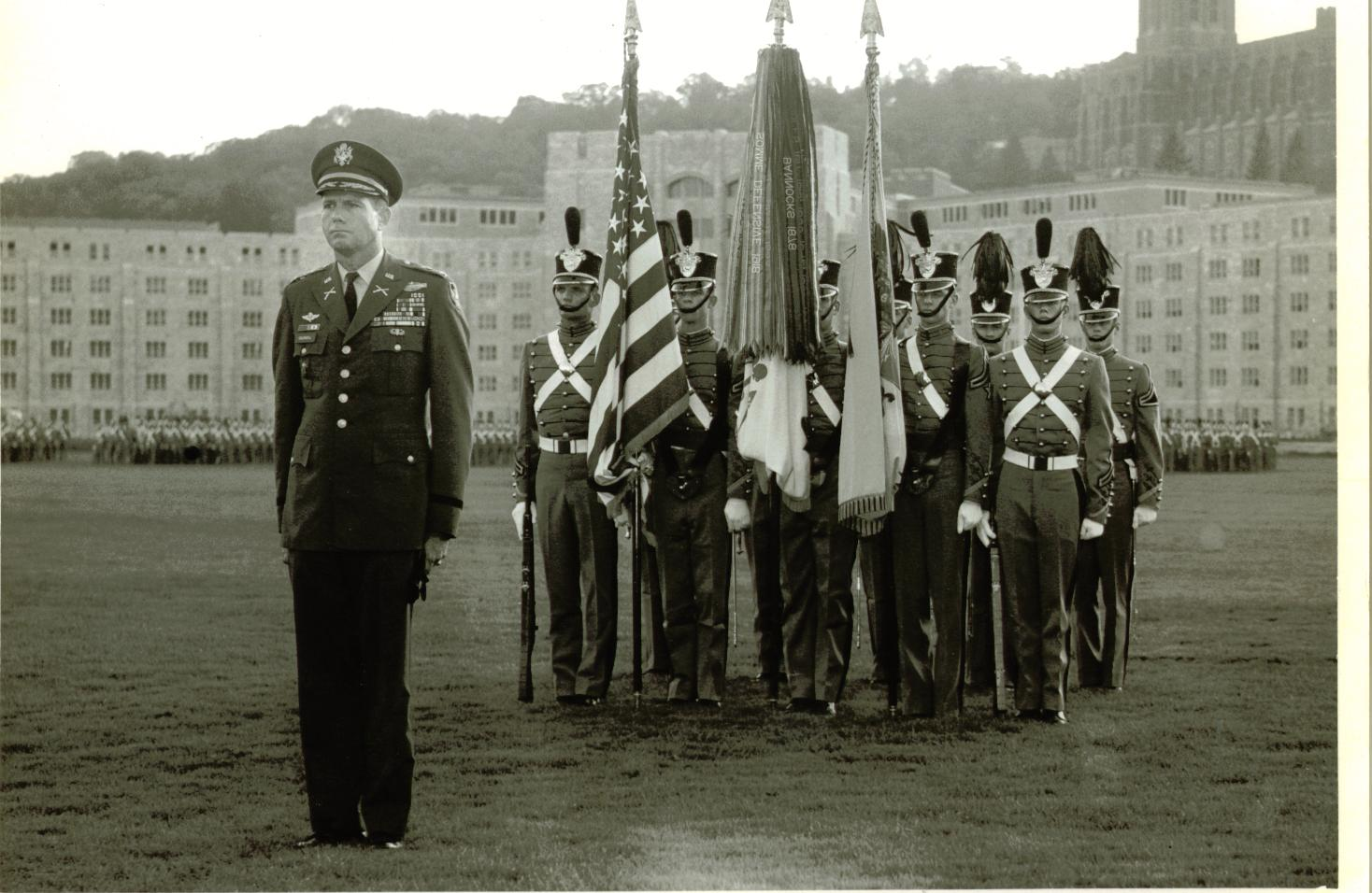
COL Caldwell commanded the Second Regiment of the U.S. Cadet Corps.

Caldwell served at West Point twice during his career. First, as a tactical officer in 1960 and again as the commander of the Second Regiment of the U.S. Cadet Corps from 1968 to 1969. Caldwell loved West Point and imparted his tactical knowledge, dedication to the Army, and his leadership philosophy to the Corps of Cadets.

During the Vietnam War, he served as a brigade commander for the 1st Brigade, 1st Infantry Division.

When his brigade was under assault, Colonel Caldwell directed a counter-assault and was awarded his third Silver Star and the Distinguished Flying Cross. After brigade command, he remained in Vietnam and served as a senior military advisor at the Civil Operations Development Center, III Corps.

After a combat tour in the Vietnam War and his tour at the U.S. Military Academy, Caldwell and his family boarded the Queen Mary for an assignment at NATO's Supreme Headquarters Allied Powers Europe (SHAPE). After three years in Belgium, he and his family moved to Germany where he served as Assistant Division Commander (Maneuver) of the Fourth and later the First Armored Division.

In 1973, Caldwell returned with his family to Washington, D.C., where he oversaw the dissemination of all foreign military aid from the Office of the Secretary of Defense. Then, he commanded the Army Training Center at Fort Jackson, South Carolina. He instituted the post's motto, "Victory Starts Here." In 1975, Time magazine did a profile of training the post-Vietnam War U.S. Army. Caldwell, who oversaw the effort to train an all-volunteer force said, "Our mission is to develop a highly motivated, disciplined soldier who knows the basic skills of his craft. Unlike the Marines—and I don't mean to criticize them—we don't first break a man down and then rebuild him. We think that he should be able to think for himself. He should respond to orders, but we don't want to set him in a mold." Caldwell's installation was also considered to be the most gender friendly in the country and he actively supported the recruitment and integration of women in the U.S. Army.

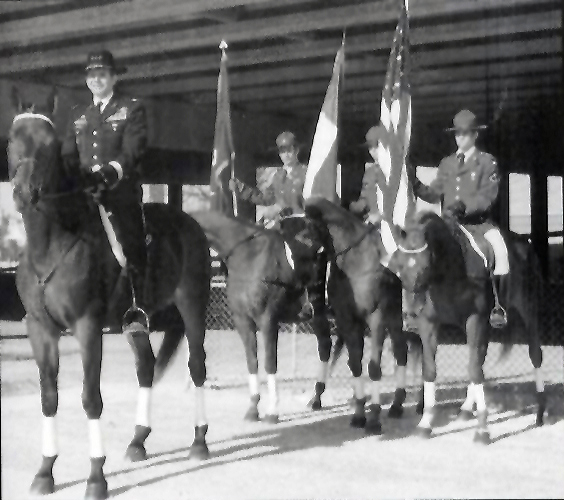
Caldwell with a color guard at San Antonio's "Remember the Alamo" parade.

He held two final command positions before retirement in 1980. His penultimate position was as commander for Readiness Region VI at Fort Knox, Kentucky. And in July 1978, he was promoted to lieutenant general and assumed command of Fifth Army at Fort Sam Houston in San Antonio. At Fifth Army, he oversaw the training of about 270,000 National Guardsmen and Army Reservists.

=== Korean War ===
Caldwell's regiment was among the first U.S. forces committed to combat in Korea in July 1950. Like many units at the time, Caldwell's regiment was understrength and ill-equipped for combat with North Korean forces. The regiment had no tank company and virtually no anti-tank capability. Much of their ammunition was old and the unit had limited medical support. The forces arrived in the port of Pusan in an old Japanese hospital ship and then pushed north via train to Taejon. At Pyongtek south of Suwon Air Base, Caldwell's regiment set up defensive positions with "Task Force Smith."

On July 19, 1950, a North Korean company ambushed Caldwell's platoon. Awarded his first Silver Star that day, the citation read "without regard for his own safety, he personally led an assault on the enemy's lines, and the men, inspired by his gallant example, overran the position... He fearlessly advanced into the face of withering fire, killed four of the enemy, reached his fallen men, and directed their evacuation to friendly positions." The following day, American forces led by General William Dean were decimated. Lieutenant Caldwell and Captain Micky Marks scouted for help and commandeered a train to Yosu, which enabled the evacuation of their men who had no food or water for five days.

Within two months of arriving on the Korean Peninsula, only 168 of the original 1,968 men remained. Caldwell's battalion was combined with others to become the 3rd Battalion, 19th Infantry, 24th Infantry Division. Bill had come to Korea as a platoon leader, but assumed company command and received a battlefield promotion to captain on August 30, 1950. With reinforcements, Caldwell's unit broke out of the Pusan Perimeter in early September and steadily proceeded northward to North Korea's capital by Thanksgiving.

After the Chinese reinforced North Korea, American forces were pushed back. On February 3, 1951, Captain Caldwell led "L" Company, 19th Infantry Regiment to secure the approaches to the Han River. The enemy counter-attacked, but Caldwell's company rallied. He was awarded a second Silver Star that day. Part of the citation read, "With the enemy about to overrun his positions and the entire perimeter in danger, Captain Caldwell, completely disregarding personal safety, once again rallied his men and personally led a daring counterattack, employing rifles and grenades, which broke the back of the enemy's attack and forced him to withdraw leaving an estimated 100 dead." Caldwell redeployed from Korea in August 1951. He later remarked, "After Korea, you knew you could do anything. We had tackled the very worst that could ever happen."

=== Vietnam War ===
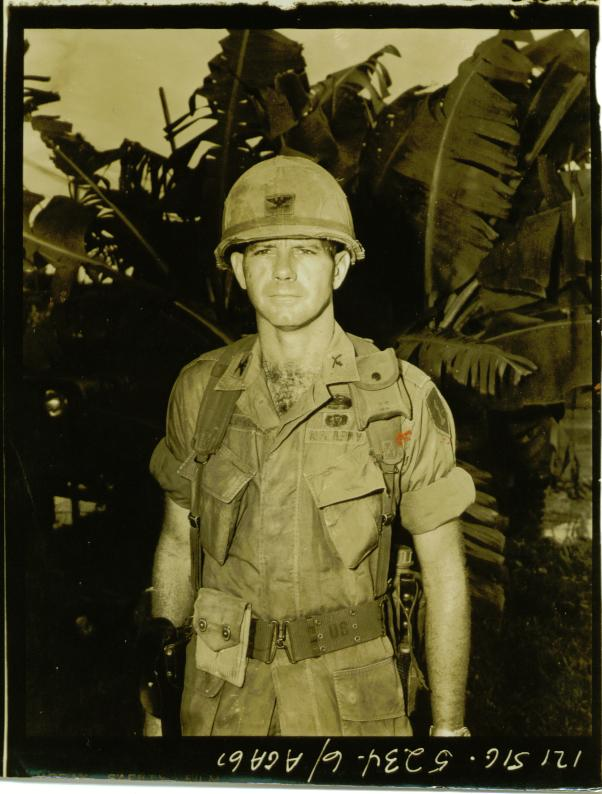
In Vietnam, Caldwell oversaw training and equipping of paramilitary forces.

Five months after the birth of his last child, the newly appointed Colonel Caldwell reported for duty in Vietnam from 1967 to 1968 initially as commander of the 1st Brigade, 1st Infantry Division.

On February 24, 1967, Caldwell learned that his brigade was under heavy assault near Ap Gu and flew to the combat zone. He initially directed fire from the air; after his helicopter landed in a non-secure area, Caldwell directed the counter-assault from the ground with his troops. Because of his actions that day, he was awarded his third Silver Star for gallantry in action against a hostile force. The citation partly read, "Although continuously exposed to intensive hostile fire... Through superb planning and tireless supervision... With complete disregard for his personal safety... His presence in the areas of heaviest conflict greatly inspired his men and they soon routed the large insurgent force." For his heroism that day, Caldwell also received the Distinguished Flying Cross.

From September 1967 to January 1968, Caldwell served as a senior military advisor at the Civil Operations Development Center, III Corps. In this capacity, he oversaw the training and equipping of the South Vietnamese paramilitary forces. While not exercising command and control of RVN forces, he was present during many battles advising RVN commanders on tactics.

=== Major permanent duty assignments ===
- Chief, Strategic Plans Branch, Supreme Headquarters Allied Powers Europe
- Assistant Division Commander, 4th Armored Division, United States Army, Europe
- Assistant Division Commander, 1st Armored Division, United States Army, Europe
- Chief of Staff, VII Corps, United States Army, Europe
- Deputy Director, Security Assistance Plans, Policy, and Programs, Office, Assistant Secretary of Defense
- Director, Security Assistance, Plans and Programs Formulation, Office, Assistant Secretary of Defense
- Commanding General, United States Army Training Center and Fort Jackson, South Carolina
- Commanding General, United States Army Readiness Region VI, Fort Knox, Kentucky
- Commanding General, 5th Army

== Dates of rank ==
- 2LT – 1948
- 1LT – 1950
- CPT – 1950 (battlefield promotion)
- MAJ – 1954
- LTC – 1960
- COL – 1966
- BG – 1969
- MG – 1973
- LTG – 1978

== Awards and decorations ==
U.S. military decorations
	Army Distinguished Service Medal
	Silver Star Medal (with 2 Oak Leaf Clusters)
	Legion of Merit (with 4 Oak Leaf Clusters)
	Distinguished Flying Cross
	Bronze Star Medal with "V" Device (with 2 Oak Leaf Clusters)
	Purple Heart
	Air Medal (with 3 silver Oak Leaf Clusters)
	Army Commendation Medal (with 1 Oak Leaf Cluster)
U.S. unit awards
	Presidential Unit Citation (24th Div)
	Army Meritorious Unit Commendation (34th Infantry)
U.S. non-military decorations
no image	State Department Superior Honor Award -->
U.S. service (campaign) medals and service and training ribbons
	American Campaign Medal
	World War II Victory Medal
	Army of Occupation Medal
	National Defense Service Medal (with Bronze Oak Leaf Cluster)
	Korean Service Medal (with Silver Campaign Star)
	Vietnam Service Medal (with 2 Bronze Campaign Stars)
Non-U.S. service medals and ribbons
	Vietnam Army Distinguished Service Order, 2nd Class
	Vietnam Gallantry Cross with Palm
	Vietnam Armed Forces Honor Medal, 1st Class
	Republic of Korea Presidential Unit Citation
	Republic of Vietnam Gallantry Cross Unit Citation
	Republic of Vietnam Civil Actions Medal Unit Citation
	United Nations Korea Medal
	Vietnam Campaign Medal
	Republic of Korea War Service Medal

Badges
Combat Infantryman Badge (2 awards)
Senior Parachutist Badge
Office of the Secretary of Defense Identification Badge
Army Staff Identification Badge
German Parachutist Badge in bronze
Vietnam Parachutist Badge

== Personal ==
Caldwell married Theresa Knight "Tudy" Dismuke in 1949. They had five children together, to include William B. Caldwell IV who would later become a U.S. Army general as well. Theresa died about a year after his retirement from the Army. Caldwell and his wife were buried at the Fort Benning Main Post Cemetery.
