= Perry L. Wiggins =

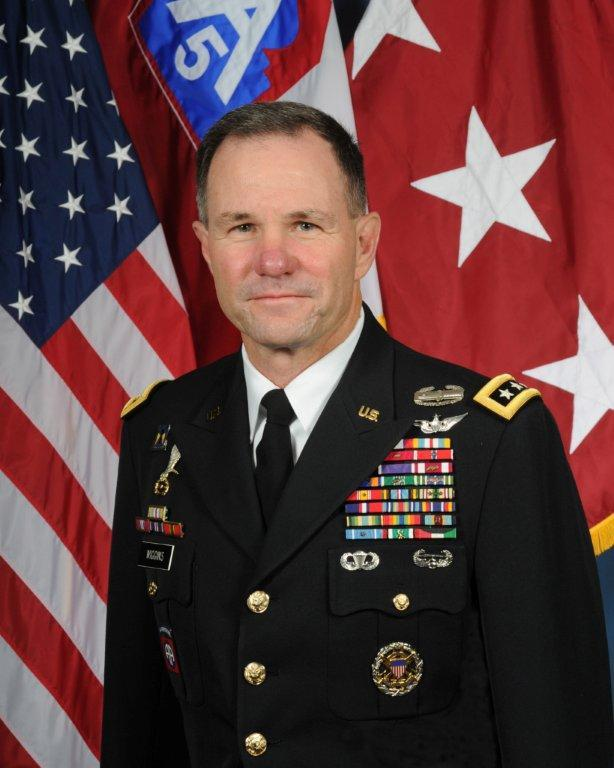
- Born: September 1, 1961 (age 65)
- Military career
- Allegiance: United States
- Branch: United States Army
- Service years: 1983–2016
- Rank: Lieutenant General
- Commands: United States Army North; First Army Division West
- Conflicts: Gulf War; Bosnian War; Iraq War
- Awards: Army Distinguished Service Medal (2); Defense Superior Service Medal; Legion of Merit (3); Bronze Star Medal (2); Purple Heart

Perry Louis Wiggins (born September 1, 1961) is a retired United States Army lieutenant general who served as commanding general, United States Army North. He assumed command in September 2013, having previously served as Deputy Commanding General. He is the son of a former senior noncommissioned officer and earned his commission as an Infantry lieutenant from Mercer University in 1983. Wiggins retired on September 30, 2016.
