= 2nd Brigade Combat Team, 1st Cavalry Division =

One of three basic maneuver units of the 1st Cavalry Division, US Army

- 2nd Brigade logo
- Active: 1917 – present
- Country: United States
- Branch: United States Army
- Nickname: "Black Jack Brigade"

Commanders
- Notable commanders: Verne D. Mudge

The 2nd Brigade Combat Team, 1st Cavalry Division (the "Black Jack Brigade") is a cavalry unit of the United States Army based in Fort Hood, Texas.

== Current Units ==
- Headquarters and Headquarters Troop (HHT) 2nd Brigade Combat Team (2nd BCT)
- 1st Battalion, 5th Cavalry Regiment (1-5th CR)
- 1st Battalion, 8th Cavalry Regiment (1-8th CR)
- 1st Battalion, 9th Cavalry Regiment (1-9th CR)
- 4th Squadron, 9th Cavalry Regiment (4-9th CR)
- 3rd Battalion, 16th Field Artillery Regiment (3-16th FAR)
- 8th Brigade Engineer Battalion "Trojan Horse" (8th BEB)
- 15th Brigade Support Battalion (15th BSB)

== History ==
=== Mexican Campaign ===
The history of the 2nd "Black Jack" Brigade, 1st Cavalry Division can be traced to 29 August 1917, when it was first constituted in the Regular Army as Headquarters, 2nd Cavalry Brigade. It was organized on 27 December 1917 at Fort Bliss, Texas, as an element of the 15th Cavalry Division. The brigade's early years consisted of rigorous training and patrolling of the Mexican border. Operating from horseback, the cavalry was ideal for fighting in the harsh desert terrain. It was relieved on 12 May 1918 from assignment and demobilized on 9 July 1919 at Fort Bliss, Texas. It was reconstituted on 20 August 1921 in the Regular Army as Headquarters, 2nd Cavalry Brigade and assigned as a member of the 1st Cavalry Division. The unit was organized on 14 September 1921 at Fort Bliss, Texas. At that time, subordinate units consisted of the 2nd Machine Gun Squadron, the 7th Cavalry Regiment, and 8th Cavalry Regiment.

=== WWII ===
In February 1943, the 2nd Brigade was alerted for an overseas assignment as a dismounted infantry unit assigned to the Pacific theater. The Black Jack Brigade's first WWII combat duty occurred in the 1944 Admiralty Island campaign. In three months of hard fighting they seized the islands of Los Negros, Hauwei, Butjo Luo, and Manus, and alongside the 1st Brigade, destroyed a force of over Japanese. The newly secured islands provided a strategically vital offensive base for Allied air and naval power, from which they could disrupt enemy supply lanes in a 1,500-mile (2,400 km) radius and provide critical support for the Allied advance during the invasion of the Philippines.

The Black Jack Brigade was called upon again during the liberation of the Philippines, where the brigade fought in both the Leyte and Luzon campaigns. On 20 October 1944, 2nd Brigade soldiers were among the first to storm the beaches of Leyte in what was the largest amphibious operation to date in the Pacific theater. Their contributions led to a victory that would prove to be decisive in the battle for the Philippines.

On 9 January 1945, the 2nd Brigade then participated in the invasion of Luzon, the largest of the Philippines Islands. The brigade was the first into Manila, liberating the Philippine Capital and freeing over 4000 civilians from enemy prison camps. The conquest of Leyte and Luzon were vital to operations in the Pacific, as they denied critical resources to the enemy and provided a staging area from which assaults in the Japanese home islands could be launched. The brigade left Luzon in August 1945 for occupation duty in Japan, becoming the first Allied unit to enter the city of Tokyo. The brigade was inactivated on 25 March 1949 and relieved from assignment to the 1st Cavalry Division.

=== German occupation ===
On 20 May 1949 it was converted and redesignated as the 2nd Constabulary Brigade. The brigade served in Germany until it was inactivated on 15 December 1951.

=== Korea ===
On 1 September 1963 the brigade was reactivated again in Korea as the Headquarters and Headquarters Company, 2nd Brigade, 1st Cavalry Division. The brigade remained at Camp Howze in Korea until 1 July 1965, when the division colors were transferred to Fort Benning, Georgia.

=== Vietnam ===
The division was reorganized and activated as the 1st Cavalry Division (Airmobile), the Army's first Air Assault division. Secretary of Defense Robert S. McNamara shocked many observers when he announced that this new air assault division would be combat ready in only eight weeks. The 1st Cavalry Division (Airmobile) exceeded that demanding goal by reaching REDCON-1 status on 28 July 1965 and deploying to Vietnam in mid-August, only six weeks after the division's organization. The men of 2nd Brigade boarded the USNS General Simon B. Buckner on 16 August 1965, en route to Vietnam.

On 14 September 1965, the 2nd Brigade disembarked the USNS Buckner and landed at Qui Nhơn. The brigade, consisting of 1/5 Cavalry, 2nd Battalion, 5th Cavalry Regiment and 2nd Battalion, 12th Cavalry Regiment, loaded into helicopters and flew in-land to the division base camp at Camp Radcliff, An Khê District.

The 2nd Brigade became the first brigade in the division to see combat when on 18 September 1965 the 2/12 Cavalry was OPCONed to 101st Airborne Division to participate in Operation Gibralter.

The 2nd Brigade would next see combat in Operation Silver Bayonet, where under the order of US Commanding General William Westmoreland the 1st Cavalry Division air assaulted into Pleiku Province to pursue and destroy the enemy over 2,500 square miles (6,500 km^{2}) of jungle. Operation Silver Bayonet, also known as the Pleiku campaign, was a 35-day campaign in which the division maintained almost constant contact with the enemy and experienced some of the fiercest fighting of the Vietnam War. The division saw its first contact on 1 November 1965, when a troop from 1st Battalion, 9th Cavalry Regiment Cavalry, the division's reconnaissance squadron, overran an enemy aid station belonging to the People's Army of Vietnam (PAVN) 33rd Regiment. After landing to exploit the site, they were engaged by a PAVN battalion, in fighting which was too close to allow for artillery or tactical air reinforcement. 1/12 Cavalry, 2nd Battalion, 8th Cavalry Regiment and 2nd Brigade's 2/12 Cavalry rushed to the embattled troop's aid, air assaulting into the fight amidst intense ground fire. They quickly inflicted hundreds of casualties upon the PAVN battalion.

On 9 November 1965 3rd Brigade took control of Operation Silver Bayonet and continued the search for the three PAVN regiments suspected to be operating in the Pleiku region. On 14 November elements of 3rd Brigade's 7th Cavalry Regiment air assaulted onto Landing Zone X-Ray in the Ia Drang Valley to conduct a reconnaissance in force in search of the enemy regiments. Soon after securing the LZ, the 7th Cavalry Soldiers began taking intense small arms, mortar, and rocket fire from an enemy force that vastly outnumbered them. The chaotic fighting that followed would be among the most intense of the Vietnam War. After sustaining heavy casualties, 1/7 Cavalry was able to reorganize their units and establish a hasty battalion security perimeter around LZ X-Ray. One of their platoons, however, was cut off from the rest of the battalion, pinned down and trapped amidst a battalion sized PAVN force. The pinned unit, 2nd Platoon of Bravo Company, had suffered heavy casualties, and like the rest of 1/7, would endure multiple enemy attacks throughout the night. 1/7 Cavalry made three separate attempts to rescue the cut off platoon, but all three attempts were met with failure.

Early on 15 November, the 2/5 Cavalry air assaulted onto LZ Victor, approximately 3 km south east of the battle. On foot, they fought their way to LZ X-Ray, where after coordinating with 1/7 Cavalry, they pressed forward in search of the lost platoon. The 2/5 Cavalry rescued the platoon, which had been devastated with casualties, and enabled their recovery back to LZ X-Ray. 2nd Brigade's 2/5 Cavalry and elements of 1/5 Cavalry tied into the defense perimeter at LZ X-Ray and played a vital role in repelling and counter-attacking the enemy force over the next two days.

On 16 November, the battle at LZ X-Ray was effectively over. The PAVN had taken thousands of casualties and was no longer capable of sustaining a fight. 1/7 Cavalry returned to Camp Radcliff while 2/5 Cavalry, 2/7 Cavalry, and a company from 1/5 Cavalry maintained the perimeter at X-Ray. On the following day, all of the remaining units were ordered off of LZ X-Ray in preparation for a heavy bombing campaign in the area. 2nd Brigade's 2/5 Cavalry marched without incident to LZ Columbus. 2/7 Cavalry, with a company of 2nd Brigade's 1/5 Cavalry attached, marched towards LZ Albany. 2–7 Cavalry marched towards LZ Albany in a column, with 1/5's A Company bringing up the rear. Almost immediately after reaching the LZ, the head of the 2/7 Cavalry column was engaged by a massive L-shaped ambush staged by two battalions of PAVN. The ensuing close-quarters battle was fierce and bloody, with both sides taking devastating casualties. After the initial chaos subsided, hasty security perimeters were formed, with 2/7 Cavalry hunkered down on LZ Albany, while A Company 1/5 Cavalry set a small perimeter 700 meters away. The situation was dire for the soldiers at LZ Albany. They were low on ammunition and water, and the intense fire and close proximity of the enemy disrupted resupply and casualty evacuation efforts, as well as indirect fire and air support. 2nd Brigade's B Company, 1/5 Cavalry rushed to the aid of the soldiers at LZ Albany, landing at LZ Columbus and deploying to the battle on foot. Bravo Company fought their way to the A Company, 1/5 Cavalry perimeter and established and secured an LZ from which resupply and evacuation efforts could finally proceed. 2nd Brigade's men continued to repulse PAVN attacks throughout the night. On the morning of 18 November 1965, after 16 hours of continuous contact, the PAVN finally withdrew, U.S. losses in the action were 155 killed or missing. The firefights at LZ X-Ray and LZ Albany would come to be known as the Battle of Ia Drang. While sustaining heavy casualties, the 2nd and 3rd Brigades estimate that they killed more than 1700 PAVN soldiers and destroyed two full regiments of a PAVN division. For its actions during Operation Silver Bayonet, the 1st Cavalry Division earned the first Presidential Unit Citation awarded to a unit in Vietnam.

On 4 January 1966, 2nd Brigade participated in Operation Matador. Along with 1st Brigade, they air assaulted within the Bình Định Province to conduct a search and destroy mission against the PAVN 3rd Division. During this operation the units witnessed enemy soldiers fleeing into Cambodia, confirming for the first time the PAVN's use to sanctuaries in the neighboring country.

On 7 February 1966, 2nd Brigade took part in Operation White Wing, where they again conducted a search and destroy mission targeting the 3rd Division. All three regiments of the 2nd Brigade deployed to the Iron Triangle, a well-fortified defensive position thought to be the regimental headquarters of the PAVN in the Bình Định region. On 6 March 1967 Operation White Wing concluded as a major tactical success. 2nd Brigade maintained constant contact with the enemy over the entirety of the operation. Five of the 3rd Division's nine battalions were rendered combat ineffective and the PAVN temporarily lost its grip on the Bình Định Province.

On 16 May 1966, 2nd Brigade took part in Operation Crazy Horse, a search and destroy mission against the 2nd Viet Cong Regiment in the jungle covered hills between Soui Ca and the Vinh Thanh Valleys. For his heroic actions in support of Operation Crazy Horse, 2nd Brigade's SSG Jimmy G. Stewart was awarded the Medal of Honor.

2nd Brigade next participated in Operation Paul Revere II, where the first and second battalions of the 5th Cavalry Regiment inflicted heavy casualties on an enemy battalion at the Battle of Hill 534.

On 13 September 1966, 2nd Brigade participated on Operation Thayer I, a search and destroy campaign in the Bình Định Province which would involve one of the largest air assaults ever attempted by the 1st Cavalry Division. 2nd Brigade's PFC Billy Lauffer was awarded the Medal of Honor for his heroic actions in support of Operation Thayer I.

On 31 October 1966, 2nd Brigade launched Operation Paul Revere IV, a search and destroy campaign focusing on Chu Pong, the Ia Drang Valley and the Cambodian border area. C Company, 1/5 Cavalry engaged in a fierce battle with a PAVN force vastly outnumbering them. C Company endured catastrophic casualties, but succeeded in driving the enemy from the area and inflicting hundreds of casualties to a PAVN regiment.

Following Operation Paul Revere IV, 2nd Brigade engaged in Operation Thayer II, a search and destroy campaign in the Bình Định Province. When the campaign concluded in early 1967, the 1st Cavalry Division had destroyed two enemy regiments and inflicted more than 1500 enemy casualties.

The 2nd Brigade distinguished itself next in Operation Pershing, which initiated on 13 February 1967. Operation Pershing was a massive search and destroy mission in the northern Bình Định Province, in which the 1st Cavalry Division committed all three of its brigades to the same area for the first time in Vietnam. In April 1967, while in support of Operation Pershing, 2nd Brigade conducted Operation Lejeune in the Marine-controlled Quảng Ngãi Province. The operation was conducted to free up Marines in the Quảng Ngãi area of operations and facilitate their movement further north. It was almost immediately apparent that the enemy in the Quảng Ngãi region was not prepared for the challenges posed by a brigade of air cavalry troopers. The enemy dispersed and hid, and only little and sporadic contact was initiated until 16 April 1967. Operation Lejeune concluded successfully on 22 April 1967, and the 2nd Brigade returned to the Bình Định Province to continue rooting out the deeply entrenched enemy forces there. On 21 January 1968, Operation Pershing was concluded. In 11 months of fighting the division engaged in 18 major battles and numerous minor skirmishes, inflicting over 7000 enemy casualties. Four 2nd Brigade soldiers, Specialist Fourth Class Charles Hagemeister, Specialist Fourth Class George Ingalls, Specialist Fifth Class Edgar McWethy and Specialist Fourth Class Carmel Harvey were awarded the Medal of Honor for their heroic actions in support of Operation Pershing.

On 22 January 1968, the 1st Cavalry Division relocated to the Quảng Trị Province to participate in Operation Jeb Stuart. As a result of the division's relocation for Operation Jeb Stuart, it was in excellent position to respond to the Tet Offensive.

On 31 January 1968 the PAVN and Vietcong conducted a widespread and well-coordinated assaults on towns and cities across South Vietnam. Thousands of PAVN/VC fighters overran the city of Huế, while five battalions of PAVN attacked Quang Tri City. 2nd Brigade's 1/5 Cavalry, alongside the 1/12 Cavalry, quickly responded and moved into the village of Thon an Thai, just east of Quảng Trị City. They launched a heavy aerial rocket attack against the PAVN, forcing them to break off the Quảng Trị attack and disperse. Quảng Trị City was liberated within the next ten days. On 2 February 2 Brigade's 2/12 Cavalry was tasked with sealing off the western approaches to the city of Huế, while the ARVN and Marines cleared out the PAVN/VC forces inside the city. After 25 days of fierce block-by-block fighting, the ARVN/Marine force succeeded in liberating the city. During the battle for Hue, the PAVN/VC suffered more than 8000 casualties.

While the 1st Cavalry Division was repelling the Tet Offensive, the 26th Marine Regiment was taking heavy bombardment and ground attacks at the Khe Sanh Combat Base. On 1 April 1968, the 2nd Brigade, alongside other 1st Cavalry Division elements, conducted Operation Pegasus in order to relieve the Marines at Khe Sanh. The 1st Cavalry Division completed the relief of the Marine units on 10 April and assumed responsibility for the Khe Sanh area of operations. When Operation Pegasus was concluded several days later, more than 1200 enemy fighters had been killed. On 6 May the brigade was deployed back to eastern Quảng Trị Province where it conducted Operation Concordia Square against PAVN units from 8 to 17 May.

On 27 June 1968, 2nd Brigade took the lead in Operation Jeb Stuart III, a search and destroy mission in the Quang Tri Province. They decimated a PAVN infantry battalion at the village of Binh An, inflicting over 200 casualties.

On 1 May 1970, the First Cavalry Division conducted a search and destroy mission in the Fishhook region of Cambodia, in what had previously been an untouched PAVN/VC stronghold. On 8 May, the 2nd Brigade discovered Rock Island East, a munitions dump where they secured more than 6.5 million anti-aircraft rounds, 500,000 rifle rounds, and thousands of rockets.

On 5 May 1971, the 2nd Brigade, 1st Cavalry Division's colors were moved from Vietnam to Fort Hood, Texas, bringing the 2nd Brigade's actions in the Vietnam War to a close. For 68 months 2nd Brigade was in almost constant contact with the enemy.

=== Peace ===
The era from the Vietnam War until the Persian Gulf War was marked by unit reorganization and constant training. In 1979, 2nd Brigade participated in the Return of Forces to Germany (REFORGER) exercise. The brigade deployed to Germany to simulate the defense of Western Europe against a Soviet invasion force. In 1980, the brigade traveled to Fort Irwin, California to participate in Operation DESERT HORSE. There they conducted the largest peacetime field operation to date, participating in six weeks of intense combined arms training and live fire exercises. During this operation the Multiple Integrated Laser Engagement System (MILES) was employed for the first time in training. The 2nd Brigade conducted additional REFORGER exercises in Germany in 1983 and 1987.

=== Desert Shield ===
In the Persian Gulf War, the 2nd Brigade of the 1st Cavalry Division deployed to Saudi Arabia in support of Operation Desert Shield. XVIII Airborne Corps, which included the 1st Cavalry Division, was tasked with defending in depth in order to prevent the seizure of eastern Saudi Arabia by Iraqi forces. The division was designated as corps' counter-attack force.

As the war progressed into the offensive stage, the 1st Cavalry Division's mission changed in order to support the impending invasion of Iraq. In mid-February 1991, prior to the ground invasion of Iraq, the division fought the Battle of Ruqi Pocket, a critical feint designed to make the enemy believe that the main coalition ground attack would occur at the Wadi al-Batin region of the Iraq-Saudi border. On 15 February 1991, the Black Jack Brigade participated in Operation Berm Buster, where they breached the defensive berm between Saudi Arabia and Iraq to feign the initial stages of a ground invasion. Later that night, the Black Jack Brigade participated in Operation Red Storm, an artillery and aviation barrage of Iraqi border targets designed to suggest that the area was being prepped for assault. On 19 February, the 2nd Brigade's Task Force 1–5 Cav conducted Operation Knight Strike, a reconnaissance in force through the Wadi al-Batin, becoming the first coalition unit to enter Iraq. The task force suffered 12 casualties, but successfully accomplished its mission of simulating the reconnaissance efforts for an impending invasion. The feints at the Wadi al-Batin allowed VII Corps and XVIII Airborne Corps to stage themselves to the far west in preparation for the actual invasion on G-Day, 24 February 1991. It also tied up four Iraqi divisions in the Wadi al-Batin region, where the Iraqis were now convinced that the main attack would occur.

On G-Day, 24 February 1991, the Black Jack Brigade conducted Operation Deep Strike. As the VII and XVIII Corps were beginning to mount the main invasion of Iraq to their far west, the Black Jack Brigade pressed into Iraq once more through the Wadi al-Batin and feinted as though they led the main invasion force. The brigade fought throughout the night and following day, fixing four Iraqi divisions and allowing the main invasion force to envelop the enemy from their west flank. With its mission an unqualified success, the Black Jack Brigade withdrew back through the Wadi al-Batin and united with the VII Corps' assaulting force to pursue and destroy the Iraqi Republican Guard in the Basra Region.

In August 1995, the Black Jack Brigade deployed to Kuwait to conduct Operation Intrinsic Action 95–3, a rotational force on force training exercise. The Black Jack soldiers deployed on 48 hours notice, and 2 months ahead of schedule, in response to aggressive actions by Iraq. Following a highly successful training rotation, the brigade redeployed to Fort Hood in November 1995.

=== Peace ===
From 1995 to 1998 the Black Jack Brigade deployed to four National Training Center rotations and Foal Eagle 97 where, as the first fully modernized brigade in the Army, it was the first US Army unit to deploy the M1A2 tank and the M88A2 recovery vehicle outside the continental United States.

=== Bosnia ===
In March 1999, the Black Jack Brigade deployed to Bosnia-Herzegovina in support of Operation Joint Forge as part of Stabilization Force 5 (SFOR 5), a NATO-led multi-national peace keeping force. The Black Jack Brigade conducted a relief in place with the 1st Brigade, 1st Cavalry Division in order to maintain peace and stability in Bosnia-Herzegovina. During a critical period involving the Brcko Implementation Decision and the air war against the Former Republic of Yugoslavia, Black Jack soldiers maintained peace and stability. In October 1999, the brigade returned to Fort Hood, Texas where it served as division ready brigade for the 1st Cavalry Division for seven months

=== Operation Enduring Freedom ===
In November 2001, the Black Jack Brigade Combat Team deployed to Kuwait as a participant in Operation Enduring Freedom as a direct response to the 11 September 2001 terrorist attacks on the United States. The brigade combat team prepared and subsequently deployed 14 days after notification and returned to Fort Hood, Texas in early April 2002.

=== Iraq War ===
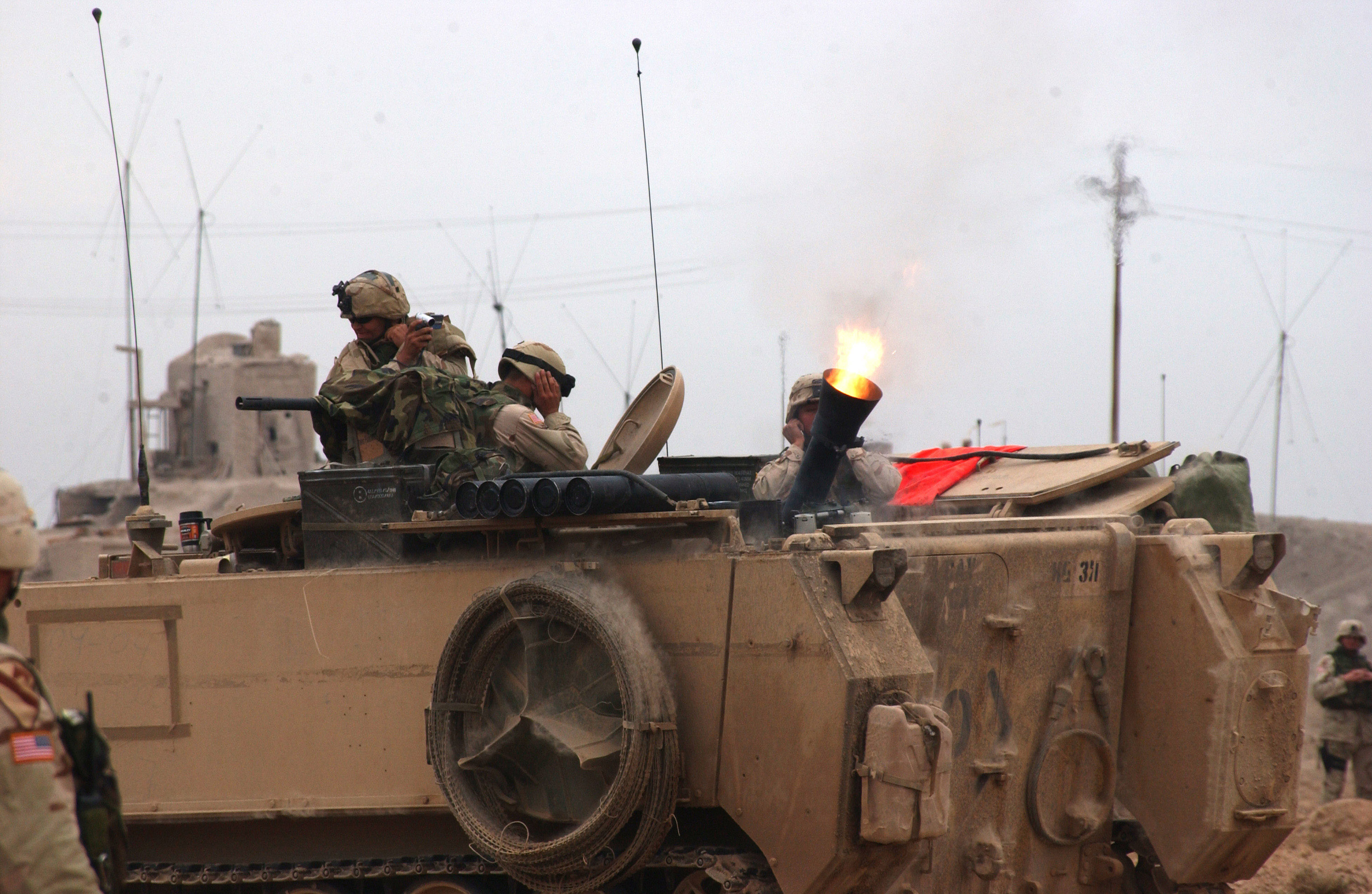
2nd Battalion, 5th Cavalry Regiment soldiers firing a mortar during the Second Battle of Fallujah

The brigade was integral in assisting the 4th Infantry Division deploy to Iraq, as well as preparing 1st Cavalry Division Soldiers and equipment to deploy to Iraq. The brigade stood down for the Iraq deployment in April 2003 and soon followed this mission with a National Training Center rotation in July 2003.

The Black Jack Brigade deployed to Iraq in January 2004 as the lead element for the 1st Cavalry Division in support of Operation Iraqi Freedom I. During the initial deployment, the 2nd Brigade Combat Team was attached to the 1st Armored Division and patrolled Western Baghdad. The brigade fell back under the 1st Cavalry Division in May 2004. During the brigade's Operation Iraqi Freedom I/II 14-month deployment Black Jack soldiers saw action in Western Baghdad, An Najaf, Fallujah, and Northern Babil.

=== Peace ===
Following the deployment, the Black Jack Brigade underwent a transformation to the US Army's modular force structure. As part of the transformation, various assets that had been habitually assigned to the brigade during operations, but assigned to the 1st Cavalry Division as a whole, were made organic to the brigade or were integrated into a brigade special troops battalion. Headquarters, 2nd Brigade, 1st Cavalry Division was reorganized and redesignated on 17 October 2005 as Headquarters, 2nd Brigade Combat Team, 1st Cavalry Division. Headquarters Company, 2nd Brigade, 1st Cavalry Division thereafter had a separate lineage. The reorganized 2nd Brigade Combat Team lost 2–12th Cavalry, but gained an organic cavalry squadron (4th Squadron, 9th Cavalry Regiment), a field artillery battalion (3rd Battalion, 82nd Field Artillery Regiment), and 15th Brigade Support Battalion.

=== Hurricane Katrina ===
During the transformation, the Black Jack Brigade deployed to New Orleans, Louisiana within 48 hours of notification. Under the command of Colonel Bryan Roberts (later Brigadier General Bryan Roberts) in support of the humanitarian relief effort following Hurricane Katrina in the Algiers District. During the deployment, the Black Jack Brigade provided humanitarian and military assistance to the local government and citizens of the Algiers district.

=== Iraq ===
The 2nd Brigade Combat Team returned to Iraq for its second deployment in support of Operation Iraqi Freedom in October 2006 under the command of Colonel Roberts. The brigade assumed responsibility for central and southern Baghdad from the 4th Brigade Combat Team, 4th Infantry Division (Mechanized). On 23 November 2006, the 2nd Brigade Combat Team formally assumed responsibility of the area of operations from the 4th Brigade Combat Team, 4th Infantry Division.

Black Jack battalions assumed a variety of counterinsurgency missions to repair and rebuild Iraq. By the fall of 2007, the brigade enjoyed successes both in combat operations and along all major lines of operation: security, economic, essential services and governance.

In January 2008, the brigade returned to Fort Hood, Texas after 15 months of continuous combat operations and began preparing to return to Iraq in January 2009 to the Sadr City and Adhamiyah neighborhoods of Baghdad as part of Multi-National Division Baghdad. The brigade was diverted at the last minute to support operations in northern Iraq. At the time, Kirkuk was generally considered to be one of the most contentious areas in Iraq. The Black Jack Brigade conducted a partnership ceremony with the Iraqi Police and 12th Iraqi Army Division at Forward Operating Base Warrior on 14 February 2009.

Kirkuk had been the only Iraqi province that did not participate in the January 2009 provincial elections due to outstanding political disputes. The fate of the ethnically diverse province, an unknown combination of primarily Kurdish, Arab, Turkmen and Assyrian ethnicities, had not yet been resolved. The mission of the brigade was to reduce the tension among the northern Iraq Kurds and Arabs and to disrupt the very active insurgency that was limiting forward progress for Kirkuk.

The Black Jack Brigade partnered with Iraqi police, the 12th Iraqi Army Division, and provincial and local civilian leadership to reduce violence by nearly 80 percent in one year. They also worked to significantly improve economic opportunities throughout the province by leveraging projects to create nearly 16,000 jobs in an area that was suffering from approximately 30 percent unemployment. They were replaced by the 1st Brigade Combat Team, 1st Armored Division on 20 December 2009. In March 2010, Kirkuk participated in national elections for the first time since the invasion in 2003, with approximately 79-percent voter participation and no reported acts of violence.

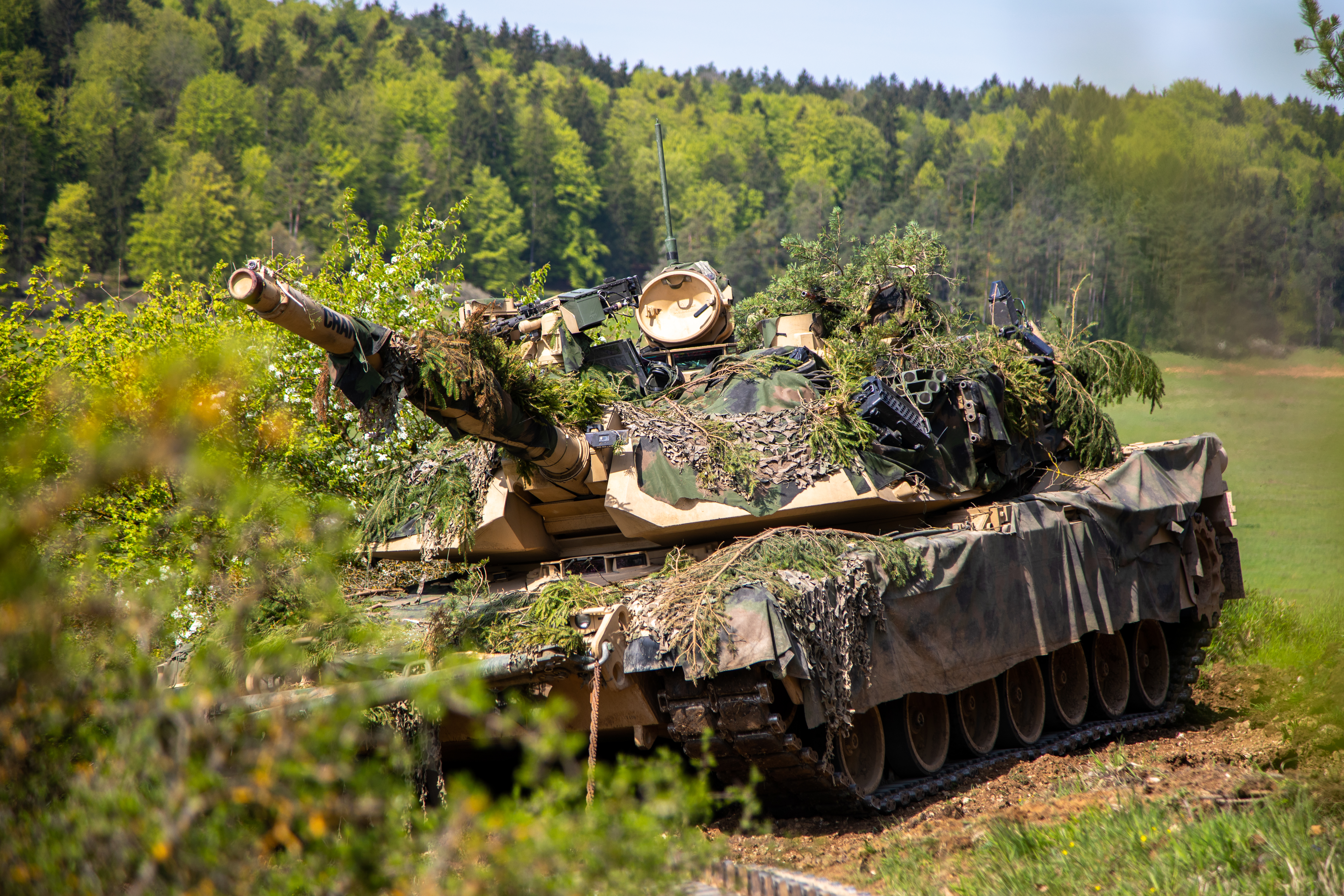
M1A2 Abrams Tank of 2nd Armored Brigade Combat Team, 1st Cavalry Division, during exercise Combined Resolve 18 in Hohenfels, Germany, 2023

=== Afghanistan ===
The brigade also deployed to Afghanistan during 2013–2014.

=== South Korea ===
The brigade was deployed to South Korea June 2015- Feb 2016

=== Germany ===
In October 2019, the Brigade deployed to the European continent in support of Operation Atlantic Resolve. The Brigade is operating in Poland, Lithuania, Romania, Bulgaria, Germany, Hungary, and Georgia.

== Campaign participation credit ==
Conflict
World War II	New Guinea	1943
World War II	Bismarck Archipelago	1943
World War II	Leyte with Arrowhead	1944
World War II	Luzon	1944
Vietnam War	Defense	1965
Vietnam War	Counteroffensive	1965–1966
Vietnam War	Counteroffensive, Phase II	1966–1967
Vietnam War	Counteroffensive, Phase III	1967–1968
Vietnam War	Tet Counteroffensive	1968
Vietnam War	Counteroffensive, Phase IV	1968
Vietnam War	Counteroffensive, Phase V	1968
Vietnam War	Counteroffensive, Phase VI	1968–1969
Vietnam War	Tet 69/Counteroffensive	1969
Vietnam War	Summer–Fall 1969	1969
Vietnam War	Winter–Spring 1970	1969–1970
Vietnam War	Sanctuary Counteroffensive	1970
Vietnam War	Counteroffensive, Phase VII	1970–1971
Gulf War	Defense of Saudi Arabia	1991
Gulf War	Liberation and Defense of Kuwait	1991
Iraq	Iraqi Governance	2004
Iraq	National Resolution	2005
Iraq	Iraqi Surge	2007
Iraq	Iraqi Sovereignty	2009
Afghanistan	Consolidation III	2011
Afghanistan	Transition I	2011–2012
Afghanistan	Transition I	2014

== Unit Decorations ==
Ribbon	Award	Year	Notes
	Presidential Unit Citation (Army)	1965	Pleiku Province
	Valorous Unit Award (Army)	1970	Fish Hook
	Philippine Republic Presidential Unit Citation	1944–1945	Philippines campaign
	Meritorious Unit Commendation (Army)	2003–2011	Iraq
	Republic of Vietnam Cross of Gallantry, with Palm	1965–1969	For service in Vietnam
	Republic of Vietnam Cross of Gallantry, with Palm	1969–1970	For service in Vietnam
	Republic of Vietnam Cross of Gallantry, with Palm	1970–1971	For service in Vietnam
	Republic of Vietnam Civil Action Unit Citation	1969–1970	For service in Vietnam

== See also ==
Facebook Page: http://www.facebook.com/home.php#!/Black.Jack.Brigade.1CD

Twitter Page: https://twitter.com/1stCav2bct

Flickr Page: https://www.flickr.com/photos/63817346@N08/
