= Operation Lejeune =

Part of the Vietnam War (1967)

- Part of the Vietnam War
Date	7–22 April 1967
Location	Đức Phổ District, Quảng Ngãi Province, South Vietnam 14.815°N 108.96°E
Result	US operational success

Belligerents
United States	Viet Cong

Commanders and leaders
MGen John J. Tolson; Lt. Col. Karhohs	

Units involved
2nd Brigade, 1st Cavalry Division	

Casualties and losses
	US body count: 176 killed 127 captured

Operation Lejeune was an operation conducted by the 2nd Brigade, 1st Cavalry Division in Đức Phổ District, Quảng Ngãi Province, South Vietnam, lasting from 7 to 22 April 1967.

== Background ==
The south of Quảng Ngãi Province formed the boundary between I Corps which was the responsibility of the III Marine Expeditionary Force and II Corps which was the responsibility of the U.S. Army. Đức Phổ District, located in the south of Quảng Ngãi Province had been under the control of the Viet Cong (VC) since the beginning of the war. On 28 January the 3rd Battalion, 7th Marines began an operation in the Đức Phổ District, joined in late February by the 1st Battalion, 4th Marines and 2nd Battalion, 5th Marines. By early March only the 3/7th Marines remained in Đức Phổ and it was needed further north in I Corps. On 6 April the 1st Cavalry Division was ordered to move a Battalion and then a Brigade into Đức Phổ to take over from the 3/7th Marines.

The operation, code-named Lejeune after Marine General John A. Lejeune, first required the 11th Aviation Brigade at Landing Zone Two Bits to deploy the 2nd Battalion, 5th Cavalry Regiment into Đức Phổ.

== Operation ==
The operation began at 09:30 on 7 April with the deployment of 2/5 Cavalry at Landing Zone Montezuma. Company B, 8th Engineer Battalion landed shortly afterwards and began to develop the landing zone into an airfield capable of accommodating C-7 Caribou aircraft. 29 CH-54 and 15 CH-47 sorties brought in the heavy equipment required for airfield construction.

By 8 April the remainder of the 2nd Brigade had deployed to LZ Montezuma and Lt. Col. Karhohs assumed operational control.

By 16:30 on 8 April the 1,500-foot (460 m) C-7 strip was operational and work was continuing on extending the strip to make it capable of handling C-123 aircraft. A three-man team from the Pathfinder Platoon of the 11th General Support Aviation Company was soon handling over 1000 aircraft movements per day.

To supplement the aerial resupply, an over the beach supply line was established on the nearby coast named Razor Back Beach with supplies being brought in by LSTs and LCMs.

The VC generally avoided the US forces with only one major engagement on 16 April.

== Aftermath ==
Operation Lejeune officially concluded on 22 April. US forces claimed VC losses were 176 killed and 127 captured. 2nd Brigade, 1st Cavalry Division was relieved at the end of April by the 3rd Brigade, 25th Infantry Division, part of the newly activated Task Force Oregon.
