= George Ingalls =

George Ingalls may refer to:

- George Alan Ingalls (1946–1967), United States Army soldier and Medal of Honor recipient
- George L. Ingalls (1914–2001), American lawyer and politician from New York
