= Robert M. McGovern =

United States Army Medal of Honor recipient

- Born: January 24, 1928; Washington, D.C., U.S.
- Died: January 30, 1951 (aged 23) near Kamyangjan-ni, Korea
- Burial place: Arlington National Cemetery
- Military career
- Allegiance: United States
- Branch: United States Army
- Service years: 1946–1951
- Rank: First Lieutenant
- Units: Company A, 5th Cavalry Regiment, 1st Cavalry Division
- Conflicts: Korean War (DOW)
- Awards: Medal of Honor; Purple Heart

Robert Milton McGovern (1928 – January 30, 1951) was an officer in the United States Army during the Korean War who was posthumously awarded the Medal of Honor for his actions on January 30, 1951.

== Early life ==
McGovern was a Washington D.C. native and a 1946 graduate of St. John's College High School in the District. He joined the Army later that same year.

== Korean War ==
McGovern was hit and wounded as he and his platoon from the 5th Cavalry Regiment came under withering machine gun fire, but he continued up Hill 312, encouraging his men to meet and defeat the Chinese defense. His Medal of Honor recommendation was prepared for him at his men's insistence. His brother, Second Lieutenant Francis Jerome McGovern, was killed in action eleven days later.

When his Medal of Honor was announced in January 1952, Robert's father, J. Halsey McGovern of Washington, created a stir when he refused to accept the award. He also refused to accept the Silver Star posthumously awarded to his second son, Jerome, a member of the 187th Airborne Regiment who was killed in action on February 10, 1951. The senior McGovern's refusal was based on his belief that medals were superfluous. He felt that they did not do justice to all of the heroes of the war in Korea and, as he told reporters, he did not feel that Truman "was fit to confer medals on anyone's sons."

== Medal of Honor citation ==
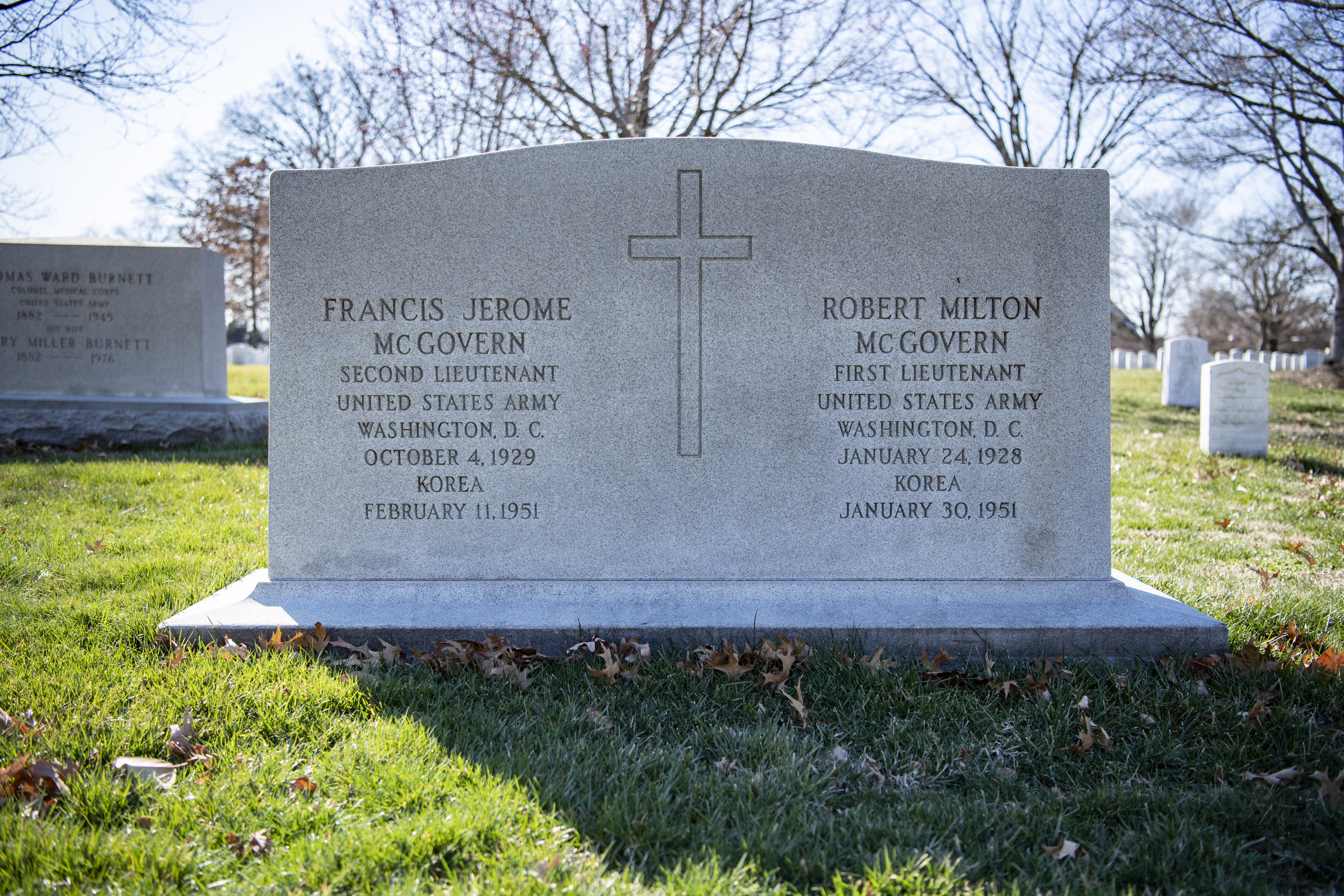
Grave at Arlington National Cemetery

Rank and organization: First Lieutenant, U.S. Army, Company A, 5th Cavalry Regiment, 1st Cavalry Division

Place and date: Near Kimnyangjang-ni 김냥장리 (a small hamlet east of Suwon), Korea, January 30, 1951

Entered service at: Washington, D.C.

Birth: Washington, D.C.

G.O. No.: 2, January 8, 1952.

Citation:

1st Lt. McGovern, a member of Company A, distinguished himself by conspicuous gallantry and intrepidity at the risk of life above and beyond the call of duty in action against an armed enemy of the United Nations. As 1st Lt. McGovern led his platoon up a slope to engage hostile troops entrenched in bunker-type pillboxes with connecting trenches, the unit came under heavy machine gun and rifle fire from the crest of the hill, approximately 75 yards distant. Despite a wound sustained in this initial burst of withering fire, 1st Lt. McGovern, assured the men of his ability to continue on and urged them forward. Forging up the rocky incline, he fearlessly led the platoon to within several yards of its objective when the ruthless foe threw and rolled a vicious barrage of hand grenades on the group and halted the advance. Enemy fire increased in volume and intensity and 1st Lt. McGovern realizing that casualties were rapidly increasing and the morale of his men badly shaken, hurled back several grenades before they exploded. Then, disregarding his painful wound and weakened condition he charged a machine gun emplacement which was raking his position with flanking fire. When he was within 10 yards of the position a burst of fire ripped the carbine from his hands, but, undaunted, he continued his lone-man assault and, firing his pistol and throwing grenades, killed 7 hostile soldiers before falling mortally wounded in front of the gun he had silenced. 1st Lt. McGovern's incredible display of valor imbued his men with indomitable resolution to avenge his death. Fixing bayonets and throwing grenades, they charged with such ferocity that hostile positions were overrun and the enemy routed from the hill. The inspirational leadership, unflinching courage, and intrepid actions of 1st Lt. McGovern reflected utmost glory on himself and the honored tradition of the military services.

== Awards and Decorations ==
Lieutenant McGovern was awarded the following awards for his service

Badge	Combat Infantryman Badge		
1st row	Medal of Honor		Purple Heart
2nd row	World War II Victory Medal	Army of Occupation Medal with 'Japan' clasp	National Defense Service Medal
3rd row	Korean Service Medal with 2 Campaign stars	United Nations Service Medal Korea	Korean War Service Medal Retroactively Awarded, 2003
Unit awards	Presidential Unit Citation		

1st Cavalry Division Insignia

== Legacy ==
The U.S. Army named a camp after McGovern in the Republic of Korea near Ungdam-ni in 1960. It later named another camp after him, Camp McGovern, near the Brcko district, Bosnia.

== See also ==
- List of Korean War Medal of Honor recipients
