= Operation Concordia Square =

Part of the Vietnam War (1968)

- Part of May Offensive of the Vietnam War
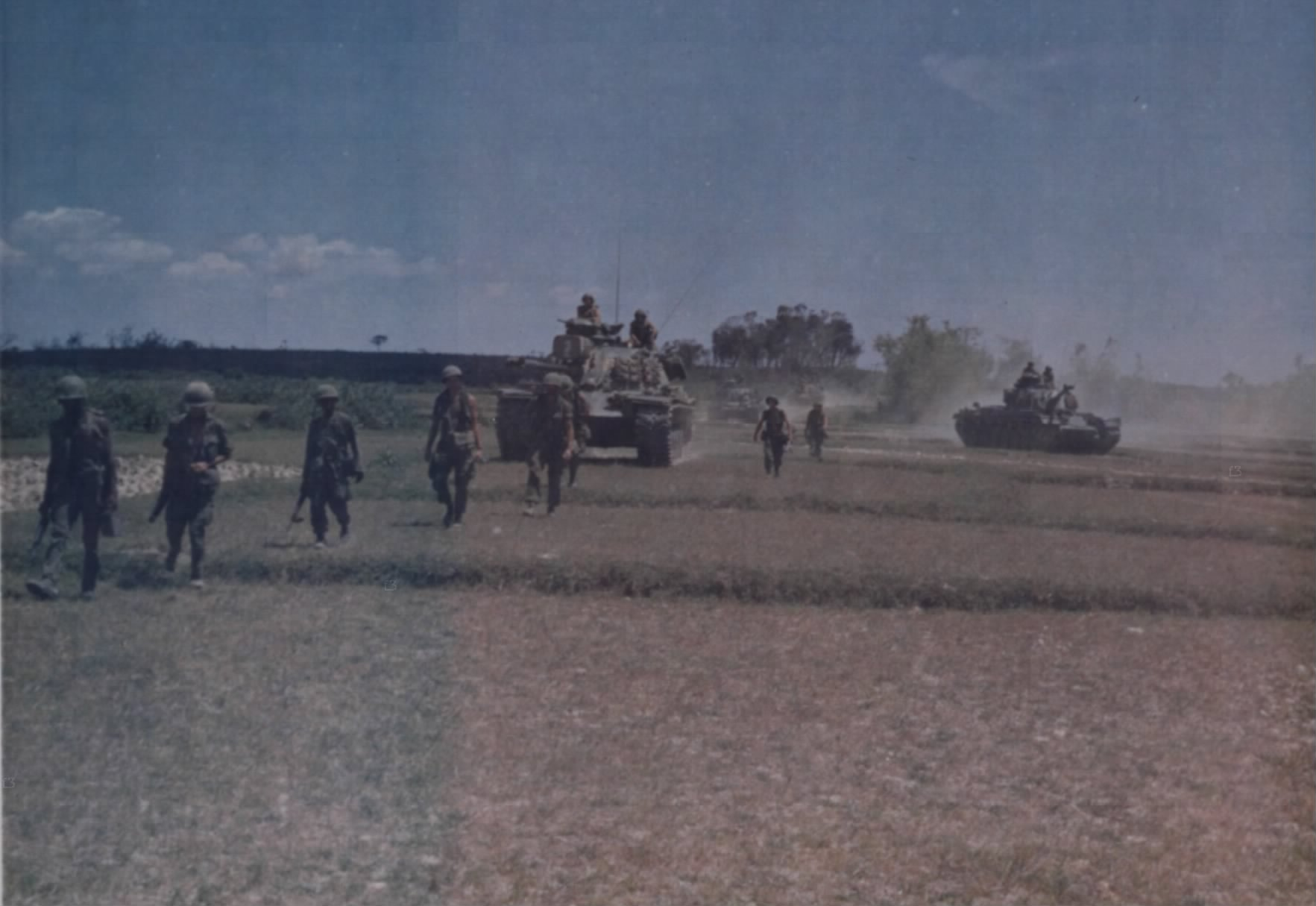
- Company "B" 1st Battalion, 5th Cavalry Regiment supported by Marine M48s search for PAVN, 16 May 1968
Date	8–17 May 1968
Location	Quảng Trị Province, South Vietnam
Result	U.S. victory

Belligerents
United States	North Vietnam

Commanders and leaders
MG Rathvon M. Tompkins; Col Robert N. Mackinnon	

Units involved
2nd Brigade, 1st Cavalry Division	48th Regiment, 320th Division

Casualties and losses
28 killed	U.S. body count: 347 killed 15 captured

Operation Concordia Square was an operation conducted by the United States Army 2nd Brigade, 1st Cavalry Division south of the Vietnamese Demilitarized Zone in Quảng Trị Province. The operation ran from 8 to 17 May 1968.

== Background ==
On the afternoon of 6 May 1968, in the aftermath of the Battle of Dai Do and ongoing fighting with People's Army of Vietnam (PAVN) forces near Nhi Ha, 3rd Marine Division commander Major general Rathvon M. Tompkins requested Provisional Corps commander Lieutenant general William B. Rosson that the 2nd Brigade, 1st Cavalry Division be redeployed from the Scotland II operational area around Khe Sanh Combat Base into the Napoleon/Saline operational area. With few other reserves available to him, the Air Cavalry brigade provided Tompkins, not only additional troops, but a force, with sufficient helicopters, "ideally configured for operations against a retreating enemy force operating in small formations" and to "patrol large areas effectively and move forces quickly to exploit sightings and contact."

At 17:15 on 6 May, the first battalion of the brigade, the 1st Battalion, 5th Cavalry Regiment, landed in a landing zone about 3 km east of the 1st Battalion, 3rd Marines in Truc Kinh. Temporarily, Tompkins placed the Cavalry battalion under the operational control of the 3rd Marine Regiment.

== Operation ==
From 7–8 May, the 1/5th made a careful sweep northwest towards the 1/3 Marines. On the morning of the 9th, the 2nd Battalion, 5th Cavalry, arrived and the 2nd Brigade took over the sector from the Marines. The 3rd Marines relinquished operational control of the 1/5th and the 1/3 Marines returned to its former operational area south of the Cửa Việt River. The Concordia Square tactical area of operations sat between the Army of the Republic of Vietnam 2nd Regiment, 1st Division on the west and the 3rd Marine Regiment in Operation Napoleon/Saline to the east. The 1/5th was responsible for the southern portion of the area of operations and established its command post at Firebase C-1 (16.882°N 107.075°E), while the 2/5th was responsible for the northern portion and established its command post with the Brigade command post at Dong Ha Combat Base.

At 08:00 on 9 May, about 5 km southeast of Firebase Gio Linh (16.875°N 107.093°E), a PAVN force heavily engaged two companies of the 1/5th, cutting off one and preventing the other from coming to its assistance. The brigade quickly deployed 2/5th units into blocking positions north of the action and ordered the remaining two companies of the 1/5th to relieve the embattled companies. In the fast-moving action supported by Marine fixed-wing aircraft and helicopter gunships, PAVN gunners shot down one UH–1H helicopter and hit eight others. By 13:00, the PAVN disengaged leaving behind an estimated 80 dead. 2nd Brigade losses were 16 dead and 52 wounded, most suffered by Company C in the first minutes of the ambush.

On 10 May, following overnight artillery and airstrikes on the ambush area, the 1/5th swept through the area finding 147 PAVN dead and 57 individual and ten crew-served weapons. On the night of 10 May the 2/5th conducted a company-size ambush at MGRS YD 243707 (16.909°N 107.106°E), at 22:05 more than 200 PAVN approached the ambush area and were engaged resulting in 47 PAVN killed and two captured and ten individual weapons captured.

On 11 May Companies A, B and D 1/5th engaged a PAVN force near MGRS YD 243673 (16.878°N 107.105°E) resulting in five U.S. killed and 21 wounded for PAVN losses of 47 killed and four individual and two crew-served weapons captured. 2/5th moved its command post from Dong Ha to Firebase C-1.

On 12 May, after overnight artillery and airstrikes, the 1/5th swept the area finding an additional 35 PAVN dead and eight individual and one crew-served weapons.

On 14 May 2/5 conducted another company-size night ambush near MGRS YD 243693 (16.896°N 107.106°E) resulting in 20 PAVN killed and five individual and one crew-served weapon captured.

On 15 May two companies from 2/5th engaged an estimated PAVN battalion near MGRS YD 248742 (16.94°N 107.11°E). The companies broke contact and artillery and airstrikes were directed onto the area for the next two days, but the battleground wasn't swept due to the termination of the operation.

== Aftermath ==
The operation ended at 11:00 on 17 May and the 2nd Brigade returned to its base at Camp Evans. The 2nd Brigade reported PAVN casualties of 349 dead and 15 captured, while sustaining 28 killed and 117 wounded.
