= William J. Grabiarz =

United States Army Medal of Honor recipient

- Born: March 25, 1925; Buffalo, New York, US
- Died: February 23, 1945 (Aged 19); Manila, the Philippines
- Burial place: Saint Stanislaus Cemetery, Cheektowaga, New York
- Military career
- Allegiance: United States
- Branch: United States Army
- Rank: Private First Class
- Units: Troop E, 5th Cavalry Regiment, 1st Cavalry Division
- Conflicts: World War II
- Awards: Medal of Honor, Bronze Star, Purple Heart, Army Good Conduct Medal, Asiatic-Pacific Campaign Medal, World War II Victory Medal, Philippine Liberation Medal, New York State Conspicuous Service Cross, Distinguished Unit Citation, Combat Infantryman Badge

William J. Grabiarz (March 25, 1925 – February 23, 1945) was a United States Army soldier and a recipient of the United States military's highest decoration—the Medal of Honor—for his actions in World War II.

== Biography ==
Grabiarz joined the Army from his birth city of Buffalo, New York, on April 29, 1943.
By February 23, 1945, he was serving as a private first class in Troop E, 5th Cavalry Regiment, 1st Cavalry Division. On that day, in Manila, the Philippines, he voluntarily braved enemy fire in order to rescue a wounded officer who lay in an exposed position. After being wounded himself and trying unsuccessfully to drag the officer to safety, he used his body to shield the man from hostile fire. Grabiarz was killed by the intense fire, but the officer survived. For these actions, Grabiarz was posthumously awarded the Medal of Honor ten months later, on December 8, 1945.

Grabiarz, aged 19 at his death, was buried in Saint Stanislaus Cemetery, Cheektowaga, New York.

== Medal of Honor citation ==
Private First Class Grabiarz's official Medal of Honor citation reads:

He was a scout when the unit advanced with tanks along a street in Manila, Luzon, Philippine Islands. Without warning, enemy machinegun and rifle fire from concealed positions in the Customs building swept the street, striking down the troop commander and driving his men to cover. As the officer lay in the open road, unable to move and completely exposed to the pointblank enemy fire, Pfc. Grabiarz voluntarily ran from behind a tank to carry him to safety, but was himself wounded in the shoulder. Ignoring both the pain in his injured useless arm and his comrades' shouts to seek the cover which was only a few yards distant, the valiant rescuer continued his efforts to drag his commander out of range. Finding this impossible, he rejected the opportunity to save himself and deliberately covered the officer with his own body to form a human shield, calling as he did so for a tank to maneuver into position between him and the hostile emplacement. The enemy riddled him with concentrated fire before the tank could interpose itself. Our troops found that he had been successful in preventing bullets from striking his leader, who survived. Through his magnificent sacrifice in gallantly giving his life to save that of his commander, Pfc. Grabiarz provided an outstanding and lasting inspiration to his fellow soldiers.

== Military awards ==
Grabiarz' military decorations and awards include:

Badge	Combat Infantryman Badge		
1st Row	Medal of Honor		Bronze Star Medal
2nd Row	Purple Heart	Army Good Conduct Medal	American Campaign Medal
3rd Row	Asiatic-Pacific Campaign Medal with four campaign stars	World War II Victory Medal	Philippine Liberation Medal with three campaign stars
Unit awards	Presidential Unit Citation		Philippine Republic Presidential Unit Citation

== See also ==
- List of Medal of Honor recipients
- List of Medal of Honor recipients for World War II
