= Battle of Binh An =

1968 battle during the Vietnam War

- Part of the Vietnam War
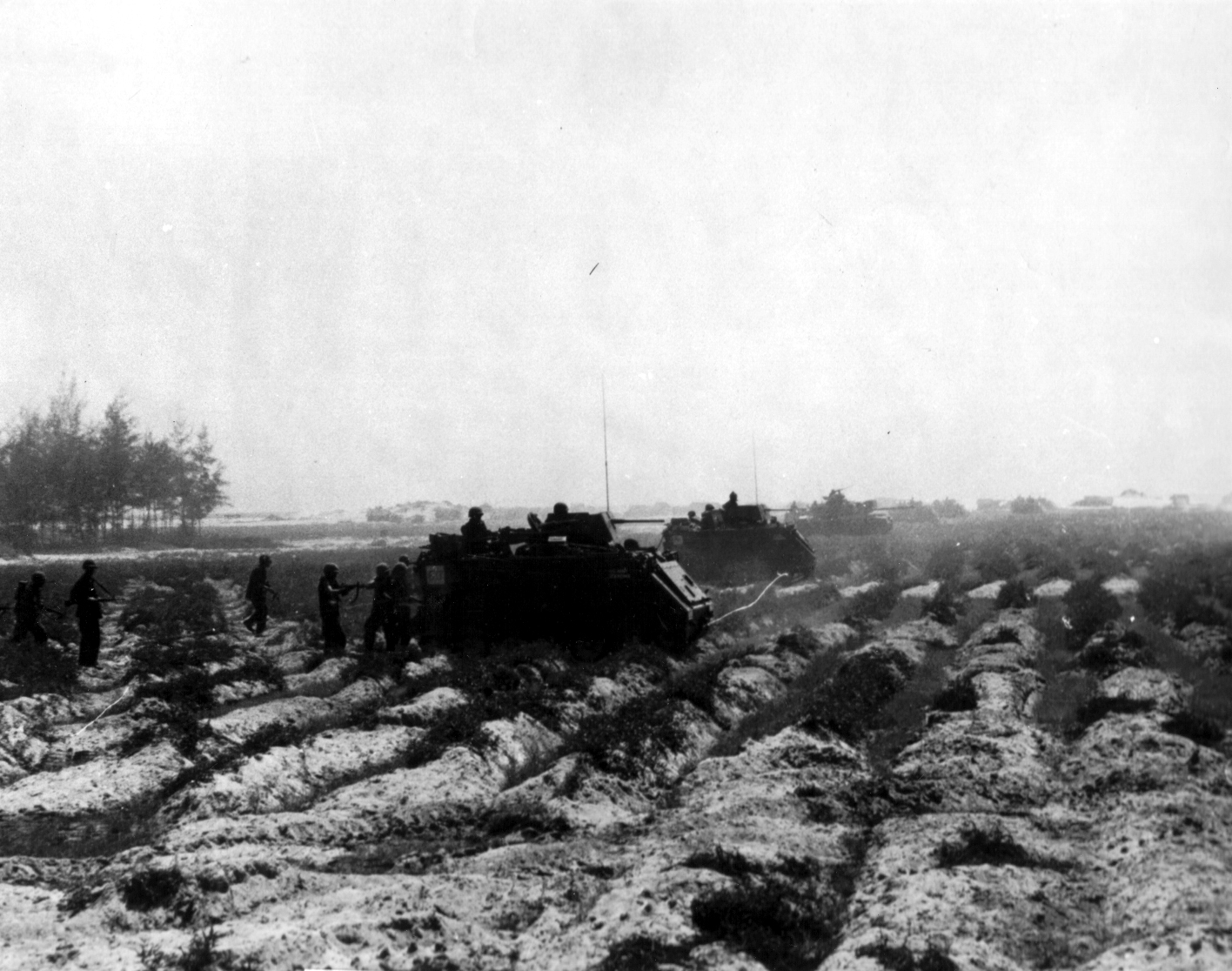
- ACAVs and tanks of Troop B, 3rd Squadron, 5th Cavalry, attack Binh An
Date	27–28 June 1968
Location	Binh An, Quảng Trị province, South Vietnam
Result	US victory

Belligerents
United States	North Vietnam

Commanders and leaders
Lieutenant Colonel Hugh Bartley	Unknown

Units involved
3rd Squadron, 5th Cavalry Regiment; Troop D, 1st Squadron, 9th Cavalry Regiment	K14 Battalion, 812th Regiment

Casualties and losses
3 killed	US body count: 233 killed 44 captured

The Battle of Binh An took place on 27–28 June 1968 in Quảng Trị province during the Vietnam War. The US 3rd Squadron, 5th Cavalry Regiment and Troop D, 1st Squadron, 9th Cavalry Regiment defeated the People’s Army of Vietnam (PAVN) K14 Battalion, 812th Regiment, 324th Division.

== Background ==
In June 1968 the US 3rd Squadron, 5th Cavalry Regiment was performing reconnaissance missions under operational control of the 1st Cavalry Division in Quảng Trị Province, I Corps.

On 26 June, scouts spotted the K4 Battalion from the 812th Regiment in woods 8km east of Quảng Trị. The Army of the Republic of Vietnam 1st Infantry Regiment, 1st Division converged on the area and killed a reported 148 PAVN.

== Battle ==
On 27 June, Troop C, 3/5th Cavalry, with Troop D, 1/9th Cavalry, the ground troop of the air cavalry squadron of the 1st Cavalry Division, had advanced from the northwest to within 150 meters of the village of Binh An (16.848°N 107.246°E), on the South China Sea, 13km north of Quảng Trị. Suddenly, small arms fire and rocket-propelled grenades hit the US forces as several PAVN soldiers withdrew into the village. Both troops began firing to maintain pressure on the PAVN while scout sections from Troop C swung to the north and south of the village to cut off the escape routes. Hundreds of civilians fled from the village as Lieutenant Colonel Hugh Bartley ordered Troops A and B to reinforce the attacking units and start the pile-on. Shortly thereafter, a captured PAVN soldier reported the 300-man K14 Battalion of the 812th Regiment was dug in at Binh An. Realizing he now had a PAVN battalion with its back to the sea, Bartley ordered Troop B to positions north of Binh An. Troop C moved into the center of a horseshoe-shaped cordon along with Troop D, 1/9th Cavalry. By 10:30 the four cavalry troops were in position around Binh An. The South China Sea blocked the PAVN's escape east, and a United States Navy Swift boat was also summoned to seal the seaward escape routes.

Bartley's requests for fire support brought tactical aircraft, aerial rocket artillery and 105mm artillery. The cruiser USS Boston and the destroyers USS O'Brien and USS Edson took station offshore. When Bartley gave the order to open fire the area inside the cordon erupted as hundreds of shells crashed in on the target. A naval observer reported the shelling to be so fierce that PAVN soldiers could be seen diving into the sea to escape. In order to strengthen the cordon and complete the pile-on, Bartley requested the airlift of two infantry companies from the 1st Cavalry Division. The two companies arrived early in the afternoon: Company C, 1/5th Cavalry, reinforced Troop B on the north side, while Company C, 2/5th Cavalry joined Troop A on the south. The supporting fire continued for the rest of the afternoon, and was lifted only long enough for a psychological operations team to fly over Binh An urging the PAVN to surrender. There was no response and the shelling was resumed.

To prevent the PAVN from escaping by night Bartley ordered Troops C and D to attack towards the sea. The cavalrymen assaulted the village but were stopped short by an impassable drainage ditch covered by PAVN fire. Troop B, with its attached infantry dispersed between the tracked vehicles then moved out on line to attack the village from the north. To allow Troop B to use all weapons to its front, Troop A soldiers on the south side of the cordon climbed inside their armored vehicles. Troop B swept forward until its fire began to ricochet off the Troop A vehicles, then turned around and fought its way back to its original blocking positions. Bartley then called for resumption of supporting fire. The attack of Troop B apparently ended any possibility of a mass breakout through the cordon. Thereafter only small groups of PAVN tried to escape by sea; tank searchlights illuminated the beaches, exposing the fugitives. Along the inland sides of the cordon, troops using Night-vision devices between flares occasionally spotted PAVN moving in the dark. Small arms fire stopped them or drove them back. Artillery rounds continued to explode in the village all night.

Morning brought an increase in the shelling, and when the fire was lifted the entire cordon tightened toward the center of Binh An. A short time later the final attack by Troop B was met by no more than scattered resistance. Stunned PAVN soldiers began to emerge from the wreckage and surrender.

== Aftermath ==
As the search of the village progressed it became apparent that the K14 Battalion had been eliminated. Over 200 bodies were found and 44 prisoners were taken. Among the dead were the battalion commander, his staff, all the company commanders and the regimental personnel officer. Three US soldiers were killed.
