= George Alan Ingalls =

United States Army Medal of Honor recipient (1946–1967)

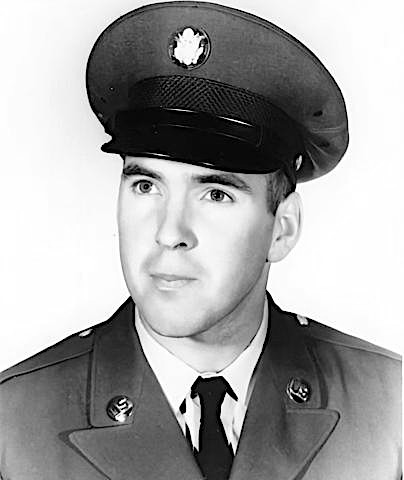
- Born: March 9, 1946; Hanford, California, US
- Died: April 16, 1967 (aged 21) near Đức Phổ, Republic of Vietnam
- Burial place: Pierce Brothers Crestlawn Memorial Park, Riverside, California
- Military career
- Allegiance: United States of America
- Branch: United States Army
- Service years: 1966–1967
- Rank: Specialist Four
- Units: Company A, 2d Battalion, 5th Cavalry Regiment, 1st Cavalry Division (Airmobile)
- Conflicts: Vietnam War †
- Awards: Medal of Honor

George Alan Ingalls (March 9, 1946 – April 16, 1967) was a United States Army soldier and a recipient of the United States military's highest decoration—the Medal of Honor—for his actions in the Vietnam War.

== Biography ==
Ingalls joined the Army from Los Angeles, California, in 1966, and by April 16, 1967, was serving as a specialist four in Company A, 2d Battalion, 5th Cavalry Regiment, 1st Cavalry Division (Airmobile). On that day, near Đức Phổ in the Republic of Vietnam, Ingalls smothered the blast of an enemy-thrown hand grenade with his body, sacrificing his life to protect those around him.

Ingalls, aged 21 at his death, was buried in Pierce Brothers Crestlawn Memorial Park, Riverside, California.

== Medal of Honor citation ==
Specialist Ingalls' official Medal of Honor citation reads:

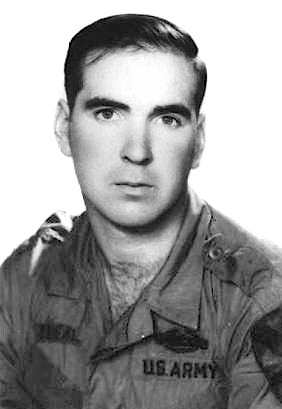
George A. Ingalls, Medal of Honor recipient

For conspicuous gallantry and intrepidity in action at the risk of his life above and beyond the call of duty. Sp4 Ingalls, a member of Company A, accompanied his squad on a night ambush mission. Shortly after the ambush was established, an enemy soldier entered the killing zone and was shot when he tried to evade capture. Other enemy soldiers were expected to enter the area, and the ambush was maintained in the same location. Two quiet hours passed without incident, then suddenly a hand grenade was thrown from the nearby dense undergrowth into the center of the squad's position. The grenade did not explode, but shortly thereafter a second grenade landed directly between Sp4 Ingalls and a nearby comrade. Although he could have jumped to a safe position, Sp4 Ingalls, in a spontaneous act of great courage, threw himself on the grenade and absorbed its full blast. The explosion mortally wounded Sp4 Ingalls, but his heroic action saved the lives of the remaining members of his squad. His gallantry and selfless devotion to his comrades are in keeping with the highest traditions of the military service and reflects great credit upon Sp4 Ingalls, his unit, and the U.S. Army.

== See also ==
- List of Medal of Honor recipients
- List of Medal of Honor recipients for the Vietnam War
