= Edgar Lee McWethy Jr. =

US Army soldier (1944-1967)

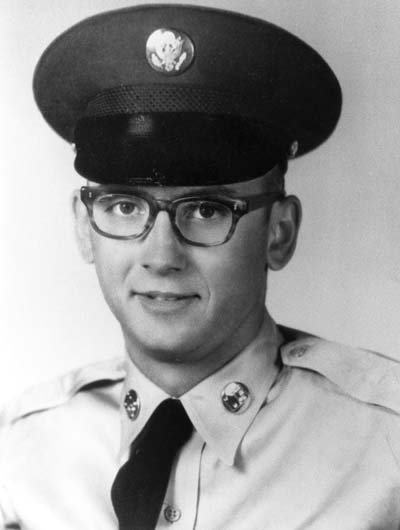
- Specialist Five Edgar McWethy
- Born: November 22, 1944; Leadville, Colorado, US
- Died: June 21, 1967 (aged 22); Binh Dinh Province, Republic of Vietnam
- Burial place: Pence Cemetery, Baxter Springs, Kansas
- Military career
- Allegiance: United States
- Branch: United States Army
- Service years: 1964–1967
- Rank: Specialist Five
- Units: 5th Cavalry Regiment, 1st Cavalry Division (Airmobile)
- Conflicts: Vietnam War †
- Awards: Medal of Honor; Purple Heart

Edgar Lee McWethy Jr. (November 22, 1944 – June 21, 1967) was a United States Army soldier and a recipient of the United States military's highest decoration—the Medal of Honor—for his actions in the Vietnam War.

== Biography ==
McWethy joined the Army from Denver, Colorado in 1964, and by June 21, 1967, was a Specialist Five serving as a combat medic in Company B, 1st Battalion, 5th Cavalry Regiment, 1st Cavalry Division (Airmobile). During a firefight on that day, in Binh Dinh Province, Republic of Vietnam, McWethy repeatedly exposed himself to enemy fire to treat his wounded comrades despite being wounded three times himself. He continued to help his fellow soldiers until suffering a fourth and fatal wound.

McWethy, aged 22 at his death, was buried in Pence Cemetery, Baxter Springs, Kansas.

The McWethy Troop Medical Clinic at Fort Sam Houston and Fort Jackson, South Carolina, are named in his honor.

== Medal of Honor citation ==
Specialist McWethy's official Medal of Honor citation reads:

For conspicuous gallantry and intrepidity in action at the risk of his life above and beyond the call of duty. Serving as a medical aidman with Company B, Sp5 McWethy accompanied his platoon to the site of a downed helicopter. Shortly after the platoon established a defensive perimeter around the aircraft, a large enemy force attacked the position from 3 sides with a heavy volume of automatic weapons fire and grenades. The platoon leader and his radio operator were wounded almost immediately, and Sp5 McWethy rushed across the fire-swept area to their assistance. Although he could not help the mortally wounded radio operator, Sp5c. McWethy's timely first aid enabled the platoon leader to retain command during this critical period. Hearing a call for aid, Sp5 McWethy started across the open toward the injured men, but was wounded in the head and knocked to the ground. He regained his feet and continued on but was hit again, this time in the leg. Struggling onward despite his wounds, he gained the side of his comrades and treated their injuries. Observing another fallen rifleman lying in an exposed position raked by enemy fire, Sp5 McWethy moved toward him without hesitation. Although the enemy fire wounded him a third time, Sp5 McWethy reached his fallen companion. Though weakened and in extreme pain, Sp5 McWethy gave the wounded man artificial respiration but suffered a fourth and fatal wound. Through his indomitable courage, complete disregard for his safety, and demonstrated concern for his fellow soldiers, Sp5 McWethy inspired the members of his platoon and contributed in great measure to their successful defense of the position and the ultimate rout of the enemy force. Sp5 McWethy's profound sense of duty, bravery, and his willingness to accept extraordinary risks in order to help the men of his unit are characteristic of the highest traditions of the military service and reflect great credit upon himself and the U.S. Army.

== See also ==
- List of Medal of Honor recipients
- List of Medal of Honor recipients for the Vietnam War
