= Billy Lane Lauffer =

- Army Medal of Honor
- Born: October 20, 1945; Murray, Kentucky, US
- Died: September 21, 1966 (aged 20) near Bon Son, Binh Dinh Province, Republic of Vietnam
- Burial place: Murray Memorial Gardens, Murray, Kentucky
- Military career
- Allegiance: United States
- Branch: United States Army
- Service years: 1962–1966
- Rank: Private First Class
- Units: Company C, 2nd Battalion, 5th Cavalry Regiment, 1st Cavalry Division
- Conflicts: Vietnam War †
- Awards: Medal of Honor; Purple Heart

Billy Lane Lauffer (October 20, 1945 – September 21, 1966) was a United States Army soldier and a recipient of the United States military's highest decoration—the Medal of Honor—for his actions in the Vietnam War.

In honor of him, Billy Lane Lauffer Middle School was built in 2005 in Tucson, Arizona.

== Biography ==
Lauffer joined the Army from Phoenix, Arizona in 1962, and by September 21, 1966, was serving as a private first class in Company C, 2nd Battalion, 5th Cavalry Regiment, 1st Air Cavalry Division. During a firefight on that day, near Bon Son in Binh Dinh Province, Republic of Vietnam, he single-handedly charged an enemy emplacement, creating a diversion so his comrades could move their wounded to safety. Mortally wounded in the charge, Lauffer was posthumously awarded the Medal of Honor for his actions.

Lauffer, aged 20 at his death, was buried at Murray Memorial Gardens in his birth city of Murray, Kentucky.

== Medal of Honor citation ==
Private Lauffer's official Medal of Honor citation reads:

For conspicuous gallantry and intrepidity in action at the risk of his life above and beyond the call of duty. Pfc. Lauffer's squad, a part of Company C, was suddenly struck at close range by an intense machine gun crossfire from 2 concealed bunkers astride the squad's route. Pfc. Lauffer, the second man in the column, saw the lead man fall and noted that the remainder of the squad was unable to move. Two comrades, previously wounded and being carried on litters, were lying helpless in the beaten zone of the enemy fire. Reacting instinctively, Pfc. Lauffer quickly engaged both bunkers with fire from his rifle, but when the other squad members attempted to maneuver under his covering fire, the enemy fusillade increased in volume and thwarted every attempt to move. Seeing this and his wounded comrades helpless in the open, Pfc. Lauffer rose to his feet and charged the enemy machine gun positions, firing his weapon and drawing the enemy's attention. Keeping the enemy confused and off balance, his 1-man assault provided the crucial moments for the wounded point man to crawl to a covered position, the squad to move the exposed litter patients to safety, and his comrades to gain more advantageous positions. Pfc. Lauffer was fatally wounded during his selfless act of courage and devotion to his fellow soldiers. His gallantry at the cost of his life served as an inspiration to his comrades and saved the lives of an untold number of his companions. His actions are in keeping with the highest traditions of military service and reflect great credit upon himself, his unit, and the U.S. Army.

== See also ==
- List of Medal of Honor recipients for the Vietnam War
