= Đức Phổ Base Camp =

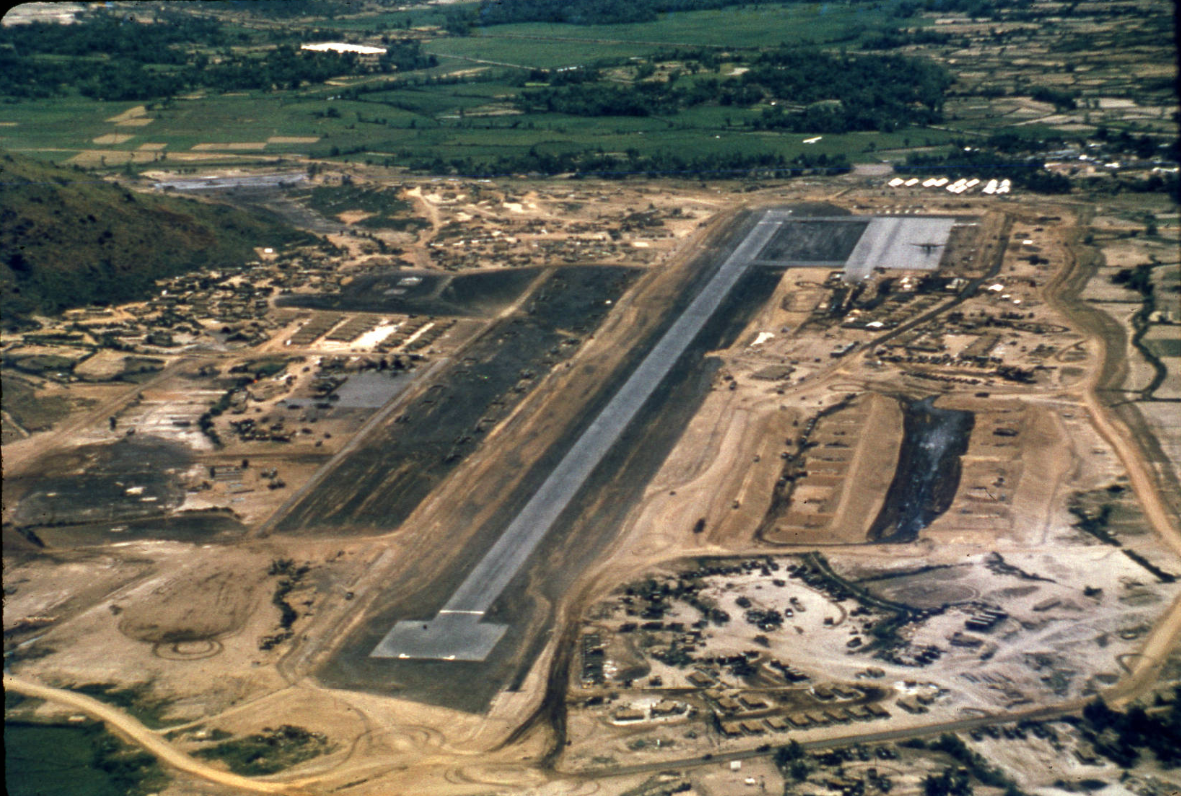
- Đức Phổ, 13 July 1967

Site information
- Type: Marines/Army
- Condition: abandoned

Location
- Coordinates: 14.815°N 108.96°E

Site history
- Built: 1966
- In use: 1966-71
- Battles/wars: Vietnam War

Garrison information
- Occupants: 1st Marine Division; 101st Airborne Division; 3rd Brigade, 25th Infantry Division

Đức Phổ Airfield
- IATA: none; ICAO: none

Summary
- Elevation AMSL: 36 ft (11 m)
- Interactive map of Đức Phổ Airfield

Runways
Direction	Length		Surface
Direction	ft	m	Surface
	3,600	1,097	PSP

Đức Phổ Base Camp (also known as Đức Phổ Airfield, LZ Bronco, LZ Montezuma and Núi Đàng) is a former U.S. Marine Corps and U.S. Army base in the Đức Phổ District, Quảng Ngãi Province Vietnam.

== History ==
=== 1966-71 ===
The base was located along Highway 1 approximately midway between Da Nang and Qui Nhơn.

LZ Montezuma was originally established by the U.S. Marine Corps' Task Force X-Ray and the 2nd Battalion 5th Marines and 3rd Battalion 7th Marines were based here until 1 April 1967 when they were replaced by the 1st Cavalry Division in Operation Lejeune.

The 1st Cavalry Division built a runway capable of landing de Havilland Canada C-7 Caribou aircraft at the base in early April. At the end of April the 1st Cavalry Division handed over the base to 3rd Brigade, 25th Infantry Division comprising:

- 1st Battalion, 14th Infantry
- 1st Battalion, 35th Infantry
- 2nd Battalion, 35th Infantry

On 1 August 1967 the 3rd Brigade became part of the 4th Infantry Division, while the 4th Infantry Division's 3rd Brigade at Dầu Tiếng Base Camp became part of the 25th Infantry Division.

Đức Phổ served as the base for the 101st Airborne Division from June–November 1967.

C-7 Caribou 62-4161 plunges to earth after being struck by US Army artillery, 3 August 1967. Photo by Hiromichi Mine.

Other units stationed at Đức Phổ included:

- 2nd Battalion, 11th Artillery (April 1967-January 1968)
- 6th Battalion, 11th Artillery (December 1967-September 1971)
- 3rd Battalion, 1st Infantry (December 1967-June 1971)
- 198th Light Infantry Brigade (October–November 1967)

On 3 August 1967 a C-7 Caribou (#62-4161) on approach to Đức Phổ was hit by an outgoing 155mm shell which severed its tail section causing the aircraft to crash killing all 3 crewmen. The falling C-7 was photographed by Hiromichi Mine just before impact.

LZ Bronco at Duc Pho became the base camp for Task Force Barker, an element of the 11th Brigade, Americal Division by 1968. Task Force Barker was named for Lt. Col. Frank Barker, its commander. Bronco was located near the southern border of I Corps, the northernmost corps in Vietnam, a particularly difficult area of operations. The operation that spawned the My Lai Massacre was actually launched from LZ Dottie to the north. The area was a nightmare for soldiers and their commanders because of the Viet Cong's habit of hiding in/infiltrating local villages, especially retreating there at night, hoping to be absorbed into the local population and become unrecognizable. One contributor to My Lai was the difficulty of distinguishing between civilians and VC infiltrators, and another was combat stresses created by events that followed the Tet offensive, including a situation where Lt. Calley's platoon was ordered to cross a known minefield before it had been cleared. Another was orders developed from apparently vague or even faulty intelligence indicating that My Lai was a Viet Cong stronghold. These factors ultimately led to the Massacre, although the mass killing was participated in by fewer than half the platoon.

== Current use ==
The base is abandoned and turned over to farmland, light industry and housing.
