= Charles C. Hagemeister =

United States Army Medal of Honor recipient (1946–2021)

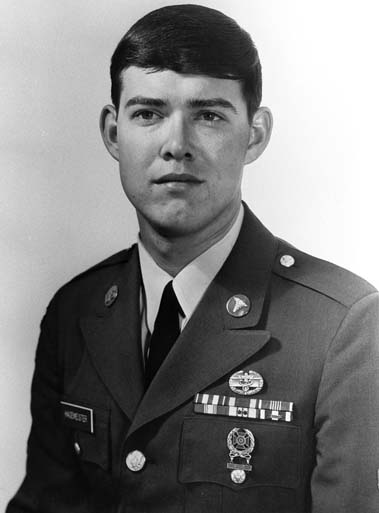
- Born: Charles Chris Hagemeister; August 21, 1946; Lincoln, Nebraska
- Died: May 19, 2021 (aged 74); Leavenworth, Kansas
- Military career
- Allegiance: United States
- Branch: United States Army
- Service years: 1966–1990
- Rank: Lieutenant colonel
- Units: 5th Cavalry Regiment, 1st Cavalry Division (Air mobile)
- Conflicts: Vietnam War
- Awards: Medal of Honor; Silver Star

Charles Chris Hagemeister (August 21, 1946 – May 19, 2021) was a United States Army officer and a recipient of the Medal of Honor, the United States military's highest decoration, for his actions in the Vietnam War.

== Early life ==
Hagemeister was born in Lincoln, Nebraska, on August 21, 1946. He was the youngest of four siblings in his family. He attended Lincoln Southeast High School, before studying at the University of Nebraska–Lincoln.

== Vietnam War ==
Hagemeister was drafted into the United States Army from his birth city of Lincoln, Nebraska, in May 1966, during a break from his university studies. By March 20 of the following year, he was serving as a specialist four in Headquarters and Headquarters Company, 1st Battalion, 5th Cavalry Regiment, 1st Cavalry Division (Air mobile). He was previously serving as a medic. During a firefight on that day, in Binh Dinh Province, Republic of Vietnam, Hagemeister repeatedly exposed himself to enemy fire in order to aid wounded comrades. He was subsequently promoted to specialist five and awarded the Medal of Honor for his actions.

== Post-war life ==
Upon his return from military service, Hagemeister became a commissioned officer. He reached the rank of lieutenant colonel before retiring in June 1990. He also served on the board of the Congressional Medal of Honor Society.

== Personal life ==
Hagemeister was married to Barbara until his death. Together, they had two children.

Hagemeister died on May 19, 2021, at Saint John Hospital in Leavenworth, Kansas. He was 74, and was one of only two surviving Medal of Honor recipients from Nebraska (the other being Bob Kerrey). He is buried at Leavenworth National Cemetery.

== Medal of Honor citation ==
Medal of Honor

Specialist Hagemeister's Medal of Honor citation reads:

For conspicuous gallantry and intrepidity in action at the risk of his life above and beyond the call of duty. While conducting combat operations against a hostile force, Sp5c. Hagemeister's platoon suddenly came under heavy attack from 3 sides by an enemy force occupying well concealed, fortified positions and supported by machine guns and mortars. Seeing 2 of his comrades seriously wounded in the initial action, Sp5c. Hagemeister unhesitatingly and with total disregard for his safety, raced through the deadly hail of enemy fire to provide them medical aid. Upon learning that the platoon leader and several other soldiers also had been wounded, Sp5c. Hagemeister continued to brave the withering enemy fire and crawled forward to render lifesaving treatment and to offer words of encouragement. Attempting to evacuate the seriously wounded soldiers, Sp5c. Hagemeister was taken under fire at close range by an enemy sniper. Realizing that the lives of his fellow soldiers depended on his actions, Sp5c. Hagemeister seized a rifle from a fallen comrade, killed the sniper, 3 other enemy soldiers who were attempting to encircle his position and silenced an enemy machine gun that covered the area with deadly fire. Unable to remove the wounded to a less exposed location and aware of the enemy's efforts to isolate his unit, he dashed through the fusillade of fire to secure help from a nearby platoon. Returning with help, he placed men in positions to cover his advance as he moved to evacuate the wounded forward of his location. These efforts successfully completed, he then moved to the other flank and evacuated additional wounded men despite the fact that his every move drew fire from the enemy. Sp5c. Hagemeister's repeated heroic and selfless actions at the risk of his life saved the lives of many of his comrades and inspired their actions in repelling the enemy assault. Sp5c. Hagemeister's indomitable courage was in the highest traditions of the U.S. Armed Forces and reflect great credit upon himself.

== See also ==
- List of Medal of Honor recipients for the Vietnam War
