= 5th Cavalry Regiment =

United States Army unit

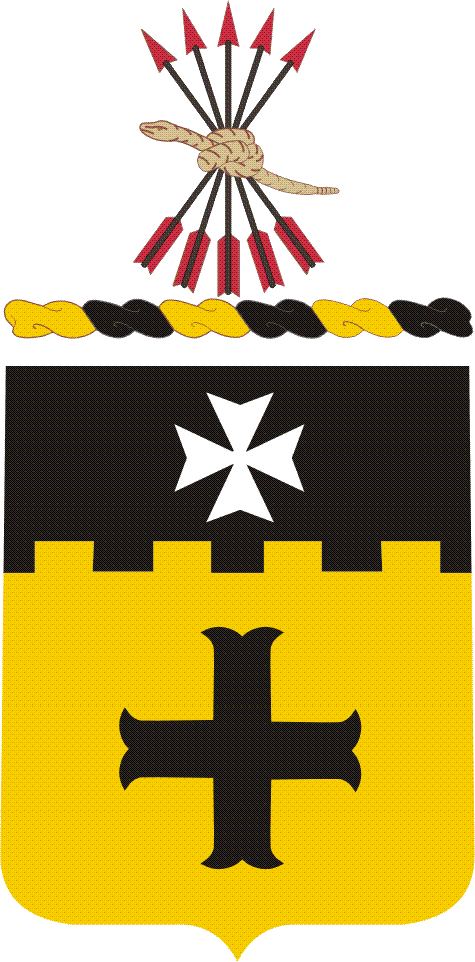
- 5th Cavalry Regiment coat of arms
- Active: 1855–
- Country: United States of America
- Branch: Regular Army
- Type: Cavalry
- Nicknames: "Black Knights, Lancers"
- Mottos: Loyalty&Courage
- Colors: Yellow&Black
- Engagements: Indian Wars; American Civil War; Spanish–American War; Philippine–American War; Border War; Mexican Expedition; World War II; Korean War; Vietnam War; War in Southwest Asia; Iraq War

Commanders
- Notable commanders: Albert Sidney Johnston; Robert E. Lee; Wesley Merritt; George H. Cameron; Gordon B. Rogers; George S. Patton; Eric Shinseki

Insignia
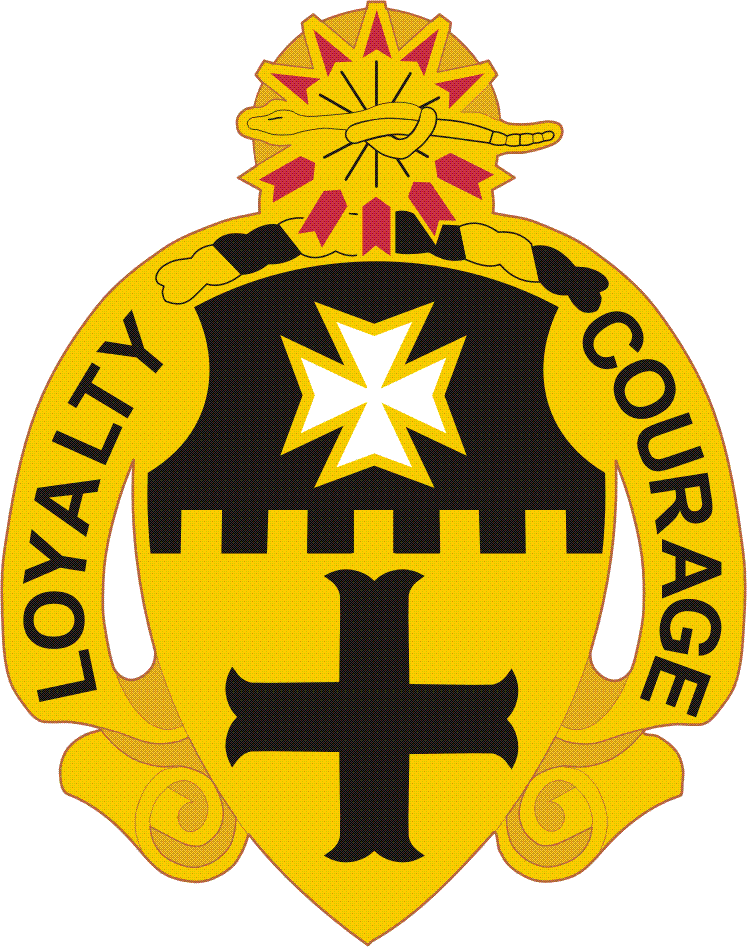
- Regimental distinctive insignia

The 5th Cavalry Regiment ("Black Knights") is a historical unit of the United States Army that began its service on March 3, 1855, as the Second Cavalry Regiment. On August 3, 1861, it was redesignated as the 5th Cavalry Regiment following an act of Congress directing "that the two regiments of dragoons, the regiment of mounted riflemen, and the two regiments of cavalry shall hereafter be known and recognized, as the first, second, third, fourth, and fifth regiments of cavalry respectively..." and continues in modified organizational format in the U.S. Army.

== Formation and the frontier ==
The war with Mexico had resulted in adding a vast territory to our national domain, and the government was bound, in the interests of civilization, to open this immense area to settlement. California, because of her rich deposits of gold, soon solved the problem without requiring much assistance from the army. While the Indians were numerous in that state, they were not warlike, and they readily conformed themselves to the new order of affairs. But the country between the Missouri River and California was an almost unknown territory, occupied by powerful and warlike tribes of Indians...the army was to lead in the work of civilization, and the army was also to be an honest and impartial arbiter standing between the pioneers and the Indians, compelling both to respect the law and obey it, or to disobey it at their peril.

The size of the regular U.S. Army remained the same since prior to the Mexican War (1846–1848), but it's "duty...had been nearly doubled." As a consequence, General Winfield Scott requested from Congress, that additional forces be added to the Army, and in 1855 Congress authorized the 1st and 2nd Cavalry Regiments to be added to the U.S. Army. On 3 March 1855, the 2nd Cavalry Regiment (later to be known as the 5th Cavalry Regiment) was activated in Louisville, Kentucky with troopers drawn from the states of Alabama, Maryland, Missouri, Indiana, Kentucky, Pennsylvania, Ohio, and Virginia. Each company rode mounts of a certain color, so a trooper's company could easily be identified in the confusion of battle, and so that the regiment appeared more splendid and organized during dress parades. Company A rode grays, Companies B and E rode sorrels, Companies C, D, F, and I had bays, Companies G and H rode browns, and Company K rode roans.

The following were the initial officers of the regiment. Many rose to high rank during the American Civil War.

Colonel (COL): Albert Sidney Johnston

Lt. Colonel (LTC): Robert Edward Lee

Majors (MAJ): William Joseph Hardee; George Henry Thomas

Captains (CPT): Earl Van Dorn; Edmund Kirby Smith; James Oakes; Innis Newton Palmer; George Stoneman; Albert G. Brackett; Charles Jarvis Whiting

First Lieutenants (1LT): Nathan G. Evans; Richard Woodhouse Johnson; Joseph H. McArthur; Charles William Field; Kenner Garrard; Walter H. Jennifer, William B. Royall

Second Lieutenants (2LT): George Blake Cosby; William Warren Lowe; John Bell Hood; Junius Brutus Wheeler; A. Parker Porter, Wesley Owens; James Patrick Major; Fitzhugh Lee

After receiving cavalry training at Jefferson Barracks, Missouri, the regiment, under COL Albert Sidney Johnston, began riding out to Fort Belknap, Texas. The journey to the fort was long and hard; the 700 men and 800 horses of the 2nd Cavalry marched over the Ozark Mountains, through Arkansas, and into Indian Territory until they arrived on 27 December 1855. COL Johnston immediately received orders to set up Headquarters along with Companies B, C, D, G, H, and I at Fort Mason, Texas. Arriving on 14 January 1856, the men arrived at the post (which had been abandoned for two years) and immediately began work repairing it. On 22 February 1856, Company C of the 2nd Cavalry, under the command of Captain James Oaks, engaged the Waco Indians in their first battle just west of Fort Terrett, Texas.

In July 1857, LTC Robert E. Lee arrived at Fort Mason to take command of the 2nd Cavalry Regiment. That same month, 2LT John Bell Hood led a company of the 2nd Cavalry into the Texas frontier. Near the Devils River, the patrol spotted a band of Comanche warriors holding a white flag of truce, and 2LT Hood went to speak with them. The warriors dropped their white flag and began lighting fires to carefully placed burn piles in order to provide a smoke screen. 30 more Indians, hiding within 10 paces of the Cavalry troopers, began attacking with arrows and guns. The cavalrymen charged and engaged in hand-to-hand fighting, but were forced to withdraw under the cover of revolver fire in the face of two-to-one odds. 2LT Hood was wounded by an arrow through the left hand in this engagement, but continued to serve with the 2nd Cavalry.

On 15 February 1858, MAJ William J. Hardee was instructed to proceed from Fort Belknap with Companies A, F, H, and K to Otter Creek, Texas and establish a Supply Station. On 29 February, they came upon a large encampment of Comanche Indians near Wichita Village. In July 1858, the entire regiment assembled at Fort Belknap in anticipation of joining Johnston in Utah to subjugate rebellious Mormons. Their orders were rescinded and they instead formed a striking force, the "Wichita Expedition," against the Comanche. Led by MAJ Earl Van Dorn, four companies trapped and defeated a sizable force of Comanches on 1 October at the Wichita Village Fight, and followed it up on 13 May 1859, with a similar victory at the Battle of Crooked Creek in Kansas. During this period (1858–1861), the regiment fought in some forty engagements against the Apaches, Bannocks, Cheyennes, Comanches, Kiowas, Utes and other tribes along with Mexican banditos.

== American Civil War ==
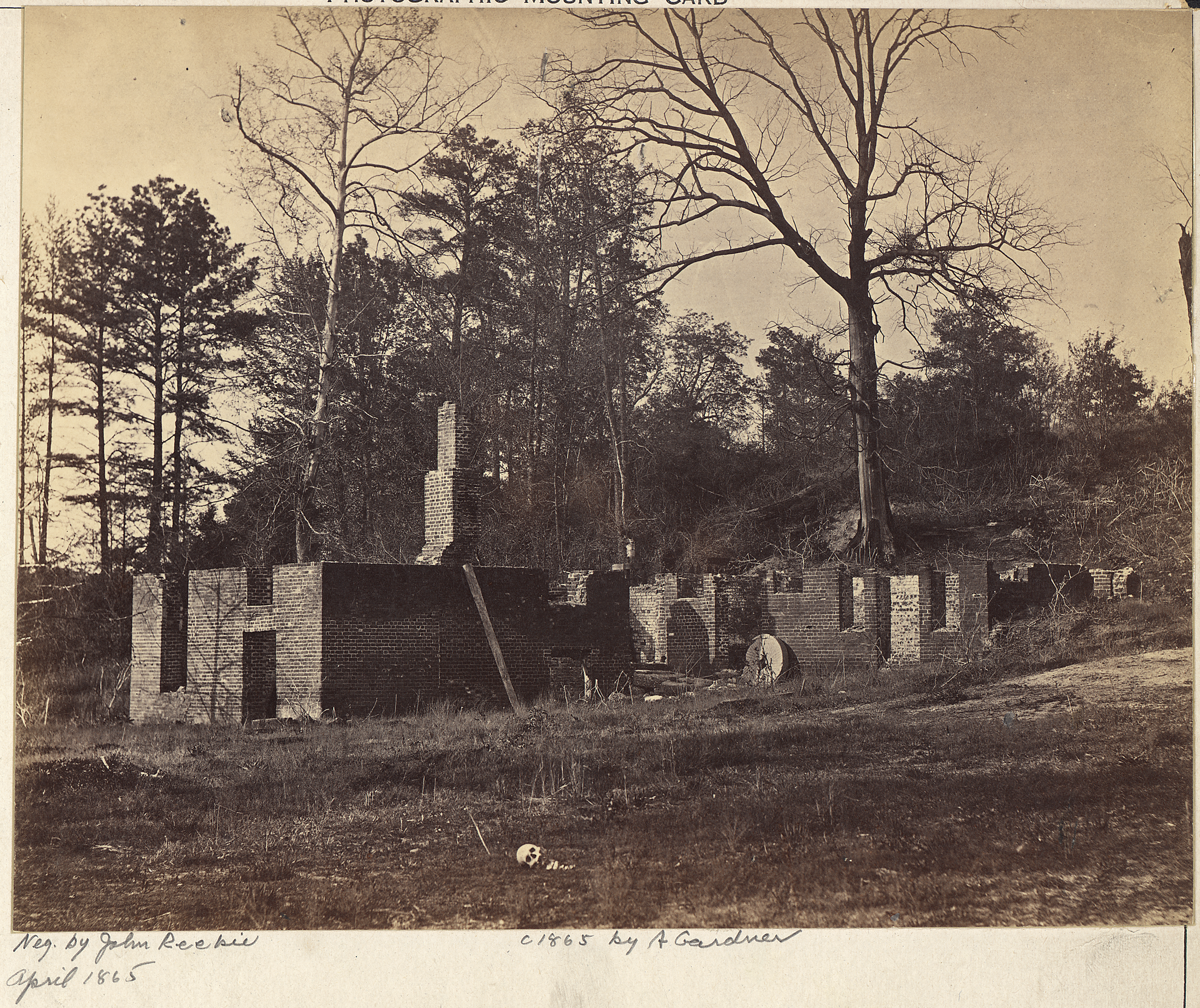
April 1865 photograph of ruins of Gaines Mills Va

John Bell Hood

Early in 1861, the regiment went to Carlisle Barracks, where the officers and men loyal to the South left the regiment to serve in the Confederate States Army. Lieutenant Colonel Robert E. Lee was replaced by Lt. Col. George Henry Thomas. The regiment was rebuilt with new officers and recruits loyal to the Union and was assigned to the Army of the Potomac under the command of General George McClellan. On 21 July 1861, the regiment participated in its first battle of the American Civil War, the First Battle of Bull Run; it was the last action in which they would be called the "2nd Cavalry." In the summer of 1861, all regular mounted regiments were re-designated as "cavalry", and being last in seniority among the existing regiments, the regiment was re-designated as the 5th United States Cavalry. During the Civil War, the regiment fought at the Battle of Gaines's Mill, the Battle of Fairfax Courthouse, the Battle of Williamsport, the Battle of Martinsburg, the Battle of Gettysburg, the Battle of Wilderness, the Battle of Aiken, and the Shenandoah Valley Campaign, among many others. The 5th Cavalry's most notable action came at Gaines Mills, when the regiment charged a Confederate division under command of a former comrade, General John Bell Hood. The regiment suffered heavy casualties in the battle, but their attack saved the Union artillery from annihilation. This battle is commemorated on the regimental crest by the cross moline, in the yellow field on the lower half of the crest.

On 9 April 1865, the 5th Cavalry was selected to serve as the Union Honor Guard for the surrender of the Confederate Army of Northern Virginia at Appomattox Courthouse. The regiment stood by solemnly as it watched its former commander, General Robert E. Lee, surrender to the Union Army.

== Indian Wars ==
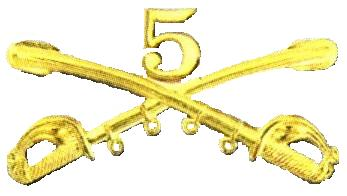
5th Regiment United States Cavalry insignia

In September 1868, the 5th Cavalry Regiment received its orders and began preparations for duty against hostile Indians in Kansas and Nebraska. In the following years the 5th Cavalry fought many skirmishes and battles against the Sioux, Cheyenne and Arapaho on the Great Plains, and against the Utes in Colorado. On 8 July 1869 at the Republican River in Kansas, Cpl John Kyle made a valiant stand against attacking Indians resulting in him receiving the Medal of Honor. The 5th was then sent to Arizona, where it defeated the Apaches in 95 engagements from 1871 to 1874. Due to these actions, General William Sherman told a committee from the United States House of Representatives that "the services of the 5th Cavalry Regiment in Arizona were unequaled by that of any Cavalry Regiment." After General Custer and 264 of his men died at the Battle of Little Big Horn, troopers of the 5th rode after the Sioux to avenge the deaths of their fellow cavalrymen. The punitive ride quickly became known as the Horsemeat March, one of the most brutal forced marches in American military history. Men and horses suffered from starvation, but they eventually caught up with the Indians. Under the leadership of Col. Wesley Merritt, a Civil War veteran, the 5th was instrumental in defeating the Indians at the Battle of Slim Buttes. It was the first significant victory for the army following Little Bighorn. In the next few years the principal engagements in which the regiment took part were with the 2nd Cavalry and 3rd Cavalry.

== Greely Expedition ==
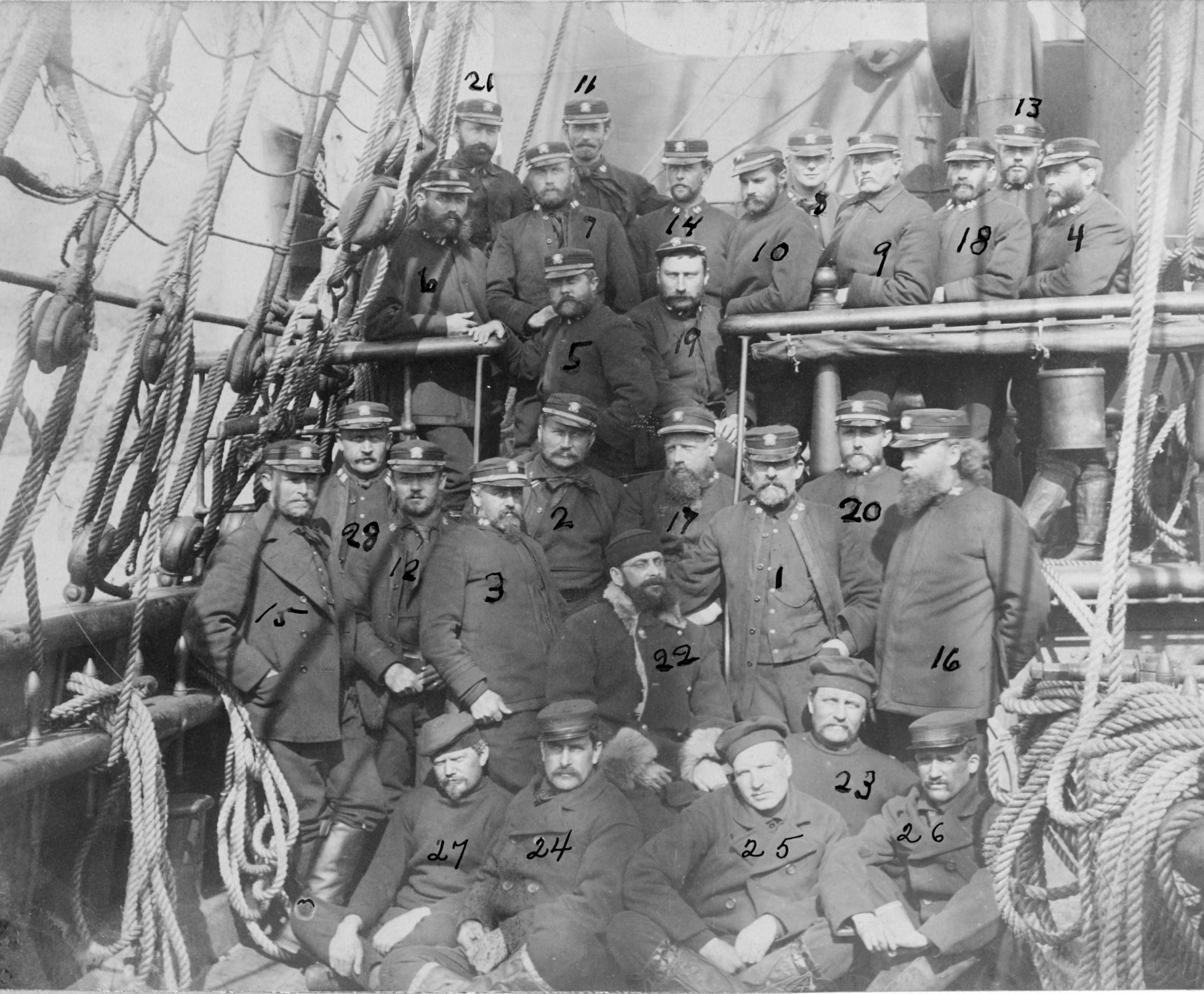
The six survivors of the U.S. Army's Greely Arctic expedition with their U.S. Navy rescuers, at Upernavik, Greenland, 2–3 July 1884. Probably photographed on board USS Thetis (1881).

As the Indian Wars continued, an officer of the 5th Cavalry Regiment, Lieutenant Adolphus Washington Greely, who had overseen the construction of some 2,000 miles of telegraph lines in Texas, Montana, and the Dakota Territories, was selected to lead an exploratory expedition to the Arctic. On 7 July 1881, Greely and his men left St. John's, Newfoundland, and arrived at Lady Franklin Bay on 26 August, where they established Fort Conger on Ellesmere Island, Canada, just across the narrow strait from the northwest tip of Greenland. During their tenure at Fort Conger, Greely and his men explored regions closer to the North Pole than anyone had previously gone. Although they were able to acquire much needed scientific data about arctic weather conditions which was used by later arctic explorers, the expedition lost all but seven men out of the original 25 members of the party. The rest had succumbed to starvation, hypothermia, and drowning, and one man, Private Henry, had been shot on Greely's order for repeated theft of food rations. The survivors were eventually rescued by a naval relief effort under Cdr. Winfield Scott Schley on 22 June 1884.

== Spanish–American War ==
In 1898, the Spanish–American War began after the USS Maine (ACR-1) sunk under suspicious circumstances in Havana, Cuba. As the US mobilized for war, the 5th Cavalry was sent from San Antonio, Texas to Tampa, Florida. A shortage of naval transports and an abundance of military units eager to get into the action meant that the 5th Cavalry Regiment had to be split up, and only a few troops made it to Puerto Rico in time to engage the enemy. Alongside 17,000 other US troops, the troopers landed on the southwest coast of Puerto Rico at the port of Guánica, 15 miles west of Ponce. In July 1898, the regiment was split into four columns of both dismounted scouts and mounted cavalry, and in early August began patrolling across the mountainous enemy-held countryside. Troop A saw most of the action in the Puerto Rican Campaign; under General Theodore Schwan, it was part of the 2,800 man "Independent Regular Brigade." Troop A performed well at the Battle of Silva Heights, at Las Marias and at Hormigueros where the 1,400 Spanish defenders beat a hasty retreat. The regiment's service in this war is symbolized by the white Maltese cross in the black chief of the upper half of the regimental coat of arms. The Spanish turned over the island of Puerto Rico to the United States on 10 December 1898. The 5th Cavalry remained on the island until early in 1899, when it returned to San Antonio.

== 1901–1916 ==
In 1901, the regiment, minus the 2nd Squadron, embarked for the distant Philippine Islands to help put down the bloody Philippine–American War being fought there. In 1902, the 2nd Squadron proceeded to the Philippines to join the rest of the regiment. Dismounted, they battled in the jungles of the Pacific to help end the rebellion and defeat the army of Philippine revolutionary Emilio Aguinaldo.

After returning to the United States, in March 1903 the troopers of the 5th Cavalry were spread throughout Arizona, Colorado, New Mexico and Utah. Some of them fought Navajo Indians in small battles located in Arizona and Utah; a rarity in the twentieth century. The Regiment remained split up for five years until January 1909, when Headquarters along with 1st and 3rd Squadrons were reassigned to Pacific duty to strengthen the U.S. military presence in the new territory of Hawaii.

Although there was a small Army population on the island of Oahu, the deployment of cavalry troops mandated a permanent Army post. By December, Captain Joseph C. Castner had finished the plans for the development of today's Schofield Barracks. The 2nd squadron arrived in October 1910, to help in the completion of the construction. In 1913, threats to the United States-Mexico border brought the 5th Cavalry back to the deserts of the Southwest, where it was stationed at Fort Apache and Fort Huachuca, Arizona.

== Mexican Expedition ==
In 1916, the regiment was dispatched to the Mexican border to serve as part of the Pancho Villa Expedition commanded by General John "Black Jack" Pershing. Commanded for part of its border service by William Jones Nicholson, the regiment crossed the Rio Grande into Mexico and was successful in stopping the border raids conducted by bandits of Pancho Villa who had expanded their criminal operations into the United States, and had brought death to American citizens. The Regiment remained with the Punitive Expedition in Mexico, until 5 February 1917. When the United States entered World War I in April 1917, the 5th Cavalry was selected to remain stateside and defend against incursions along the Mexican border.

After several relocations, in October, the regiment moved into Fort Bliss, relieving the 8th Cavalry Regiment. Following the Mexican Punitive Expedition, the 5th Cavalry Regiment was spread throughout Texas helping safeguard wagon trains, patrolling the Mexican border and training. In 1918, airplanes and tanks had emerged from World War I as the weapons of the future. However, the long history of the Cavalry was not finished. The cavalry remained as the fastest and most effective force for patrolling the remote desert areas of the Southwest and Mexican border. Airplanes and mechanized vehicles were not reliable enough or adapted for ranging across the rugged countryside, setting up ambushes, and conducting stealthy reconnaissance missions and engaging in fast moving skirmishes with minimal support. In many ways, it was just the beginning of a new era. The 5th Cavalry troopers were getting into frequent, small scaled combats with raiders, smugglers and Mexican Revolutionaries along the Rio Grande River. In one skirmish in June 1919, four units, the 5th and 7th Cavalry Regiments, the 8th Engineers (Mounted) and 82nd Field Artillery Battalion (Horse) saw action against Pancho Villa's Villistas. On 15 June, Mexican snipers fired across the Rio Grande and killed a trooper of the 82nd Field Artillery who was standing picket duty. In hot pursuit, the troopers and the horse artillery engaged a column of Villistas near Ciudad Juárez. Following a successful engagement, the cavalry expedition returned to the United States side of the border.

== Interwar years ==
On 18 December 1922, the 5th Cavalry Regiment relieved the 10th Cavalry Regiment and became part of the new 1st Cavalry Division; it has served with this division ever since. In 1923, the division conducted maneuvers in Camp Marfa, Texas and all the 5th Cavalry's wagon trains were drawn by Mules, as it was not motorized yet. The early missions of the division and the 5th Cavalry largely consisted of rough riding, patrolling the Mexican border and constant training. Operating from horseback, the cavalry was the only force capable of piercing the harsh terrain of the desert to halt the groups of smugglers that operated along the desolate Mexican border.

As tensions in Europe began to rise in the 1930s, the 5th Cavalry Regiment continued to train with anticipations of war. The Great Depression of the 1930s forced thousands of unemployed workers into the streets. From 1933 to 1936, the troopers of the 5th Cavalry Regiment provided training and leadership for some of the 62,500 people of the Civilian Conservation Corps (CCC) in Arizona-New Mexico District. One of these workers' significant accomplishments was the construction of barracks for 20,000 anti-aircraft troops at Fort Bliss, Texas.

World War II in Europe began on 1 September 1939 with the German Invasion of Poland, the same day the 1st Cavalry Division was performing maneuvers near Balmorhea, Texas. The 5th Cavalry participated in the Louisiana maneuvers and returned to Fort Bliss in October 1941; they were preparing for war despite the fact that the USA was still neutral. On 7 December 1941, the Japanese Empire attacked Pearl Harbor, Hawaii and drew the United States into the war. The men of the 5th Cavalry Regiment returned from leave and began readying for combat.

== World War II ==
In February 1943, the entire 1st Cavalry Division was alerted for overseas deployment. The soldiers of the division were growing impatient in their idleness, but in order to go to combat, they were dismounted, and ordered to the Southwest Pacific as foot-soldiers; the age of the horse cavalry had ended. In mid-June 1943, the 5th Cavalry Regiment departed Fort Bliss, Texas and headed west to Camp Stoneman, California. On 3 July, the men boarded the SS Monterey and the SS George Washington for Australia. On 26 July, the troopers arrived at Brisbane and were camped at Camp Strathpine. They conducted jungle warfare training in the wilds of Queensland and amphibious training at Moreton Bay. In January 1944, the 1st Cavalry Division left Australia for Oro Bay, New Guinea and began staging there for their first combat operation.

=== Los Negros ===
On 27 February 1944, Task Force "Brewer", consisting of 1,026 troopers, sailed from Cape Sudest, Oro Bay, New Guinea under the command of Brigadier General William C. Chase. Their objective was a remote Japanese-occupied island of the Admiralties, Los Negros, where they were to make a reconnaissance in force and if feasible, capture Momote Airfield and secure a beachhead for the reinforcements that would follow. Just after 0800 on 29 February, the 1st Cavalry Division troopers clambered down the nets of the ships and into the LCM's and LCPR's, the flat bottomed landing craft of the Navy. The landing at Hayane Harbor took the Japanese by surprise. The first three waves of the assault troops from the 2nd Squadron, 5th Regiment reached the beach virtually unscathed. The fourth wave was less lucky; by then, the Japanese had been able to readjust their guns to the beachhead and some casualties were suffered. The Battle of Los Negros had begun.

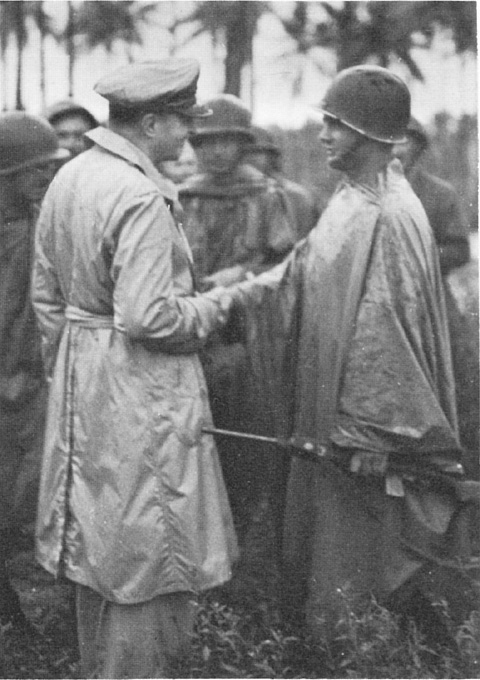
MacArthur and Henshaw

Troops under the command of LTC William E. Lobit of Galveston, Texas, dispersed and attacked through the rain. They quickly fought their way to the Momote Airfield and had the entire airfield under control in less than two hours. The United Press would hail the Los Negros landing as "one of the most brilliant maneuvers of the war." Shortly after 1400 on "D" day, General MacArthur arrived on shore and inspected and praised the Cavalry troopers' actions and accomplishments; then ordered General Chase to defend the airstrip at all costs against Japanese counterattacks. He finally headed back to the beach where he presented the Distinguished Service Cross to Lt. Marvin J. Henshaw, 5th Cavalry, of Haskell, Texas. Lt. Henshaw had been the first American to land on Los Negros in the first wave, leading his platoon ashore through the narrow ramp of a Higgins boat.

As nightfall approached, the troopers began preparations for what they knew was coming; a counterattack. In the darkness around 0200 in the morning, the Japanese infiltrated the 5th Cavalry's perimeter. Hand-to-hand fighting broke out near some foxholes and tough fighting raged the next day and through the night. Japanese pressure on the invasion force remained desperate and intense. The arrival of the 5th Cavalry's reinforcements helped to turn the tide of the fight. In a coordinated maneuver, the 40th Naval Construction Battalion (Seabees) landed on Los Negros Island in support of the 5th Cavalry. Their mission was to reconstruct the Momote Airfield. Assigned to defend a large portion of the right flank, the 40th suffered heavy casualties while defending the airfield alongside the troopers of the 5th. Along with the 40th, the consolidated 5th Regiment soon secured all of the Momote Airfield and spent the long night of 2 March, repulsing Banzai attacks.

The 5th Cavalry Regiment spent its 89th anniversary in combat as they fought off attacks from the Japanese Special Naval Landing Forces. Combat raged on the island on March 3–4. At one point the Japanese had penetrated several hundred yards inside the defense perimeter near G Troop. The cavalrymen rallied and they wiped out the attackers. It was during this fight that a member of the regiment, Staff Sergeant Troy McGill, earned the 5th Cavalry Regiment's, and the 1st Cavalry Division's, first Medal of Honor of World War II. SSG McGill, of Ada, Oklahoma, was the senior man in charge of a line foxholes dug in 35 yards ahead of the main American positions. Suddenly, this line was attacked by a company of 200 Japanese soldiers on a suicidal banzai charge. After all but one of his men were killed or wounded, he ordered the survivor to withdraw and provided covering fire. He held his foxhole, and when his weapon failed, SSG McGill charged the enemy and clubbed them until he was killed. The next morning, 146 enemy dead were found in front of his position.

On 4 March, reinforcements arrived and these men quickly joined the action. On 6 March, the 2nd Squadron, 7th Cavalry Regiment relieved the 5th Cavalry, which had been in almost continuous combat for four days and nights. On 6 March, the 5th Cavalry went back into action to occupy Porolka and the first American planes began using Momote airstrip to assist in the battle. The next day the Black Knights pushed south and overran Papitalai Village on Manus Island after a short amphibious landing assault. By 10–11 March, mop up operations were underway all over the northern half of Los Negros Island and attention was being given to future operations; and the 5th Cavalry was sent west to begin further operations on the large Manus Island. With attention focused on the opening of new operations at Hauwei Island, the 5th Cavalry, alongside the 12th Cavalry, began working their way south of Papitalai Mission through the rough hills and dense jungles in close range, sometimes hand to hand, combat. Tanks occasionally would give welcome support, but mostly the troopers had to do the dangerous job with small arms and grenades. On 22 March, two squadrons from the 5th and 12th Regiments overran enemy positions west of Papitalai Mission. Once again it was tough fighting with the terrain, overgrown with thick canopies of vines, favoring the Japanese. On 24 March, the 5th and 12th Regiments overcame fanatical resistance and pushed through to the north end of the island. On 28 March, the battles for Los Negros and Manus were over, except for mop up operations.

The Admiralty Islands campaign officially ended on 18 May 1944. Japanese casualties stood at 3,317 killed. The losses of the 1st Cavalry Division were 290 dead, 977 wounded and four missing in action. Training, discipline, determination and ingenuity had won over suicidal attacks. The 5th Cavalry Troopers were now seasoned veterans.

=== Leyte ===
On Columbus Day, 12 October 1944, the 1st Cavalry Division departed its hard earned base in the Admiralties for the Leyte invasion, Operation King II. The invasion force arrived on 20 October. Precisely at 1000 hours, the first wave of the 1st Cavalry Division hit the beach. The landing, at "White Beach" was between the mouth of the Palo River, to the south of Tacloban, the capital city of Leyte. Troopers of the 5th, 7th and 12th Cavalry Regiments quickly fanned out across the sands and moved into the shattered jungle against occasional sniper fire.

The fighting near the beaches was still was underway when General MacArthur and Philippines President Sergio Osmeña waded ashore. MacArthur soon broadcast his famous message to the Filipinos: "People of the Philippines: I have returned. By the grace of Almighty God, our forces stand again on the Philippine soil—soil consecrated in the blood of our two peoples... Rally to me! Rise and strike!" To the Philippine resistance and the 17 million inhabitants of the archipelago, it was the news they had long hoped for.

The missions of the 1st Cavalry Division in late October and early November included moving across Leyte's northern coast, through the rugged mountainous terrain and deeper into Leyte Valley. The 5th Cavalry experienced savage combat in rugged terrain when the men secured the central mountain range of Leyte. By 15 November, elements of the 5th and 7th Regiments pushed west and southwest within a thousand yards of the Ormoc-Pinamapoan Highway. By 11 January 1945, the Japanese losses amounted to nearly 56,200 killed in action and only a handful - 389 had surrendered. Leyte had indeed been the largest campaign in the Pacific War, but that record was about to be shattered during the invasion of Luzon.

=== Luzon ===
On 27 January 1945, the men of the 5th Cavalry Regiment landed at Lingayen Gulf on the island of Luzon. There was no resistance, and the Battle of Luzon began with quiet start. With the objective of pushing south and southwest, the regiment assembled at Guimba and received this order from General MacArthur; "Go to Manila! Go around the Japs, bounce off the Japs, save your men, but get to Manila! Free the internees at Santo Tomas! Take the Malacanan Palace and the legislative building!" The next day, elements of the 5th Cavalry joined the infamous "flying column" formed by the 1st Cavalry Division and cut 100 miles deep into Japanese territory and managed to rescue the internees at the Santo Tomas prison camp on 3 February; the prisoners were freed, but the troops of the flying column were far ahead of the advanced American positions. The 5th Cavalry was relieved by elements of the 37th Infantry Division on 7 February and resumed offensive operations against the enemy. As 5th Cavalry troopers continued fighting in Manila, they experienced urban warfare, uncommon in the Pacific Theater. On 23 February, E Troop advanced down a street in Manila supported by tanks, but was attacked by hidden machine-guns and rifle fire. The troop commander was wounded in the middle of the street but PFC William J. Grabiarz ran to save him. After being hit in the shoulder, he was unable to carry his officer so he laid in front of him to shield him from the enemy bullets while calling for tank support. He managed to save his commanding officer from death, but he was riddled by bullets himself and was killed in action. PFC Grabiarz's selfless actions earned him the regiment's second Medal of Honor of World War II.

On 12 April, the 5th Cavalry Regiment pushed south down the Bicol Peninsula in order to link up with the 158th Regimental Combat Team and clear the area of Japanese. They completed this on 29 April after B Troop along with attached engineers launched an amphibious assault in Ragay Gulf near Pasacao. After more fighting across Luzon and stiff battles to drive out stubborn Japanese resistance, the Luzon Campaign was officially declared over on 30 June 1945.

=== Occupation of Japan ===
On 13 August 1945, the 5th Cavalry received orders to accompany General MacArthur to Tokyo as part of the 8th Army occupation force. After arrival in Tokyo, 5th Cavalry headquarters was located at Camp McGill in Yokosuka. The troopers of the 5th Cavalry Regiment were given guard and security missions in the Tokyo area where General MacArthur had taken up his residence. Over the next five years, until the Korean War began, the regiment performed many important duties and services that helped Japan reconstruct and create a strong economy. On 25 March 1949, the regiment was reorganized and Troops became Companies once again, and Squadrons became Battalions.

== Korean War ==
On 25 June 1950, the Army of North Korea crossed the 38th Parallel and invaded South Korea, overrunning and destroying large elements of the Republic of Korea Army; within three days, North Korea had captured Seoul. On 30 June, the United States sent Air Force, Navy, and Marine troops, along with a 1,000 man Army battalion from the 24th Infantry Division and advisers from the 1st Cavalry Division to support the ROK Army. On 18 July, the 1st Cavalry Division was ordered to Korea and landed at Pohang-dong, 80 miles north of Pusan, and 25 miles south of the communist forces. The 5th Cavalry quickly marched on Taejon and was deployed into battle position by 22 July. The next day, the men received their baptism by fire. The 8th Cavalry Regiment was swarmed by North Korean troops and the 1-5 Cavalry was sent to fill in the line. On 24 July, F Company moved to assist the overwhelmed 1-5 Cavalry on their right flank, but the numbers of North Korean troops was too much for the troopers. Only 26 men from Companies B and F escaped alive to friendly territory.

Over the next few days, a defensive line was formed at Hwanggan, and the 5th Cavalry relieved elements of the battered 25th Infantry Division on the line. This line became known as the Pusan Perimeter, and the troopers held on for over 50 days against unrelenting North Korean attacks. On 9 August, 1-5 Cavalry bore the brunt of a massive enemy attack of five divisions near Taegu. Troopers of the 5th and 7th Cavalry Regiments used artillery and air support to defeat the North Koreans, and seized Hill 268, "Triangulation Hill," accounting for 400 enemy dead. The 5th Cavalry Regiment withstood two more large attacks, but held the perimeter. Pusan became a vital staging port for United Nations troops and materiel, and thanks to the efforts of the troops on the perimeter, enough time had been gained that now the defenders outnumbered the attackers. On 17 August, after a battle with North Korean troops, a mortar unit from H Company, 5th Cavalry was forced to surrender. The men were tied up, and 42 were shot and killed and 4-5 more were wounded; this became known as the Hill 303 massacre.

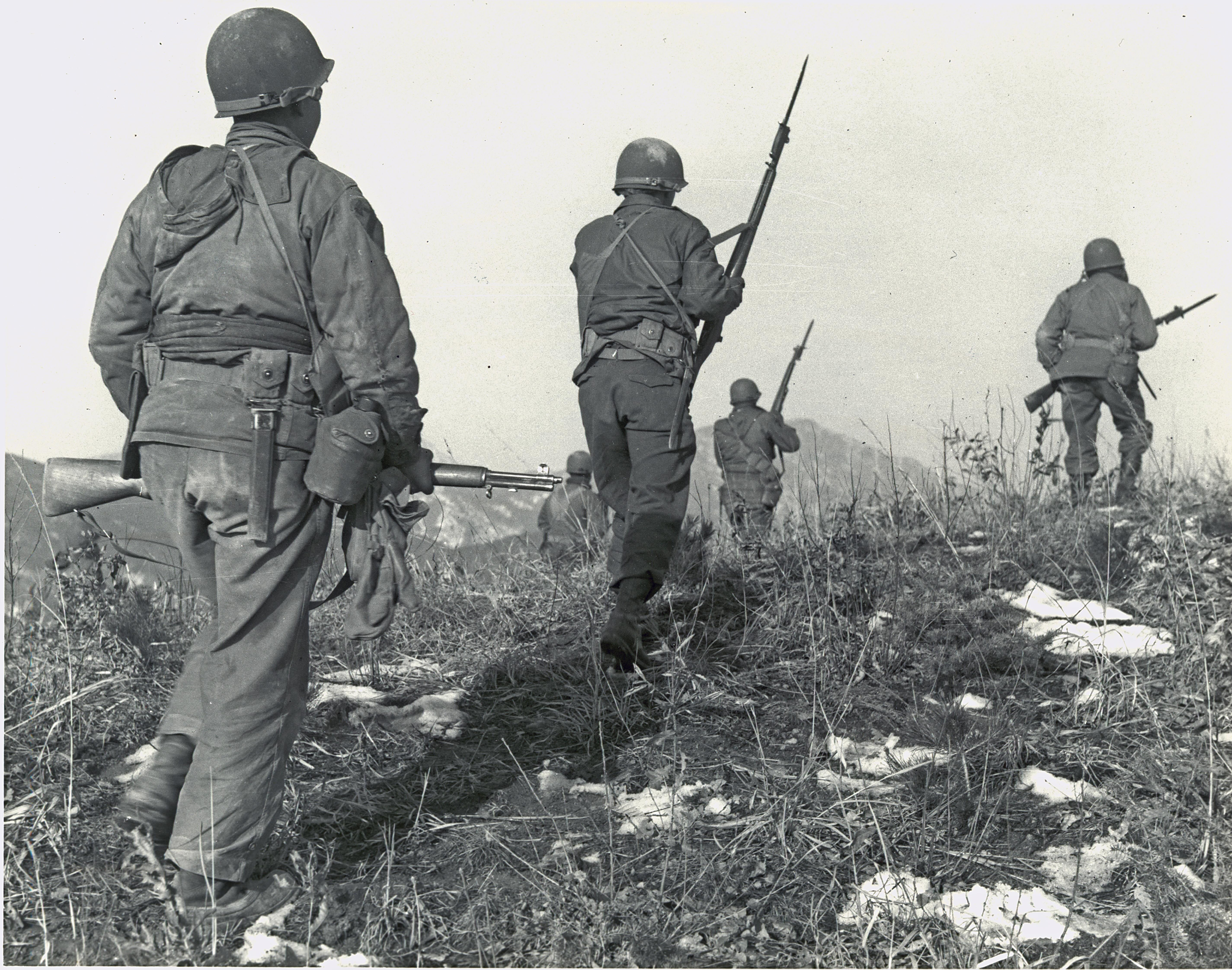
With air and artillery support, men of Company C, 1st Battalion, 5th Cavalry Regiment, advance on "Hill 45" near Ichon, Korea, after three days of bitter fighting for the objective. January 29th, 1951.

When Operation Chromite was launched at Inchon, pressure was relieved from the 1st Cavalry Division positions, allowing them to take the offensive. On 26 September 1950, the 5th Cavalry Regiment crossed the Naktong River and advanced to Sangju, Hamhung, and Osan-dong. The regiment then seized Chongo, Chochiwan, and Chouni from the reeling enemy. On 2 October, the regiment was ordered to establish a bridgehead across the Imjin River, and by 9 October, they had pushed north of the 38th Parallel. On 12 October, as the 5th drove toward the enemy capital, C Company was fighting North Korean forces for control of Hill 174. During the battle one trooper entered an enemy foxhole he thought to be unoccupied. The man was wounded, but his platoon leader, 1LT Samuel S. Coursen, ran to his rescue. Disregarding his own safety, 1LT Coursen engaged in hand-to-hand combat until he was killed. When his body was recovered, seven enemy dead lay in the foxhole. 1LT Coursen saved his soldier's life at the cost of his own and received the Medal of Honor. The 5th Cavalry entered Pyongyang, North Korea's capital, on 19 October and was the first American unit to do so.

On 25 October 1950, Communist Chinese forces intervened and attacked in force across the Yalu River into Korea. On 24 November, GEN MacArthur ordered the 1st Cavalry Division back to the front from its reserve positions to counterattack. Despite this, UN forces fell back and executed an ignominious retreat in the face of overwhelming numbers of Chinese and the bitter cold of the Korean winter. On 25 January 1951, the 5th Cavalry Regiment moved with the rest of the Eighth Army to counterattack, and advanced 2 miles per day despite fierce resistance and extreme weather. On the night of 29–30 January, A Company, 1-5 Cavalry was fighting the Chinese for control of Hill 312. Here, 1LT Robert M. McGovern led his platoon into battle despite heavy wounds, throwing back enemy grenades and knocking out machine guns before he was fatally wounded. 1LT McGovern would receive the Medal of Honor.

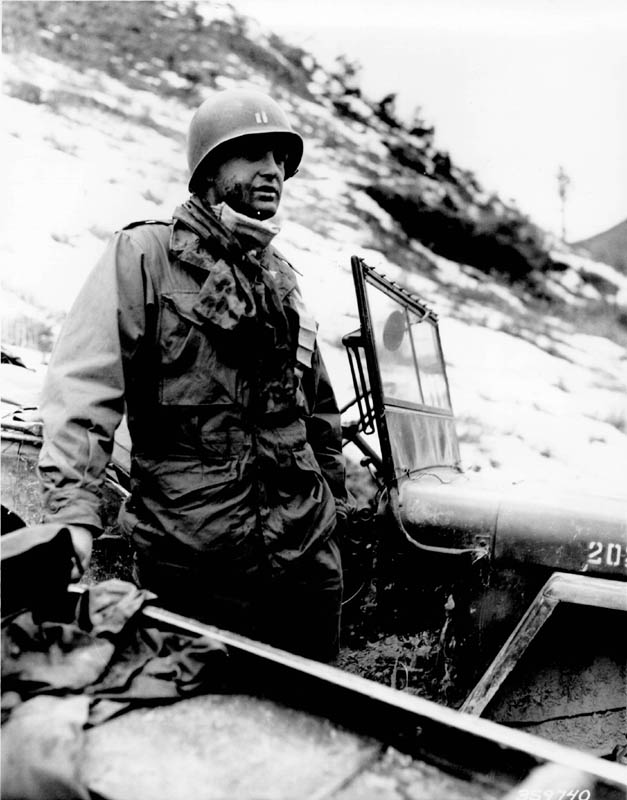
Captain J. W. Finley of Hazelhurst, GA., Co. F, 5th Cavalry Regiment, 1st Cavalry Division, although suffering from severe neck and face wounds as a result of an exploding Chinese grenade, braces himself upright between two Jeeps and refuses to leave until he has finished directing first aid treatment and evacuation of wounded men of his company. 22 February 1951.

On 14 February, the 5th Cavalry Regiment received word that the 2nd Infantry Division's 23rd Infantry Regiment and French Battalion were trapped at Chipyong-ni. The troopers formed a rescue force called Task Force Crombez, and set out with M4A3 Sherman and M46 Patton tanks (painted with tiger stripes) at once. The sight of these fearsome tanks sent the Chinese running from their entrenched positions, allowing the tanks and troopers of L Company, 5th Cavalry, to cut them down in the open. On 15 February 1951, TF Crombez broke through the enemy perimeter and relieved the forces inside, ending the standoff. The Battle of Chipyong-ni has been called "the Gettysburg of the Korean War", as it signified the high-water mark of the Chinese invasion.

Once the dynamic attacks and counterattacks by UN and Chinese forces were spent, the 5th Cavalry Regiment was then part of the "see-saw" fighting against the Communists for control of strategic hills and ridges across Korea. This static warfare was costly and frustrating. During one of the UN major fall campaigns, on 28 October 1951, G Company, 5th Cavalry was engaged in a desperate fight for control of Hill 200 against the Chinese. The American assault stalled until 1LT Lloyd L. Burke charged forward and knocked out two enemy bunkers with grenades and his M1 Garand. On his third charge, he caught enemy grenades in midair and hurled them back at the Chinese. 1LT Burke captured an enemy machine gun and used it to pour flanking fire into the hostile positions, killing 75. Inspired by this show of bravery, his 35 troopers rallied and carried the hill and killed 25 enemies. 1LT Burke was the 5th Cavalry's last Medal of Honor recipient in the Korean War. During their second winter in-country, the 5th Cavalry was relieved and rotated back to back to Hokkaido, Japan on 7 December 1951 after 549 days of constant combat.

== Vietnam War ==
The regiment was reorganized in August 1963 as the 1st and 2nd Battalions, 5th Cavalry Regiment, with the 3rd Squadron, 5th Cavalry added later and serving with the 9th Infantry Division as its armored cavalry squadron. The 1st and 2nd Battalions were organized at Fort Benning in 1965 as airmobile infantry, and then deployed to South Vietnam as part of the 1st Cavalry Division.

=== 1st and 2nd Battalions ===
Between 12 and 13 September 1965, the bulk of the 1st Cavalry Division arrived in South Vietnam and the 5th Cavalry was soon in action; from 18 to 20 September, 2-5 Cavalry supported friendly elements in Operation Gibraltar. However, their first real test did not come until the Battle of Ia Drang. During the fight for LZ X-Ray, elements of the 7th Cavalry were surrounded by large People's Army of Vietnam (PAVN) forces, and 2-5 Cavalry arrived to help. They arrived on the American line and quickly engaged enemy forces, eventually rescuing the "lost platoon" led by SGT Ernie Savage. Once the battle was complete, the 2/5th Cavalrymen set out for LZ Columbus while Alpha Company 1/5th Cavalry and 2/7th Cavalry set out for LZ Albany. The column was ambushed by the PAVN near LZ Albany losing 155 killed for the loss of at least 403 PAVN killed. The 1st Cavalry Division earned the Presidential Unit Citation for their role in the Ia Drang Campaign.

The Viet Cong (VC) was being starved of their food supplies by allied forces, and American commanders launched Operation Paul Revere II on 2 August 1966 to prevent them from capturing rice from farmers; the 1st Cavalry Division was to be used in this operation. Near the border with Cambodia on 14 August, A Co, 1-5 Cavalry inadvertently engaged an entire PAVN battalion, and at the same time, B Co, 2-5 Cavalry began clearing out a series of enemy bunkers dug into the jungle. The next morning, 5th Cav troopers found the bodies of 138 enemy soldiers.

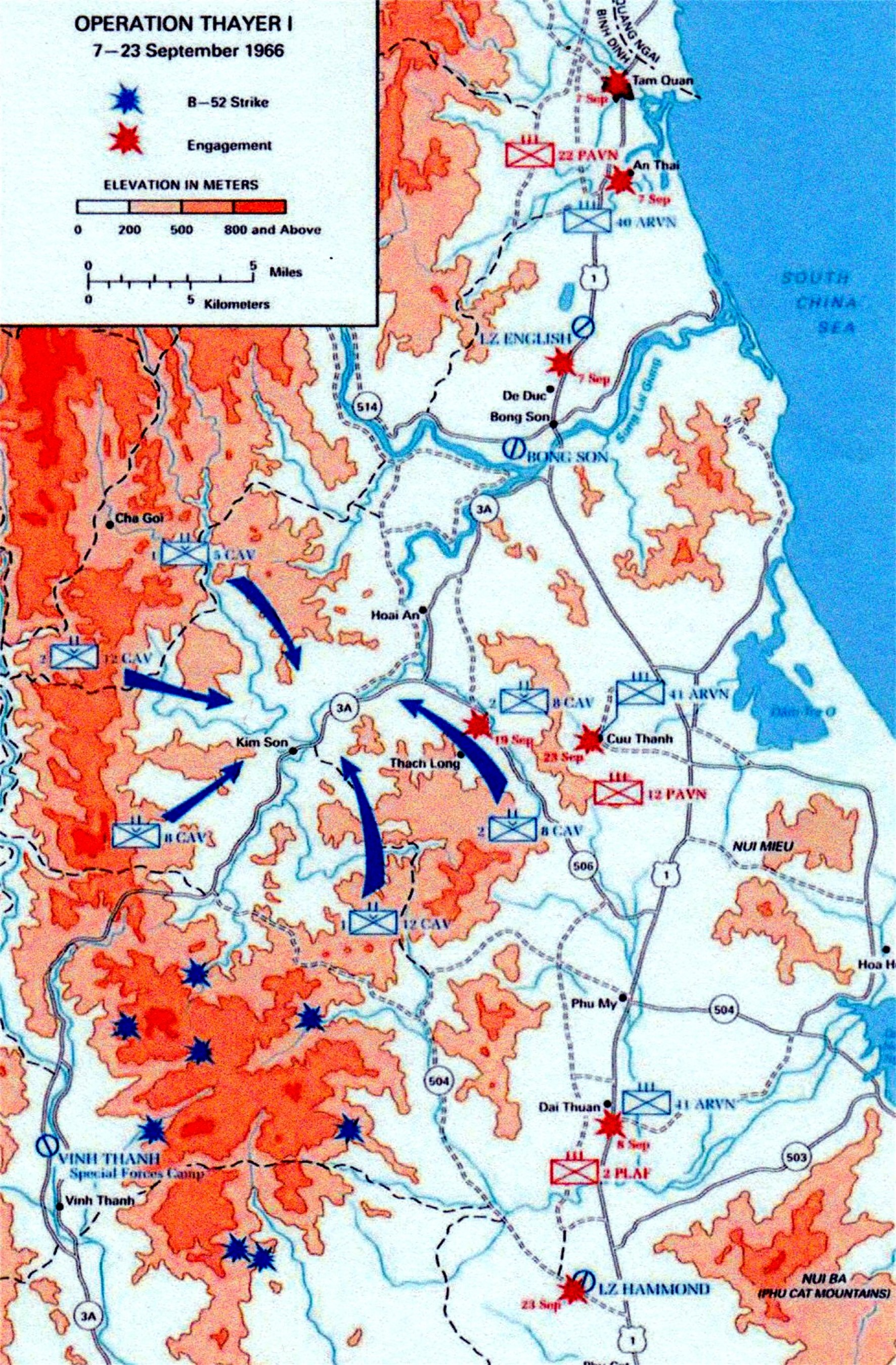
The area of Operation Thayer, Binh Dinh Province, South Vietnam.

On 13 September 1966, the US Army launched Operation Thayer, the largest air assault operation of the entire war. On 2 October, other elements of the 1st Cavalry Division were engaging in heavy combat, and A and C Companies, 1-5 Cavalry were sent east of the main forces to contain enemy movements. On the morning of 3 October, the two companies attacked south and drove the enemy into blocking positions set up by the 12th Cavalry; a classic hammer and anvil attack.

On 13 February 1967, 5th Cavalry Regiment elements took part in Operation Pershing, the longest operation of the 1st Cavalry Division. It ended on 21 January 1968, and resulted in the capture of 2,400 prisoners, 1,500 individual and 137 crew weapons from the enemy, as well as inflicting 5,401 casualties.

On 30 January 1968, the PAVN/VC launched the Tet Offensive during the Vietnamese New Year's celebrations. Near Quảng Trị, Army of the Republic of Vietnam (ARVN) troops were surrounded by VC, and 1-5 Cavalry and 1-12 Cavalry were airlifted to Thon An Thai Valley to the east. These cavalrymen broke the enemy siege, and for ten days the troopers would hound the retreating communists. Following their participation in Operation Pegasus, the relief of Khe Sanh Combat Base, the 2nd Brigade remained in the Khe Sanh area. From 9 to 16 May, the 2nd Brigade conducted Operation Concordia Square/Lam Son 224 in the Leatherneck Square area of eastern Quảng Trị Province under the operation control of the 3rd Marine Division, resulting in 349 PAVN and 28 U.S. killed.

After Phase II of the Tet Offensive ended in PAVN/VC defeat, US troops launched Operation Jeb Stuart III. 3-5 Cavalry, assigned to the 9th Infantry Division, attacked the village of Binh An after they discovered the entire PAVN K-14 Battalion, 814th Regiment was located there. A, B, and C Troops of 3-5 Cavalry assaulted the village from the ground with armor support, while D Co, 1-5, and C Co, 2-5 were airlifted to a nearby LZ and closed in on the village. A final assault was made on the enemy on the morning of 28 June. PAVN casualties were reported as 233 men killed with 44 captured, while only three 5th Cavalrymen were casualties.

In late 1968 the 5th Cavalry elements participated in Operation Toan Thang II, and in Operation Cheyenne Sabre in February 1969.

Although 26 March 1971 was the official date when the 1st Cavalry Division was relieved from combat duties in Vietnam, 2-5 Cavalry helped established 3rd Brigade headquarters in Bien Hoa by interdicting enemy supply routes in War Zone D. On 12 May, 3rd platoon, D Co, 2-5th Cavalry tangled with enemy forces holed up in bunker complexes. With help from the Air Force and 3rd Brigade helicopter gunships, the troopers captured the complex. On 14 June, D Company was involved in another battle when it ran into an ambush in heavy jungle and engaged a company-sized enemy unit. The troopers were pinned down in a well-sprung trap, cavalry field artillery soon pounded the PAVN positions and Cobra gunship fire rained on the enemy positions keeping pressure on the withdrawing PAVN throughout the night.

On 21 June 1972, the last 1st Cavalry Division troops left South Vietnam. In Vietnam 5th Cavalry units participated in twelve campaigns. Six 5th Cavalry Regiment Troopers received the Medal of Honor in the Vietnam War; Billy Lane Lauffer, Charles C. Hagemeister, George Alan Ingalls, Edgar Lee McWethy Jr., Carmel Bernon Harvey Jr., and Jesus S. Duran.

=== 3rd Squadron ===
Organized at Fort Riley, Kansas, as the 9th Infantry Division's ground reconnaissance squadron, the 3rd Squadron arrived in Vietnam in February 1967. Initially deployed west of Saigon near the Mekong Delta region with the rest of the division, the squadron took part in the majority of the division's early combat operations. During Operation Junction City, the squadron took part in the Battle of Ap Bau Bang II on 19–20 March 1967.

By 1968 the 9th Infantry Division was reorganizing in response to perceived difficulties operating in the Delta region. As a result, three of the squadron's four troops (all the armored cavalry assets) were transferred to the I Corps area of South Vietnam. D Troop (the squadron's air cavalry element) remained with the division. An additional infantry battalion was assigned to replace the ground elements sent north.

== Operation Desert Shield/Operation Desert Storm ==
On 12 August 1990, both the 1st and 2nd Battalion, 5th Cavalry Regiment, were alerted for duty in Southwest Asia. They deployed with the 1st Cavalry Division to Saudi Arabia in support of Operation Desert Shield / Operation Desert Storm. They were followed by 3rd and 5th Battalions, 5th Cavalry Regiment, 1st Brigade, 3rd Armored Division (Spearhead ) Ayers Kaserne (The Rock), Kirchgoens, West Germany (redesignated from 2-36 Infantry and 3-36 Infantry) on 28 December 1990 to June 1991.

In December 1994, companies of the 3rd Battalion, 5th Cavalry, deployed to the Former Yugoslavia Republic of Macedonia for peacekeeping duty with the United Nations.

The 3rd Battalion, 5th Cavalry, 1st Brigade (Ready First),1st Armored Division was deployed to Bosnia Herzegovina in December 1995. The Battalion operated out of McGovern Base near Brcko, BiH. Attached to the battalion was Special Operation Detachment Gypsy. Gypsy Team was the civil military operations (CMO) direct support team in Brcko. The team deployed in January 1996 and left the theater in July 1996.

In 1992, Delta Co. 2/5th was deployed to Guantanamo Bay, Cuba for guard duty on Haitian Immigrants camps setup on the Naval Base.

The battalion was deployed in Bosnia and Herzegovina in December 1995

== 21st century ==
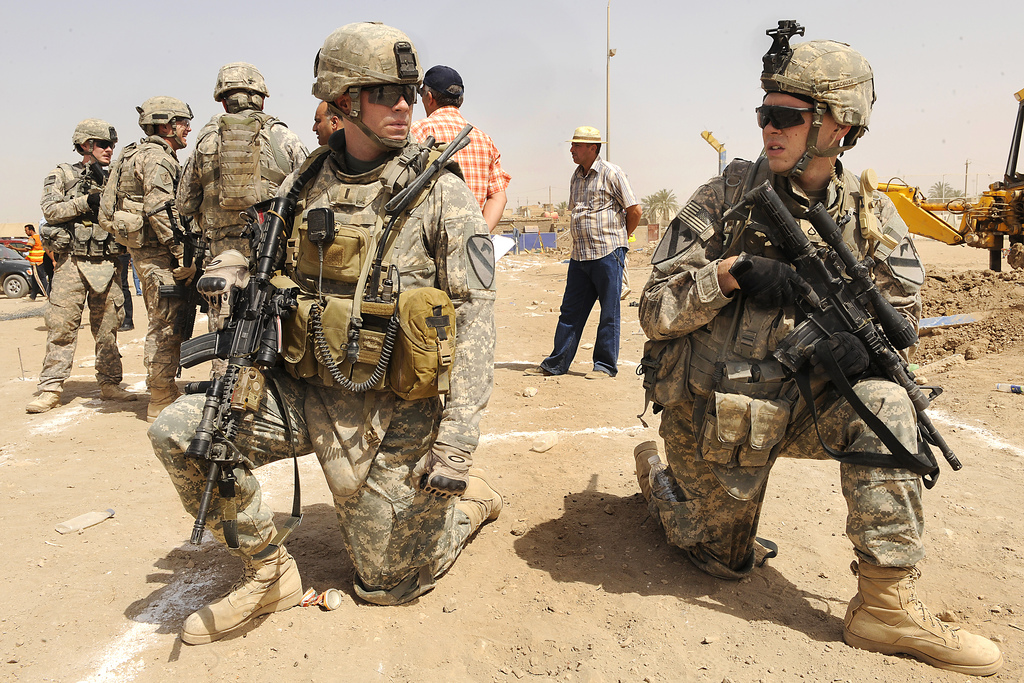
Soldiers of 2nd Battalion, 5th Cavalry Regiment on patrol near Ur, Iraq. (2009)

The "Black Knights" returned to Southwest Asia in March 2004 in support of Operation Iraqi Freedom II. Task Force 1-5 (TF 1-5) was assigned to the Kadamyia District of western Baghdad. In August 2004 the 1st battalion was shifted from stability operations in Kadamiya to go and fight the Madi Army in Al Najaf Battle of Najaf. After completing the mission in Al Najaf, TF 1-5 returned to Baghdad to resume operations in the Kadamyia District. In November 2004 the 1st battalion was again ordered to assist in the retaking of Al Fallujah in the Second Battle of Fallujah. Once the city was under coalition control TF 1-5 moved to North Babil to support the election process in Iraq. From October 2006 to January 2008, TF 1-5 was deployed to the Mansour District of western Baghdad. The majority of the deployment the battalion was attached the Dagger Brigade of the 1st Infantry Division. Task Force 1-5 fought in Al Amiriya bringing that section of the city under control with the help of one of the first Sons of Iraq movements. In January 2008, TF 1-5 redeployed back to Fort Hood, Texas. In January 2009, TF 1-5 again deployed to Iraq. This time the battalion operated in Al Adamyiah. After the SOFA went into effect the battalion moved north to Camp Taji and took over areas north of the camp. In 2004 Task Force LANCER 2-5 Cav was assigned responsibility for Sadr City, in the north-eastern portion of Baghdad. The battalion conducted over 80 days of sustained combat during the initial months of the deployment. After another 30 days of combat, the task force focused on rebuilding the infrastructure and training Iraqi security forces. These efforts contributed to the success of Iraq's first free elections in January 2005.

The 5th Cavalry Regiment today comprises two battalions, both part of the 1st Cavalry Division. The 1st Battalion is assigned to the 2nd Brigade Combat Team, while the 2nd Battalion is assigned to the 1st Brigade Combat Team.

The United States Army has since reactivated another component of the 5th U.S. Cavalry Regiment, in the form of Delta Troop, 5th Cavalry Regiment; as the Brigade Reconnaissance Troop for the 170th Infantry Brigade, in Baumholder, Germany. Although a reflagging of G Troop, 1st Cavalry Regiment, 2nd Brigade Combat Team, 1st Armored Division; the BRTs of Europe remain the Warding Eye and Fulda Gap presence in Germany. Also Echo Troop, 4th Cavalry Regiment, has been reflagged to Echo Troop, 5th Cavalry Regiment, of the 172nd Infantry Brigade in Grafenwoehr, Germany.

In October 2012, D Troop inactivated with the 170th Infantry Brigade. E Troop and the 172nd Infantry Brigade inactivated in May 2013.

== Current status ==
- 1st Battalion is a combined arms battalion of the 2nd BCT, 1st Cavalry Division stationed at Fort Hood, Texas.
- 2nd Battalion is a combined arms battalion of the 1st BCT, 1st Cavalry Division stationed at Fort Hood, Texas.

== See also ==
- List of United States Regular Army Civil War units
