= Operation Pershing =

Part of the Vietnam War (1967–1968)

- Part of Vietnam War
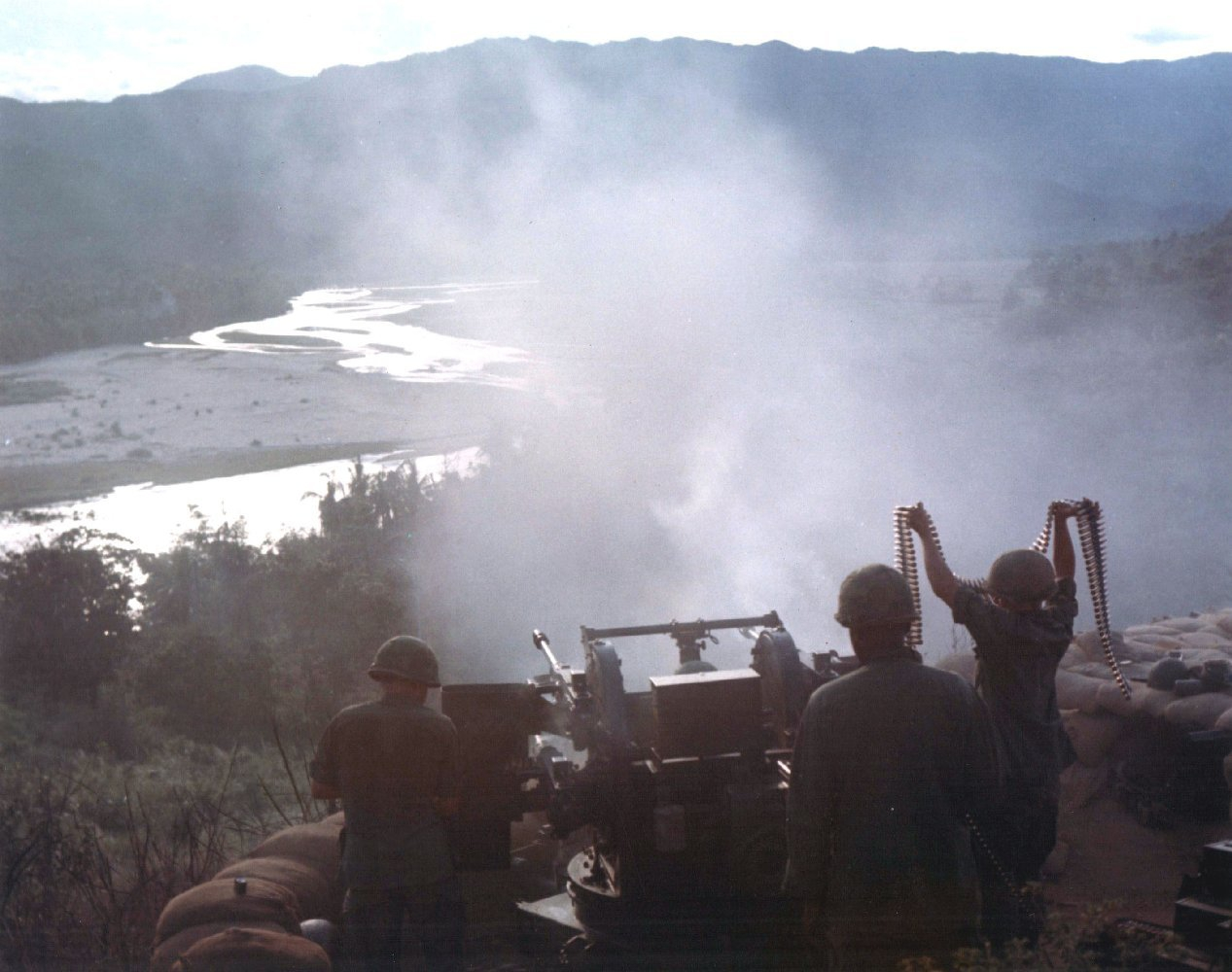
- quad 50 machine gun during Operation Pershing
Date	12 February 1967 – 19 January 1968 (11 months and 1 week)
Location	Bình Định Province, South Vietnam

Belligerents
United States; South Vietnam; South Korea	North Vietnam

Commanders and leaders
(United States) John Norton (United States) John J. Tolson	Le Truc; Vo Thu

Units involved
(United States) 1st Cavalry Division (United States) 3rd Brigade, 25th Infantry Division (South Vietnam) 22nd Division (South Korea) Capital Division	3rd Division

Casualties and losses
(United States) 852 killed 22 missing (South Vietnam) 30+ killed Per PAVN claim: 5,000+ killed, wounded or captured^{:chapter 4}	5,401 killed

Operation Pershing was an operation conducted by the United States (US) 1st Cavalry Division, the US 3rd Brigade, 25th Infantry Division, the Army of the Republic of Vietnam (ARVN) 22nd Division and the South Korean Capital Division in Bình Định Province, lasting from 12 February 1967 to 19 January 1968.

The operation concluded on 19 January 1968 with the 1st Cavalry Division being ordered to move 350 km north from Landing Zone English (LZ English) in Bình Định Province to Camp Evans in Thừa Thiên Province as part of Operation Checkers, to increase the number of maneuver battalions in I Corps in order to support the besieged marines at Khe Sanh Combat Base and defeat any other People's Army of Vietnam (PAVN) attack across the DMZ.

== Background ==
The Bồng Sơn Plain was enclosed on three sides by mountains and bordered on a fourth by the South China Sea, this rich agrarian flatland supported a population of nearly 100,000, mostly farmers and fishermen. It extended north 25 km from the Lại Giang River to the Bình Định-Quảng Ngãi Province border but was only 10 km at its widest point. The An Lão Valley, whose entrance lay at the southern edge of Bồng Sơn, was separated from the plain by the Hon Go Mountains. Longer than the plain but much narrower, it supported perhaps 6,000 people.

During Operation Pershing, 1st Cavalry Division commander General John Norton planned to put two full brigades across the Lại Giang River. His first objective was to clear the entire Bồng Sơn Plain of enemy forces; his second was the north-south An Lão Valley that paralleled the plain to the west. Norton later revised his operational concept, instead of placing his forces on the high ground west and north of the plain and then sweeping north from the Lại Giang River with other units, a rather ambitious undertaking, he decided to limit his objective to trapping and eventually destroying the PAVN 22nd Regiment, thought to be located within a 5-10 km radius north of LZ English.

Norton chose to air-assault Colonel George Casey's 2nd Brigade into landing sites 9 km north of LZ English. Once on the ground, three battalions would move south, pushing the 22nd Regiment into an anvil formed by Casey's fourth battalion augmented by two battalions from the ARVN 40th Regiment. At the same time Col. James S. Smith's 1st Brigade would fly one battalion north of Casey's attacking units to trap any enemy units in that direction. Probing northward, Smith would send two companies into the foothills of the Hon Go Mountains, cutting off any escape west into the An Lão Valley. The rest of the battalion would remain in reserve. Norton's remaining two brigades would stay on the defensive. The 3rd Brigade, under a new commander, Col. Jonathan R. Burton, used its single remaining battalion to hold the Highway 1 bridge over the Lại Giang just south of LZ English. Colonel Shanahan's 3rd Brigade, 25th Division, was to hold the Kim Son and Suoi Ca Valleys south of the river. Norton intended to smash the 22nd Regiment. When he did, he would shift the bulk of his forces north of LZ English to clear the enemy out of Bồng Sơn and An Lão. From there he could sweep into southern Quảng Ngãi and go after both the PAVN 3rd Division headquarters and the 2nd Regiment. Late on the afternoon of 10 February COMUSMACV General William Westmoreland approved the plan. Pershing was to begin at 11:00 on 11 February, nineteen hours before the end of the Tết truce. Norton immediately ordered his troops to move out. At 11:00 gunships and troop-filled helicopters flew toward their assigned objectives.

== Operation ==
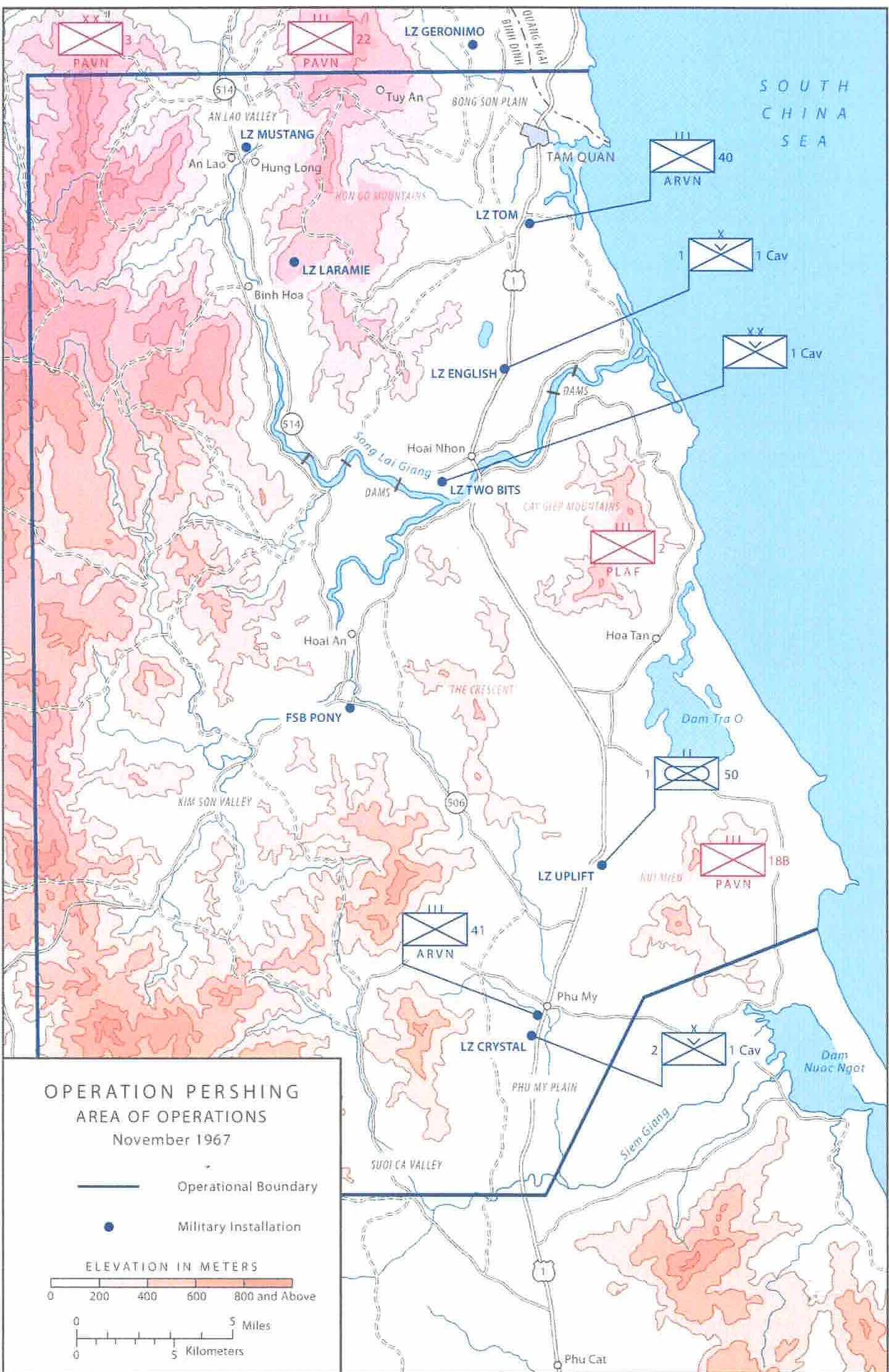
Pershing area of operations, November 1967

As the waves of helicopters flying north of LZ English signaled an abrupt end to the Tết truce, many enemy soldiers caught without weapons rushed from hamlets to seek safety in the jungle. Gunships hovering overhead cut many of them down; others waited until after dark to slip away. Farther north, cavalrymen from the 2nd Brigade leaped from their UH-1 Hueys and began to search the hamlets to the south. Bulldozers moved forward from LZ English along Highway 1 to assist in collapsing bunkers and tunnels. Although a few captured PAVN soldiers indicated that large numbers of their comrades were hiding nearby, the cavalrymen could not find them. As groups of refugees began clogging the roads and slowing the US advance, local Viet Cong (VC) forces skillfully covered the withdrawal of their PAVN comrades. After the first day the tactical momentum gained by Colonel Casey's 2nd Brigade melted away. Known PAVN/VC losses on 11 February were about 50 dead, but as the week proceeded the daily count dropped markedly. By 17 February the Americans were losing at least one soldier for every dead enemy claimed. Booby traps and mines along trails on the fringes of the hamlets accounted for most US casualties. As the number of contacts with enemy units diminished, Pershing appeared to be turning into another arduous, drawn-out sweep.

Not until the second week of Pershing did the 1st Cavalry Division engage a major enemy unit. The action began late on the afternoon of 18 February, when a rifle company from Smith's 1st Brigade found the 22nd Regiment's 9th Battalion in a fortified hamlet, Tuy An, at the base of the mountains west of Tam Quan. The normal confusion of combat combined with approaching darkness made it impossible for reinforcing units to encircle the PAVN, and the Americans lost contact before midnight. Artillery fire on Tuy An produced the only results. When infantrymen entered the hamlet the following morning, they found six bodies in the rubble. Documents seized included sketches of LZ English and the Lại Giang bridge. Nine days later Smith's men attacked an element of the 9th Battalion, 2 km from Tuy An, and killed another 19 PAVN.

While 1st Cavalry Division operations throughout January and February focused on destroying the 22nd, its sister regiment, the 18th located somewhere south of the Lại Giang, enjoyed a respite. During December Norton's men had severely mauled the unit, its discipline and morale broken to the extent that the 3rd Division considered the 18th the least reliable of its three regiments, but after receiving replacements and undergoing extensive retraining, the 18th was again prepared to fight. On 6 March an air cavalry pilot on a routine dawn patrol north of the Tra O Marsh, 16 km southeast of LZ English, spotted a man disappearing into a foxhole outside Hoa Tan hamlet. While one helicopter orbited above, a second landed within 10m of the foxhole in a bold, perhaps foolhardy, attempt to capture the man for questioning. Rifle fire erupted from a nearby hedgerow and pierced the idling helicopter's hydraulic system. Although the pilot was able to coax his ship off the ground to land among sand dunes 800m away, a door gunner, who had leaped from the helicopter, was left behind. The second helicopter radioed for help and dropped to tree level to keep the enemy busy. The commander of the 1st Squadron, 9th Cavalry, Lt. Col. A. I. T. Pumphrey, quickly ordered one of his aero-rifle "blue team" platoons stationed at Landing Zone Two Bits to rescue the abandoned door gunner and then investigate the situation around Hoa Tan. Gunships holding over the hamlet met the team, led the way to the stranded door gunner, and soon rescued him. Moments later the platoon moved on the hamlet and ran into heavy enemy fire. Using the traditional airmobile "piling on" tactic, Colonel Shanahan's 3rd Brigade sent units into the area. During the day five rifle companies formed a loose cordon around the hamlet, while a mixture of artillery, gunships and fighter-bombers kept the enemy under fire. Early the next morning, following a lengthy artillery bombardment, the Americans moved into Hoa Tan and met only feeble resistance. A lone PAVN survivor revealed that the headquarters and two rifle companies from the 9th Battalion, 18th Regiment, had been there at the beginning of the fight but had escaped during the night. PAVN losses were 82 known dead, while seven Americans were killed.

On 8 March, concluding that the remainder of the 18th Regiment might be in the Cay Giep Mountains northwest of Hoa Tan, Norton sent his 2nd Brigade on the heels of a B-52 strike. The search proved futile, and after three unproductive days he shifted operations farther south. The enemy, as one rifle company soon discovered, could be found and engaged, but often only on his own terms. Shortly before noon on 11 March Company C of the 2nd Battalion, 5th Cavalry, conducted an uncontested air assault south of the Tra O Marsh. As the last Huey departed and the men were organizing their sweep, a PAVN company concealed in foliage around the landing zone sprang a trap. Within seconds hostile fire had cut down several Americans, and PAVN soldiers had charged into Company C. So closely intermingled were the two forces that artillery and gunships were useless. For a time the outcome was in doubt, until two other companies arrived and forced the PAVN to withdraw. US losses were 19 killed and 25 wounded, while the PAVN left 10 dead soldiers behind. For another week Colonel Casey's 2nd Brigade continued its fruitless searches. Only after the brigade had returned north to Bồng Sơn on 20 March did the ARVN 41st Regiment, 22nd Division, find the other two battalions of the 18th Regiment, the 8th Battalion southeast of Phù Mỹ District and the 7th Battalion west of LZ Hammond (14.076°N 109.044°E). In two firefights the ARVN claimed 50 PAVN killed and captured three, but thereafter the 18th Regiment again dropped out of sight.

Meanwhile, to the north of the Lại Giang, the 22nd Regiment continued to avoid battle. While its 8th Battalion fled across the Hon Go Mountains into the An Lão, the rest of the regiment moved north into the upper reaches of the Bồng Sơn Plain. The PAVN hid themselves so well during the first half of March that neither Burton's 3rd Brigade in the An Lão, nor Smith's 1st Brigade in Bồng Sơn could find any trace of them. This frustrating situation changed shortly after midnight on 18 March, when a South Vietnamese Popular Forces outpost at Sa Huỳnh Base, a small port north of the Bình Định-Quảng Ngãi border, reported human-wave attacks by an estimated two battalions that threatened to overrun its position. Believing that the attackers were from the 22nd Regiment, Norton shifted Smith's brigade into the hills west of Sa Huỳnh to intercept. Captured documents later revealed that the attackers were actually the 3rd Division's sapper battalion. Although the sappers escaped, the Americans were primed for an encounter with their real target, the 22nd Regiment. The following evening, 19 March, while looking for a place to settle in after a hot, unproductive day in the jungle, one of Smith's rifle companies stumbled upon a PAVN unit in Tường Sơn hamlet (14.6020603°N 109.0127796°E), 18 km north of LZ English. Since the size of the PAVN force was unknown, the company formed a perimeter as a firefight erupted. Within a half hour its commander realized he had uncovered a major element, and he radioed for help. Smith responded by dispatching four companies overland through the darkness toward Tường Sơn in an attempt to seal the PAVN inside the hamlet. At the same time a helicopter hovered overhead, illuminating the PAVN's positions with flares, while gunships raced in to add rockets and machine guns to the incoming artillery fire. Back at LZ Two Bits, Norton decided to reinforce before the PAVN could escape north into Quảng Ngãi Province. Time was critical, the only way to keep the PAVN in place was by blocking his exits with a night air assault, a risky undertaking that was rarely attempted. After Norton transferred a battalion from the 3rd to the 1st Brigade, Smith dispatched the better part of the unit to the battle area just after midnight. Four hours later a prisoner from the 22nd Regiment's reconnaissance company revealed that his mission had been to find escape routes for the regimental headquarters, its signal and support companies, and its 9th Battalion. The information made the size of the PAVN force known to Norton for the first time. At dawn Smith sent additional units to seal off the area. One started a fight with the 22nd's 7th Battalion south of Tường Sơn. The new action prompted Norton to shift units from his 2nd Brigade northward across the Lại Giang with bulldozers to help destroy PAVN bunkers. In all, the 1st Cavalry Division had now committed 13 rifle companies from five different battalions. Yet, for all Norton's efforts to entrap the PAVN, the 22nd escaped once more. The force surrounded at Tường Sơn succeeded in breaking off during the evening of 20 March, and the 7th Battalion did the same 24 hours later. Subsequent sweeps through both areas produced a body count of over 120 PAVN dead for the three-day struggle, compared to 34 Americans killed. Nevertheless, by early April it was evident that the 22nd had slipped north into the mountains of southern Quảng Ngãi with only its 8th Battalion remaining in Bình Định, shunning combat and well hidden in the An Lão Valley.

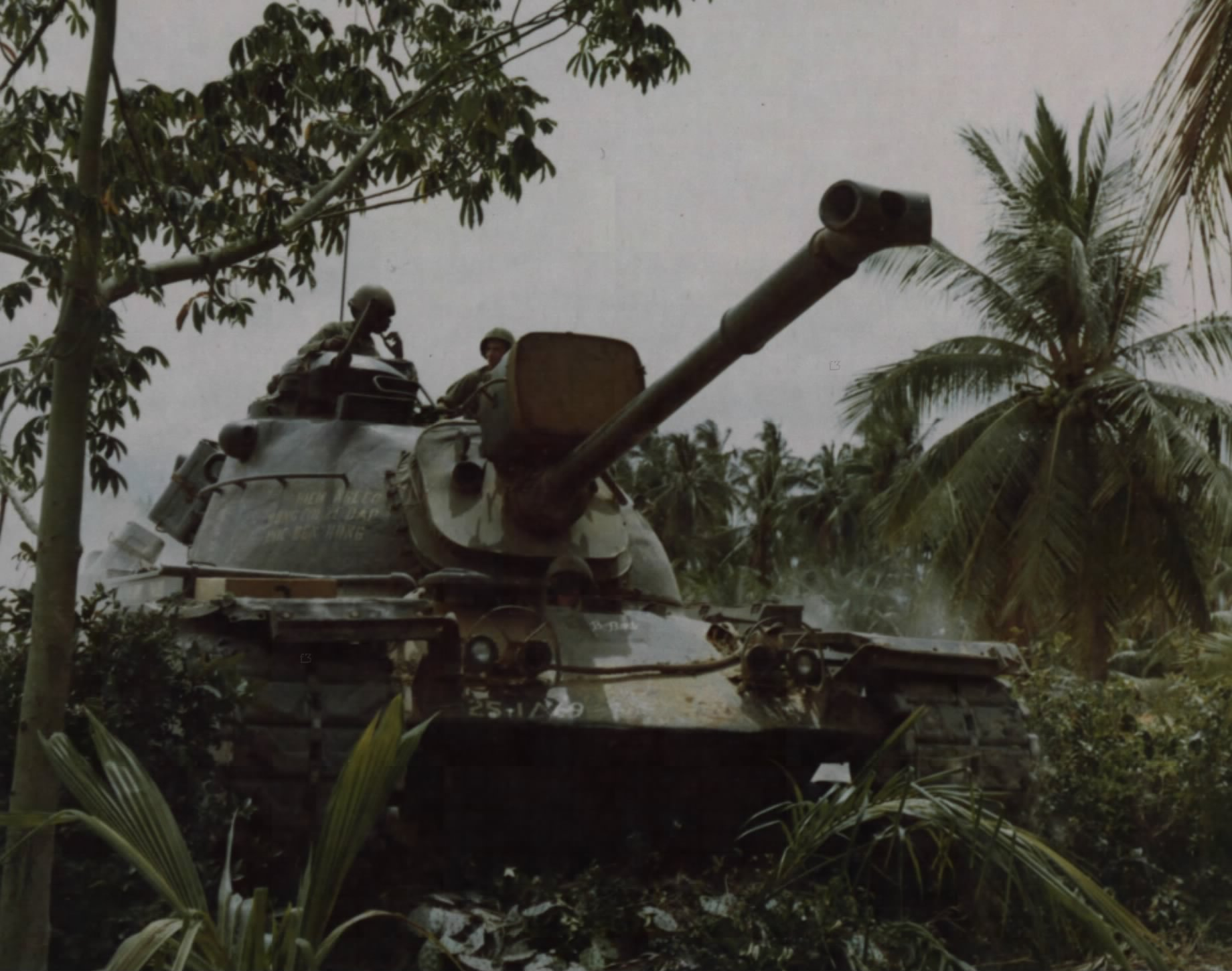
M48A3 used to support the operation

Late in March a battalion from the 3rd Brigade moved into the northern end of the An Lão in an attempt to find a PAVN unit reported lurking there. As the Americans probed southward they encountered small groups of PAVN soldiers attempting to escape, but not until 8 April did they come upon the main body of the 22nd Regiment's 8th Battalion in the recently abandoned hamlet of Hung Long. The 3rd Brigade commander, Colonel Burton, quickly fed four additional companies and a tank platoon into the area. The tanks were a temporary addition to the 1st Cavalry Division. Received on 30 March from the 4th Infantry Division, they required careful route reconnaissance and shallow stream fords, but succeeded in holding down US losses at Hung Long. Catching the PAVN unprepared to cope with armor, they spearheaded the attack and contributed to a body count of 78, before the remaining PAVN soldiers fled north into Quảng Ngãi Province.

US and ARVN forces in Bồng Sơn and An Lão had intended to keep the local population in place throughout Pershing, however that proved difficult. By mid-March over 12,000 of the area's inhabitants had left their homes voluntarily to seek the safety of government-secured areas south of LZ English and around Tam Quan City, where the Americans had provided food and shelter for refugees. Compounding the problem, on 15 March the ARVN 22nd Division decided to launch a third and final area denial operation in Binh Dinh, this time in the An Lão Valley. For four days the ARVN warned the people through leaflets and loudspeakers. Then, while units of Norton's 3rd Brigade screened the high ground on either side of the valley, two Vietnamese Marine battalions, chosen because they had no home ties in the region, moved north up the defile. Trailed by a long convoy of empty trucks, the Marines loaded people and their possessions and sent them south. Reaching the north end of the valley within a week, they turned back south and swept stragglers and resisters into the waiting camps while destroying everything of value. In spite of those efforts, only 3,800 of an estimated 6,000 valley residents were found and evacuated. Denial operations continued for the next three months in both the An Lão and Kim Son Valleys, resulting in the removal of 12,000 more civilians. In addition, the ARVN reported killing 182 VC, capturing 152 and convincing another 399 to Chieu Hoi. By July there were close to 140,000 refugees in Bình Định Province, so stretching the government's ability to care for them that further population relocations had to be discontinued. Area denial operations were actually an essential part of Norton's campaign against the 3rd Division, particularly since he had the battered force in full retreat. With the civilians gone from the An Lão, Kim Son and Suoi Ca Valleys, he could place unrestricted fire into those areas if the PAVN/VC ever returned. In addition, the 3rd Division would not have a ready source of food and laborers from which to draw. Using a minimum force to screen the valleys, Norton could continue pressing north to complete the destruction of the 3rd Division in southern Quảng Ngãi Province, but the ugly process of evacuation and destruction obviously made few friends for the Americans and the South Vietnamese government among the peasantry.

By the end of the 1966-1967 rainy season, the 3rd Division seemed on the verge of collapse. MACV estimates during 1966 had placed the division's strength at over 11,000, nearly twice the size of most enemy divisions in South Vietnam. By April 1967, however, despite the cannibalization of many of its support elements to fill the infantry units and the arrival of large numbers of replacements from North Vietnam, the division would remain ineffective for most of the year. The departure of the 3rd Division from the Bình Định plain, the heartland of the insurgency in central Vietnam, clearly represented a major setback. The unwillingness of the division to stand and fight may have surprised the local inhabitants, but taking on the Americans was now recognized as suicidal. During Operation Thayer alone, of the 194 enemy soldiers captured, 70 had been North Vietnamese. Most of those who surrendered reported low morale in their units, acute shortages of food and medicines, and a lack of confidence in their leaders. As Norton became more aware of the PAVN plight, so too had the commander of the 3rd Division, Col. Le Truc. In a message to his subordinate commanders in December 1966, he noted that "new difficulties have beset us" including "continuing attacks, serious casualties, and attacks upon our rear bases." He complained of a "considerable increase" in the number of "shirkers," many of whom "surrender and betray us." Discipline had to be restored immediately, even if it became necessary to "purge the ranks of undesirables." As Norton's men persisted in grinding down the 3rd Division still further during the next three months, Truc's superiors decided to replace him. Local VC forces in Bình Định were also in disarray. Having been firmly entrenched throughout the province for a generation, they were quickly losing their traditional areas of support. Of particular concern to the VC province chief was the loss of the Siem Giang Valley and the Bồng Sơn Plain. In the 1st Cavalry Division operational area, Norton estimated that 80 percent of the people had been removed from insurgent influence, at least temporarily, although they were not necessarily under the control of the South Vietnamese government. The enemy's military forces had been defeated, Norton correctly noted, but the political battle was still being fought. Cautious optimism on the part of the US advisers in Bình Định was evident in the province's Hamlet Evaluation System, or HES, report for April 1967. The HES reports estimated that 68 percent (660,000) of the people of Bình Định lived in areas under government control; another 14 percent resided in contested areas; while the remaining 18 percent still lived in regions under VC domination. Six months earlier, in October 1966, Westmoreland had reported that "only 22 percent of the population of Bình Định Province is considered secure." Whatever the long-term prospect, this apparent success was considered the most important turnaround in any province.

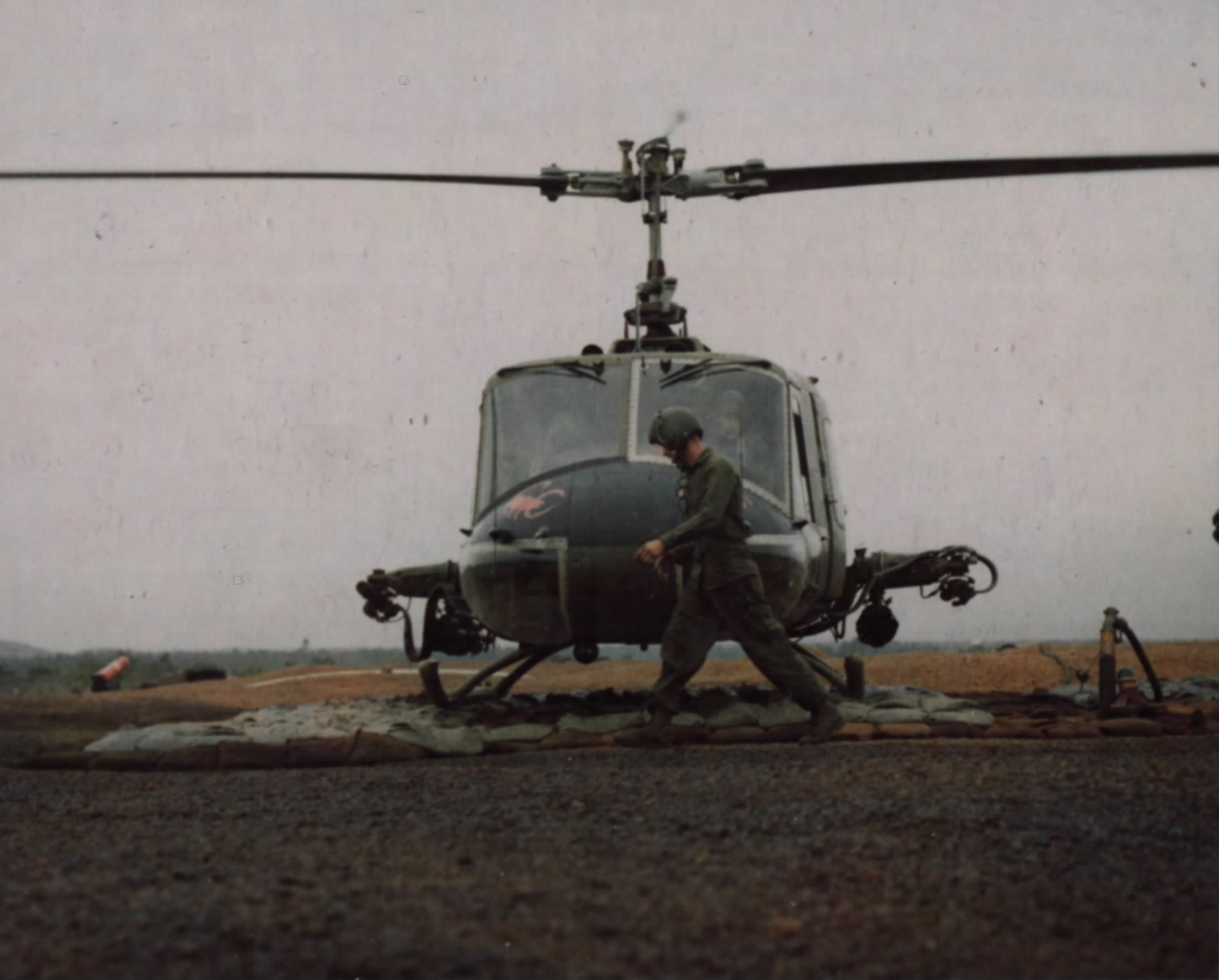
A UH-1B gunship of Troop "A", 1st Squadron, 9th Cavalry Regiment refuels, 27 May

During April the 3rd Brigade completed a sweep of the An Lão Valley and then, extending the Pershing operational area north into the lower reaches of Quảng Ngãi Province, had air-assaulted into two areas the allies had not previously entered, the Sang Mountains and the Nuoc Dinh Valley. There, the brigade found caretaker units, ammunition and weapons caches and several sophisticated base camps, but failed to locate its major objective, the headquarters of the 3rd Division. As June opened, the 3rd Brigade raided the western fringes of the Pershing area and the lowlands along the South China Sea, but again the PAVN evaded and the brigade then flew off to the western highlands. By late June the 1st Cavalry Division had only four battalions to continue the hunt for the 3rd Division: two with Col. Donald V. Rattan's 1st Brigade north of the Lại Giang and two south of the river with Col. Fred E. Karhohs' 2nd Brigade, ensconced on the Phù Mỹ Plain. Meanwhile, the number of PAVN troops was on the rise. During May, June and July-the opening months of the northern dry season, a steady stream of PAVN replacements flowed into Bình Định. Colonel Thu, the new 3rd Division commander, soon set his units into motion, with the 22nd Regiment resuming attacks north of the Lại Giang, the 2d Regiment maneuvering south of the river, and the 18th deploying still farther south for operations against the South Koreans. As the 18th displaced south, in mid-August the 2nd Brigade happened upon a replacement group that had recently joined the regiment. The new troops, presumably still in training, were in a series of caves south of the Lại Giang and east of Highway 1 in the Mieu Mountains. After surrounding the caves, Karhohs' men killed 33 and captured another 41. Then the 1st Cavalry lost contact with the 18th Regiment. By this time the 3rd Brigade was back on the coast, and on 7 August, the new division commander General John J. Tolson sent Colonel McKenna's troops into the Song Re Valley in Quảng Ngãi Province, 20 km west of Ba To. Stretching some 40 km north to south, the narrow valley was laced with carefully cultivated rice paddies and well-fed livestock, but seemed devoid of people. McKenna advanced cautiously from Gia Vuc, leapfrogging battalions and establishing intermediate firebases. Although the troopers encountered no-one in the first two days, they had a feeling they were being watched. On the morning of 9 August, one cavalry company conducted an air assault onto three small hills, an objective called LZ Pat (14.888°N 108.518°E), 15 km north of Gia Vuc. As the last six Hueys lifted off, the PAVN opened fire with heavy machine guns. Bullets riddled all of the helicopters, bringing three to the ground, while the other three limped back to Gia Vuc. On the ground, the PAVN swarmed the lone company. One group, hidden at the base of the hill area, surged out of its trenches and bunkers, while another unit, hidden midway up the western slope of the valley, fired down on the isolated American soldiers. While the cavalry troopers sought cover and returned fire, their company commander, Capt. Raymond K. Bluhm, called in artillery and air strikes. They rained down quickly on the attackers, saving the American company from certain extinction. When the fight ended four hours later, a third of the company were casualties, 11 killed and 27 wounded, while only a few enemy dead and some weapons were found. The PAVN had vanished. Over the next several days McKenna's troops continued northward, but there was little evidence of the PAVN. When the operation finally ended on 21 August the Americans had learned little more about the region than they knew before entering it. Because of the heavy antiaircraft fire at LZ Pat on the ninth, they speculated that they had been near a major headquarters, but more than that they could not say.

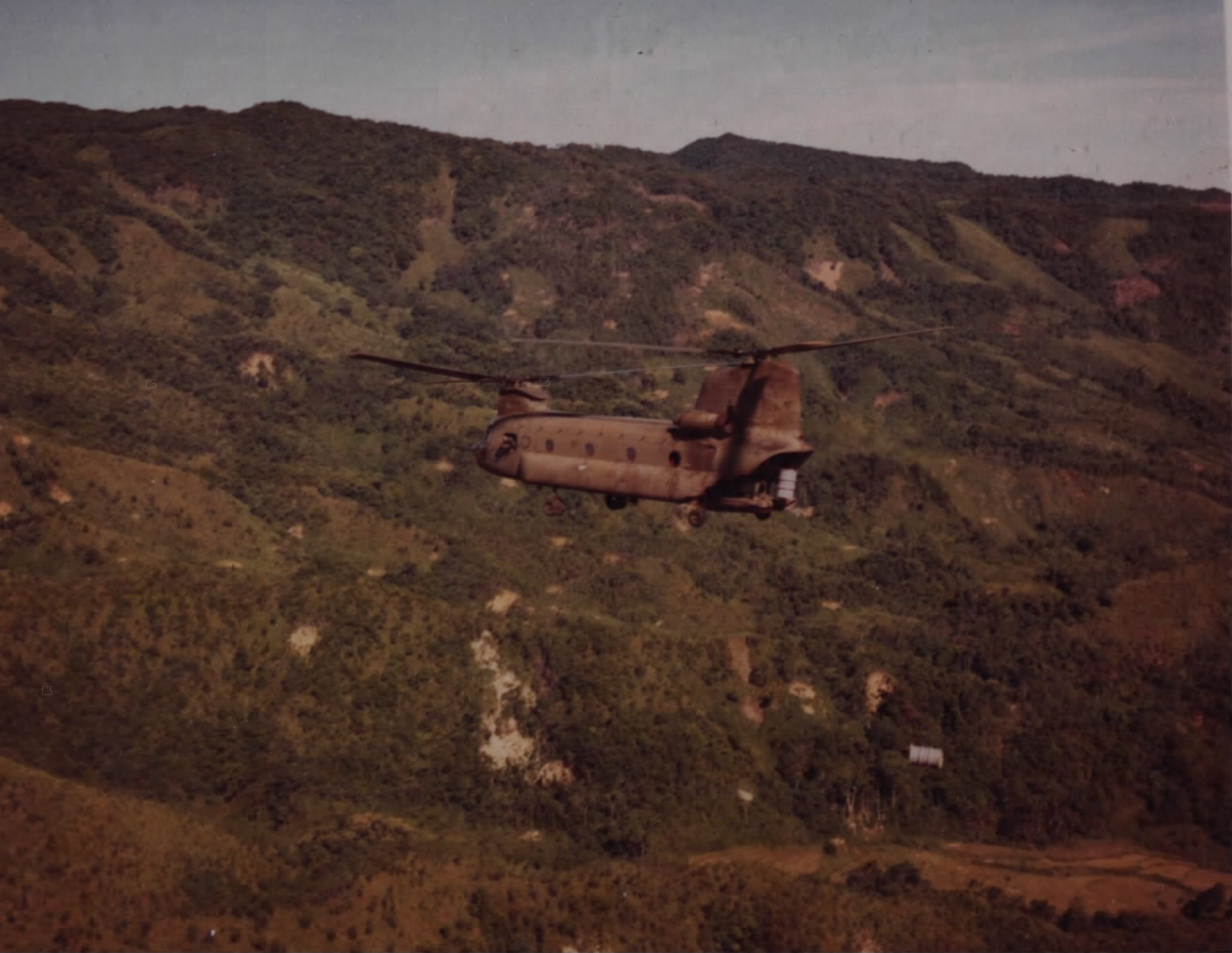
A CH-47 drops CS gas, July 1967

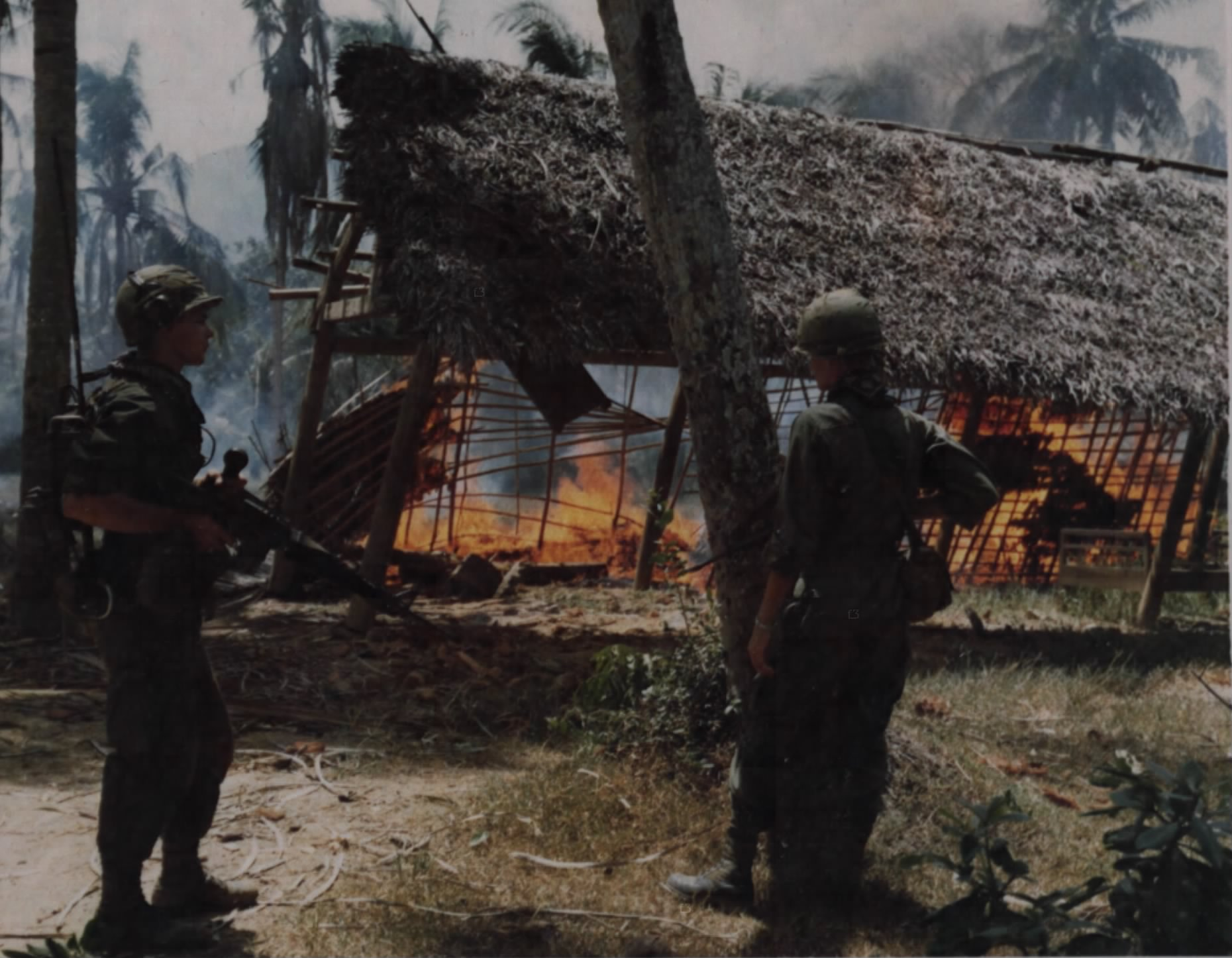
Men from B Troop, 1st Squadron, 9th Cavalry with burning VC hut, 21 July

After the operation was completed, Tolson returned the 3rd Brigade to the An Lão Valley, detaching two of its battalions to reinforce the other two brigades on the coastal plain. Intelligence indicated that the PAVN planned to launch attacks from there against 1st Cavalry Division installations before the September Presidential elections. Mentioned frequently in the reports was LZ English, the division's large logistical base on the southern Bồng Sơn Plain just north of the Lại Giang. On 6 June a fire, presumably set by PAVN sappers, had nearly destroyed English, and it was still vulnerable to attack. This time the advance information proved reasonably accurate. The first sign of the predicted offensive came after dark on 22 August, when an enemy force assaulted a company of the 1st Brigade just east of English. Although the attack failed, US intelligence still believed that the 22nd Regiment would soon attack English itself. Instead, the PAVN chose to strike Tolson's forward command post, LZ Two Bits, a few kilometers south. Shortly before midnight on 25 August, the troops defending Two Bits conducted a Mad Minute. The PAVN responded with recoilless rifle and mortar fire that continued for fifteen minutes. US artillery responded immediately, followed later by gunships. The concentrated fire may have upset the PAVN's plans, and there was no ground attack that night. Other than these two attacks, enemy attempts to interfere with the elections in Bình Định were minimal. Ultimately, over 95 percent of the registered voters in the province voted, giving it one of the highest percentages of any province in South Vietnam (with a national average of 83.8 percent). In hindsight, however, the turnout may have been cosmetic. As American advisers pointed out, the Saigon-appointed province and district chiefs could threaten anyone who failed to vote. More revealing, the strong showing of peace candidates in the election indicated that many preferred a cessation of hostilities rather than a continuation of the Nguyễn Văn Thiệu regime. Shortly after the election, one of Tolson's battalions left to reinforce the 173rd Airborne Brigade in Phú Yên Province for a month, and activity generally dropped off in Bình Định Province. For the remainder of the northern dry season, Tolson kept the 1st and 2nd Brigades on the coastal plain, protecting the rice harvest and working with local troops and officials against VC guerrillas, leaving the 3rd Brigade to probe the mountains and valleys for larger prey. On 14 September this force, now operating with two battalions, found the headquarters of the 22nd Regiment in a narrow draw that led into the An Lão Valley, about 15 km northwest of LZ English. Although the base had been abandoned, McKenna's men discovered large ammunition stores and a cache containing 41 weapons, over half of which were crew-served. Also captured was a large radio, the 22nd Regiment's code books, and most of its administrative records. In October American intelligence detected a reconstituted headquarters of the 22nd operating from the Cat Mit Mountains in Quảng Ngãi Province, far removed from its three battalions presumably still hiding in the Bình Định interior. As the 3rd Brigade continued to search for the PAVN battalions in September, I Field Force, Vietnam again tasked the division to provide a brigade for operations elsewhere, this time for the Americal Division in southern I Corps. Again Tolson nominated the 3rd Brigade, and the unit left Bình Định, this time for good, on 1 October, leaving only four cavalry battalions in the coastal province once deemed critical. A further reduction came in November, when the 1st Brigade left for the western highlands with two battalions to support the Battle of Dak To. Bình Định, once the focus of US activity in II Corps, was becoming a sideshow.

I Field Force commander General William B. Rosson attached the 1st Battalion, 50th Infantry (Mechanized), a unit that had arrived in September to the cavalry for service along the coast. Tolson partially converted the mechanized battalion into an airmobile force, concentrating its armored personnel carriers at the 2nd Brigade's base camp, Landing Zone Uplift. Since the approaching monsoon season would bog down the armor, the battalion was to rely on whatever helicopters the division could spare. In an emergency, assuming the ground was dry enough, the infantry could always fly back to LZ Uplift, climb into its armor, and move overland. Operating in its airmobile mode in early October, the battalion came upon a PAVN force in bunkers west of Highway 1 in the 506 Valley (named for the road running through it). The unit was subsequently identified as the 93rd Battalion, 2nd Regiment that had left Quảng Ngãi earlier in the month. When the fight ended, the Americans counted 58 PAVN dead and 48 captured weapons. Two months later the mechanized battalion would also engage a unit of the 22nd Regiment, this time a few kilometers north of LZ English, near Tam Quan. Since 11 February, when Operation Pershing had begun, the 1st Cavalry Division claimed 3,900 PAVN soldiers killed and more than 2,100 prisoners and 1,100 weapons captured. The cost had been high, however with 498 troopers killed and 2,361 wounded, but the successes also showed that the PAVN was still trying to contest Bình Định Province, albeit with only poorly trained troops and recent replacements. His basic strategic mission remained the same: divert the attention of the allied regulars to ensure the survival of his local organizations.

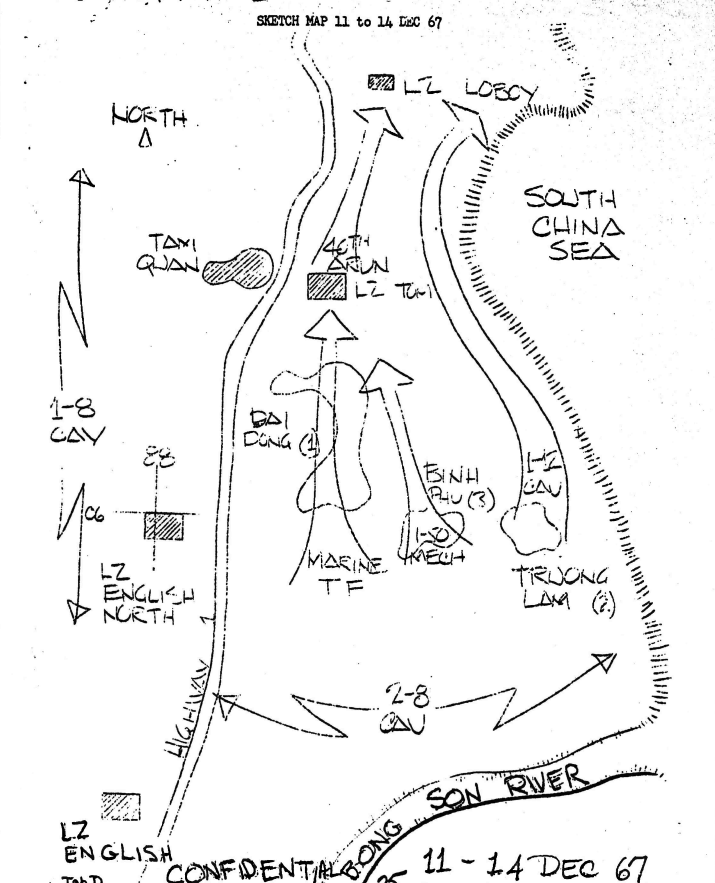
Battle of Tam Quan 1967 - Sketch Map

In mid-November when Tolson learned that the 22nd Regiment, was preparing to move from Quảng Ngãi Province onto the Bồng Sơn Plain. He responded to the threat by asking General Rosson to return the 1st Cavalry Division’s 1st Brigade from the western highlands. Even though the Dak To battle had not yet ended, Rosson agreed that more troops were needed to protect Bình Định Province. When the 1st Brigade, 1st Cavalry Division, flew back to the coast later that month, Tolson stationed it at LZ English and gave Colonel Rattan, control over all 1st Cavalry Division units north of the Lại Giang. Rattan got his first solid fix on the PAVN on 6 December. Just after midnight, the 22nd Regiment sent a battalion to attack LZ Tom, an ARVN outpost 9 km north of LZ English. When the assault went badly, the PAVN battalion commander radioed his regimental colonel and asked for instructions. A US radio research unit intercepted the transmission and determined that the 22nd Regiment’s command post was broadcasting from Dai Dong, a village just to the southeast of Tom. The news surprised Tolson. After all the work over the previous year, the PAVN had once again infiltrated main force units down onto the heavily populated lowlands, albeit to an area with deep VC connections. When a helicopter crew sent to investigate the intelligence report spotted an antenna protruding from a bunker near Dai Dong, he landed an aerorifle reconnaissance squad, known as a Blue Team, to check it out. Dai Dong village contained four hamlets. The two largest hamlets, Dai Dong (1) and Dai Dong (2), formed a long north-south island on a sea of flooded rice fields. Below Dai Dong (2) lay the third and fourth hamlets in the village, smaller in size, which stretched eastward to the sea, named Bình Phú (14.5217987°N 109.0462199°E) and Trường Lâm (14.5139115°N 109.0608559°E now Trường An and Lâm Trúc). The radio antenna that the heliborne scouts had spotted was situated in Dai Dong (2). No sooner had the Blue Team landed in a field west of Dai Dong (2) when the hamlet erupted with machine gun and small arms fire. The American soldiers found it impossible to move forward. When a second Blue Team landed nearby to relieve some of the pressure, it too attracted a hail of gunfire from Dai Dong (2). Certain that he had found some portion of the 22nd Regiment, Tolson turned the action over to Rattan. Rattan dispatched Company B from the 1st Battalion, 8th Cavalry, and a mechanized platoon from Company A of the 1st Battalion, 50th Infantry, to investigate further. The resulting Battle of Tam Quan from 6-20 December resulted in 650+ PAVN killed (US body count) and 31 captured for losses of 58 US and 30 ARVN killed.

On 14 December, Tolson turned his attention to the 3rd Division's 2nd Regiment, which had moved from the Cay Giep Mountains on the lower edge of the Bồng Sơn Plain to the Nui Mieu Mountains, 10 km to the south, to attack government outposts on the northern Phu My Plain. That day, the 93rd Battalion from the 2nd Regiment tried to overrun Truong Xuan hamlet and a Regional Forces compound. Soldiers from the ARVN 41st Regiment and a company from the 1st Battalion, 50th Infantry killed 115 PAVN and captured five. During the month-long campaign that followed, the 2nd Brigade, 1st Cavalry Division, continued to work closely with the ARVN 41st Regiment in pursuing the 2nd Regiment. The allies scored some notable victories, including a strike against the regiment’s headquarters that killed either the regimental commander or his deputy. Between 2 and 4 January 1968, elements of the 1st Battalion, 50th Infantry, and two companies from the 1st Battalion, 5th Cavalry, trapped part of the 95th and 97th Battalions and a rear service company from the 2nd Regiment in a seaside hamlet just south of the Cay Giep Mountains. The action cost the PAVN 97 dead. By mid-January, the allied operations against the 2nd Regiment had reduced its strength by more than 500 men, or one-third of its original total. According to the official history of the PAVN 3rd Division, between September 1967 and January 1968, their units on the northeastern coast of II Corps "suffered [so] many reverses and casualties... that heavy infiltration of North Vietnamese Army troops was still not enough to fill the gaps." Success in the lowlands convinced Westmoreland that he could safely transfer the 1st Brigade of the 1st Cavalry Division from Bình Định Province to northern I Corps nearly a month ahead of schedule.

== Aftermath ==
The division officially terminated Operation Pershing on 17 January 1968 when the 1st Brigade began moving north by air and by sea. The division's 2nd Brigade remained in Bình Định for the time being to continue the search for the 3rd Division, a mission now called Operation Pershing II, under the direction of I Field Force headquarters. Westmoreland was taking a gamble by leaving the province so thinly defended, but he judged that northern I Corps rather than the central coast would be the theater of decision in the coming weeks.

In conjunction with Pershing from 26 May 1967 to 27 January 1968 the 1st Cavalry Division, ARVN and the South Vietnamese 816th National Police Field Force Battalion conducted Operation Dragnet to root out the VC infrastructure in Bình Định. US claimed 223 VC were killed and 944 suspected VC were detained, while US losses were 12 killed.

According to PAVN, they were victorious, and the 3rd Division eliminated more than 5,000 enemy troops (killed, wounded or captured).^{:chapter 4}
