= Operation Thayer =

Part of the Vietnam War (1966)

Operation Thayer, Irving and Thayer II
- Part of Vietnam War
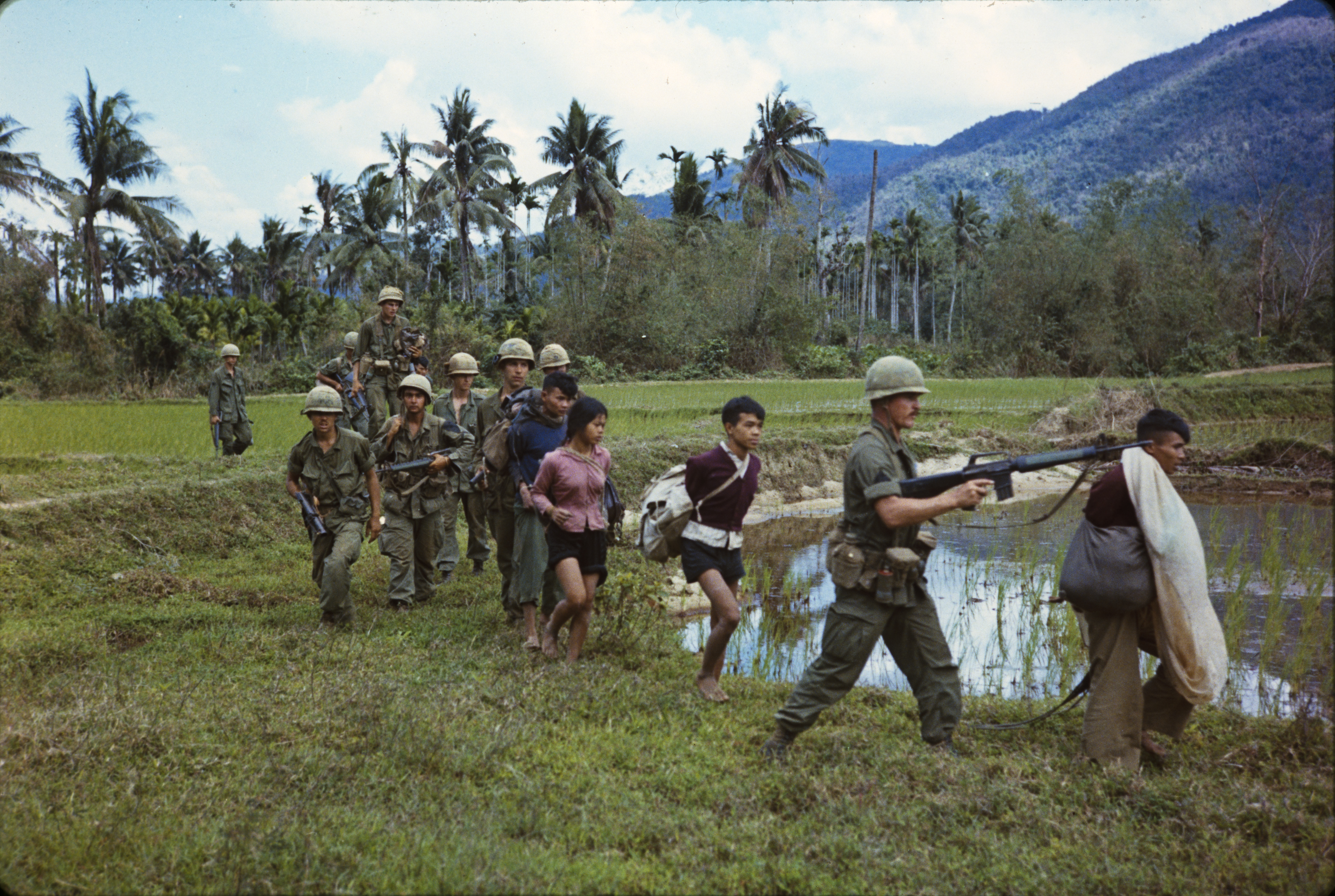
- 1st Cavalry Division soldiers with Vietcong prisoners
Date	13 September 1966 – 12 February 1967 (4 months, 4 weeks and 2 days)
Location	Bình Định Province, South Vietnam 14.129°N 108.831°E

Belligerents
United States; South Vietnam; South Korea	Viet Cong; North Vietnam

Commanders and leaders
(United States) MG John Norton	Col Le Truc

Units involved
(United States) 1st Cavalry Division (South Vietnam) 22nd Division (South Korea) Capital Division	3rd Division

Casualties and losses
Operation Thayer: (United States) 35 killed and missing Operation Irving: 52 killed Operation Thayer II: (United States) 242 killed 947 wounded South Vietnam unknown South Korea unknown Per PAVN claim: 1,800+ killed or wounded^{:chapter 4}	2,669 killed Operation Thayer: 231 killed Operation Irving: 681 killed and 1,409 captured Operation Thayer II: 1,757 killed
- Estimated 129,202 civilians displaced, one-third of province

Operation Thayer (13 September 1966 – 1 October 1966), Operation Irving (2 October 1966 – 24 October 1966) and Operation Thayer II (24 October 1966 – 11 February 1967) were related operations with the objective of eliminating People's Army of Vietnam (PAVN) and Viet Cong (VC) influence in Bình Định Province on the central coast of South Vietnam. The operations were carried out primarily by the United States (US) 1st Cavalry Division against PAVN and VC regiments believed to be in Bình Định. South Korean and Army of the Republic of Vietnam (ARVN) forces also took part in the operation.

The sustained operations were deemed a success by the US, which claimed that more than 2,500 PAVN/VC killed at a loss of about 329 American dead. Many areas under PAVN/VC influence were abandoned by the rural population as non-combatants fled the fighting or were forced by American and South Vietnamese forces to leave their homes. The PAVN/VC were able to break up into smaller units and evade open-battle against an overwhelming air-land-sea deployment of US forces, and much like in Operation Masher which preceded it, they were able to return and contest the region once the operation had died down.

== Background ==
Bình Định Province, on the central coast of South Vietnam, was a long-time communist stronghold with the VC, and increasingly the PAVN, controlling most of the rural areas. Bình Định, with a population of about 875,000, was characterized by a heavily populated narrow coastal plain out of which rose several mountain massifs. Inland, the many rivers ran through narrow valleys separated by heavily forested mountains. The area of the province was 2,326 square miles (6,020 km^{2}). The ARVN controlled little more than the larger towns and Highway 1, the main north–south thoroughfare of South Vietnam, and Highway 19 which led from the coast to the highland city of Pleiku.

The 1st Cavalry Division began operations against VC and PAVN forces in Bình Định shortly after its arrival in South Vietnam in September 1965. From its base at Camp Radcliff near An Khe, Gia Lai Province, the 1st Cavalry had launched operations several operations into nearby Bình Định Province which resulted in large numbers of PAVN/VC soldiers being killed in search and destroy missions, but, with the withdrawal of US forces from the province after each incursion, the PAVN/VC quickly reestablished their control or influence over many rural areas in the province.

On the night of 3 September 1966 a VC platoon launched a mortar attack on Camp Radcliff. The base was hit by 119 mortar rounds over a 5-minute period, killing 4 soldiers and wounding 76, while 77 out of the 1st Cavalry's 400-plus helicopters were damaged. The VC were believed to have escaped. In early September, the PAVN/VC also attacked several ARVN military bases and ambushed an ARVN convoy. The attacks illustrated the fragility of the control of the area by the South Vietnamese government and the need to suppress the PAVN/VC forces.

Operation Thayer and follow-on operations Irving and Thayer II were called the "Binh Dinh Province Pacification Campaign" and had the objective "to clean up, once and for all, all regular PAVN/VC units in the area as well as uprooting the long established VC infrastructure."

== Operation Thayer ==
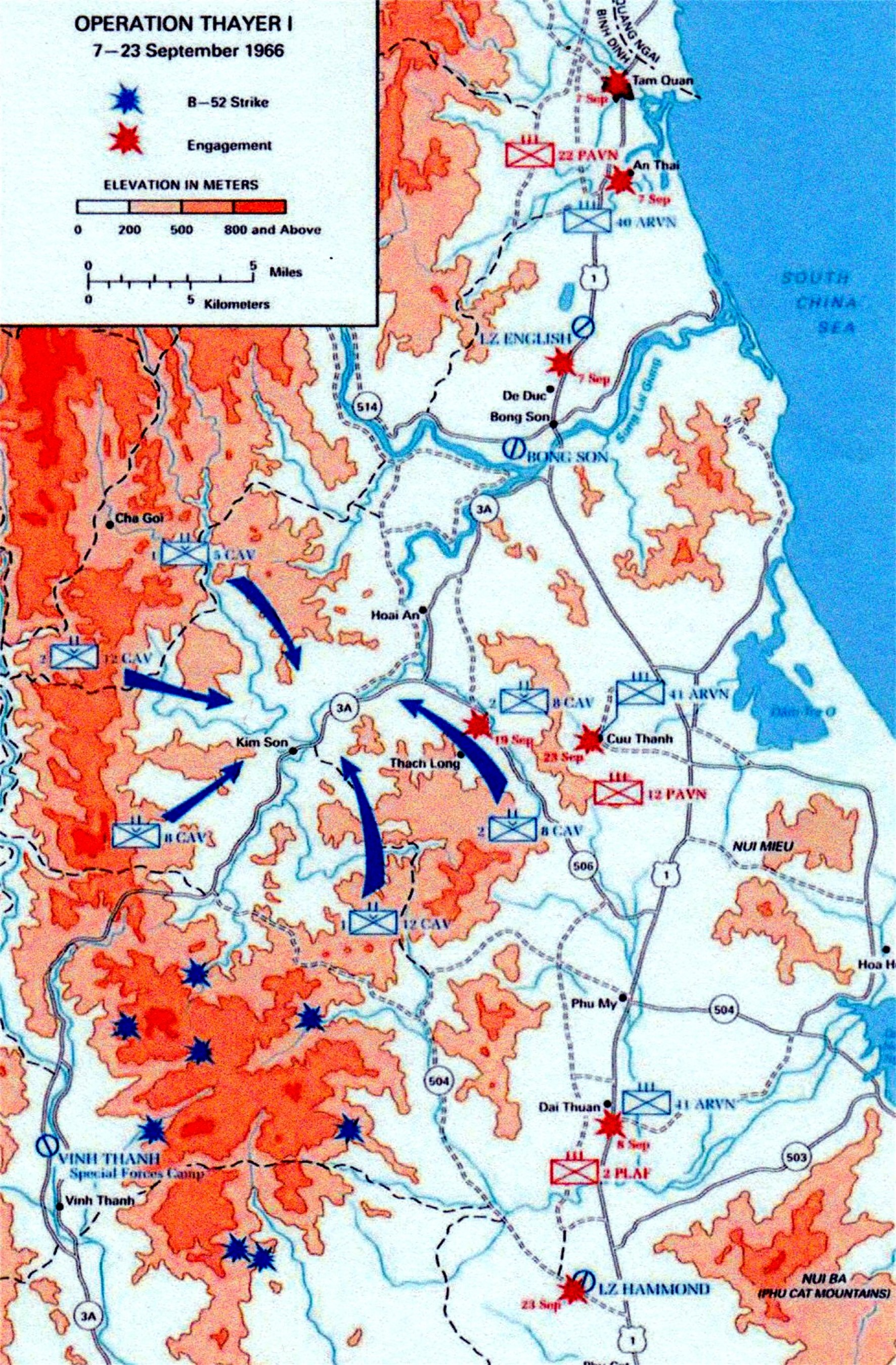
The area of Operation Thayer, Binh Dinh Province, South Vietnam.

Operation Thayer was the largest air assault undertaken up until that time in the Vietnam War. The focus of Operation Thayer was the Kim Son Valley where seven small rivers, separated by mountains, came together in what the Americans called the Crow's Foot. The 1st Cavalry had previously encountered stiff resistance in the Crow's foot during Operation Masher in February 1966. It now appeared that the PAVN/VC had re-established their base areas. After two days of B-52 air strikes near the valley, on 13–14 September General John Norton airlifted 5 battalions into the highlands surrounding the Kim Son valley. The Americans then descended into the valleys, hoping to catch large numbers of PAVN/VC in their net. They found few enemies to fight, but determined that the PAVN/VC forces in the Kim Son valley had escaped to the east.

Operation Thayer ended on 1 October. The Americans claimed to have killed 231 PAVN/VC at a loss to themselves of 35 dead and missing. Contrasting the success of this operation, was S.L.A. Marshall who privately declared that Operation Thayer I was a "complete bust", that artillery was shooting at "clay pipes" that the enemy was "either not there or so adroit and clever" as to completely avoid US search-and-destroy and that from first-hand observation that the 231 killed was a complete fabrication.

== Operation Irving ==
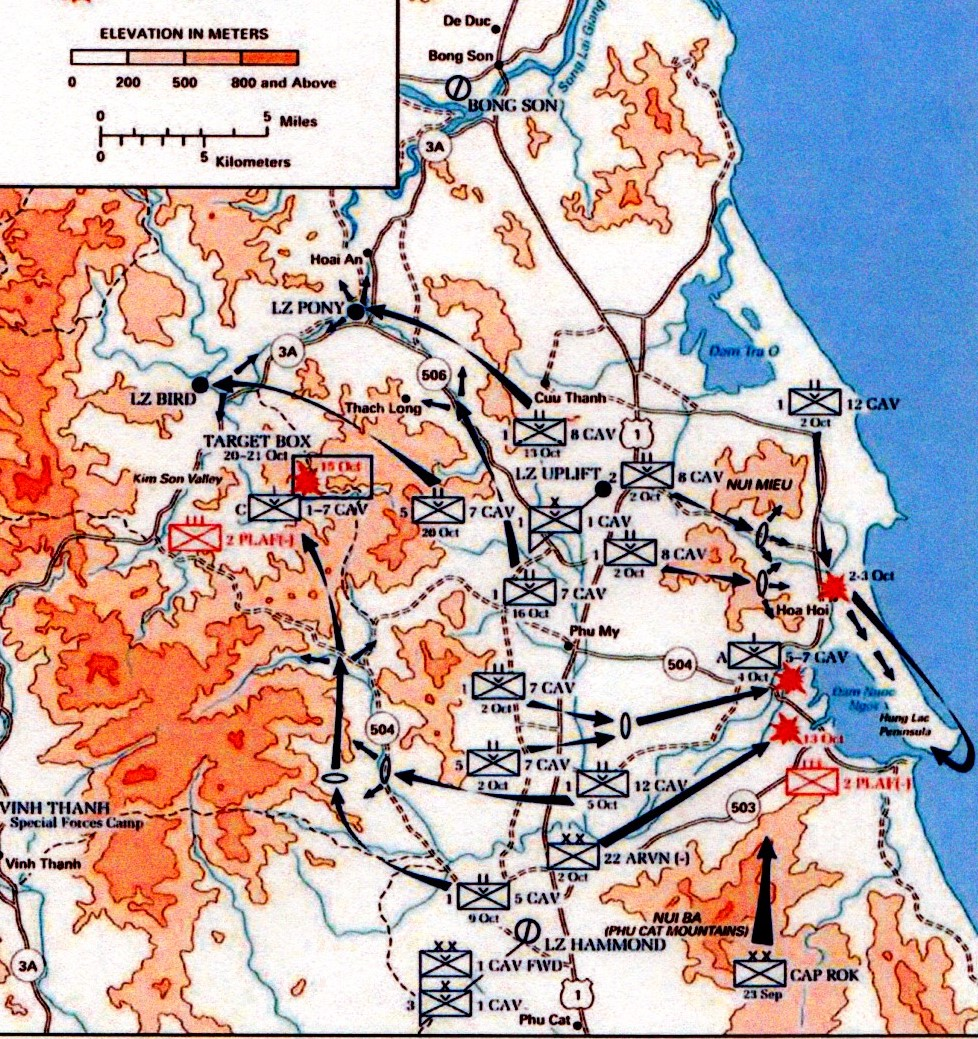
Operation Irving, October 1966

Operation Irving immediately followed Operation Thayer. The focus of the offensive moved east to the small mountain ranges near the coast of Bình Định where the PAVN 12th Regiment which had fled the Kim Son Valley was believed to be. To "find, fix, and finish" the PAVN Norton had five American, five South Korean and 2 South Vietnamese battalions, a total of some 6,000 men. Each national contingent would search a different mountain massif rising more than 1,000 feet (300 m) out of the coastal plain over a north–south area of more than 15 miles (24 km) and extending more than 5 miles (8.0 km) inland from the sea. The allied forces attempted to prevent the PAVN/VC from exfiltrating this area.

A problem faced in Operation Irving was the large number of non-combatants, mostly farmers, in the heavily populated coastal area. Leaflets and radio programs instructed the civilians to stay put in their villages or if caught in a battle for the village to leave only in the direction of allied soldiers.

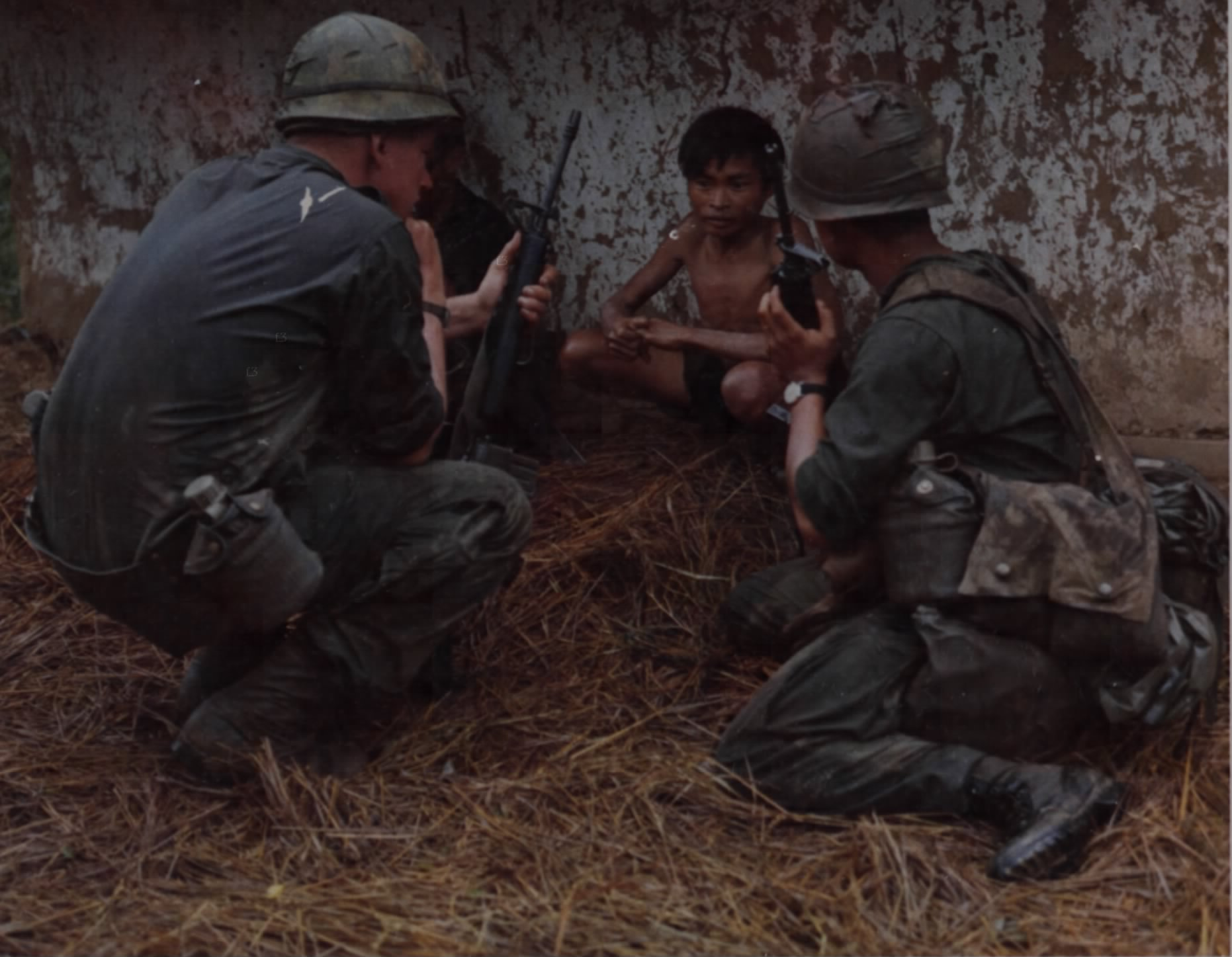
Captain Harold T. Fields, "A" Company, 1st Battalion, 12th Infantry and interpreter question Vietnamese man during Operation Irving, 6 October 1966

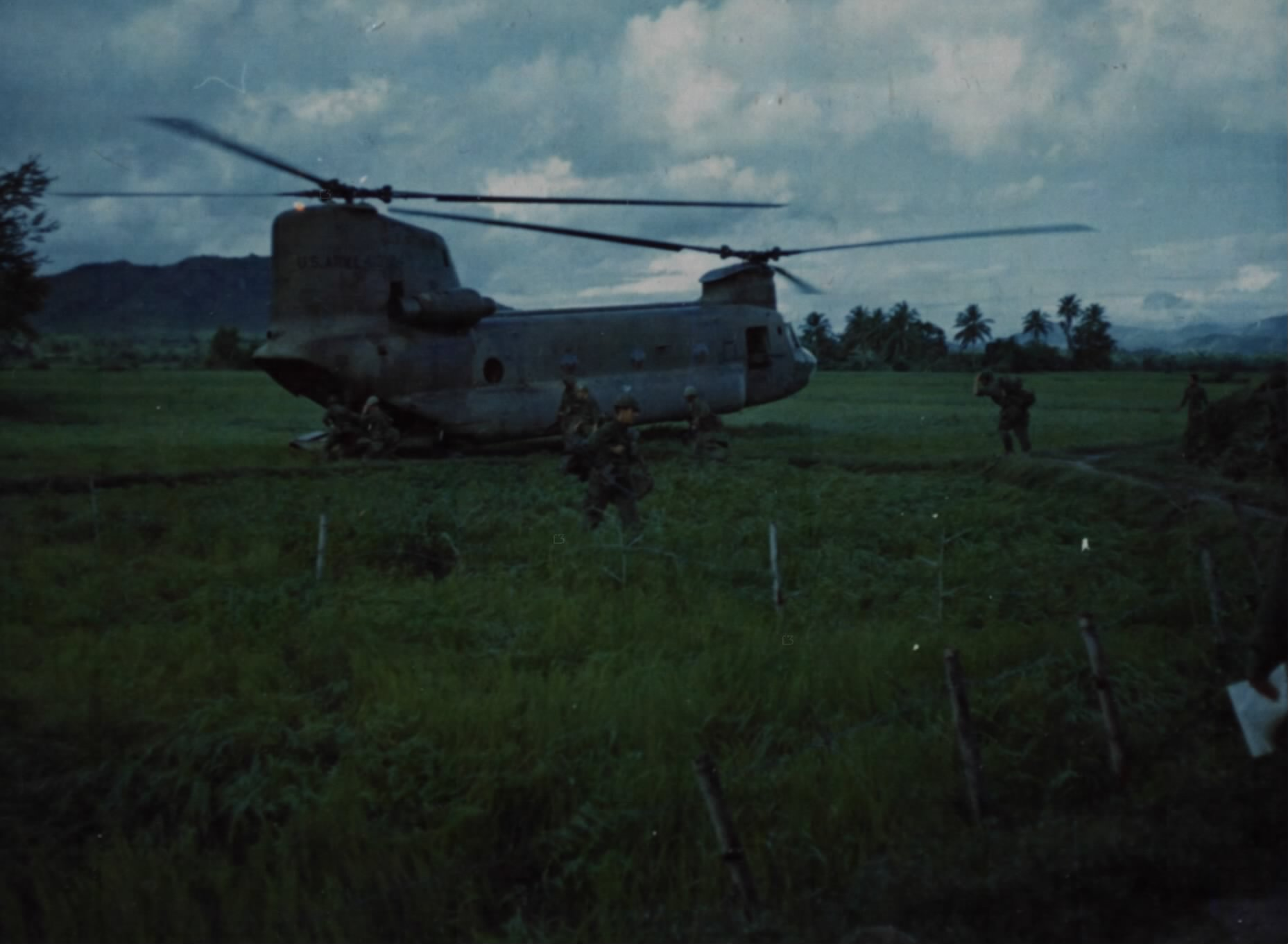
A CH-47 picks up troops from A Company, 1st Battalion, 8th Cavalry, 10 October

Operation Irving had an immediate success on 2 October. The Americans observed PAVN/VC in the village of Hoa Hoi, near the coast, and sent in by helicopter a platoon-sized group to investigate. The platoon took heavy fire and suffered casualties and reinforcements were rushed to the area to encircle the village. Villagers were offered the opportunity to leave Hoa Hoi and about 200 did. Nightfall came before an attack could be organized. The US Navy offshore fired illumination shells all night to prevent the PAVN from escaping through the American lines.

The next morning two American companies advanced on the village from the north, forcing the PAVN to either stand and fight or to attempt to break through the Americans lines encircling the village. The American attackers searched and destroyed the village and rooted out the PAVN. By the end of the day, the battle was over. The Americans claimed to have killed 233 PAVN and taken 35 prisoners out of a total force of 300 men. American losses were six dead.

Following the successful Hoa Hoi battle, the 1st Cavalry searched for additional PAVN/VC forces, shifting the focus westward to the mountainous Kim Son and Suoi Ca valleys. The South Korean and South Vietnamese forces also clashed with the PAVN/VC, the South Vietnamese, with US helicopter gunship support, accounting for 135 PAVN/VC in a battle on 13 October. The Allied forces, however, could not find and bring to battle large elements of PAVN/VC.

Operation Irving was declared a great success, with the Allies claiming they had killed 681 PAVN/VC and captured 1,409 with losses to the allies of 52 dead The US accounted for 681 of those killed, while suffering 19 dead. The success of this operation contrasted with previous ones, but this was described as "result of a fluke shot" rather than a deliberate search and destroy, noting the previous battles in which the US rarely had tactical or strategic initiative against the PAVN/VC.

== Operation Thayer II ==
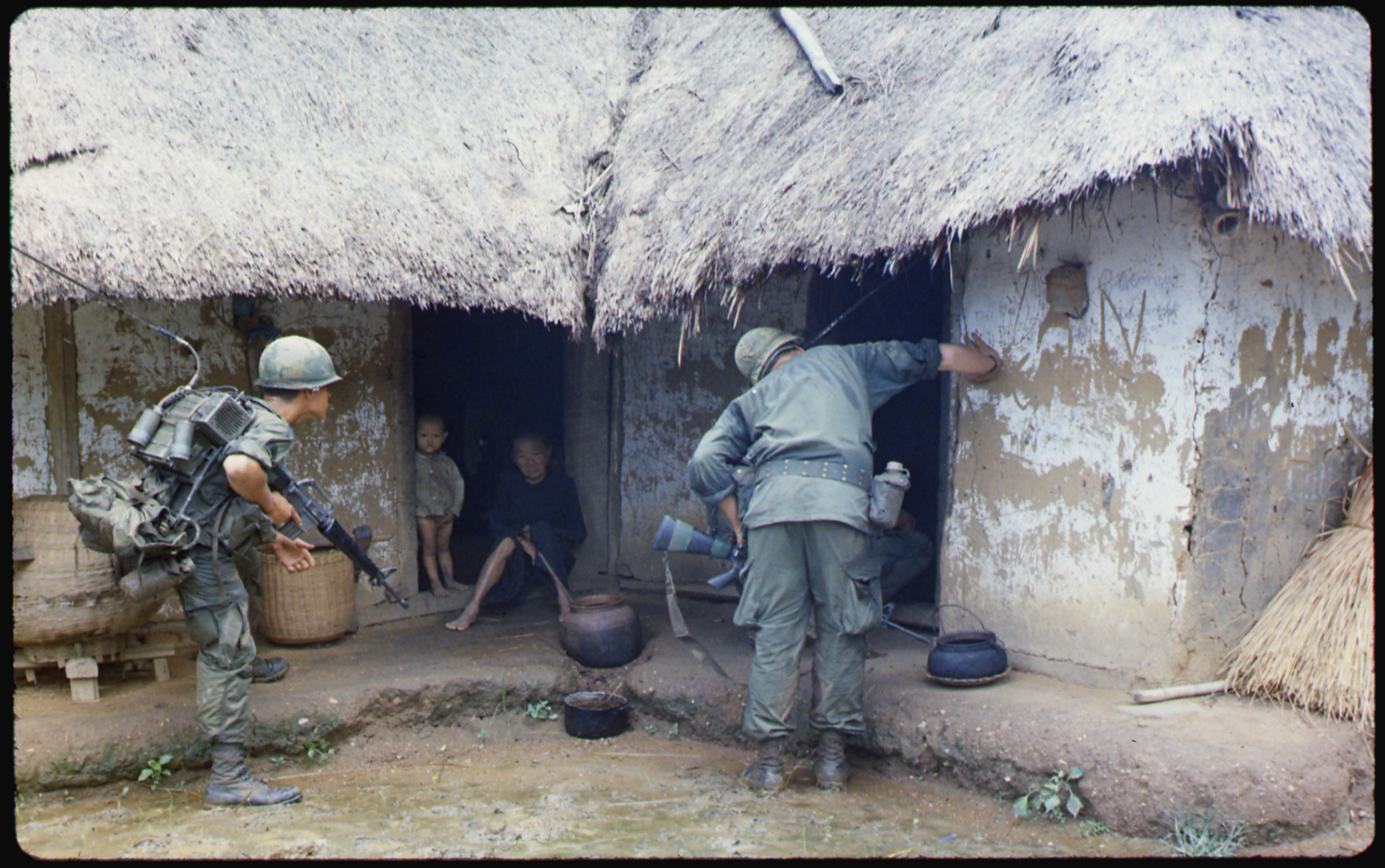
1st Cavalry troops search a house during Operation Thayer II

Operation Thayer was focused on searching the Kim Son valley and southwards to the Suoi Ca Valley for PAVN/VC, which were believed to have broken into smaller units due to the successes of Operation Irving. The operation was hampered by heavy monsoon rains which impacted both American and PAVN/VC forces. In early December the decision was taken to empty the Kim Son Valley of its non-combatants and declare it a free fire zone in which any unidentified person was considered to be a combatant and unrestricted artillery and air strikes were permitted. About 1,100 people were forced or enabled to leave the valley. Many others chose to stay, either because they were VC loyalists or refused to abandon their homes and land. On December 17, American forces fought a battle east of the Kim Son valley, killing 95 PAVN/VC at a cost of 34 American dead and three helicopters shot down.

The PAVN/VC demonstrated they were still capable of offensive action with an attack on Firebase Bird in the contested Kim Son Valley. The firebase had been hurriedly constructed and, due to a Christmas truce, had less than one-half of its authorized manpower present. Bird was occupied by C Battery 6th Battalion, 16th Artillery and B Battery, 2nd Battalion, 19th Artillery and defended by elements of the 1st Battalion, 12th Cavalry. On the early morning of 27 December after preparatory mortar fire Bird was attacked by 3 Battalions of the 22nd Regiment. The PAVN quickly breached the perimeter and occupied all the 155mm and some of the 105mm gun pits. The remaining guns of 2/19 Artillery were then used to fire Beehive rounds directly at the PAVN stopping the attack. Supporting artillery fire was called in from nearby Firebase Pony (14.312°N 108.967°E) and helicopter gunships also arrived to give supporting fire, forcing the PAVN to retreat The 1st Cavalry sent in a battalion of troops to pursue the retreating attackers. US losses in the attack were 27 dead and 67 wounded. The US estimated that PAVN/VC losses in the attack and pursuit were 267 dead.

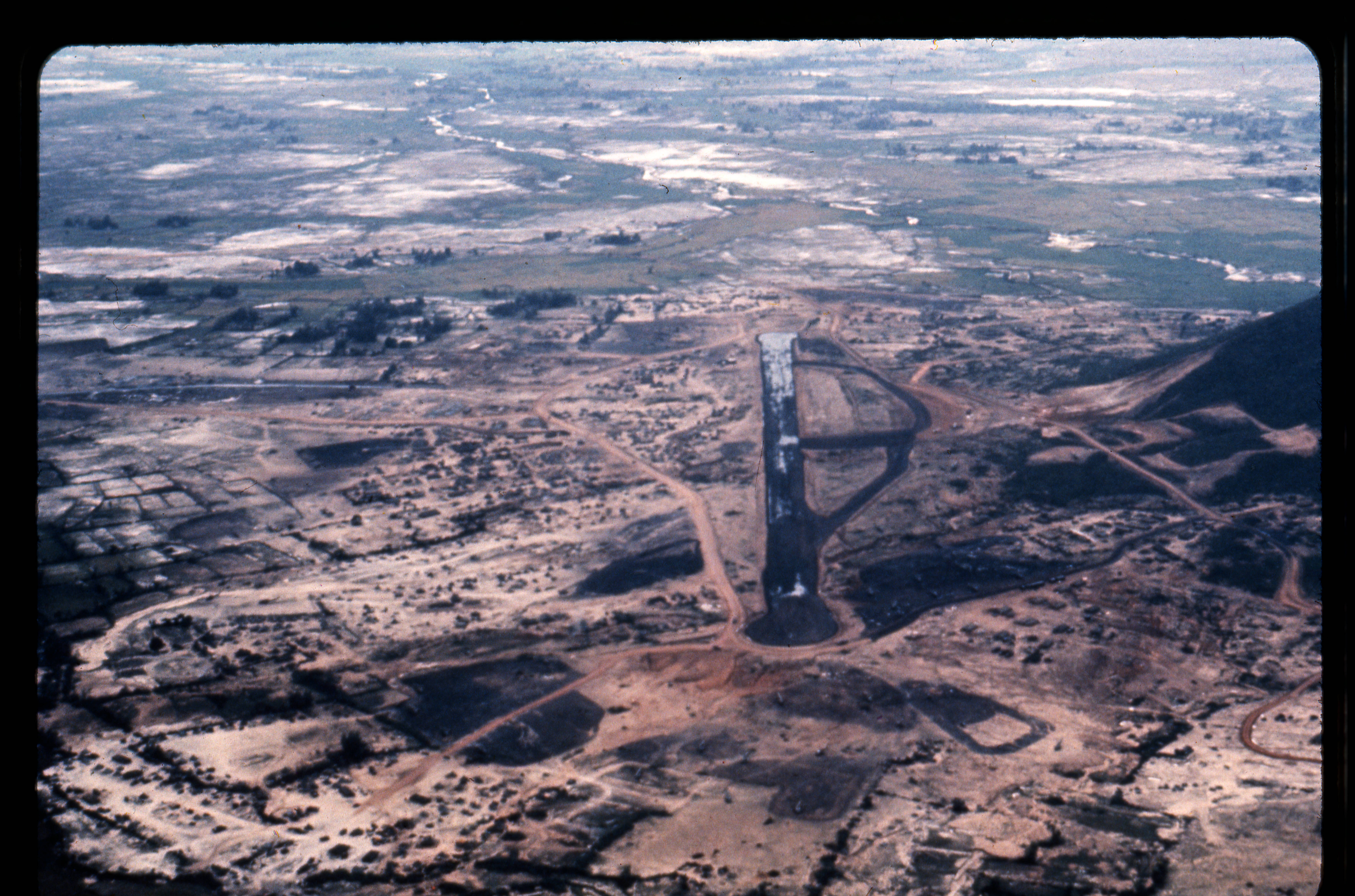
LZ Hammond, 9 November 1966

To prepare for the move into northern Bình Định, General Norton continued to consolidate his position farther south during Thayer II. He assigned Colonel James Shanahan's newly arrived 3rd Brigade, 25th Infantry Division to the Suoi Ca and Vinh Thanh Valleys, regions known to contain an important enemy trail complex. Norton retained his 1st Brigade in the Kim Son Valley and assigned his 2nd Brigade responsibility for the Cay Giep and Mieu Mountains in the northern sector. To improve control of these forces, on 9 January he established a forward division command post at LZ Hammond (14.076°N 109.044°E), 40 km northwest of Qui Nhon.

On 19 January in the Suoi Ca Valley, patrols from one of Shanahan's units, the 1st Battalion, 14th Infantry Regiment, discovered a series of caves among large granite boulders. Double- and triple-canopied vegetation hid the caves from aerial observation. They turned out to be the VC political headquarters for Bình Định Province. The Americans heard the voices of women and children coming from one cave and ordered them out. When there was no response, a company commander and one of his sergeants crept in and found themselves in a large cavern. The company commander was shot dead and the sergeant dragged the body out. Immediately, the battalion commander, Lt. Col. William H. Miller, had his men surround the area and used Tear gas and smoke grenades to flush out the cave. As the smoke swirled, the VC fired rifles and lobbed grenades out of the entrance. Only after flamethrowers depleted the oxygen and suffocated those within did the resistance end.

Miller's men cautiously entered the cave and discovered many connecting tunnels that led to exits and storage areas for food, equipment, and ammunition. They found an unusual collection of records, including a complete local order of battle; personnel rosters; weapons and equipment lists; ammunition supply status reports; and a map showing the locations of caches throughout the province. The Americans also uncovered several ARVN documents, some classified, containing information about allied installations. One, classified "Top Secret" by the South Vietnamese, listed all radio frequencies and call signs for the province's paramilitary forces. After the caves were thoroughly searched, engineers detonated charges in one cave, causing massive secondary explosions that blew a gap 100m long in the side of a hill. Over the next several days, repeated attempts to destroy the rest of the complex were only partially successful, so the engineers finally settled for sealing the entrances. In all, eight major complexes were either closed or destroyed.

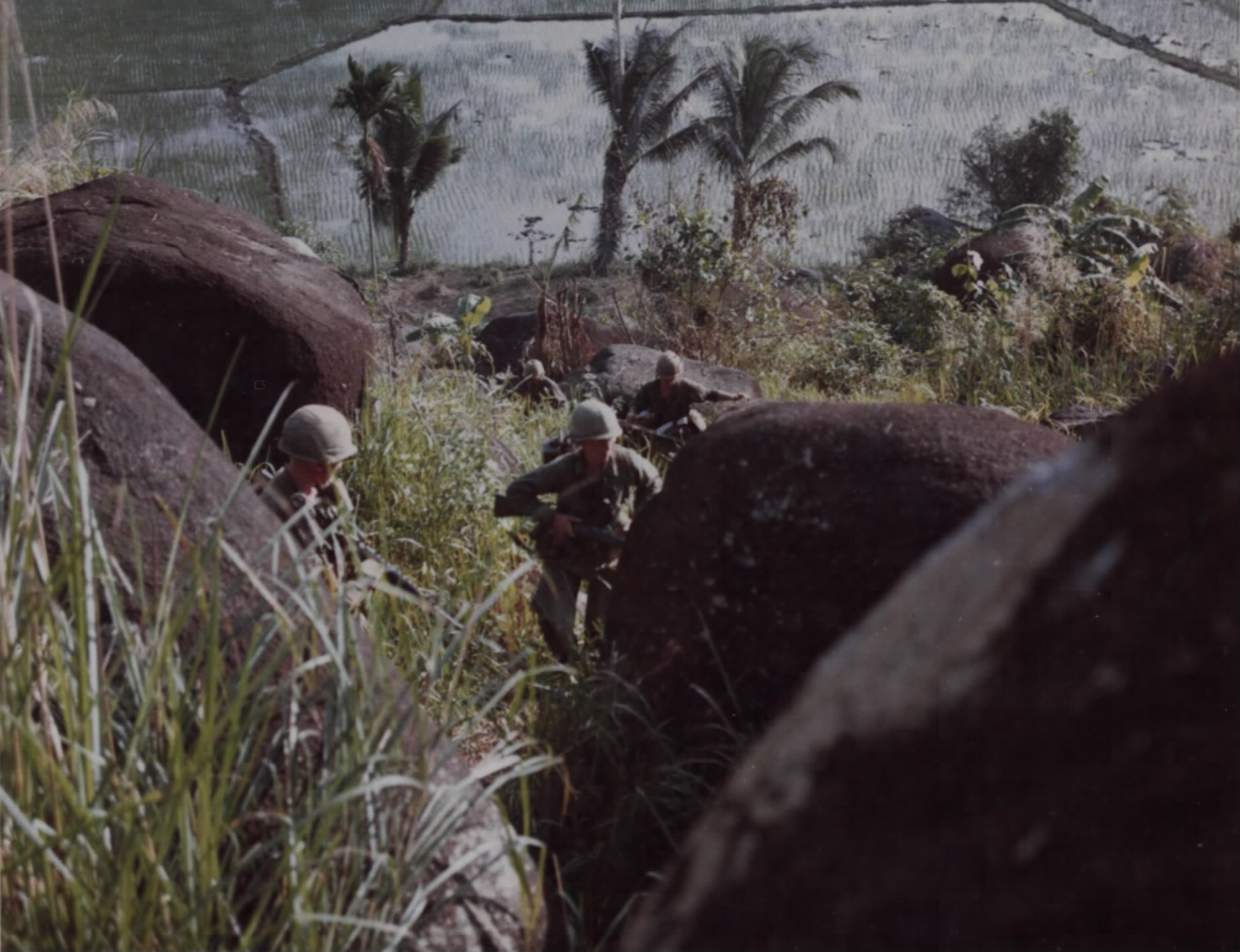
Company A, 1st Battalion, 5th Cavalry, 6 February 1967

Bad weather hindered both combat and logistical operations. The main supply route for the 1st Cavalry Division during Thayer II had extended north from Qui Nhơn over Highway 1 to LZ Hammond. In December a second supply base was built at Landing Zone English, on the southern Bồng Sơn Plain, just 5 km north of the Lai Giang, to support the 2nd Brigade. Washouts along Highway 1 between Hammond and English late in December, however, made the road impassable until 10 January, forcing the 2nd Brigade to depend on aerial delivery at English's hastily constructed runway. A combination of heavy rain and air traffic soon reduced the top layer of earth under the airstrip's steel matting to a thin mud that squirted up through the mesh and obscured the pilots' vision and made the runway extremely slippery. Deep ruts quickly developed underneath the steel surface, forcing the partial closure of the aerial supply terminal throughout January. Because of English's unreliability as a fixed-wing supply base, the 1st Cavalry Division increased its normal three-day stockage level at Hammond to five days as insurance against heavy rains washing out the roads. It also stationed CH-47 Chinooks at Hammond to transport any logistical shortfall forward to English. Norton decided against moving farther north until English became fully operational and had a dependable runway. Instead, while waiting for resolution of his logistical challenges, he directed his 2nd Brigade to support ARVN 22nd Division operations around English.

During the last two weeks of January the ARVN fought two major battles against the 7th and 8th Battalions of the 22nd Regiment and, with timely American assistance, claimed to have killed or captured over 250 PAVN. Then, on 2 February Norton received an agent report indicating that two PAVN battalions would attack Pony, an American firebase in the northern Kim Son Valley, sometime during the next seven days. In view of what had happened at Bird in the same general area, Norton reacted quickly and airlifted the 3rd Brigade headquarters with one battalion from Camp Radcliff to Pony. Another intelligence source, a defector from the 9th Battalion, 22nd Regiment, revealed that his unit was understrength but had plenty of ammunition and was planning to attack English after the Têt truce, between 8 and 12 February. Norton strengthened the base's defenses and deployed additional 2nd Brigade units around it. A third piece of information, this provided by US signal intelligence, pinpointed the command post of the PAVN 3rd Division in the An Lao Valley. Capturing such an important target would be a significant coup, and Norton sent an entire battalion to locate and destroy it. Although unable to find the actual headquarters, the American force came upon a major PAVN supply base containing several tons of food and supplies. On 6 February the ARVN 40th Regiment, 22nd Division, met a PAVN battalion 4 km north of English and routed it in a short, violent fight. Accompanying US advisers reported counting over 100 PAVN dead.

Still able to strike back, however, early the next morning the PAVN mortared English, killing or wounding 52 soldiers and damaging 5 helicopters. Although the PAVN probed the perimeter, they did not follow up with a ground assault. An uneasy, five-day Têt truce began at 08:00 on 8 February. Unconfirmed reports still predicted a PAVN attack against English, during or immediately after the truce. Meanwhile, US reconnaissance units, both ground and air, venturing near the base, continued to draw fire. That afternoon an enemy force of unknown size attacked an American unit in the Mieu Mountains between English and Hammond. The 2nd Brigade pursued with two battalions but failed to make contact. Throughout these inconclusive engagements, General Norton impatiently waited at his new command post at Landing Zone Two Bits, 3 km south of English, for the truce to end. During Thayer II, which now had lasted about two and a half months before officially ending on 12 February 1967, he had steadily worn down the 3rd Division, driving its 2nd Regiment out of Bình Định Province and severely damaging its 18th and 22nd Regiments. Altogether, his troops had reported killing 1757 PAVN/VC, while 242 Americans were killed, and 947 wounded. Now they found themselves sitting idle, while the rest of the division either fled from their grasp or seemed prepared to strike back.

== Refugees ==
Operations Thayer, Irving, and Thayer II displaced a large number of people in Bình Định Province. At the end of 1966, the province had 85 refugee camps with a reported population of 129,202. Additional people displaced by the war crowded into towns and villages or lived as squatters along Highway 1. About one-third of the 875,000 people of Bình Định were displaced in 1966 by the war. In some instances the displacement of people by the U.S. and South Vietnam was deliberate, forcing people to leave the Kim Son and An Lao valleys and declaring them free fire zones.

While the U.S. portrayed the refugee movement as people "fleeing communism", U.S. Department of Defense studies showed that the most important cause of refugees was US and South Vietnamese "bombing and artillery fire, in conjunction with ground operations." The response of the governments of South Vietnam and the US to meet the needs of the refugees was inadequate. The refugee camps themselves were often hotbeds of discontent and VC activity. Some refugee camps were considered unsafe for South Vietnamese government officials to visit without military escorts.

The generation of refugees was considered a sign of progress in the war to some in the US "The influx [of refugees] has had the favorable effect of denying the VC a needed labor and agricultural force, and of decreasing the manpower base from which to impress recruits" said a U.S. Marine Corps report. The U.S. Department of State suggested that the generation of refugees might be a good idea in some cases. However, another Department of Defense report said that "Refugee movement is highly visible evidence of the failure of the government to protect the rural population from the Viet-Cong."
