= Landing Zone Two Bits =

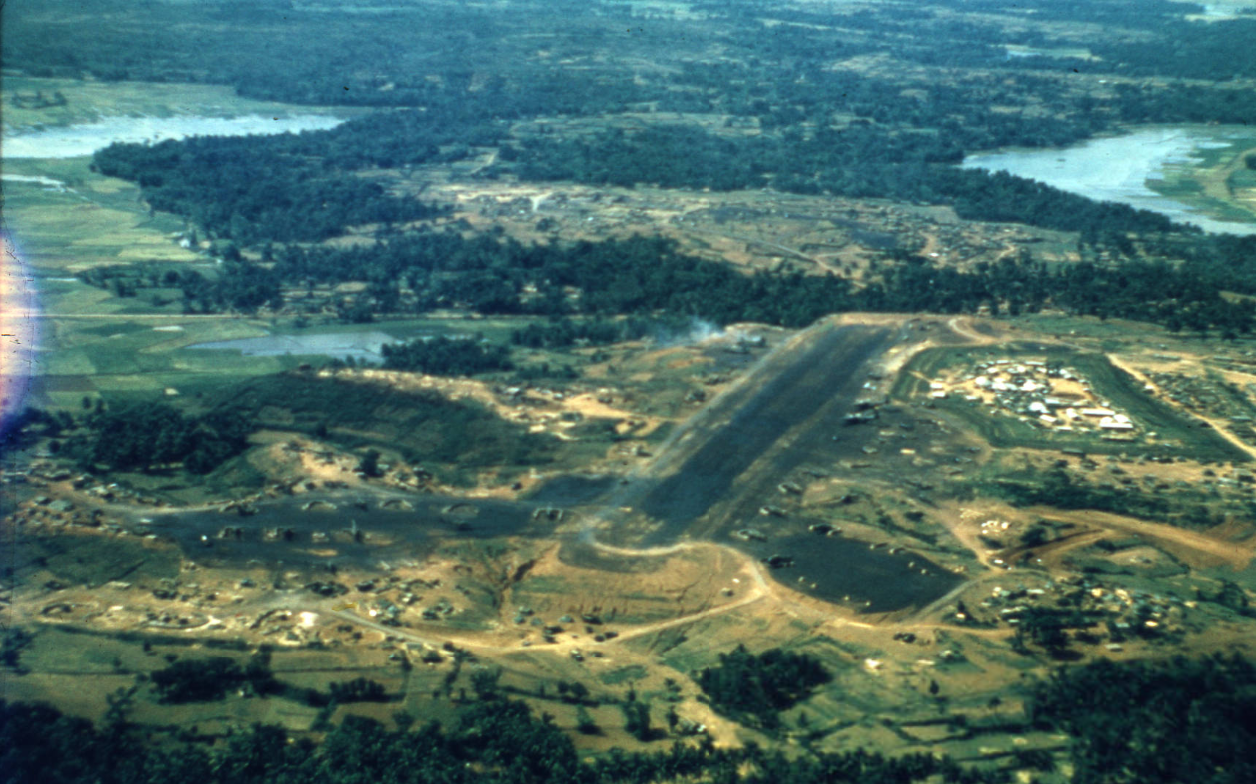
- LZ Two Bits, 24 April 1967

Site information
- Type: Army

Location
- Coordinates: 14.4197°N 109.0°E

Site history
- Built: 1967
- In use: 1967-9
- Battles/wars: Vietnam War

Garrison information
- Occupants: 1st Cavalry Division; 4th Infantry Division

Airfield information
- IATA: none; ICAO: none

Summary

Landing Zone Two Bits (also known as FSB Two Bits) was a U.S. Army and Army of the Republic of Vietnam (ARVN) base located in the Bồng Sơn region northeast of An Khe, Bình Định Province in central Vietnam.

The base was located near the intersection of Highway 1 and Highway 514, approximately 50 km northeast of An Khe.

== History ==
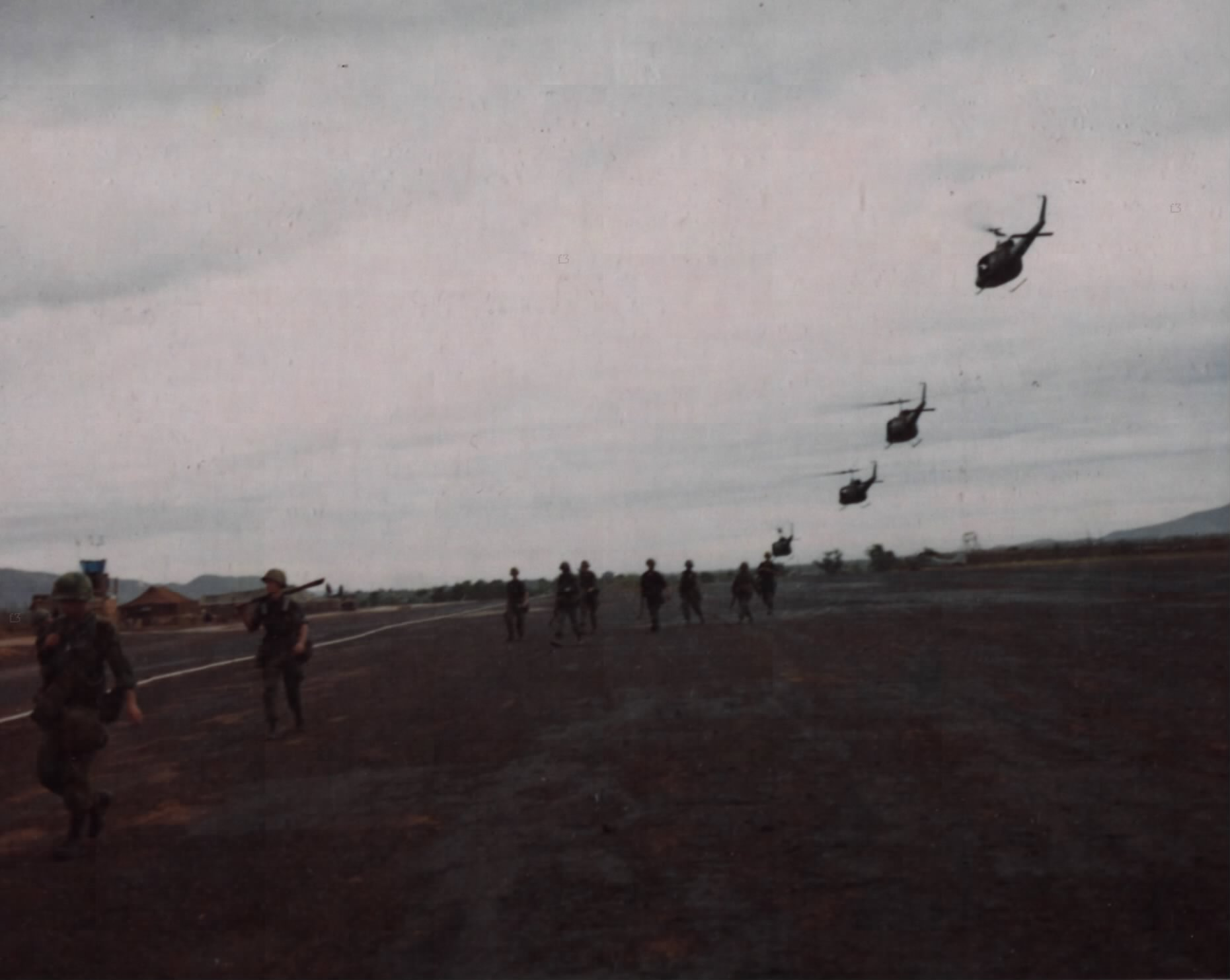
Members of the Blue (rifle) Platoon, Troop B, 1st Squadron, 9th Cavalry, walk to their billets after being dropped off by UH-1Ds at Landing Zone Two Bits, 28 July 1967

Two Bits was established in July 1967 as the forward command post of the 1st Cavalry Division and together with Landing Zone English, remained in use by the division until they moved into I Corps in January 1968.

The 3rd Brigade, 4th Infantry Division, comprising:

- 1st Battalion, 14th Infantry
- 1st Battalion, 35th Infantry
- 2nd Battalion, 35th Infantry
- 1st Battalion, 50th Infantry

was based here from March-April 1968.

Other units based here included:

- 7th Battalion, 13th Artillery (1967-October 1969)
- 1st Battalion, 30th Artillery (April 1967-February 1968)
- 5th Maintenance Battalion
- 534th Signal Company

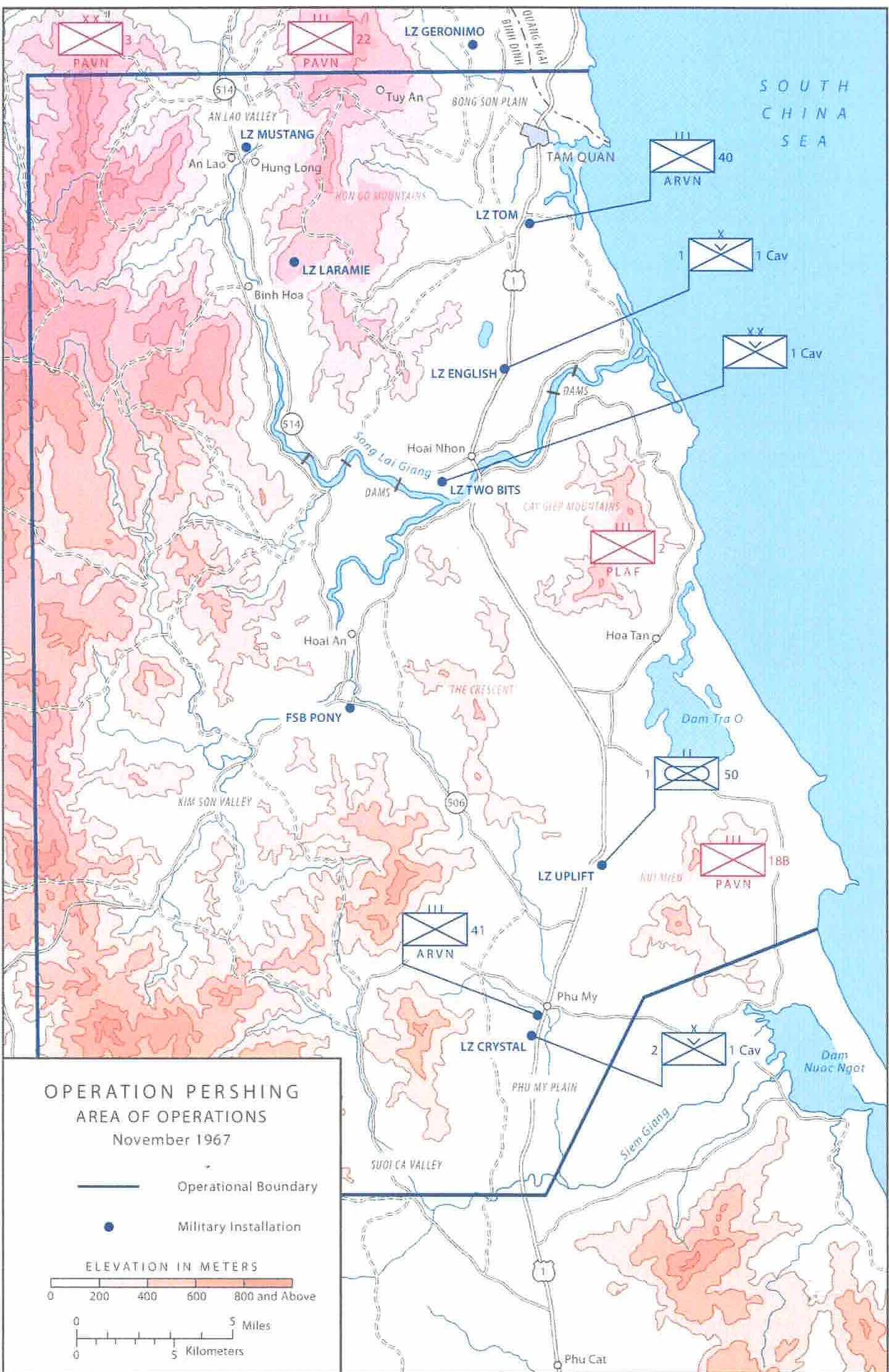
LZ Two Bits and neighboring LZs in Operation Pershing

In Operation Pershing, troops of the 1st Cavalry Division repelled an attack by the 22nd Regiment of the PAVN 3rd Division at the base on 25 August 1967, after repelling another attack by the 22nd Regiment at the neighboring LZ English three days earlier.
