= General Norton =

General Norton may refer to:

- Chapple Norton (1746–1818), British Army lieutenant general
- Edward F. Norton (1884–1954), British Army lieutenant general
- George Norton (fl. 1984–2020), British Army major general
- John Norton (soldier) (1918–2004), U.S. Army lieutenant general

== See also ==
- Attorney General Norton (disambiguation)
