= Operation Davy Crockett =

1966 Vietnam War operation

- Part of the Vietnam War
Date	1–16 May 1966
Location	Bong Son, South Vietnam 11.2631°N 106.334°E

Belligerents
United States	North Vietnam

Commanders and leaders
Col. Hal Moore	unknown

Units involved
1st Cavalry Division: 3rd Brigade	22nd Regiment

Casualties and losses
28 killed	US claim 345 killed 192 estimated killed PAVN claim: 75 killed

Operation Davy Crockett was an operation during the Vietnam War, instigated by 3rd Brigade, 1st Cavalry Division. It took place near Bong Son, and lasted from 1–16 May 1966.

== Prelude ==
Following operations in the Central Highlands in March and April 1966, the 1st Cavalry Division returned to Bình Định Province in May. Intelligence indicated the presence of the People's Army of Vietnam (PAVN) 22nd Regiment, 3rd Division on the Bong Son plain and the 3rd Brigade, 1st Cavalry Division commanded by Col. Hal Moore was given the mission of engaging it.

== Operation ==
On the morning of 4 May, 1st Battalion, 7th Cavalry Regiment (1/7th Cavalry) and the 2nd Battalion, 7th Cavalry Regiment (2/7th Cavalry) were landed by helicopter to the north and west of the suspected location of the PAVN 22nd Regiment while the Army of the Republic of Vietnam (ARVN) 3rd Armored Cavalry Regiment established blocking positions to the east along Highway 1. The 1st Battalion, 9th Cavalry Regiment (1/9th Cavalry) supported by ARVN armor then attacked north. The first day's operation killed 15 PAVN soldiers and several were captured, however the bulk of the PAVN unit (identified later as being the 9th Battalion, 22nd Regiment) avoided the engagement.

At 13:50 on 5 May, Troop D, 1/9th Cavalry was engaged by heavy weapons fire from the hamlet of Binh De 2. Col. Moore ordered his units to create a cordon around Binh De 2 which would then be softened up by artillery in preparation for an assault the following day. However, when the assault began the next morning it was clear that the PAVN had left the area. Shortly afterwards, PAVN fire downed a 1/9th Cavalry helicopter near the village of Thanh Son 2, approximately 5 km south of Binh De 2. Col Moore again ordered a cordon to be established around Thanh Son 2 and 1/7th Cavalry attacked the village from the north but was repulsed. Air strikes were called in however many PAVN were able to withdraw at nightfall under the cover of heavy rain. The following morning the cavalry forces entered Thanh Son 2 and captured some stragglers including the 9th Battalion's Political Officer. Also on 7 May the 3rd Brigade was reinforced by the 1st Battalion, 5th Cavalry Regiment.

From 7–11 May, the reinforced 3rd Brigade conducted fruitless searches of the Bong Son plain, then on the 11th the 2/7th Cavalry was landed by helicopter into the Kim Son Valley, establishing Firebases Bird and Pony, while the 1/9th Cavalry conducted aerial reconnaissance. Several small engagements took place, but no sizable units were located and Col. Moore terminated the operation on 16 May.

== Aftermath ==
Total US casualties were 28 killed, while the US claimed that PAVN losses were 345 killed and a further 192 estimated killed. According to the PAVN, their losses were 75 killed
