= 3rd Division (Vietnam) =

3rd Infantry Division
- Active: 1965-present
- Allegiance: Vietnam
- Branch: People's Army of Vietnam
- Type: Infantry
- Size: Division
- Garrison/HQ: Bình Định Province (September 1965 - July 1976); Hà Bắc Province (July 1976 - July 1978); Lạng Sơn Province (since July 1978)
- Nickname: Yellow Star Division

Commanders
- Notable commanders: Giáp Văn Cương; Võ Thứ; Nguyễn Duy Thương

The 3rd Infantry Division also known as the Yellow Star Division is a division of the People's Army of Vietnam (PAVN), first formed from Viet Cong (VC) and PAVN units in September 1965. The first commanding officer and political officer of division were Colonel Giáp Văn Cương and Colonel Đặng Hòa respectively.^{:chapter 3}

== In Vietnam War ==
The Division was formed in September 1965 from the VC 2nd (An Lão) Regiment which had been active in Bình Định Province since 1962 and the newly arrived PAVN 12th and 22nd Regiments. (the 12th Regiment was derived from the 18th Regiment of the 325th Division)

On 18 September 1965 during the opening stage of Operation Gibraltar, elements of the US 2nd Battalion, 502nd Infantry Regiment and an Army of the Republic of Vietnam (ARVN) Ranger company were landed in the training base of the Division's 95th Battalion. During the ensuing battle, U.S. claimed 226-257 PAVN soldiers were killed.

The Division was the target of Operation Masher from 24 January to 6 March 1966. The PAVN claim that the Division's 407th Sapper Battalion attacked Camp Radcliff "eliminating 520 enemy troops and destroying 97 aircraft" while the Division artillery shelled a headquarters in Bồng Sơn "killing many enemy soldiers and destroying 10 aircraft."

The Division's 22nd Regiment was the target of Operation Davy Crockett from 1 to 16 May 1966, U.S. claimed 345 PAVN soldiers were killed.

The Division's 2nd Regiment was the target of Operation Crazy Horse from 16 May to 5 June 1966, U.S. claimed 478 PAVN soldiers were killed.

The Division and local VC units in Bình Định Province were the target of Operation Thayer from 13 September 1966 to 12 February 1967, with a US body count of 2,669 killed.

By April 1967 US intelligence assessed the Division as being combat ineffective with prisoners reporting low morale, lack of food and medical supplies and lack of confidence in their leadership. The Division retreated from Bình Định Province and its commander, Col Le Truc was replaced by Col Võ Thứ. (Note: There is no information about "Colonel Le Truc" in PAVN documents. "Chi đội Lê Trực" used to be alias of the 12th Regiment in the First Indochina War)

The Division was the target of Operation Pershing from September 1967 to January 1968. From 6–11 December 1967 the Division's 22nd Regiment was defeated in the Battle of Tam Quan, U.S. claimed 650 PAVN soldiers were killed and 31 captured.

On 23 January 1968 as the 2nd Regiment moved into a staging area several kilometers east of Phù Mỹ District in preparation for its Tet Offensive attacks, it was engaged by 2 Army of the Republic of Vietnam (ARVN) mechanized companies, losing 142 soldiers from the regiment's 95th and 97th Battalions. The 2nd Regiment attacked Phù Mỹ on the night of 30/1 January but were driven back and then both the 2nd and 22nd Regiments attempted further attacks before withdrawing on 6 February after losing a further 200 killed. In an attack on An Nhơn District on 6 February, the 8th Battalion, 18th Regiment was repulsed losing 41 killed.

From 1–30 March 1968 the Division was the target of Operation Patrick.

In the Battle of An Bao from 5–6 May 1968 the Division's 2nd and 22nd Regiments ambushed the US 1st Battalion, 50th Infantry Regiment (Mechanized), losing 117 killed.

In June 1968, the 2nd and 22nd Regiments of the Division moved north into Quảng Ngãi Province to participate the Phase III Offensive (PAVN code name in Vietnamese "Chiến dịch X2") under the command of Colonel Lư Giang, the 12th Regiment still stayed in southern Bình Định Province.^{:chapter 5}

During the Phase III Offensive the Division's 1st Regiment was sent to attack Quảng Ngãi, but were intercepted by US forces and after 4 days of fighting the 1st Regiment withdrew west to its mountain bases leaving 567 dead (U.S body count). The PAVN claim that the Division's 2nd and 22nd Regiments "eliminating 2546 enemy troops".^{:chapter 5} (the 22nd Regiment used to be the 1st Regiment of the 3rd Military Region)

In February 1970, due to lack of logistics, the 22nd Regiment was dispersed to merge with other units of the 5th Military Region.

In early 1972 the Division comprised the 2nd, 12th and 21st Regiments. On 18 April 1972 during the Easter Offensive the Division's 2nd and 21st Regiments attacked the ARVN 40th Regiment, 22nd Division and captured Hoài Ân District and Hoài Nhơn and later engaged the ARVN 41st Regiment, 2nd Division.

During the War of the flags in January/February 1973, two battalions of the Division's 12th Regiment supported the 2nd Division capture of Sa Huỳnh Base, while the rest of the Division attacked government outposts and attempted to prevent the deployment of the ARVN 22nd Division. By the end of the first week of February, the ARVN had reverted all PAVN gains.

During the 1975 Spring Offensive the Division was tasked with cutting Route 19 east of the An Khê Pass to isolate the Central Highlands. After the fall of Ban Me Thuot the Division was ordered on 26 March to move east to the coast to attack the ARVN 22nd Division, however this attack was repulsed by the 42nd Regiment, 22nd Division. The Division then moved units around the 41st and 42nd Regiments by 31 March and the ARVN units disintegrated. On 4 April the Division joined the Coastal Column comprising the Division, 5th Armored Battalion and 2nd Corps which was tasked with moving down Highway 1 to overrun South Vietnamese positions and clear this logistics route. By 14 April the Division was engaging ARVN units defending the approaches to Phan Rang and by 16 April they had captured the city and its air base. On 26 April the Division split from the Coastal Column under the command of Colonel Trần Bá Khuê and attacked towards Vũng Tàu, with the 12th Regiment attacking south along Route 2, while the 141st Regiment supported by tanks attacked Bà Rịa. The initial assault on Bà Rịa was repulsed by ARVN Airborne when the tanks attacked without infantry support, however by 27 April the Division had captured Bà Rịa, and the Airborne retreated across the Cỏ May bridge to the south then broke the bridge. The Division resumed its assault at midnight on 28 April but was held up by a strong defense by the Airborne at the south end of the Cỏ May bridge. The Division's 12th Regiment was then landed by fishing boats behind the Airborne lines and this, together with a renewed attack by the 2nd Regiment, forced the Airborne to retreat into Vũng Tàu. At 01:30 on 30 April the Division began its attack on Vũng Tàu forcing the Airborne into the city center where they eventually succumbed at 11:00.^{:chapter 6}

== After Reunification Day ==
In June 1976, the General Staff decided to send the 3rd Division from the 5th Military Region to the north, to perform the permanent mobile duty of the 3rd Military Region and the Ministry of Defence. Two years later, the division was transferred to the 1st Military Region to perform defensive duties in the southeast of Lạng Sơn province, an important area of the Region^{:chapter 9}

The Division led the defense of Lạng Sơn alongside the 166th Artillery Regiment and the 272nd Anti-Aircraft Regiment under the command of Colonel Nguyễn Duy Thương in the Sino-Vietnamese War.
