= Landing Zone English =

Site information
- Type: Army
- Condition: abandoned

Location
- Coordinates: 14.471°N 109.028°E

Site history
- Built: 1966
- In use: 1966-71
- Battles/wars: Vietnam War; Battle of Bong Son

Garrison information
- Occupants: 1st Cavalry Division; 173rd Airborne Brigade; 22nd Division

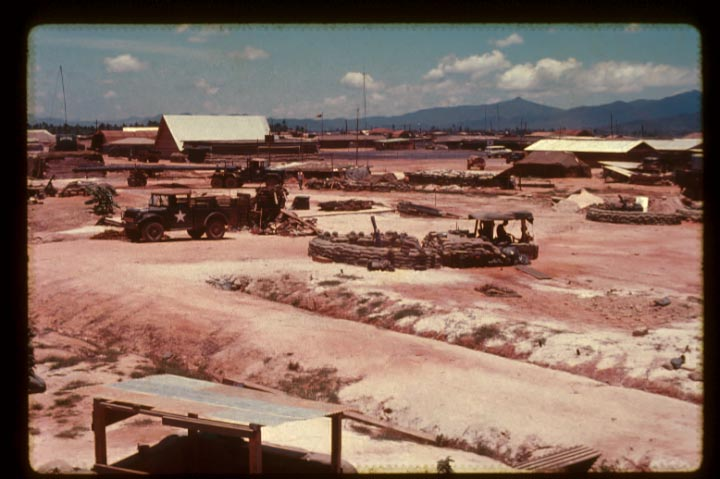
LZ English North, 1968.

English Airfield
- IATA: none; ICAO: none

Summary
- Elevation AMSL: 98 ft (30 m)

Runways
Direction	Length		Surface
Direction	ft	m	Surface
	3,600	1,097	asphalt

Landing Zone English (also known as English Airfield, LZ Dog, LZ English or simply Bong Son) is a former U.S. Army and Army of the Republic of Vietnam (ARVN) base in Bồng Sơn, Bình Định Province, Vietnam.

== History ==
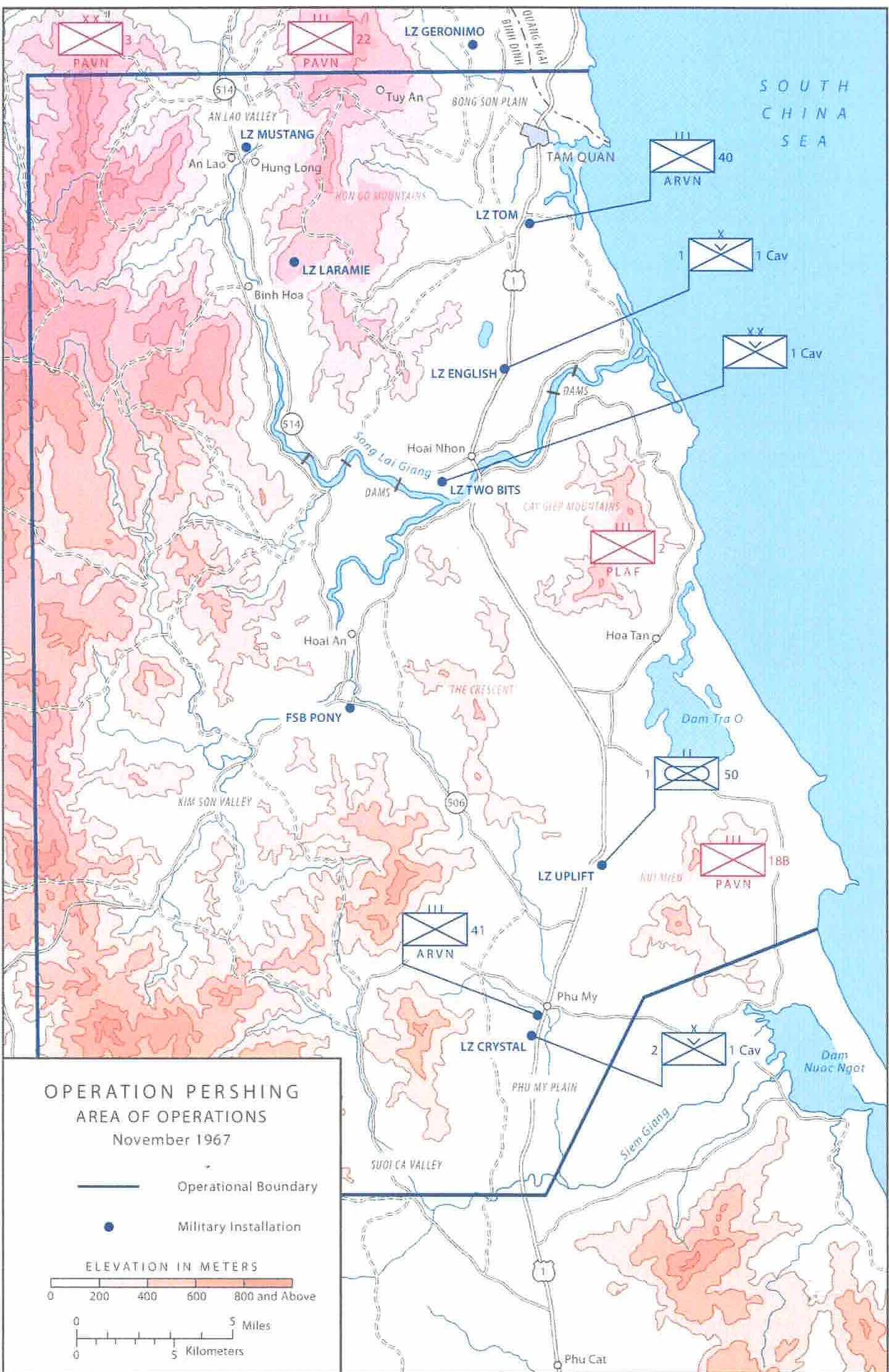
LZ English and neighbouring LZs in Operation Pershing

=== 1966-71 ===
The base was located along Highway 1 approximately 82 km northwest of Qui Nhơn. LZ Dog was originally established by the 1st Cavalry Division in late January 1966 as part of Operation Irving. The base served as headquarters (together with Camp Radcliff) for the 1st Cavalry Division from July 1967 to January 1968. English was the base for the 173rd Airborne Brigade from May 1968 to August 1971.

From August–October 1968 combat engineers from the 18th Engineer Brigade upgraded the existing airstrip into a Lockheed C-130 Hercules capable airfield.

Other units stationed at English included:

- 7th Battalion, 13th Artillery (1967-October 1969)
- 1st Battalion, 30th Artillery (April 1967-February 1968)
- 3rd Battalion, 319th Artillery
- 3rd Brigade, 4th Infantry Division (March–April 1968) comprising:
  - 1st Battalion, 14th Infantry
  - 1st Battalion, 35th Infantry
  - 2nd Battalion, 35th Infantry
  - 1st Battalion, 50th Infantry
- 19th Engineer Battalion (August 1968 to February 1969)
- New Zealand MILPHAP team (October 1967 onwards)

In Operation Pershing, LZ English was nearly destroyed by a fire, probably set by the PAVN 3rd Division's sappers on 6 June 1967.

In November 1970 military police investigated the sale of heroin from a Vietnamese house on the base. On 24 January 1971 NBC reported that soldiers of the 173rd Airborne Brigade stationed at English were buying heroin from the house and the South Vietnamese then proceeded to demolish the house.

=== 1972 ===
During the Easter Offensive, after overrunning much of Bình Định Province, by 1 May the People's Army of Vietnam (PAVN) besieged the ARVN 40th Regiment, 22nd Division at the base. The 40th Regiment, supposed to number 3,000 soldiers had been reduced 40% by desertion and 30% by casualties. On the night of 2 May the 40th Regiment abandoned the base and fled 4 miles (6.4 km) east to the coast where they were picked up Republic of Vietnam Navy landing craft.

== Current use ==
The base is abandoned and turned over to farmland, light industry and housing. The airfield remains visible on satellite images.
