= Operation Dragnet =

Part of the Vietnam War (1967–1968)

- Part of the Vietnam War
Date	26 May 1967 – 27 January 1968
Location	Bình Định Province, South Vietnam
Result	Allies claim operational success

Belligerents
United States; South Vietnam	Viet Cong

Commanders and leaders
MG John J. Tolson	

Units involved
(United States) 1st Cavalry Division (South Vietnam) 222nd National Police Field Force Battalion; 816th National Police Field Force Battalion	

Casualties and losses
(United States) 12 killed	US/ARVN body count: 223 killed 944 suspects detained

Operation Dragnet was a security operation conducted by the 1st Cavalry Division in Bình Định Province, lasting from 26 May 1967 to 27 January 1968.

== Background ==
In May 1967, I Field Force expanded the mission of the 1st Cavalry Division to include the destruction of the Viet Cong (VC) infrastructure in Bình Định Province. The South Vietnamese 816th National Police Field Force Battalion was assigned to assist the 1st Cavalry and was stationed at the 1st Cavalry's headquarters at Landing Zone Two Bits.

== Operation ==
The operation commenced on 26 May, comprising numerous small security sweeps by combined 1st Cavalry/Police units. The 1st Cavalry troops would secure an area and the National Police would interrogate, identify and arrest suspected VC. The National Police progressively built up detailed intelligence of suspected VC and repeated sweeps and interrogations led to the arrest of more and more suspected VC. The operation used many of the tactics of what would later become known as the Phoenix Program.

In September 1967 the 222nd National Police Field Force Battalion replaced the 816th Battalion.

By the conclusion of the operation the 1st Cavalry/National Police had conducted over 900 security sweeps and conducted over 323,261 interrogations leading to the capture of 944 suspected VC.

== Aftermath ==
Operation Dragnet officially concluded on 27 January 1968, U.S. losses were 12 killed with VC losses claimed as 223 killed.
