= Attorney General Norton =

Attorney General Norton may refer to:

- Fletcher Norton, 1st Baron Grantley (1716–1789), Attorney General for England and Wales
- Gale Norton (born 1954), Attorney General of Colorado

== See also ==
- General Norton (disambiguation)
