= Sa Huỳnh Base =

Military base

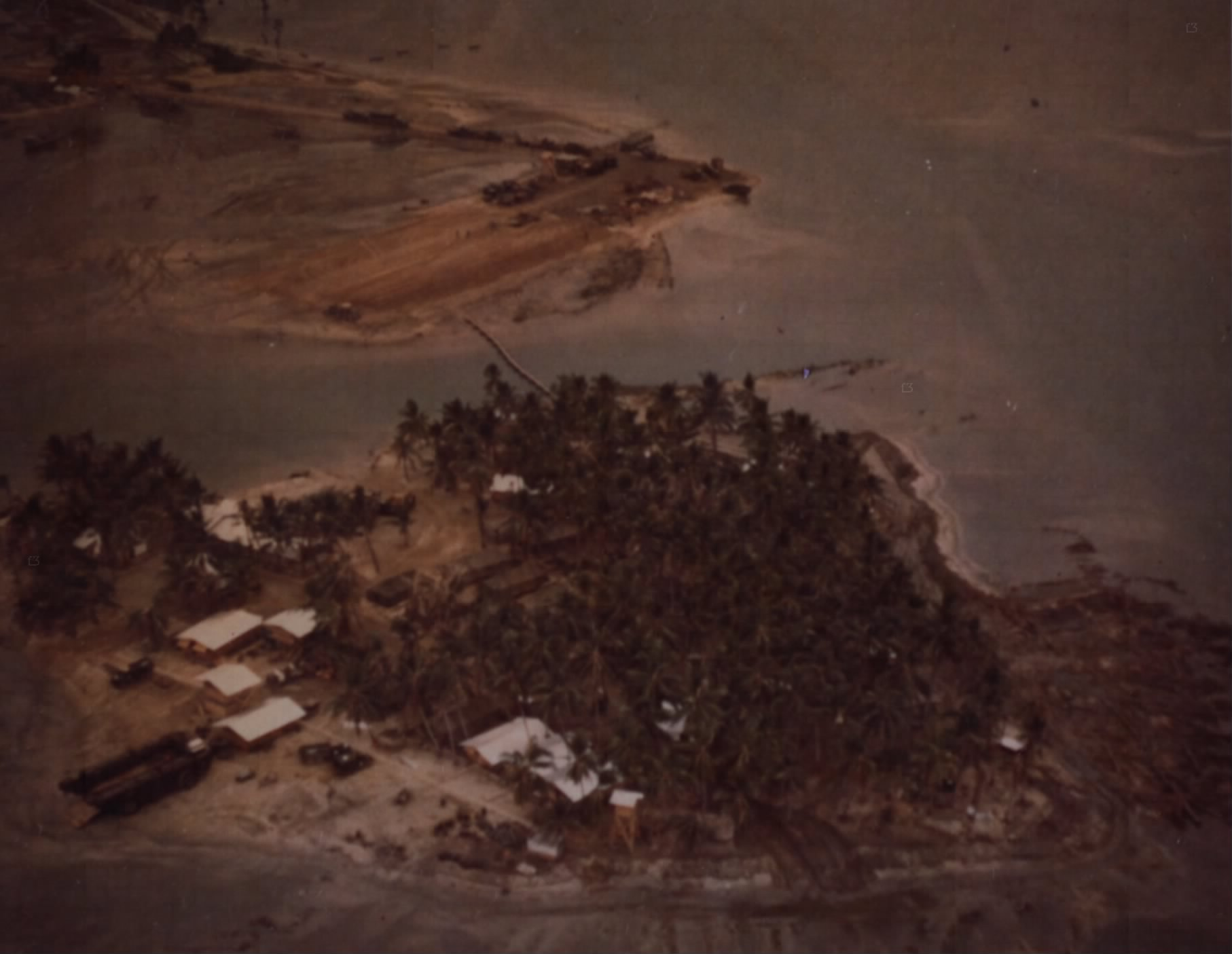
- Sa Huỳnh Base under construction, 29 November 1967

Site information
- Type: Navy/Army

Location
- Coordinates: 14.667°N 109.072°E

Site history
- Built: 1967
- In use: 1967–1975
- Battles/wars: Vietnam War

Sa Huỳnh Base (also known as Sa Huỳnh Naval Support Activity or simply Sa Huỳnh) is a former U.S. Navy, U.S. Army and Army of the Republic of Vietnam (ARVN) base in southern Quảng Ngãi Province in south-central Vietnam.

== History ==
The base was located east of Highway 1 at the mouth of an inlet, some 18 km southeast of Đức Phổ Base Camp and 100 km south of Danang. From 16–26 February 1967 the Marines Special Landing Force comprising 1st Battalion 4th Marines and HMM-363 conducted Operation Deckhouse VI an amphibious assault on Sa Huỳnh to clear Vietcong infiltration routes and secure an area to serve as a logistics support base for allied units operating in the area.

The U.S. Navy built the Sa Huỳnh Naval Support Activity in mid-1967 to support the arrival of the Army's Task Force Oregon in the area.

On 15 February 1970 Sa Huỳnh Naval Support Activity was disbanded and its facilities were transferred to the U.S. Army Support Command.

On 27 January 1973 the day before the ceasefire was to come into effect the People's Army of Vietnam (PAVN) 141st Regiment captured Sa Huỳnh. The ARVN 2nd Division launched a series of counterattacks, forcing the PAVN out of Sa Huỳnh by 16 February 1973.
