= John Norton (general) =

United States Army general (1918–2004)

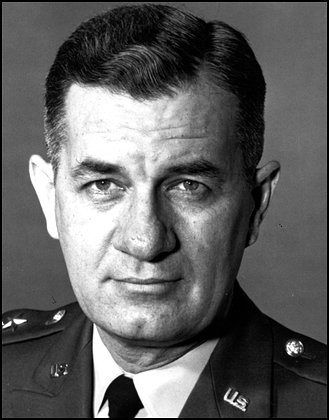
- Born: 14 April 1918; Fort Monroe, Virginia
- Died: 6 December 2004 (aged 86); Basye, Virginia
- Burial place: West Point Cemetery
- Spouse(s): Cheyney MacNabb Norton; Leslie Cameron Smith
- Military career
- Allegiance: United States of America
- Branch: United States Army
- Service years: 1936–1937; 1941–1975
- Rank: Lieutenant General
- Nickname: Jack
- Service number: O-23858
- Commands: U.S. Army Combat Developments Command; U.S. Army Aviation Systems Command; 1st Air Cavalry Division; U.S. Army Support Command Vietnam
- Conflicts: World War II; Invasion of Normandy; Battle of the Bulge; Vietnam War
- Awards: Distinguished Service Medal (4); Silver Star; Legion of Merit (4); Bronze Star Medal (3) (Note: Sources conflict over whether Norton received two or three Bronze Stars. The Veterans History Project lists Norton as having received three while Norton's obituary in The Washington Post states that he received only two. For the purposes of this article, The Veterans History Project will be assumed to be correct as being a task force of the Library of Congress, a government organization.); Air Medal

Lieutenant General John Norton (14 April 1918 – 6 December 2004) was a general in the United States Army. His decorations include the Distinguished Service Medal (4 times) and the Silver Star. He was key in founding the United States Army Aviation Branch and helped pioneer the use of helicopters in combat, and is a member of the Army Aviation Hall of Fame and the Army Field Experimentation Hall of Fame.

== Early life and career ==
Norton was born on 14 April 1918 in Fort Monroe, Virginia to Colonel Agustus Norton and Nancy Reed Norton. His father was a front-line artillery officer during World War I, and was an influence on Norton's desire to join the military and become an army officer. Norton spent his early life in Norfolk, Virginia, attending Matthew Fontaine Maury High School. In 1935, Norton enlisted in the Citizens' Military Training Camp in Fort George G. Meade. He enlisted in the army on 1 July 1936 and won an appointment to the United States Military Academy in 1937. Norton was president of his class during his second-class year and First Captain during his first-class year. Norton graduated in 1941 and commissioned in the infantry.

== World War II ==
Norton's first assignment out of West Point was to 12th Infantry Regiment, 4th Infantry Division as a company commander. He then returned to Infantry School in the fall of 1942 to attend the Battalion Commander and Staff Officers Course and the Parachute Course. Following his completion of the course, he reported to the 82nd Airborne Division in North Africa. He was soon promoted to executive officer of the 2d Battalion, 505th Parachute Infantry Regiment. Two months later, he was again promoted, to S-3 (operations officer) of the Regiment. He made his first of four combat jumps as an executive officer, participating in the Invasion of Sicily. After returning to North Africa, he made a second combat jump into Salerno, Italy, blocking German forces who were trying to attack US amphibious forces. His third jump was in support of the Invasion of Normandy on D-Day, 6 June 1944 when he led his men in the dark over St. Mere-Eglise, France. In July of that year, he assumed command of the 3d Battalion; he was promoted the next month to G3 of the 82d Airborne Division. Norton made his fourth combat jump in September, in the Netherlands to take control of the bridges from the Dutch border to Arnhem as part of Operation Market Garden.

== Later career ==
After World War II, Norton returned to Fort Bragg with the 82d Airborne Division. He served successively as Division G-3, a battalion commander in the 325th Infantry Regiment, then Regimental Commander of the 505th Infantry Regiment and a second regimental command tour, returning to the 325th Infantry Regiment. He transferred to Washington, D.C. in 1948 to serve as a staff officer with the Strategic Plans Group of the General Staff, then with the Deputy Chief for Plans, Office of the Chief of Staff. From June 1950 to February 1953, Norton served as Military Assistant and Executive Officer to the Secretary of the Army, Frank Pace, Jr. He then attended the Armed Forces Staff College until he left to become chief of the American Section in September; he held this command until August 1955.

Norton was originally ordered to return to the Armed Forces Staff College as an instructor; instead, General James Gavin made Norton chief of the Airborne and Electronics division of the Army Aviation Branch. Norton served in this capacity until September 1956, when he became a student at the Army Aviation Center and School to increase his effectiveness. While there, Norton became a Senior Army Aviator. Norton returned to his post after graduating in June 1957; he held this command until August 1958. In October 1957, Norton served as the escort to Prince Philip, Duke of Edinburgh, in his visit to America with Elizabeth II.

After attending the National War College in 1959, Norton Commanded the 2d Battle Group of the 1st Cavalry Division at the Korean Demilitarized Zone from August 1959, to September 1960. From then until May 1962, Norton served as the Continental Army Aviation Officer in the Continental Army Command. He was responsible for all aviation training, support, and doctrinal matters, and served on the Hoelscher Committee and the Howze Board. Under Norton's recommendation, the first Air Assault Division was created at Fort Benning in early 1963. From May 1963 to March 1965, Norton served as the Assistant Commandant of the Infantry School at Fort Benning. While there, he redesigned the school to better train the students to fight in the Vietnam War.

Norton was called to Vietnam himself, becoming commander of the United States Army Support Command in April 1965. After serving as the Deputy Commanding General of the United States Army Vietnam, Norton commanded the 1st Air Cavalry Division from May 1966 to April 1967. After undergoing a colectomy in June 1967, Norton became the Commanding General of the United States Army Aviation Systems Command, a position he held until September 1969. From October 1969 to October 1970, Norton was the Deputy Director of Modern Army Selected Systems Test Evaluation and Review project ("Project MASSTER") in Fort Hood, Texas, tasked with developing sensors to use in weapons systems in Vietnam. After initially being tasked with the position of Force Development in the Pentagon, Norton was instead made Commanding General of the Army's Combat Developments Command. Occupying the position until June 1973, Norton assisted in the continued reorganization of the Army, unsuccessfully attempting to preserve the Combat Development Command, which was later reestablished at Fort Leavenworth, Kansas. While serving in this position, Norton oversaw the early development of the Sikorsky UH-60 Black Hawk helicopter and M1 Abrams tank. In his final assignment, Norton served as Chief of Staff of NATO Allied Forces Southern Europe from June 1973 to August 1975.

== Legacy and honors ==
Norton had a major role in developing Army aviation. In 1977, Norton was inducted into the Army Aviation Hall of Fame, and has also been inducted into the Army Field Experimentation Hall of Fame. Norton received the Doughboy Award on 22 September 2004. Norton was nominated for the West Point Distinguished Graduate Award.

== Awards and decorations ==
U.S. decorations and awards
Distinguished Service Medal w/ 3 oak leaf clusters
Silver Star
Legion of Merit w/ 3 OLCs
Bronze Star Medal w/ "V" Device and 2 OLCs
Air Medal w/ "V" Device and 9 OLCs
Army Commendation Medal w/ OLC
United States service medals
American Defense Service Medal
American Campaign Medal
European-African-Middle Eastern Campaign Medal w/ 6 battle stars and arrowhead
Army of Occupation of Germany Medal
World War II Victory Medal
Vietnam Service Medal w/ 3 battle stars
National Defense Service Medal w/ OLC
Armed Forces Expeditionary Medal w/ 2 battle stars
Foreign decorations and awards
Dutch Lanyard^{†}
Belgian fourragère^{†}
French Fourragère^{†}
Vietnamese Distinguished Service Order, first class
Belgian Order of the Crown w/palm,^{†} officer degree
Korean Order of Military Merit, third class
National Order of Vietnam, fifth class
Vietnamese Gallantry Cross w/ palm
French Croix de Guerre w/ palm device
Belgian Croix de guerre w/ palm device^{†}
Vietnamese Armed Forces Honor Medal, first class
Vietnam Campaign Medal w/ 1960 device

^{†} Not shown.

Other accoutrements
Army Staff Identification Badge
Master Parachutist Badge w/ 4 bronze stars^{†}
Senior Army Aviator Badge
Combat Infantryman Badge
Pathfinder Badge

== Effective dates of promotion ==
United States Military Academy Cadet – Class of 1941

Rank	Date (Temporary)	Date (Permanent)
Second Lieutenant	—N/a	11 June 1941
First Lieutenant	1 February 1942	11 June 1942
Captain	23 October 1942	1 July 1948
Major	20 November 1943	2 July 1953
Lieutenant Colonel	26 October 1944	11 June 1961
Colonel	31 July 1953	11 June 1966
Brigadier General	1 April 1963	6 December 1967
Major General	1 April 1966	12 December 1968
Lieutenant General	22 October 1970	—N/a

== Personal life ==
During his first-class year at West Point, he was roommates and friends with George Scratchley Brown, future Chief of Staff of the Air Force and Chairman of the Joint Chiefs of Staff. Norton dated his future second wife Leslie Smith during his final two years at West Point. Although the two considered marriage while dating, they had different military career aspirations causing them to separate after graduation; in that time, Smith married a doctor. After Norton went on a blind date with his West Point classmate and friend Cheyney McNabb, the two married in April 1946. Cheyney gave birth to a son in July 1947; to a daughter in April 1951; and to another daughter in June 1953. Cheyney died after 46 years of marriage to Norton. After hearing through a mutual friend that Smith had been widowed 36 years prior, Norton reconnected with her, proposed, and married her in September 1992. Leslie died of Alzheimer's disease in May 2002.

In his later years, Norton became involved in his community, becoming a board member of the Shenandoah Valley Boy Scout Council and County Mental Health Group. He became a Senior Warden at St. Andrew's Episcopal Church in Mount Jackson, Virginia, and served on the board of trustees for the Reserve Officers' Training Corps at James Madison University and the Massanutten Military Academy. He died of cancer in his Basye, Virginia home on 6 December 2004.
