= Bồng Sơn =

Bồng Sơn Phường Bồng Sơn
- Ward
- Location of Bồng Sơn in Vietnam
- Coordinates: 14°26′N 109°01′E
- Country: Vietnam
- Province: Gia Lai
- Time zone: UTC+07:00 (Indochina Time)
- Climate: Am

Bồng Sơn is a ward (phường) of Gia Lai Province, Vietnam.

== Geography and infrastructure ==
Bong Son is located in Bình Định's northern lowlands near Lai Giang River. It lies around 18 km (road distance) west of the South China Sea coast.

Bong Son is located along National Route 1, Vietnam's most important road. Intersections with Road 630 and Road 629 leading up to Hoài Ân District and An Lão District are within a few kilometres of the town.

The town has two post offices, one central plaza, and a stadium for cultural and sports events. Over 60% of households have been provided with clean running water. The town maintains 47 km of roads and streets, averaging between 8 and 12 meters in width.

== History ==
According to historian Đào Duy Anh, Bồng Sơn was set up under king Lê Thánh Tông in 1471. It later became one of three administrative centres in what is now Bình Định Province.

Bồng Sơn was the site of an uprising against French colonialism in 1945, involving around 8000 people and led by Trịnh Hồng Kỳ.

As much of Bình Định Province, it was the site of severe fighting during the Vietnam War and a major battle in 1966.

== Economy ==
Bồng Sơn has a small industrial park (Cụm công nghiệp Bồng Sơn) with industries such as wood processing.
