= Class of 9/11 =

2005 US military academy graduating class

The Class of 9/11 is now used mainly to refer to the 2005 graduating classes of the United States Naval Academy and the United States Military Academy at West Point, which contained 911 students. According to the Associated Press report the graduating cadets were told they were "a special group forged by historic events".

On September 12, 2006, the first member of the class was killed. 2nd Lt. Emily Perez, a Medical Service Corps officer with the 204th Support Battalion, 2nd Brigade, 4th Infantry Division, was leading a platoon when a roadside bomb exploded, killing her. Perez, who had been the highest-ranking black and Hispanic woman in the Academy's history, was the first female West Point graduate to die in Iraq.
