= Emily Perez =

United States Army officer (1983–2006)

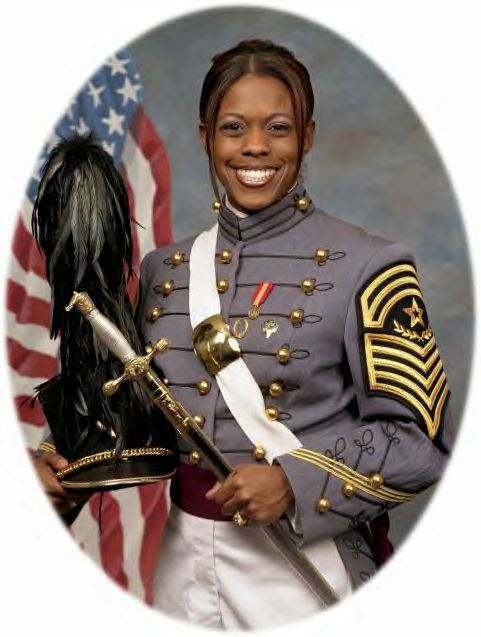
- Pictured as a USMA cadet in 2005
- Born: Emily Jazmin Tatum Perez; 19 February 1983; Heidelberg, West Germany
- Died: 12 September 2006 (aged 23); KIA in Al Kifl, Iraq
- Cause of death: Improvised explosive device
- Burial place: West Point Cemetery
- Education: United States Military Academy
- Military career
- Allegiance: United States of America
- Branch: United States Army
- Service years: 2001–2006 (USMA Cadet and active duty officer)
- Rank: Second Lieutenant
- Nickname: Taz
- Units: 204th Support Battalion, 2nd Brigade, 4th Infantry Division
- Conflicts: Iraq War
- Awards: Bronze Star; Purple Heart; National Defense Service Medal; Global War on Terrorism Service Medal

Emily Jazmin Tatum Perez (19 February 1983 – 12 September 2006) was an American military officer. After graduating from the United States Military Academy at West Point, Second Lieutenant Perez was serving in the Iraq War when she was killed in action by an improvised explosive device. She became the first black female officer in U.S. military history to die in combat.

== Early life and education ==
Perez was born in Heidelberg, West Germany, in a U.S. military family. Her mother was African-American and her father was Afro-Latino Puerto-Rican. As a child, she became fully fluent in German. When she was in tenth grade, her parents relocated to Maryland. She graduated from Oxon Hill High School, where she ranked among the top 5% of students in her class.

=== United States Military Academy ===
In July 2001, Perez entered the United States Military Academy, where she was a member of the class of 9/11. At West Point, she was an exemplary student and talented track athlete. Perez set school records as a sprinter, led the school's gospel choir and started a dance squad. At West Point, she was given the nickname "Taz" by her classmates for her energy and short stature, at only 5 ft 3 in (1.60 m). Upon graduation in 2005, Perez held the second highest rank in her senior class. As brigade command sergeant major, she became the highest-ranking minority woman cadet in West Point history.

== Iraq deployment ==
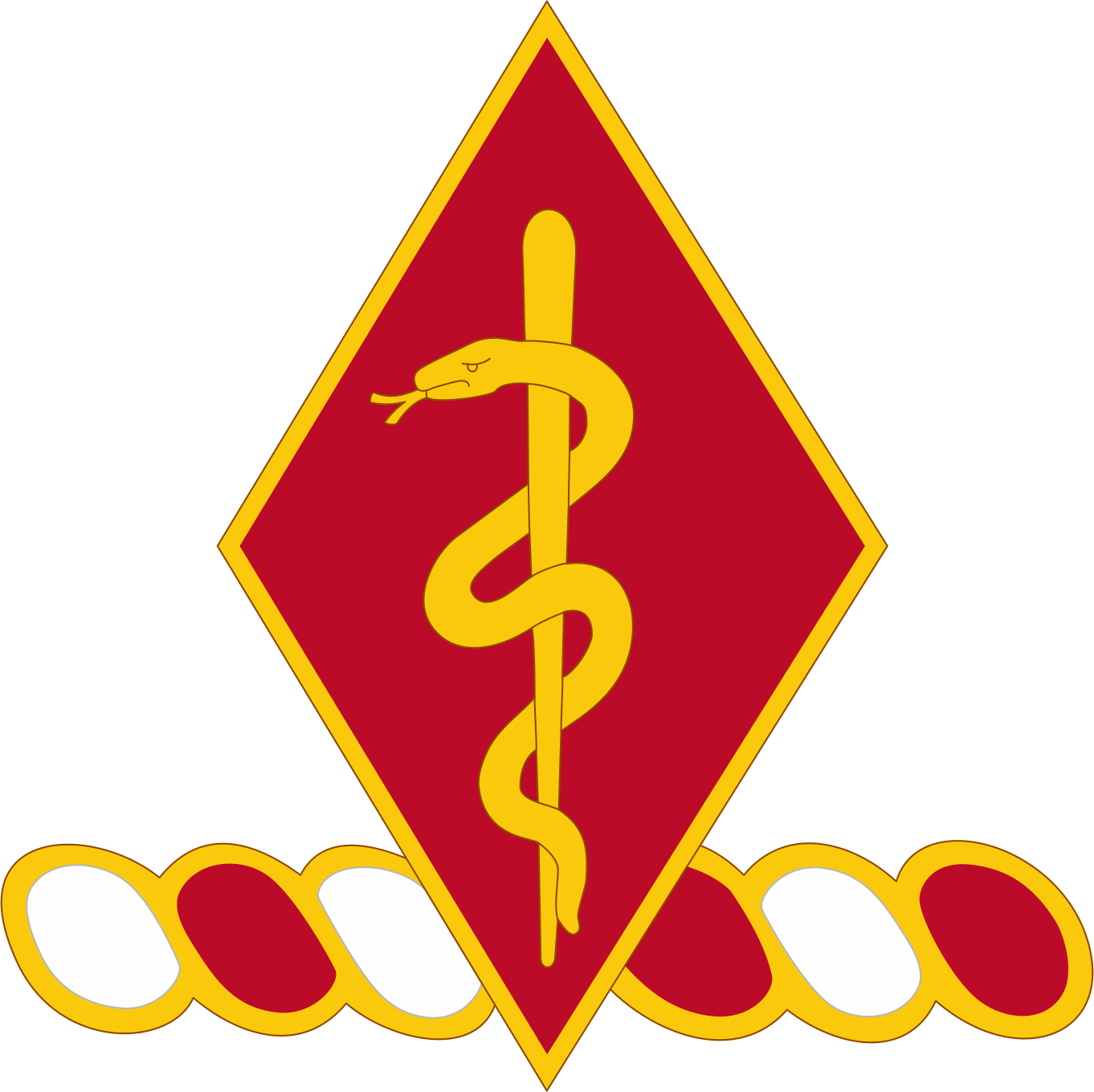
Insignia of the 204th Support Battalion, Perez's unit

Following graduation in 2005, Perez was commissioned a Second Lieutenant in the 204th Support Battalion, 2nd Brigade, 4th Infantry Division of the United States Army based at Fort Hood, Texas.

In December 2005, Perez was deployed to Iraq as a Medical Service Corps officer. Prior to deployment, she donated bone marrow to a stranger. Medical Service Corps officers typically run medical facilities in the field. In Iraq, she distinguished herself as a leader, supporting where she was needed. Perez volunteered to lead convoys of Humvees between battle stations, often driving in the front of the convoy.

=== Death ===
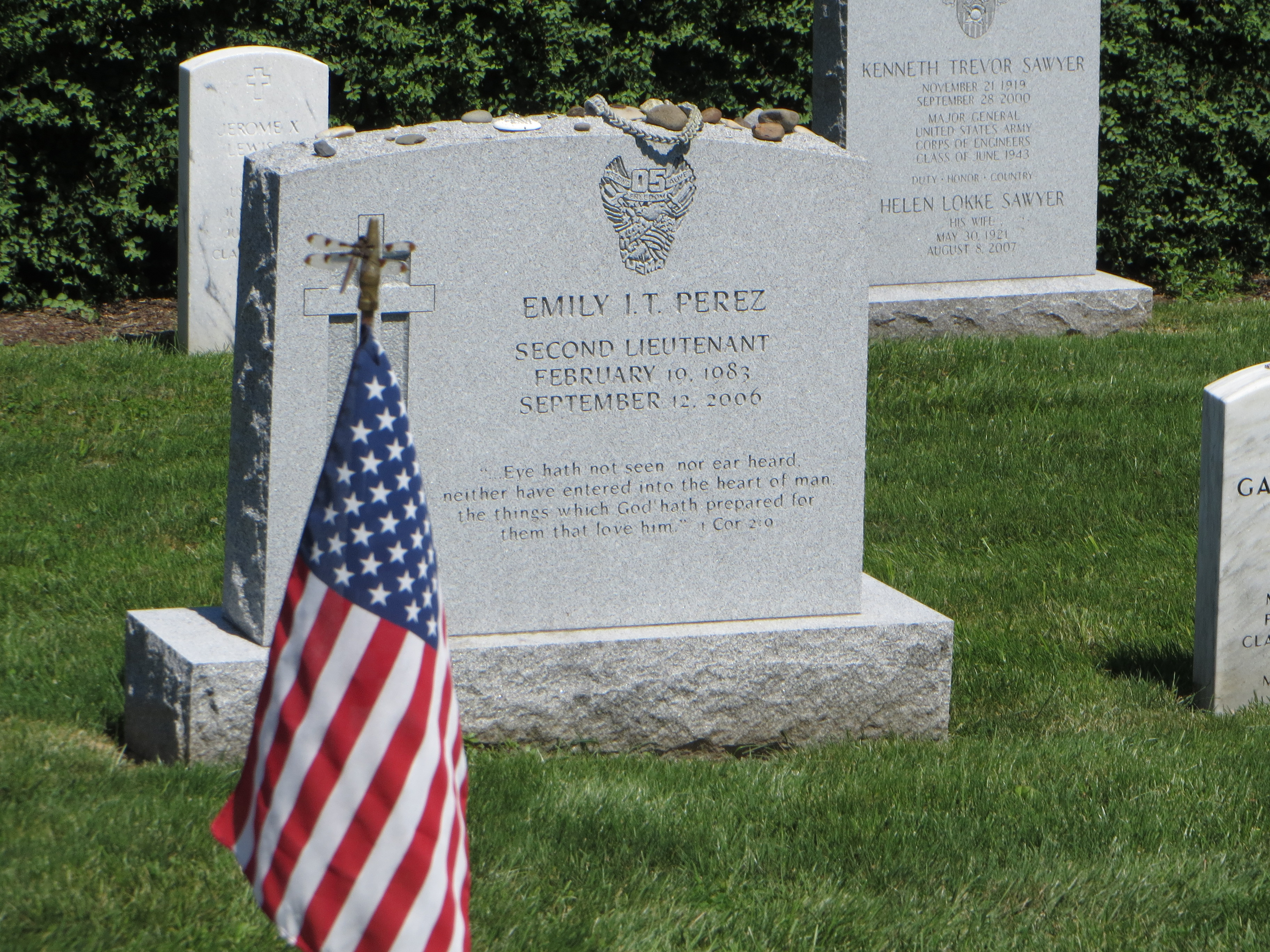
Grave of Emily Perez, West Point Cemetery (2013)

On September 12, 2006, Perez volunteered to lead a platoon when she was killed after a makeshift bomb exploded near her Humvee near Najaf. Perez was killed instantly.

Emily Perez was the first black female officer to be killed in action in United States military history and the first female graduate of West Point to die in Iraq. She became the 64th female member of the U.S. military to be killed in combat operations in Iraq and Afghanistan, and the 40th West Point graduate killed since the September 11, 2001 attacks.

Perez was buried with full military honors at the West Point Cemetery.

== Honors and legacy ==
Bronze Star Medal
Purple Heart
Army Commendation Medal
National Defense Service Medal
Iraq Campaign Medal
Global War on Terrorism Service Medal
Army Service Ribbon
Army Overseas Service Ribbon
Combat Action Badge

Lieutenant Perez's military awards include the Bronze Star; Purple Heart; Army Commendation Medal; National Defense Service Medal; Iraq Campaign Medal; Global War on Terrorism Service Medal; Army Service Ribbon; Overseas Service Ribbon; and the Combat Action Badge. She posthumously received the NCAA Award of Valor in 2008.

After her death, the 4th Infantry Division dedicated the Emily Perez Treatment Facility at Forward Operating Base Kalsu in her honor, and named a street, Emily’s Way, after her. In 2011, the American Legion Mulligan-Eden Post 1573 dedicated River Road as 2nd Lt. Emily J.T. Perez Memorial Way. In March 2026, Perez was inducted into the Maryland Women's Hall of Fame.

=== Exhibitions ===
Emily Perez's class ring, Bible and saber from West Point are now exhibited in the National Museum of African American History and Culture. Her identification tags, desert cap, and desert camouflage coat are exhibited in the National Museum of the United States Army.

== See also ==
- Megan McClung, first female United States Marine Corps officer killed in combat during the Iraq War, and the first female graduate of the U.S. Naval Academy to be killed in action.
