= Operation Masher =

1966 battle of the Vietnam War

- Part of the Vietnam War
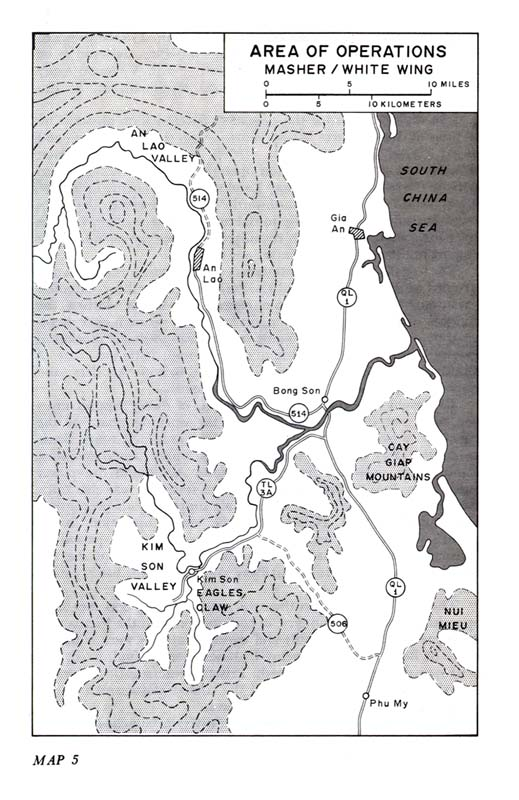
Date	January 24 – March 6, 1966 (1 month, 1 week and 3 days)
Location	Bồng Sơn Plain, Kim Sơn Valley, An Lão Valley, Bình Định Province, South Vietnam
Result	Inconclusive

Belligerents
United States; South Vietnam; South Korea	North Vietnam; Viet Cong

Commanders and leaders
(United States) Harry Kinnard (United States) Hal Moore (United States) Elvy B. Roberts (United States) William R. Lynch	(North Vietnam) Giáp Văn Cương

Units involved
(United States) 1st Cavalry Division (South Vietnam) 22nd Infantry Division (Third Republic of Korea) Capital Division	(North Vietnam) 3rd Division

Strength
(United States) 5,700 (South Vietnam) ~10,000 (Third Republic of Korea) unknown	(North Vietnam) ~6,000 (US estimate)

Casualties and losses
(United States) 288 killed 990 wounded (Third Republic of Korea) 10 killed 40 wounded (South Vietnam) 119 killed ~400 wounded PAVN claim: 2,000+ killed, wounded or captured^{:chapter 4}	U.S. claim: 2,150 killed 1,746 estimated killed 300–600 captured 500 defected 254 weapons recovered
- Unknown number of civilian casualties, reportedly 10,000+

Operation Masher, also known as Operation White Wing, (24 January—6 March 1966) was the largest search and destroy mission that had been carried out in the Vietnam War up until that time. It was a combined mission of the United States Army, Army of the Republic of Vietnam (ARVN), and Republic of Korea Army (ROK) in Bình Định Province on the central coast of South Vietnam. The People's Army of Vietnam (PAVN) 3rd Division, made up of two regiments of North Vietnamese regulars and one regiment of main force Viet Cong (VC) guerrillas, controlled much of the land and many of the people of Bình Định Province, which had a total population of about 800,000. A CIA report in 1965 said that Binh Dinh was "just about lost" to the communists.

The name "Operation Masher" was changed to "Operation White Wing", because President Lyndon Johnson wanted the name changed to one that sounded more benign. Adjacent to the operational area of Masher/White Wing in Quang Ngai province the U.S. and South Vietnamese Marine Corps carried out a complementary mission called Operation Double Eagle.

The 1st Cavalry Division (Airmobile) was the principal U.S. ground force involved in Operation Masher and that operation was marked as a success by its commanders. Claims are made that the PAVN 3rd Division had been dealt a hard blow, but intelligence reports indicated that a week after the withdrawal of the 1st Cavalry PAVN soldiers were returning to take control of the area where Operation Masher had taken place. Most of the PAVN/VC had slipped away prior to or during the operation, and discrepancy between weapons recovered and body count led to criticisms of the operation.

Allegations that there were a reported six civilian casualties for every reported PAVN/VC casualty during the Fulbright Hearings prompted growing criticism of US conduct of the war and contributed to greater public dissension at home. During Operation Masher, the ROK Capital Division were alleged to have committed the Bình An/Tây Vinh massacre between 12 February and 17 March 1966, in which over 1,000 civilians were allegedly killed. The operation would create almost 125,000 homeless people in this province, and the PAVN/VC forces would reappear just months after the US had conducted the operation.

== Background ==
Bình Định Province was a traditional communist and VC stronghold. Binh Dinh consisted of a narrow, heavily cultivated coastal plain with river valleys separated by ridges and low mountains reaching into the interior. The main effort of the campaign in Binh Dinh would come on the Bồng Sơn Plain and in the mountains and valleys that bordered it. The plain, a narrow strip of land starting just north of the town of Bồng Sơn, ran northward along the coast into I Corps. Rarely more than 25 km wide, it consisted of a series of small deltas, which often backed into gently rolling terraces some 30-90m in height, and, at irregular intervals, of a number of mountainous spurs from the highlands. These spurs created narrow river valleys with steep ridges that frequently provided hideouts for PAVN/VC units or housed PAVN/VC command, control and logistical centers. The plain itself was bisected by the east-west Lai Giang River, which was in turn fed by two others, the An Lao, flowing from the northwest and the Kim Son, flowing from the southwest. These two rivers formed isolated but fertile valleys west of the coastal plain. The climate in the region was governed by the northeast monsoon. The heaviest rains had usually ended by December, but a light steady drizzle, which the French had called crachin weather and occasional torrential downpours could be expected to occur through March. These weather systems would at times limit the availability of air support.

The vital artery of Highway 1 ran north and south ran through Binh Dinh. The area of Operation Masher was about 30 miles (48 km) north to south and reached a maximum of 30 miles (48 km) inland from the South China Sea. The U.S. Marine's Operation Double Eagle extended northward from Masher and the ROK's Operation Flying Tiger extended southward. South Vietnamese forces participated in all three operations.

The First Cavalry Division (Airmobile) was selected by U.S. Commander William Westmoreland to carry out the operation. The 1st Cavalry had borne the brunt of the combat during the Siege of Plei Me and the Battle of Ia Drang in October and November 1965, and some battalions of the 1st Cavalry had sustained heavy casualties. More than 5,000 soldiers in the division were recent arrivals in Vietnam with little combat experience. The South Vietnamese 22nd Division stationed in Binh Dinh had also suffered heavy casualties in recent fighting and was on the defensive.

The opposition to the American and South Vietnamese units participating in Operation Masher/White Wing was the PAVN 3rd Division consisting of approximately 6,000 soldiers in two regiments of PAVN regulars who had a recently infiltrated into South Vietnam via the Ho Chi Minh Trail and one regiment of VC guerrillas who had been fighting the South Vietnamese government since 1962. The majority of the population of Binh Dinh was believed to be supportive of the VC.

The plan of Operation Masher was for the U.S., South Vietnamese and ROK soldiers to sweep north and for the U.S. and South Vietnamese marines to sweep south catching and killing the PAVN/VC forces between the allied forces. Orders for the U.S. forces in Operation Masher were to "locate and destroy VC/NVA units; enhance the security of GVN [Government of South Vietnam] installations in [provincial capital] Bồng Sơn, and to lay the groundwork for restoration of GVN control of the population and rich coastal plain area." The primary metric for judging the success of the operation would be the body count of PAVN/VC soldiers killed.

== Preparations ==
The 1st Cavalry Division broke the campaign into two parts. During the first, primarily a preparation and deception operation, a brigade-size task force would establish a temporary command and forward supply base at Phu Cat on Highway 1 south of the area of operations, secure the highway somewhat northward, and start patrolling around Phu Cat to convey the impression that the true target area was well away from the plain. During the second, division elements would move to Bồng Sơn itself and launch a series of airmobile hammer-and-anvil operations around the plain and the adjacent valleys to flush the PAVN/VC toward strong blocking positions. General Harry Kinnard assigned the mission to Colonel Hal Moore's 3rd Brigade, but if need be, he was ready to add a second brigade to the operation to intensify the pressure and pursuit.

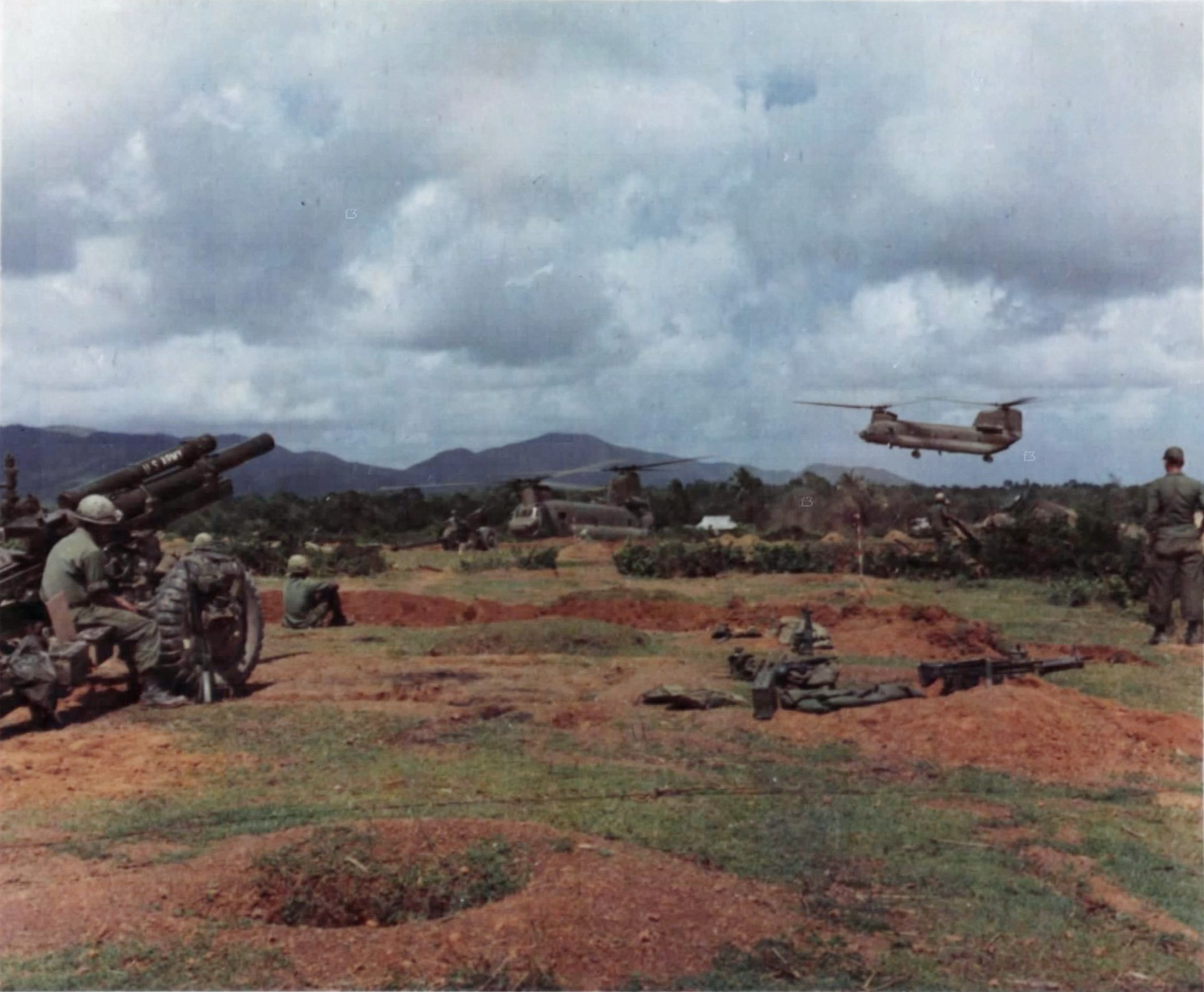
1st Cavalry Division deploys, 25 January

On the morning of 25 January the men of the 3rd Brigade at Camp Radcliff began their move to staging areas in eastern Binh Dinh. Two battalions, Lieutenant colonel Raymond L. Kampe's 1st Battalion, 7th Cavalry Regiment and Lt. Col. Rutland D. Beard's 1st Battalion, 12th Cavalry Regiment went by road and air to Phu Cat, joined South Koreans in securing the airfield and support base, and carried out wide-ranging search and destroy actions nearby that met only light resistance. Meanwhile, Lt. Col. Robert McDade's 2nd Battalion, 7th Cavalry, with about 80 percent of its authorized strength and thus still not fully reconstituted after the fight at LZ Albany, boarded a dozen C-123s at the airstrip for the short ride into Bồng Sơn. One of the C-123s crashed into mountains near An Khe, killing all four crewmen and 42 passengers on board. The rest of the battalion deployed without incident and then helicoptered north to Landing Zone Dog, where engineers started building an airstrip and digging in artillery.

On paper, the hammer-and-anvil attack plan was not complicated. After 3rd Brigade elements secured mountain positions west of the Bồng Sơn and set up Firebases Brass and Steel, covering the northern and southern parts of the search area, 2/7th Cavalry would push north from LZ Dog and 2/12th Cavalry, also staging from LZ Dog, would work its way south from the opposite end of the target zone. Meanwhile, with the South Vietnamese Airborne Brigade acting as an eastern blocking force along Highway 1, 1/7th Cavalry would air-assault onto the high ground to the west and push east towards 2/7th Cavalry and 2/12th Cavalry. If PAVN/VC units were in the area, the 3rd Brigade would bring them to battle or destroy them as they fled.

== The operation ==
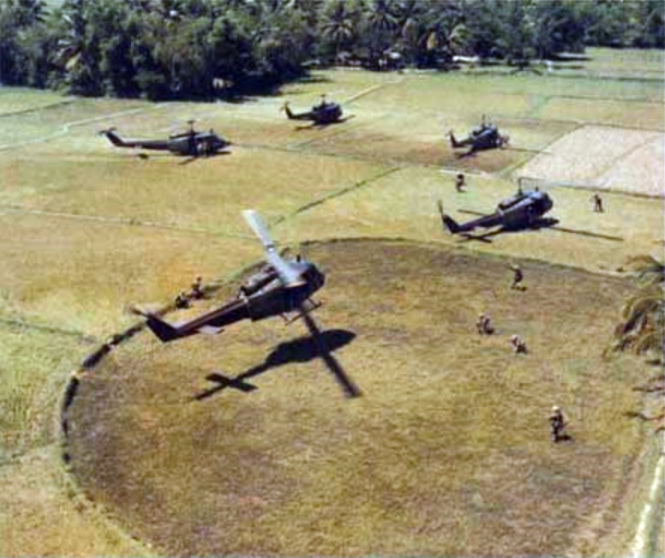
A landing zone for American troops north of Bong Son

=== Phase One: Bồng Sơn ===
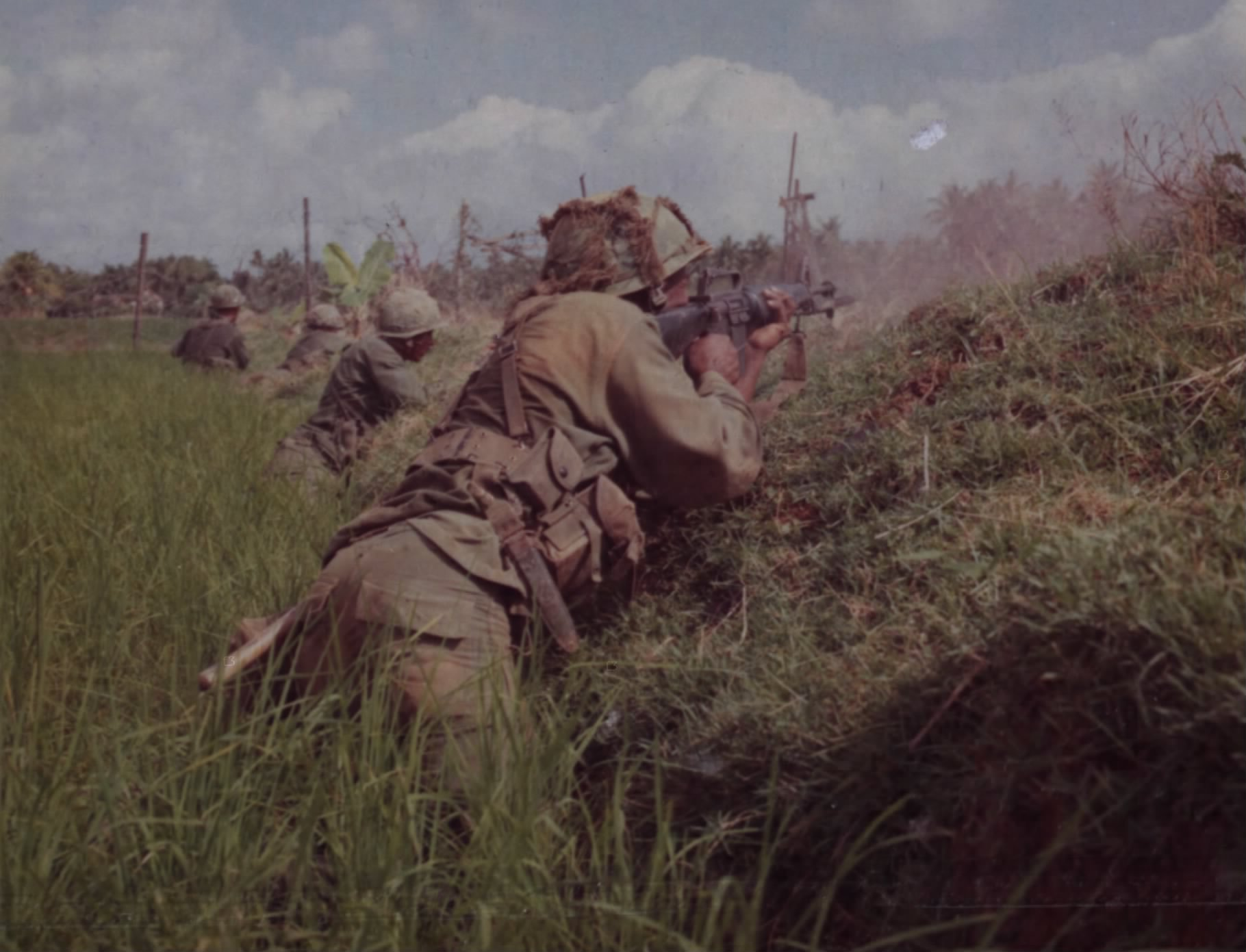
Troops of Company "C", 2nd Battalion, 7th Cavalry Regiment engage a VC bunker

Operation Masher began officially on the morning of 28 January 1966. Low clouds, wind and heavy rain prevented the movement of artillery to Firebase Brass. Lacking supporting fire, Moore cancelled the 2/12th Cavalry's mission. In the meantime, PAVN/VC fire downed a CH-47 helicopter at Landing Zone Papa north of Bồng Sơn and Kampe responded by sending a 1/7th Cavalry company to secure the crash site. When it too came under fire, he set aside his original mission, the attack east from the mountains and moved his two other companies to LZ Papa. By the time they arrived, however, the PAVN/VC had withdrawn. Kampe's units spent the night at the landing zone. McDade went ahead with the mission, directing his men to begin scouring the hamlets that started about 2 km north of LZ Dog and extended 4 km further up the plain. Company A, 2/7th Cavalry understrength at two rifle platoons because of the crash three days earlier, entered the area at Landing Zone 2 and pushed north through rice paddies. Company B flew to Firebase Steel to secure it for an artillery battery.

Company C deployed by helicopter to the northern edge of the target in order to sweep to the southwest. The sandy plain where it set down, Landing Zone 4, (14.53°N 109.024°E) seemed safe, a relatively open tract in the hamlet of Phung Du 2 with a graveyard in its midst and tall palm trees on three sides. Company C omitted the artillery preparation that normally preceded a landing due to the proximity of the village. The first helicopter lift landed at LZ 4 at 08:25, with no PAVN/VC reaction. When the second lift came ten minutes later however, the PAVN 7th Battalion, 22nd Regiment, entrenched in earthworks, palm groves and bamboo thickets throughout the hamlet, poured mortar and machine gun fire into the landing zone. Company C commander, Captain Fesmire waved the second flight away, expecting the troops to be dropped at an alternative landing zone a few hundred meters to the southwest. Instead, they ended up at four nearby but scattered locations. Returning ten minutes later with a third lift, the helicopters unloaded the men at a fifth site. By 08:45 Company C was on the ground, but the unit was so fragmented and enemy fire so intense that the various parts found maneuver difficult and effective communication with one another impossible. Meanwhile, heavy rain impeded the provision of adequate air support, and the men were so dispersed that artillery was of little use. American casualties soon littered the hamlet ground.

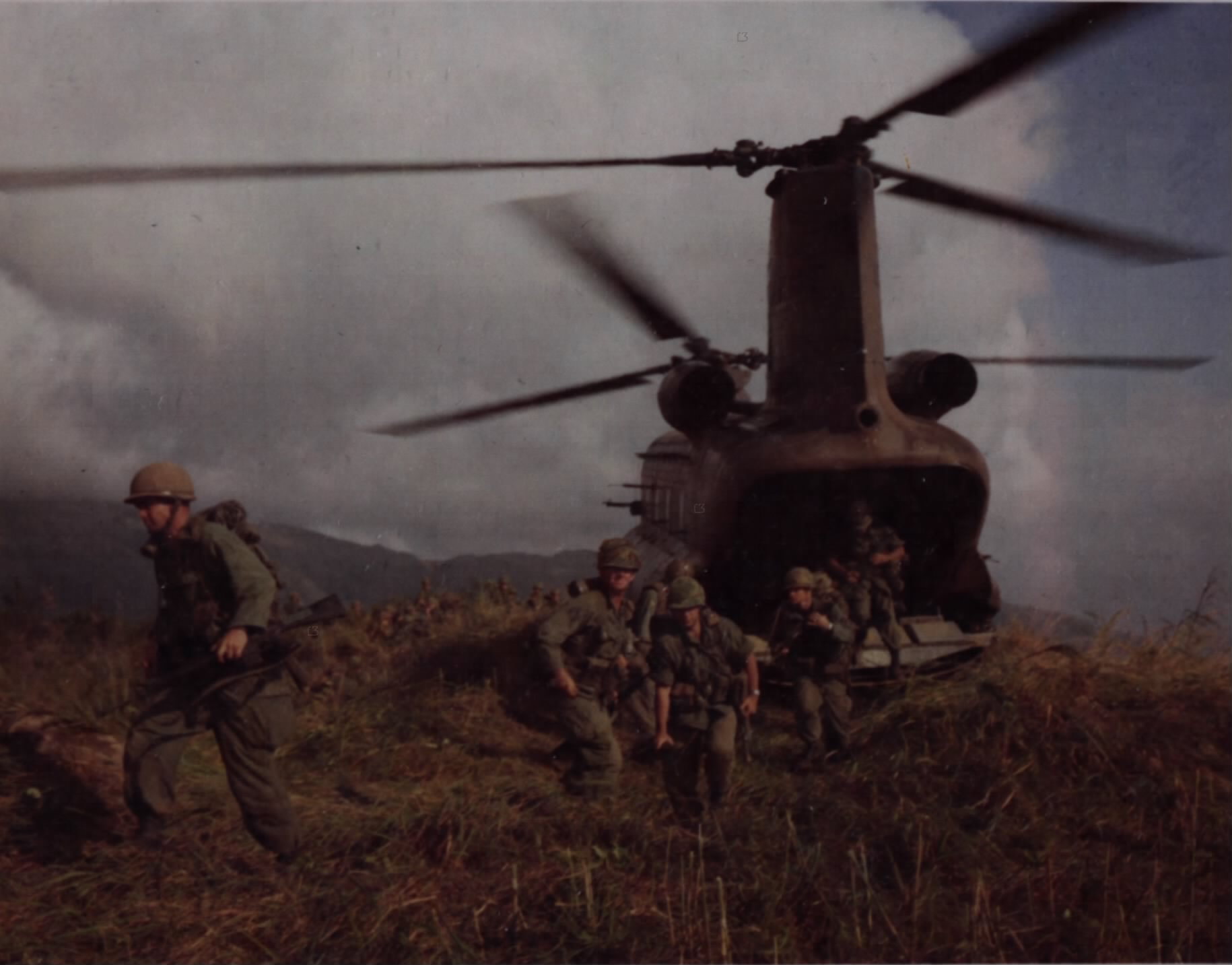
1st Cavalry troops deploy from a CH-47 onto LZ 5, 3 February

McDade ordered Company A to reinforce Company C but when they reached the southern edge of the landing zone, they also came under fire. Although the men formed a perimeter near a paddy dike, they were soon pinned down and never reached Company C. Early in the afternoon McDade joined Company A, but to no effect. Finally, six helicopters carrying reinforcements from Company B reached LZ 4. But the effort generated so much PAVN fire that all six were hit and two were driven off. Only the command group and part of one platoon were able to land and they quickly found themselves in a cross fire. Under heavy rain McDade managed to locate the fragmented Company C and succeeded in bringing in artillery support. Meanwhile, the darkness and poor weather gave Fesmire the cover he needed to pull Company C together. As he prepared to settle in for the night, he received orders from McDade to move south, closer to the rest of the battalion. Under heavy fire, he completed the linkup at 04:30 (14.523°N 109.024°E). Along with 20 wounded, his men carried with them the bodies of eight killed.

After dawn on 29 January the low overcast lifted, and fighter-bombers pounded the area to McDade's north, detonating PAVN ammunition and causing large fires. Soon after, McDade's companies, reinforced by 2/12th Cavalry, swept north to eliminate the last PAVN from the hamlet. But the clearing operation took another day, and was completed only when elements of 1/7th Cavalry joined the sweep out of the landing zone.

From then on combat tapered off and Kinnard ordered an end to that phase of the operation, effective at 12:00 on 4 February. The 3rd Brigade had cleared elements of the 22nd Regiment from the coastal plain claiming 566 PAVN/VC killed. US losses were 123 dead (including the 42 troops and four crew killed in the C-123 crash) and two helicopters were shot down and 29 damaged.

=== Phase Two: An Lao valley ===
On 28 January three Project DELTA U.S. Special Forces teams consisting of 17 personnel were inserted in the An Lao Valley for reconnaissance. The teams ran into immediate trouble and when rescued a day later seven had been killed and three wounded. Project DELTA Commander Major Charles Beckwith was seriously wounded while extracting the teams. The 1st Cavalry was unable to provide support due to the fight at LZ 4. Beckwith was criticized for going into the An Lao valley, under VC control for 15 years, without South Vietnamese counterparts and ground intelligence and in poor weather.

The An Lao Valley and the surrounding highlands were the next target of the 1st Cavalry. Kinnard believed that the headquarters of the PAVN 3rd Division were located there. Bad weather delayed the beginning of the operation to 6 February. The U.S. Marines blocked the northern entrance of the valley, the ARVN blocked the southern entrance, and three battalions were landed in the valley, however the PAVN/VC forces had withdrawn. The 1st Cavalry discovered large caches of rice and defensive works, but reported killing only 11 PAVN/VC soldiers at a loss to American forces of 49 wounded.

The U.S. offered to assist the inhabitants in the An Lao valley to leave the valley and escape from PAVN/VC rule and 4,500 of 8,000 occupants did so. The U.S. reported that 3,000 people were moved by U.S. helicopter, the others leaving the valley on foot.

=== Phase Three: Kim Son Valley ===
The Kim Son Valley consisted of seven small river valleys about 15 miles (24 km) southwest of Bồng Sơn. Three American battalions were deployed to the valley. On 11 February the 1st Cavalry established ambush positions in the highlands at the exits to each of the valleys and on 12 February began a sweep up the valley and outward, hoping to catch the PAVN/VC as they retreated. Initially unsuccessful, over the next few days the number of enemy dead slowly mounted as the result of over a dozen clashes with the Americans. On the morning of 15 February a platoon from Company B, 2/7th Cavalry, came under small-arms and mortar fire while patrolling about 4 km southeast of Firebase Bird, near the valley center. Captain Diduryk, the company commander, initially estimated that the opposing force was no larger than a reinforced platoon, but it soon became apparent that he had bumped into at least two companies occupying a 300m long position running along a jungled streambank and up a hillside. Intelligence later identified the force as part of the VC 93rd Battalion, 2nd Regiment. Fire from Company B's mortar platoon, from helicopter gunships and Skyraiders and from artillery at Firebase Bird pounded the PAVN, then Diduryk's men attacked. One platoon fixed bayonets and charged the dug-in defenders across the stream. A second pushed north to block an escape route, and a third stayed in reserve. Unnerved by the frontal assault, the VC retreated in disorder. Many stumbled into the open and were quickly killed. Those who survived fled to the north, where they came within range of the waiting platoon. A smaller group attempted to escape southward but came under fire from the reserve platoon, which took many prisoners, including 93rd Battalion commander Lt. Col. Dong Doan who inadvertently provided his interrogators with enough information to identify the locations of both his regiment and its headquarters. During the fight Company B killed 59 VC and possibly another 90 for the loss of two killed.

On 16 February Kinnard decided to replace Colonel Moore's brigade with Col. Elvy B. Roberts' 1st Brigade. The next day, the 1st and 2nd Battalions, 7th Cavalry, returned to Camp Radcliff, while 1/12th Cavalry remained behind to join 1st Battalion, 8th Cavalry Regiment and 2/8th Cavalry. Together, the three battalions combed the area around Firebase Bird, but the PAVN/VC remained in hiding. Frustrated, on 22 February Roberts changed the direction of the hunt, dispatching 1/12th Cavalry to search Go Chai Mountain, 14 km east of Bird and 7 km west of Highway 1. During the afternoon of 23 February 1/12th Cavalry met an estimated PAVN company, probably from the 7th Battalion, 12th Regiment. They maintained contact until dark, but then the PAVN escaped. Operations in the area continued until the 27th, but when nothing more of substance occurred, Kinnard decided to abandon the Kim Son Valley. That evening he attached two battalions from 1st Brigade to 2nd Brigade and returned the 1st's command group and 1/12th Cavalry to Camp Radcliff. In all, the 1st Brigade had accounted for up to 160 PAVN/VC killed while losing 29 of its own men.

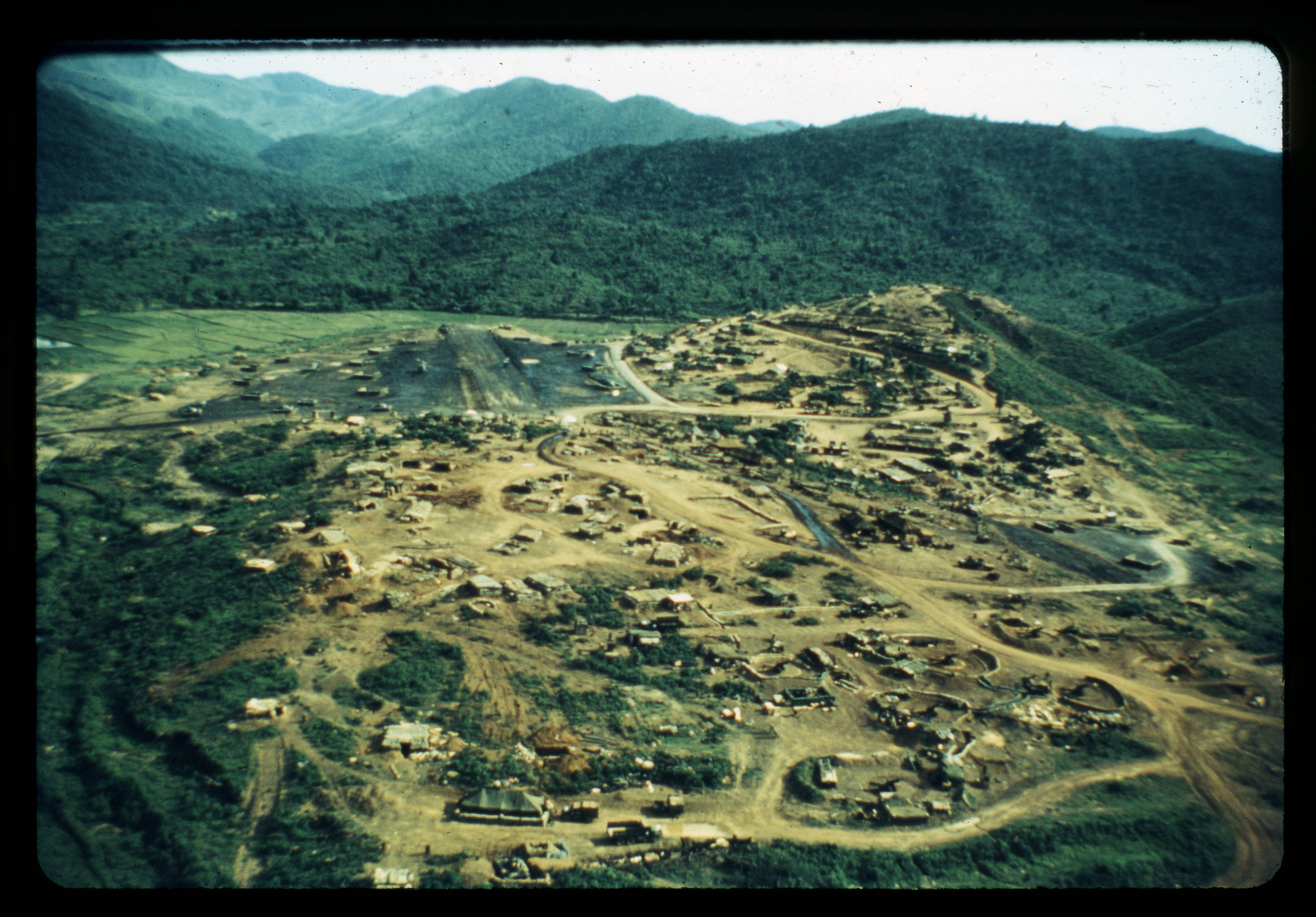
LZ Pony, 29 April 1967

While the 1st and 3rd Brigades were patrolling the Kim Son Valley between 11 and 27 February, Colonel William R. Lynch's 2nd Brigade closed down operations north of the Lai Giang and transferred his command post to Landing Zone Pony just east of the valley. The move was triggered by Colonel Doan's revelation that the 2nd Regiment was operating in the mountains southeast of Pony, information that seemed to be confirmed when radio intercepts indicated the presence of a major PAVN/VC headquarters there. On 16 February Lynch began a block and sweep of the suspected terrain. Lt Col. Meyer's 2nd Battalion, 5th Cavalry Regiment, set up three blocking positions: Recoil, roughly 6 km east of the Kim Son Valley; Joe, 4 km southwest of Recoil; and Mike, just over 2 km north of Recoil. The sweep force, 1/5th Cavalry, plus a battery of the 1st Battalion, 77th Artillery Regiment, helicoptered to Landing Zone Coil approximately 6 km northeast of Recoil. 2/12th Cavalry remained near Pony as a reserve. At 06:30, on 17 February, the battery at Coil began pounding the area between Coil and Recoil. As the barrage lifted, two companies of 1/5th Cavalry moved off towards the three blocking positions. One of the companies moved out to establish a fourth blocking position east of Recoil, but before the men had gone more than a kilometer they were engulfed by fire from upslope. After calling in air strikes and artillery, Meyer directed one of his rifle companies to reinforce, but on its way it became so heavily engaged that it could not advance. Meyer then committed his third rifle company, and Colonel Lynch ordered 2/12th Cavalry to send a company as well. In the end, the cumulative weight of the American ground attack and the artillery and air strikes drove the VC from the heights, killing at least 127 VC and captured and destroyed three mortars, five recoilless rifles and a quantity of ammunition, leading Lynch to conclude that he had crushed the 2nd Regiment's heavy weapons battalion.

During the early afternoon of 18 February two platoons from Lt. Col. Ackerson's 1/5th Cavalry came under heavy fire while patrolling. With the platoons pinned down, Ackerson reinforced with two rifle companies, but fire from earthworks cut them apart, and casualties were left where they fell. At the end of the day the Americans broke contact to retrieve their dead and wounded. The troops labeled the sector where the roughest fighting had taken place the "Iron Triangle", because of its shape (not to be confused with the better-known Iron Triangle near Saigon). The fighting continued on the 19th. Company B, 2/12th Cavalry joined Company C, 2/5th Cavalry on a sweep southwest of the Iron Triangle. When one of the companies drew fire in the morning, the other attempted to turn the enemy's flank but ran into more VC. After breaking contact and calling in artillery and air strikes, the two companies attacked, killing 36 VC and forcing the remainder to withdraw. 1/5th Cavalry, meanwhile, renewed its assault into the triangle, with two companies moving west while the third blocked. But the VC stood their ground, stalling the advance. At dark, the 1/5th Cavalry broke contact to remove their wounded. The next day, 20 February, Lynch ordered Ackerson to continue his attack. Following a morning artillery strike, one of the companies came under fire from a strongpoint no more than 100m from the scene of the previous day's fighting. The Americans pulled back and called in artillery. In the afternoon a 2/12th Cavalry unit fought a running battle that left 23 VC dead before the VC withdrew.

On 21 February, attacks and counterthrusts were carried out by both sides. 2/4th Cavalry and 2/12th Cavalry patrolled around their landing zones, while a platoon from 1/5th Cavalry probed the site of the previous day's combat. Once again, intense VC fire forced the Americans to withdraw. Then, having arranged for air support, Lynch pulled all of his units out of the Iron Triangle. B-52s struck the site at midmorning and again in the afternoon. A tactical air mission then dropped 300 Tear gas grenades into the area. As evening approached, two companies of 1/5th Cavalry advanced toward the triangle but stopped before entering it when darkness fell. Artillery fired over 700 rounds into the redoubt and an AC-47 gunship dropped illumination flares throughout the night. During the action a psychological operations team circled overhead in a loudspeaker plane, broadcasting the message that further resistance would be futile and dropping safe conduct passes. On 22 February, 1/5th Cavalry moved in to find bunkers, foxholes, and trenches, but no live enemy. Although 41 bodies remained at the site, blood trails, bloody bandages and discarded weapons indicated that many more had been killed or wounded. Colonel Lynch insisted that the operation would have been even more successful if the two B-52 strikes had been timed more closely together. Instead, the delay between the first and the second bombing runs had prevented mopping up operations that might have kept more of the VC from escaping.

During the fight in the Iron Triangle American ground and air forces had killed at least 313 VC and possibly 400 more. The Americans also estimated that the VC had suffered some 900 wounded. Following the operation, one report observed, the entire valley floor reeked with the smell of VC dead. In addition to decimating the heavy weapons battalion of the 2nd Regiment, Colonel Lynch believed that his units had inflicted heavy losses on the Regiment's headquarters and its 93rd and 95th Battalions. The cost to the 2nd Brigade was 23 killed and 106 wounded. Colonel Lynch's brigade rested for a few days before resuming operations on 25 February. Over the next three days his men exchanged fire with small groups of PAVN/VC but failed to generate significant contacts.

Early in the morning of 28 February a patrol from Company B, 1/5th Cavalry came under sniper fire less than 2 km south of Pony. Unable to locate the sniper position, the patrol members continued their advance. Entering the hamlet of Tan Thanh 2, they met a hail of fire and suffered 4 wounded. As they pushed deeper into the settlement, automatic weapons opened up on them. They responded with grenades and small arms but soon came under attack on the right flank by 15-20 VC, who killed eight of them within minutes and wounded a number more. As the Americans scrambled for cover, the VC emerged from hiding to strip the U.S. dead of their weapons. A relief force arrived a short while later but by then the VC were gone.

=== Phase Four: Cay Giap mountains ===
Based on prisoner interrogations, American intelligence believed that the PAVN 6th Battalion, 12th Regiment was operating in the Cay Giep Mountains 5 miles (8.0 km) east of Bồng Sơn. General Kinnard wanted to encircle and annihilate it. The ARVN 22nd Division surrounded the target area, deploying along the Lai Giang to the north, Highway 1 to the west, and the Tra O Marsh in the south, while the division's junk fleet patrolled the coast to prevent escape by sea. Colonel Lynch's 2d Brigade would conduct the attack. At 07:30 on 1 March an intense hour-long air, land and sea bombardment of intended landing zones began. When the firing stopped, the designated sweep force 2/5th Cavalry, 1/8th Cavalry and 2/8th Cavalry came in over the mountains. However the assault forces found that the bombardment had hardly dented the thick foliage, and the helicopters were unable to land. Eventually, additional air strikes opened holes in the jungle canopy wide enough to allow the men to reach the ground by scrambling down rope ladders suspended from the hovering helicopters. Once deployed, the three battalions, soon joined by 1/5th Cavalry, searched the area and found little, although an ARVN unit near the Tra O Marsh killed about 50 PAVN who were attempting to flee the dragnet. On 4 March, following word from South Vietnamese civilians that most of the PAVN had left the area around the end of February, Kinnard decided that the operation had run its course and over the next two days returned the 2nd Brigade to Camp Radcliff.

== Operation Double Eagle ==
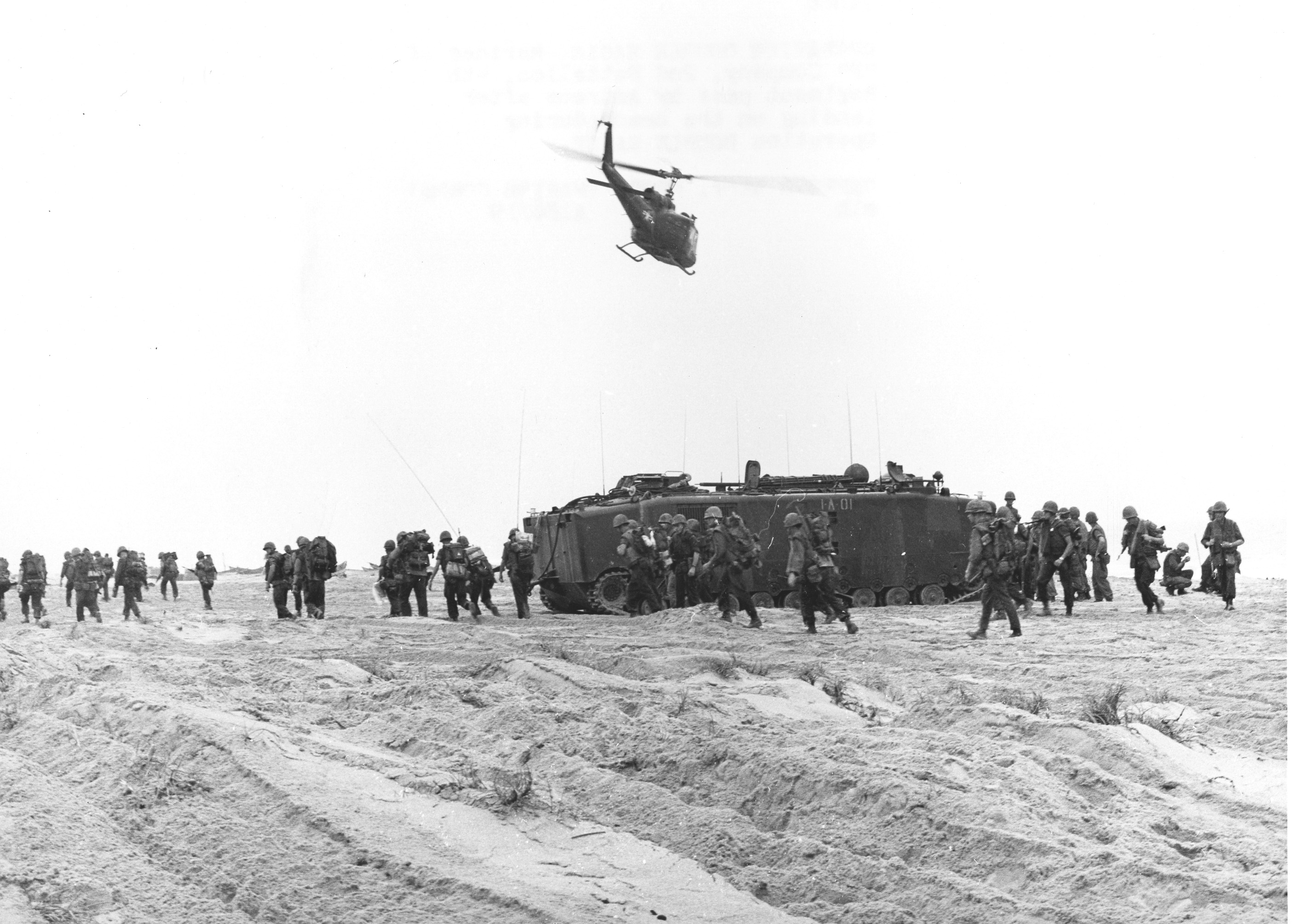
Company F, 2/4 Marines pass an LVT-5 during Operation Double Eagle

Operation Double Eagle, carried out by U.S. and South Vietnamese marines, was a complementary mission to Operation Masher in neighboring Quảng Ngãi Province adjoining Binh Dinh province to the north. Operation Double Eagle was carried out over an area of about 500 square miles (1,300 km^{2}) about 25 miles (40 km) north to south and extending as much as 20 miles (32 km) inland from the South China Sea. 6,000 regular troops and 600 guerrillas were believed to be operating within this area. U.S. Marines dedicated to the operation would number more than 5,000 plus several thousand South Vietnamese soldiers of the ARVN 2nd Division.

Operation Double Eagle began on 28 January with the largest amphibious assault of the Vietnam War and the largest since the Korean War. Bad weather hampered the early days of the operation, but the Marines pushed slowly inland. The plan was for the Marines to push southward into Binh Dinh province where they would meet the 1st Cavalry advancing northward in Operation Masher, trapping PAVN/VC forces between them. In reality, the Marines found few PAVN/VC soldiers in their operating area, the main force PAVN regiments having withdrawn from the area a few days prior to the amphibious landing. The Marines claimed to have killed 312 PAVN/VC soldiers and captured 19 at a loss of 24 Marines killed.

Marine Corps Commandant General Victor Krulak later said that Operation Double Eagle had failed because the PAVN and VC had been forewarned. He also said that Operation Double Eagle was a failure because it showed the people of the region that the Marines "would come in, comb the area and disappear; whereupon the VC would resurface and resume control."

== Refugees ==
Operation Masher was carried out in heavily populated rural areas. The fighting resulted in the displacement, voluntary or involuntary, of a large number of people. The 1st Cavalry listed as a success of the operation that "140,000 Vietnamese civilians volunteered to leave their hamlets in the An Lao and Son Long valleys to return to GVN control." The "voluntary" nature of the departure or flight of many of the civilians from their land is questionable.

Operation Masher demonstrated that a consequence of large unit military operations and heavy utilization of artillery and aerial bombardment was the generation of refugees from the fighting and, inevitably, civilian casualties. The U.S. evacuated thousands of civilians by helicopter from combat areas and more thousands walked out to safety in the larger towns near the coast. The 1st Cavalry counted more than 27,000 people displaced by the operation. While many people fled the fighting, others remained for fear that if they abandoned their homes, the VC would confiscate their land and redistribute it to more dedicated supporters.

Although the U.S. Army maintained that the refugees were fleeing communism, an Army study in mid-1966 concluded that U.S. and South Vietnamese bombing and artillery fire, in conjunction with ground operations, were the immediate and prime causes of refugee movement into South Vietnamese government controlled cities and coastal areas. The U.S. considered that meeting the humanitarian needs of refugees was the responsibility of South Vietnam, but the response of the South Vietnamese government was often deficient.

An American journalist visited a camp housing 6,000 refugees from Operation Masher a week after their displacement. He found them packed 30 to a room, receiving inadequate food and medical treatment for diseases and wounds, and in a sullen and depressed mood.

== Assessment ==
Operation Masher-White Wing was considered a success by the Americans, demonstrating the capability of the helicopter-borne 1st Cavalry to conduct a sustained campaign against PAVN and VC forces and "to find, fix, and finish" the enemy. The U.S., as it had in the earlier Battle of Ia Drang, relied on the massive use of firepower. 171 B-52 strikes hit suspected PAVN/VC positions and 132,000 artillery rounds were expended—100 for each PAVN/VC soldier killed. In addition, tactical air support was provided by 600 sorties by fixed-wing aircraft. 228 1st Cavalry soldiers were killed and another 46 died in an airplane crash; 834 were wounded. 24 U.S. Marines were killed and 156 wounded in Operation Double Eagle and several additional Americans from other units were killed. 11 ROK were reported killed; South Vietnamese casualties are not known. The U.S. claimed to have killed 1,342 PAVN/VC. The ARVN and ROK forces reported they had killed an additional 808 PAVN/VC. Further claims of 300-600 PAVN/VC were taken prisoner and 500 defected and an additional 1,746 were estimated killed. 52 crew-served weapons and 202 individual weapons were captured or recovered.

The PAVN claimed victory, stating that the 3rd Division had eliminated more than 2,000 enemy troops (killed, wounded or captured).^{:chapter 4}

While US/ARVN had claimed operational success, PAVN/VC sources claim they evaded operation.

An unknown number of people killed were civilians, and under the standard operating rules at the time those who did not 'voluntarily' leave free-fire zone were generally regarded as VC. Total number of civilians killed is largely unknown, but one estimate was that there were 6 civilians casualties for every VC. The US called these allegations exaggerated and blamed the VC for many deaths because of tactics which endangered civilians such as recruiting civilians and firing from populated areas. These issues were raised in the Fulbright Hearings. ROK troops of the Capital Division were alleged to have killed over 1,000 civilians in the Bình An/Tây Vinh massacre.

Despite this operation being the biggest search-and-destroy operation in the war up to that point, most of the PAVN/VC forces had slipped away and re-appeared in the region a few months later. An estimated 125,000 people within the Binh Dinh province had lost their homes as a result of Operation Masher/White Wing.

The positive results cited by the Americans appear to have been only transitory. The 1st Cavalry cited among the favorable consequences of Operation Masher that it had given the local population "a chance to be freed from VC domination by moving to areas which are under government control" and stated that the South Vietnamese government "intends to reestablish civil government in the area." PAVN/VC influence, however, continued to be extensive in Binh Dinh province. Two months later, in Operation Crazy Horse, the 1st Cavalry was back sweeping part of the same area covered by Operation Masher and in October 1966 Operation Thayer began an extended effort by the 1st Cavalry once again to "fully pacify" Binh Dinh province.

A Joint Chiefs of Staff memo reported by The Wall Street Journal in 1966 urged President Johnson to "expand" the use of non-lethal chemicals in South Vietnam. The use of 3-Quinuclidinyl benzilate or Agent BZ was alleged in Operation White Wing by journalist Pierre Darcourt in L'Express news magazine. The allegation concerned an offensive and the 1st Cavalry Division in March 1966 during Operation "White Wing."
