= Firebase Bird =

US Army base in Vietnam (1966–1967)

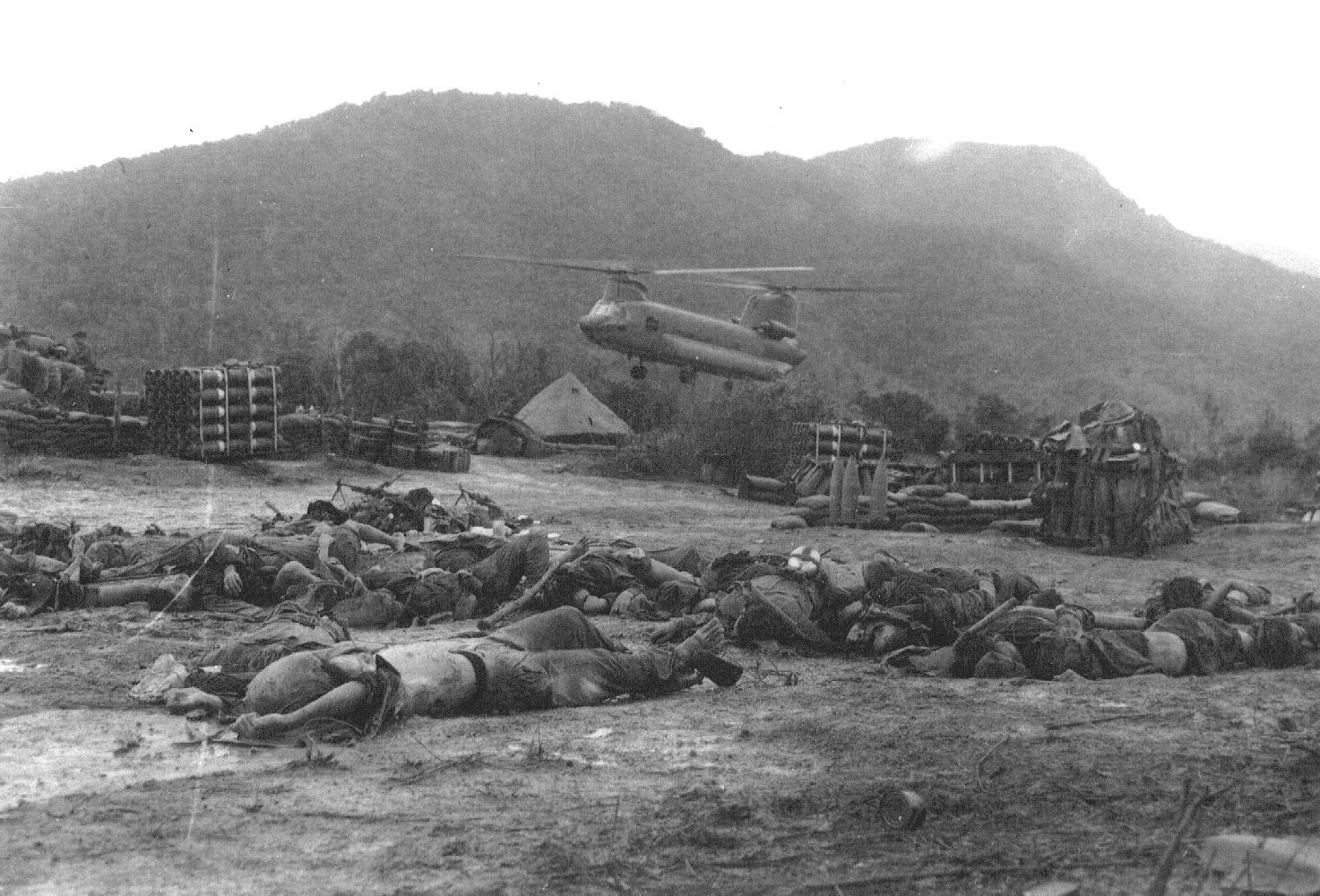
- PAVN dead at Bird, 27 December 1966

Site information
- Type: Army
- Condition: abandoned

Location
- Coordinates: 14.296°N 108.888°E

Site history
- Built: 1966
- In use: 1966–7
- Battles/wars: Vietnam War

Garrison information
- Occupants: 1st Battalion, 12th Cavalry; 6th Battalion, 16th Artillery; 2nd Battalion, 19th Artillery

Firebase Bird was a U.S. Army firebase located in the Kim Son Valley in southern Vietnam during the Vietnam War.

In December 1966 Bird was occupied by C Battery 6th Battalion, 16th Artillery and B Battery 2nd Battalion, 19th Artillery and defended by elements of the 1st Battalion, 12th Cavalry. On the early morning of 27 December after preparatory mortar fire Bird was attacked by 3 Battalions of the People's Army of Vietnam (PAVN) 22nd Regiment. The PAVN quickly breached the perimeter and occupied all the 155mm and some of the 105mm gun pits. The remaining guns of 2/19 Artillery were then used to fire Beehive rounds directly at the PAVN stopping the attack. Supporting artillery fire was called in from nearby Firebase Pony and helicopter gunships also arrived to give supporting fire, forcing the PAVN to retreat.

U.S. losses at Firebase Bird were 27 dead and 67 wounded, more than 60 percent of the defenders, while the U.S. claimed that PAVN losses in the attack and a four-day pursuit of the attackers were 267 dead.

Acts of valor were recognized. Piper and Crain earned the Distinguished Service Cross. The Silver Star went to Spec. 4 Turnage, Campanella, Staff Sgt. Gregerio Nieto, Spec. 4 Frederick Weidman, and Spec. 4 David Osborne. Five of those killed also received Silver Stars.

B Battery 2/19 Artillery was awarded a Presidential Unit Citation for its actions, while SSGT Delbert O. Jennings would be awarded the Medal of Honor for his actions during the battle.

The attack on Bird was the subject of the book Bird by military historian S.L.A. Marshall. Today the base has reverted to jungle.
