= Delbert O. Jennings =

United States Army Medal of Honor recipient

Delbert Owen Jennings
- Army Medal of Honor
- Born: July 23, 1936; Silver City, New Mexico, US
- Died: March 16, 2003 (aged 66); Honolulu, Hawaii, US
- Burial place: Arlington National Cemetery
- Military career
- Allegiance: United States of America
- Branch: United States Army
- Service years: 1956 - 1985
- Rank: Command Sergeant Major
- Units: 12th Cavalry Regiment, 1st Cavalry Division
- Conflicts: Vietnam War
- Awards: Medal of Honor

Delbert Owen Jennings (July 23, 1936 – March 16, 2003) was a United States Army soldier and a recipient of the United States military's highest decoration—the Medal of Honor—for his actions in the Vietnam War.

== Biography ==
Jennings joined the Army from San Francisco, California in 1956, and by December 27, 1966, was serving as a staff sergeant in Company C, 1st Battalion (Airborne), 12th Cavalry Regiment, 1st Air Cavalry Division. On that day, at Firebase Bird in the Kim Song Valley in the Republic of Vietnam, Jennings' unit came under heavy enemy attack. For his actions during the battle, he was awarded the Medal of Honor.

He was also stationed at (then) Camp A.P. Hill, Virginia, in 1968-1969 as the Headquarters Company First Sergeant, and in 1969-1971 with the 6th Infantry in [then] West Berlin, Germany.

Jennings reached the rank of Command Sergeant Major before leaving the Army in 1985. He died at age 66 and was buried in Arlington National Cemetery, Arlington County, Virginia.

== Medal of Honor citation ==
Staff Sergeant Jennings' official Medal of Honor citation reads:

For conspicuous gallantry and intrepidity at the risk of life above and beyond the call of duty. Part of Company C was defending an artillery position when attacked by a North Vietnamese Army regiment supported by mortar, recoilless-rifle, and machine gun fire. At the outset, S/Sgt. Jennings sprang to his bunker, astride the main attack route, and slowed the on-coming enemy wave with highly effective machine gun fire. Despite a tenacious defense in which he killed at least 12 of the enemy, his squad was forced to the rear. After covering the withdrawal of the squad, he rejoined his men, destroyed an enemy demolition crew about to blow up a nearby howitzer, and killed 3 enemy soldiers at his initial bunker position. Ordering his men back into a secondary position, he again covered their withdrawal, killing 1 enemy with the butt of his weapon. Observing that some of the defenders were unaware of an enemy force in their rear, he raced through a fire-swept area to warn the men, turn their fire on the enemy, and lead them into the secondary perimeter. Assisting in the defense of the new position, he aided the air-landing of reinforcements by throwing white phosphorus grenades on the landing zone despite dangerously silhouetting himself with the light. After helping to repulse the final enemy assaults, he led a group of volunteers well beyond friendly lines to an area where 8 seriously wounded men lay. Braving enemy sniper fire and ignoring the presence of booby traps in the area, they recovered the 8 men who would have probably perished without early medical treatment. S/Sgt. Jenning's extraordinary heroism and inspirational leadership saved the lives of many of his comrades and contributed greatly to the defeat of a superior enemy force. His actions stand with the highest traditions of the military profession and reflect great credit upon himself, his unit, and the U.S. Army.

== See also ==
- List of Medal of Honor recipients
- List of Medal of Honor recipients for the Vietnam War
