= 3rd Battalion, 16th Field Artillery Regiment =

3rd Battalion, 16th Field Artillery
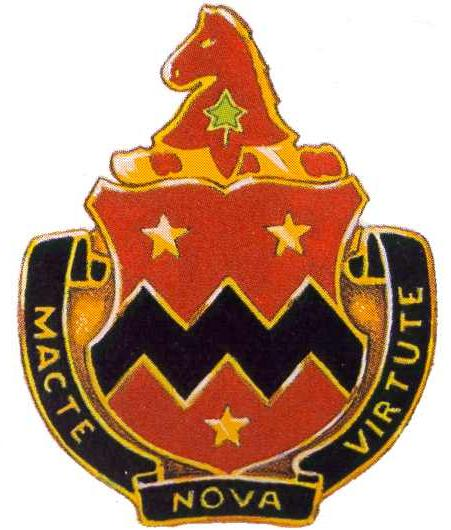
- Regimental distinctive insignia of the 16th Field Artillery
- Active: 1916–
- Country: (United States)
- Branch: United States Army
- Type: Field artillery
- Role: Brigade Combat Team cannon battalion
- Size: Battalion
- Part of: 1st Cavalry Division Artillery
- Garrison/HQ: Fort Hood
- Motto: "Macte Nova Virtute" (Go Forth With New Strength)
- Engagements: World War II; Vietnam War; Operation Iraqi Freedom; Operation Enduring Freedom

Commanders
- Battalion Commander: LTC Timothy Martin
- Command Sergeant Major: CSM Anthony Bush

The 3rd Battalion, 16th Field Artillery Regiment is a field artillery battalion assigned to the 2nd Brigade Combat Team, 1st Cavalry Division. Carrying the lineage of Battery C, 16th Field Artillery Regiment, the battalion carries campaign streamers from World War I, World War II, and Vietnam, and has served with the 4th Infantry Division and 8th Infantry Division. The unit's nickname is "Rolling Thunder", and their motto is "Macte Nova Virtute" (Go Forth With New Strength). The battalion is composed of a headquarters and headquarters battery (HHB), three cannon batteries (Batteries A, B, and C), and has an attached Forward Support Company, Company F, 15th Brigade Support Battalion.

== History ==
Constituted on 1 July 1916 in the Regular Army as Battery C, 16th Field Artillery, the unit was organized on 21 May 1917 at Camp Robinson, Wisconsin. On 19 November 1917, the 16th Field Artillery was assigned to the 4th Division. The unit was inactivated on 21 September 1921 at Camp Lewis, Washington. The 16th Field Artillery was relieved on 24 March 1923 from assignment to the 4th Division and assigned to the 8th Division.

On 13 January 1941, the battalion was reorganized and redesignated as Battery C, 16th Field Artillery Battalion. In June 1942, the battalion was again reorganized and redesignated as Battery C, 16th Armored Field Artillery Battalion, an element of the 9th Armored Division. The 16th Armored Field Artillery Battalion was activated on 10 November 1950 at Fort Hood, Texas.

On 1 July 1957, the battalion was redesignated as Headquarters and Headquarters Battery, 3rd Battalion, 16th Field Artillery.

The battalion was assigned to the 8th Infantry Division at Baumholder, Germany in the 1970s. Batteries at the time included HQ, Service, A, B, and C.

In late 1983, the entire 8-in C battery was folded into A, and B batteries to make room for the first Multiple Launch Rocket System (MLRS) battery in Europe.

On 15 December 1995, the battalion was activated as the 3rd Battalion, 16th Field Artillery at Fort Hood, Texas and assigned to the 4th Infantry Division.

The 16th Field Artillery Regiment has a very distinguished history. To its credit, the battalion participated in numerous campaigns during World War 1, to Include the Aisne-Marne, St. Mihiel, Meuse-argonne, and Champagne 1918.

During World War II, the 16th Artillery served in Rhineland, Ardennes-alsace and Central Europe. During the Vietnam War, the 16th Field Artillery is credited with participation in the Counteroffensive, Phase I, Tet Counteroffensive, Tet 69 Couteroffensive and the Sanctuary Counteroffensive. The battalion's decorations include the Presidential Unit Citation and the Republic of Vietnam Cross-of Gallantry with Palm. Additionally, a battery was awarded the Valorous Unit Award for participation in the Quang Tin Province.

The Ivy Leaf on the battalion's insignia represented its long standing relationship with the 4th Infantry Division. The 3rd Battalion, 16th Field Artillery continued this relationship as the command and control headquarters for "Task Force Thunder", an element of the 2nd Brigade Combat Team in support of Operation Iraqi Freedom. The battalion remained prepared to deploy anywhere in the world to synchronize and provide fires in support of sustained, decisive full spectrum operations to achieve assigned objectives.

Upon arriving at the port in Kuwait, the soldiers of the Rolling Thunder battalion went into action and downloaded all of its equipment in a record manner. Once downloaded, the equipment was moved to the staging area for forward movement to Camp Udairi, 22 km south of the Iraqi border. While at Udairi, the Thunder battalion prepared for its follow-on mission. The battalion conducted live fire weapons calibration and verified all small arms and crew served weapons systems.

The first element of the Rolling Thunder battalion to cross the Kuwait – Iraq border was B battery on 27 April 2003. The remaining elements of the battalion crossed the border of Kuwait and Iraq on 4 May 2003 at approximately 0520 hours. The battalion's wheel convoy was provided MP escort for added security. The battalion was en route to AA Horse just south of Baghdad to marry up with its tracked vehicles. Once the battalion linked up with its equipment, the call forward order was received and the battalion continued its march to its base position at the Baqubah airfield in northern Iraq. Here, the battalion was to join the lead elements of the 2nd Brigade Combat Team, Warhorse Brigade. Upon arrival, the soldiers immediately begin to establish their base camp – Thunder Land.

B battery was tasked to the DIVARTY headquarters as part of Task Force Gunner. Their mission was to assist in securing the Taji Airfield. A and C batteries were further task organized to Task Force 2–8 Infantry (Talon) and Task Force 3–67 Armor (Hounds of Hell) respectively. A battery was given the mission to secure a weapons and munitions site north of the Tigris River Dam. Apache comes under hostile fire nightly. The soldiers of Cyclone were given the mission to provide direct artillery support to 3–67 Armor as it sought to secure the main MEK compound 75 km north of Baqubah. Additionally, Cyclone manned a checkpoint north of the compound in an effort to disarm freedom fighters and secure the area around the MEK compound. The Headquarters Service battery remained at Thunder Land at the Baqubah airfield, to provide logistical and administrative support to the batteries.

The locations of the batteries spread the Thunder battalion over a 100 km radius.

On 25 May 2003, C battery was released from its direct support role with Task Force 3–67 and became the primary element of Task Force Thunder. The mission of the task force was to secure and disarm the town of Balad 60 km northwest of Baqubah. Immediately, the soldiers of Task Force Thunder established and manned checkpoints to confiscate weapons. On 31 May, checkpoint 4 of C battery came under hostile enemy fire from small arms and RPGs. Injuries were minor and the soldiers fought off the attackers. On 2 June 2003, at approximately 1147 hours, the soldiers of checkpoint No. 1 came under attack from hostile forces, and the soldiers again fought valiantly and fought off their attackers. This time the injuries were much more severe and resulted in the first casualty for the Warhorse Brigade and Rolling Thunder. SGT Anatancio Haro of 3rd Howitzer section was killed while engaging the attackers. The battalion conducted a memorial service in his honor on 4 June 2003.

On 15 June 2003, C Battery and TF Thunder received a change of mission and were relieved by 3–7 Cav 3ID. C Battery and TF Thunder were ordered to reorganize and received a new mission with duty in the cities Al Husseinia, Ar Rashidiyah and Khan Bani Sad, north of Baghdad just east of the Tigris River. It was during this time that TF Thunder succeeded in creating security and stability for over 750,000 Iraqis and conducted the first CPA (Coalition Provisional Authority) sanctioned democratic elections in the Baghdad Province in December 2003. In addition to numerous civil affairs projects to help the Iraqis in the region, TF Thunder was known for being willing to use force, but being judicious in its application. This gained tremendous respect among the local Iraqis and set the conditions for no further soldiers killed in action during this deployment.

On 1 August 2004, the 4th Infantry Division (Mech) was ordered to restructure and reorganize under the U.S. Army's concept of modularity. This would set the division to become the Army's first fully digitized modular division. The 2nd Brigade Combat Team would lead the conversion and become the Army's first modular Brigade Combat Team – "Unit of Action". Under the restructure, the Thunder Battalion reorganized and became the first modular "fires battalion". This meant the battalion would no longer be assigned to the Division Artillery but would fall under the total control of the 2 Brigade. On 1 January 2005, the Thunder Battalion completed its conversion with the activation of its support company, G Company, 204th Support Battalion. The unit's mission was to maintain warfighting readiness and, on order, deploy by land, sea, or air to conduct combat operations by coordinating fire support that provides safe, timely, and lethal fires in support of the 2nd Brigade Combat Team, 4th Infantry Division.

As of January 2006, OIF 05-07, the 3rd Battalion – 16th Field Artillery Regiment was deployed to Forward Operating Base Duke, located in Najaf, Iraq, as well as Forward Operating Base Kalsu and FOB Falcon in Southern Baghdad in support of Operation Iraqi Freedom. Most of the unit, along with the rest of the 2nd Brigade, 4th Infantry Division was tasked with training Iraqi Security Forces so that they can conduct operations independently of coalition troops, with the exception of 2 squads from B Battery, guns (M109A6 PALDIN) B15 and B18 who conducted live counter-fire operations in support of 1-67 Armour and 2-8 Infantry (Mechanized), both of 2nd BCT, 4ID.

== Lineage and honors ==
=== Lineage ===
- Constituted 1 July 1916 in the regular army as Battery C, 16th Field artillery.
- Organized 21 May 1917 at Camp Robinson, Wisconsin.

(16th Field artillery assigned 19 November 1917 to the 4th division.)

- Inactivated 21 September 1921 at Camp Lewis, Washington.
- Activated 14 December 1922 at Fort Myer, Virginia.

(16th Field Artillery relieved 24 March 1923 from assignment to the 4th Division and assigned to the 8th Division; relieved 5 September 1927 from assignment to the 8th Division and assigned to the 4th Division; relieved 1 October 1933 from assignment to the 4th Division and assigned to the 8th division; relieved 16 October 1939 from assignment to the 8th division.)

- Rreorganized and redesignated 13 January 1941 as Battery C, 16th Field artillery Battalion.
- Reorganized and redesignated 3 June 1942 as Battery C, 16th armored Field Artillery Battalion, an element of the 9th Armored Division.

(16th Armored Field artillery Battalion relieved 6 July 1945 from assignment to the 9th Armored Division.)

- Inactivated 26 July 1946 in Germany.

(16th Armored Field Artillery Battalion assigned 20 October 1950 to the 2d Armored Division.)

- Activated 10 November 1950 at Fort Hood, Texas.
- Inactivated 1 July 1957 in Germany and relieved from assignment to the 2d Armored Division; concurrently, redesignated as Headquarters and Headquarters Battery, 3d Battalion, 16th Artillery.
- Redesignated 2 June 1958 as Headquarters and Headquarters Battery, 3d Howitzer Battalion, 16th Artillery (organic elements concurrently constituted).
- Battalion activated 21 June 1958 at Fort Bragg, North Carolina.
- Redesignated 25 November 1966 as the 3d Battalion, 16th Artillery.
- Redesignated 1 September 1971 as the 3d Battalion, 16th Field Artillery.
- Inactivated 2 November 1971 at Fort Lewis, Washington.
- Assigned 13 September 1972 to the 8th Infantry Division and activated in Germany.
- Headquarters and Headquarters and Battery, 3d Battalion, 16th Field artillery, reorganized and redesignated 16 August 1987 as Battery C, 16th Field artillery (remainder of battalion concurrently inactivated).
- Battery C, 16th Field Artillery, inactivated 15 August 1991 in Germany and relieved from assignment to the 8th Infantry Division.
- Redesignated 16 January 1996 as Headquarters and Headquarters Battery, 3d Battalion, 16th Field Artillery, assigned to the 4th Infantry Division, and activated at Fort Hood, Texas (organic elements concurrently activated).

=== Campaign participation credit ===
- World War I: Aisne-Marne; St. Mihiel; Meuse-Argonne; Champagne 1918; Lorraine 1918
- World War II: Rhineland; Ardennes-Alsace; Central Europe
- Vietnam:Counteroffensive, Phase III; Tet Counteroffensive; Counteroffensive, Phase IV; Counteroffensive, Phase V; Counteroffensive, Phase VI; Tet 69/Counteroffensive; Summer–Fall 1969; Winter–Spring 1970; Sanctuary Counteroffensive; Counteroffensive, Phase VII; Consolidation I

=== Decorations ===
- Presidential Unit Citation (Army), Streamer Embroidered REMAGEN BRIDGEHEAD (16th Armored Field Artillery Battalion cited; WD GO 72, 1945)
- Cited in the Order of the Day of the Belgian Army for the action at ST. VITH (16th Armored Field Artillery Battalion cited; DA GO 43, 1950)
- Republic of Vietnam Cross of Gallantry with Palm, Streamer, embroidered VIETNAM 1969–1970 (3rd Battalion, 16th Artillery, cited; DA GO 42, 1972)
- Republic of Vietnam Cross of Gallantry with Palm, Streamer, embroidered VIETNAM 1971 (Headquarters and Headquarters Battery, 3rd Battalion, 16th Field Artillery, cited; DA GO 6, 1974)

Battery A additionally entitled to:
- Valorous Unit Award, Streamer embroidered QUANG TIN PROVINCE (Battery A, 3rd Battalion, 16th Artillery, cited; DA GO 39, 1970)

== Killed In action ==
=== Operation Iraqi Freedom ===
OIF I

- 3 June 2003 – SGT Atanacio Haro Marin Jr. – C Battery – Killed in Balad, Iraq, while manning a checkpoint and his unit came under fire from small arms and rocket propelled grenades.

OIF 05-07

- 5 January 2006 – MAJ William Hecker – Killed in An Najaf, Iraq, when an improvised explosive device detonated near their HMMWV during convoy operations.
- 5 January 2006 – CPT Christopher Petty – Killed in An Najaf, Iraq, when an improvised explosive device detonated near their HMMV during convoy operations.
- 5 January 2006 – SFC Stephen J. White – Battalion supply sergeant, Headquarters Battery – Killed in An Najaf, Iraq, when an improvised explosive device detonated near their HMMWV during convoy operations.
- 5 January 2006 – SGT Johnny J. Peralez, Jr. – Combat medic, Headquarters Battery – Killed in An Najaf, Iraq, when an improvised explosive device detonated near their HMMWV during convoy operations.
- 5 January 2006 – PVT Robbie M. Mariano – Cannon crewmember, Headquarters Battery – Killed in An Najaf, Iraq, when an improvised explosive device detonated near their HMMWV during convoy operations.
- 8 September 2006 – Sgt David W. Gordon – Cannon crewmember, Alpha Battery – Killed in Al Hillah, Iraq, on a designated patrol when an improvised explosive device detonated outside his HMMWV under normal combat operations.

24 December 2008 – SSG Christopher G. Smith, SPC Stephen M. Okray, SPC Stephen G. Zapasnik
