= 16th Field Artillery Regiment =

US military unit

- Coat of arms
- Active: 1916-present
- Country: United States
- Branch: United States Army
- Type: Field artillery
- Role: USARS parent regiment
- Size: Regiment
- Motto: Macte Nova Virtute (Go Forth With New Strength)

Insignia
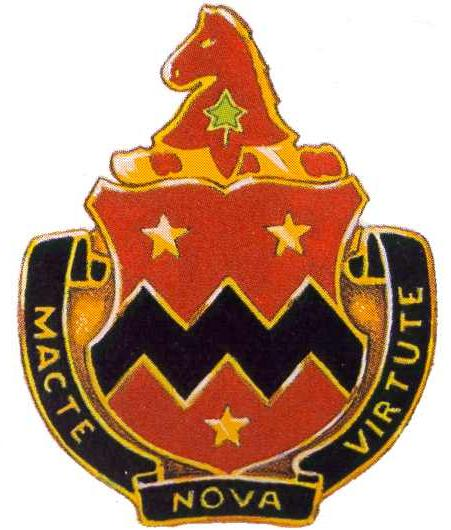
- Distinctive unit insignia

The 16th Field Artillery Regiment is a field artillery regiment of the United States Army. The regiment served with the 4th Division in World War II and with the 4th and 8th Divisions between the World Wars. As the 16th Armored Field Artillery Battalion, it served with the 9th Armored Division during World War II, and with the 2nd Armored Division after the war. Designated a parent regiment under the Combat Arms Regimental system, and later the U.S. Army Regimental System, since 1957, regimental elements have served with the 1st, 2nd and 4th Armored Divisions; the 4th, 8th, and 81st Infantry Divisions; and the 1st Cavalry Division. Regimental elements have participated in combat in Vietnam, and in Operation Iraqi Freedom. The regiment currently has a single active battalion, the 3rd Battalion, 16th Field Artillery, assigned to the 2nd Brigade Combat Team, 1st Cavalry Division and stationed at Fort Hood, Texas.

== History ==
The 16th Field Artillery was constituted 1 July 1916 in the Regular Army.

== Current Status of Regimental Elements ==
- 1st Battalion, 16th Field Artillery Regiment: Inactive
- 2nd Battalion, 16th Field Artillery Regiment: Inactive
- 3rd Battalion, 16th Field Artillery Regiment: Active, assigned to the 2nd Brigade Combat Team, 1st Cavalry Division
- 4th Battalion, 16th Field Artillery Regiment: Inactive
- 5th Battalion, 16th Field Artillery Regiment: Inactive
- 6th Battalion, 16th Field Artillery Regiment: Inactive

== Lineage and honors ==
=== Lineage ===
- Constituted 1 July 1916 in the Regular Army as the 16th Field Artillery.
- Organized 21 May 1917 at Camp Robinson, Wisconsin.
- Assigned 19 November 1917 to the 4th Division.
- Inactivated 21 September 1921 at Camp Lewis, Washington.

(1st Battalion activated 14 December 1922 at Fort Myer, Virginia.)

- Relieved 24 March 1923 from assignment to the 4th Division and assigned to the 8th Division.
- Relieved 5 September 1927 from assignment to the 8th Division and assigned to the 4th Division

(2d Battalion concurrently activated at Fort Bragg, North Carolina).

- relieved 1 October 1933 from assignment to the 4th Division and assigned to the 8th Division

(2d Battalion concurrently inactivated at Fort Bragg, North Carolina).

- Relieved 16 October 1939 from assignment to the 8th Division.
- Regiment (less 1st Battalion) activated 3 January 1941 at Fort Myer, Virginia.
- Reorganized and redesignated 13 January 1941 as the 16th Field artillery Battalion.
- Reorganized and redesignated 3 June 1942 as the 16th Armored Field Artillery Battalion and assigned to the 9th Armored Division.
- Relieved 6 July 1945 from assignment to the 9th Armored Division.
- Inactivated 26 July 1946 in Germany.
- Assigned 20 October 1950 to the 2d Armored Division.
- Activated 10 November 1950 at Fort Hood, Texas.
- Relieved 1 July 1957 from assignment to the 2d Armored Division; concurrently, reorganized and redesignated as the 16th Artillery, a parent regiment under the Combat Arms Regimental System.
- Redesignated 1 September 1971 as the 16th Field Artillery.
- Withdrawn 16 April 1987 from the Combat Arms Regimental System and reorganized under the United States Army Regimental System.

=== Campaign participation credit ===
- World War I: Aisne-Marne; St. Mihiel; Meuse-Argonne; Champagne 1918; Lorraine 1918
- World War II: Rhineland; Ardennes-Alsace; Central Europe; Consolidation I
- Vietnam: Counteroffensive, Phase II; Counteroffensive, Phase III; Tet Counteroffensive; Counteroffensive, Phase IV; Counteroffensive, Phase V; Counteroffensive, Phase VI; Tet 69/Counteroffensive; Summer–Fall 1969; Winter–Spring 1970; Sanctuary Counteroffensive; Counteroffensive, Phase VII

=== Decorations ===
- Presidential Unit Citation (Army), Streamer embroidered REMAGEN BRIDGEHEAD (16th Armored Field Artillery Battalion cited; Wd GO 72, 1945)
- Presidential Unit Citation (Army), Streamer embroidered ST. VITH (Combat Command B, 9th armored division, cited; da GO 9, 2005)
- Presidential Unit Citation (Army), Streamer embroidered PlEIKU PROVINCE (5th Battalion, 16th Artillery, cited; da GO 69, 1969)
- Meritorious Unit Commendation (Army), Streamer embroidered VIETNAM 1968–1969 (Battery F, 16th Artillery, cited; da GO 36, 1970)
- Cited in the Order of the day of the Belgian Army for action at St. Vith (16th armored Field artillery Battalion cited; da GO 43, 1950)

== Heraldry ==
=== Distinctive unit insignia ===
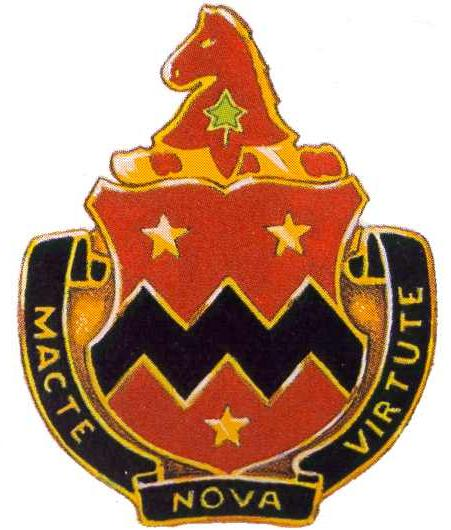

- Description/Blazon: A gold color metal and enamel device 1 5/16 inches (3.3 cm) in height consisting of the shield, crest and motto of the coat of arms.
- Symbolism: The field is red for artillery. The dancetté fess is for the hills and mountains with which the regiment's history is connected (Kings Mountain, North Carolina; Hill 304 near Verdun; Hill 295 north of Septsarges, France; the Landskrone, Rhineland; and Mount Rainier, Washington). The black is for the battle losses. The three stars are for the three major operations of World War I in which the regiment took part. The horse's head indicates a mounted regiment and the ivy leaf is taken from the 4th Division shoulder sleeve insignia.
- Background: The distinctive unit insignia was originally approved for the 16th Field Artillery Regiment on 21 February 1923. It was redesignated for the 16th Field Artillery Battalion on 12 May 1941. It was redesignated for the 16th Armored Field Artillery Battalion on 2 February 1951. It was redesignated for the 16th Artillery Regiment on 28 July 1958. The insignia was redesignated for the 16th Field Artillery Regiment on 6 December 1971.

=== Coat of arms ===

- Description/Blazon

Shield: Gules a fess dancetté Or voided Sable, between three mullets, two and one, of the second. Crest: On a wreath of the colors Or and Gules, a horse's head erased Gules, charged with an ivy leaf Proper (for the 4th Division). Motto: MACTE NOVA VIRTUTE (Go Forth With New Strength).

- Symbolism

Shield: The field is red for artillery. The dancetté fess is for the hills and mountains with which the regiment's history is connected (King's Mountains, North Carolina; Hill 304 near Verdun; Hill 295 north of Septsarges, France; the Landskrone, Rhineland; and Mt. Rainier, Washington). The black is for the battle losses. The three stars are for the three major operations of World War I in which the regiment took part. Crest: The horse's head indicates a mounted regiment and the ivy leaf is taken from the 4th Division shoulder sleeve insignia.

- Background: The coat of arms was originally approved for the 16th Field Artillery Regiment on 11 February 1921. It was redesignated for the 16th Field Artillery Battalion on 12 May 1941. It was redesignated for the 16th Armored Field Artillery Battalion on 2 February 1951. It was redesignated for the 16th Artillery Regiment on 28 July 1958. The insignia was redesignated for the 16th Field Artillery Regiment on 6 December 1971.

== See also ==
- Field Artillery Branch (United States)
- U.S. Army Coast Artillery Corps
