= 204th Brigade Support Battalion =

204th Support Battalion
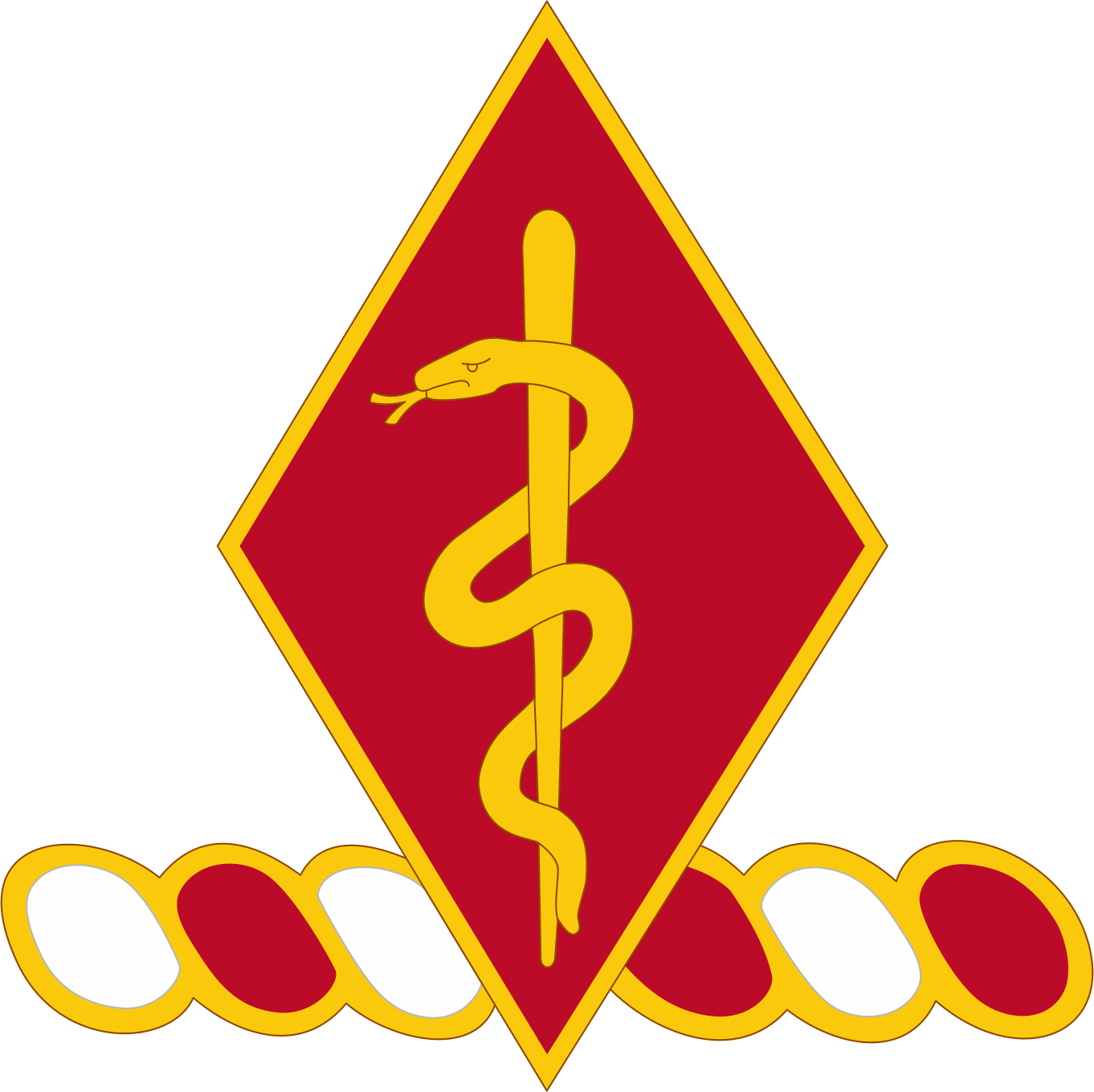
- Distinctive unit insignia
- Country: United States
- Branch: United States Army
- Size: Battalion
- Decorations: Valorous Unit Award (2003–2004); Valorous Unit Award (2011–2012); Meritorious Unit Commendation (2005–2006); Meritorious Unit Commendation (2008–2009)

The mission of the 204th Brigade Support Battalion, "Rough Riders," is to, on order, deploy and execute responsive Combat Service Support and Combat Health Support in support of the 2nd Brigade Combat Team, 4th Infantry Division's objectives. ("Rough Riders") was originally constituted as the 5th Sanitary Trains on 10 November 1917 at Camp Logan, Texas. During World War I, the unit fought in numerous battles and campaigns including the Battle of Saint-Mihiel, Meuse-Argonne Offensive, and the Battle of Champagne, at Lorraine. After the First World War, the unit was reorganized and re-designated on 29 January 1921 as the 5th Medical Regiment. The 5th Medical Regiment was inactivated in August 1921 at Camp Jackson, South Carolina.

On 29 March 1940, the 5th Medical Regiment was re-designated as the 5th Medical Battalion. The 5th Medical Battalion was assigned on 1 July 1940 to the 4th Division, the "Ivy Division" (later re-designated as the 4th Infantry Division) and activated at Fort Benning, Georgia as the 4th Medical Battalion. The unit was reorganized and re-designated on 7 July 1942 as the 4th Medical Battalion, Motorized and then again on 4 August 1943 as the 4th Medical Battalion. During World War II, the battalion fought on the beaches of Normandy and Northern France, through the Rhineland, into Ardenne-Alsace and Central Europe. The 4th Medical Battalion was inactivated following the end of the Second World War on 21 February 1946, at Camp Butner, North Carolina .

The unit was again reactivated on 6 July 1948, at Fort Ord, California. The 4th Medical Battalion saw action in Vietnam during Counteroffensives Phase II through VII, the Tet Counteroffensives of 1968 and 1969, and the Sanctuary Counteroffensive. The battalion was inactivated on 15 December 1969 at Fort Carson, Colorado after returning from Vietnam.

On 1 May 1987, the unit was converted and re-designated as the 204th Forward Support Battalion and activated at Fort Carson, Colorado, as an element of the 4th Infantry Division. The unit served in the Division Support Command (DISCOM) of the 4th Infantry Division. The unit was inactivated on 15 December 1989 at Fort Carson, Colorado. The 204th Forward Support Battalion was reactivated on 15 December 1995 at Fort Hood, Texas.

On 16 December 2004, as part of the Army's modular transformation, the 204th Forward Support Battalion was inactivated, and reorganized and re-designated as the 204th Brigade Support Battalion. As part of the modular transformation, assets previously held at division level, but habitually attached a division's brigades during operations were made organic to those brigades. The 204th Brigade Support Battalion was relieved from assignment to the 4th Infantry Division and reactivated assigned to the reorganized and re-designated 2nd Brigade Combat Team, 4th Infantry Division. As of 1 January 2006, the 204th Brigade Support Battalion, an element of the 2nd Brigade Combat Team, 4th Infantry Division was deployed to Forward Operating Base Duke, located in Najaf, Iraq, in support of Operation Iraqi Freedom. This was the second deployment of the 204th Support Battalion, fulfilling the mission of maintaining war fighting readiness while providing combat service support to the 2nd Brigade Combat Team, 4th Infantry Division. Following its return from Iraq in late 2006, the 204th Brigade Support Battalion moved from Fort Hood, Texas to Fort Carson, Colorado along with the rest of the 2nd Brigade Combat Team, 4th Infantry Division.

== Current Organization ==
Battalion Elements

- Headquarters Company "Hellfire"
- Alpha Company – "Assassin“ (Distro Company)
- Bravo Company – "Black Knight“ (Maintenance Company)
- Charlie Company – "Crusader“ (Medical Company)

Forward Support Companies The forward support companies are companies of the 204th BSB which are semi permanently attached to other battalions in the brigade.

- Delta Company – 1/10 CAV
- Echo Company – 2–8 Infantry Regiment
- Fox Company – 1–67 Armor Regiment
- Golf Company – 3–16 Field Artillery
