= Battle of An Bao =

Part of the Vietnam War (1968)

- Part of the Vietnam War
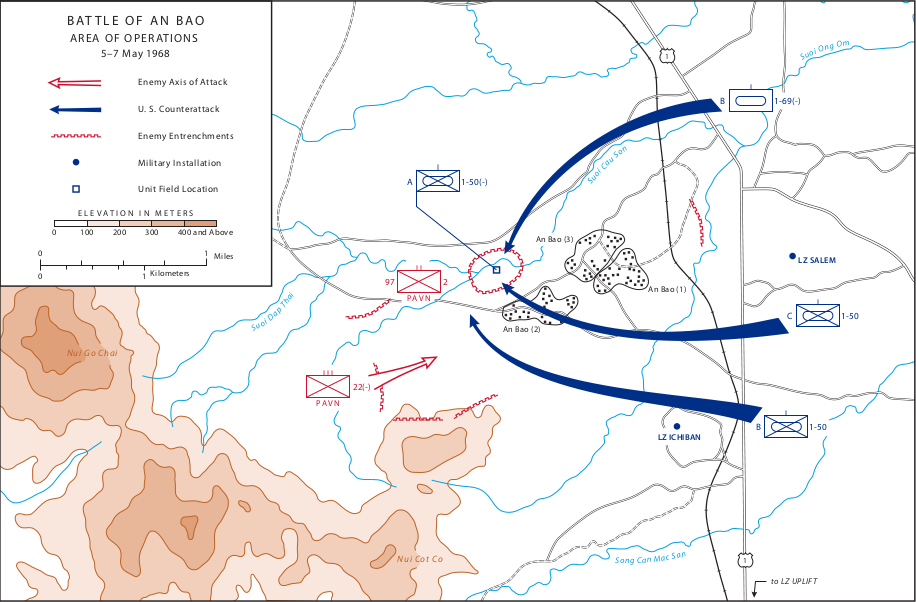
- Battle of An Bao, May 1968
Date	5–6 May 1968
Location	Bình Định Province, South Vietnam

Belligerents
United States	North Vietnam

Commanders and leaders
LTC Cheney L. Bertholf Jr.	COL Lư Giang

Units involved
1st Battalion, 50th Infantry Regiment (Mechanized); Company B, 1st Battalion, 69th Armored	97th Battalion, 2nd Regiment; 7th and 9th Battalions, 22nd Regiment

Casualties and losses
18 killed	U.S. body count: 117 killed 70 weapons recovered

The Battle of An Bao took place from 5 to 6 May 1968 in Bình Định province during the Vietnam War when elements of the People's Army of Vietnam (PAVN) 3rd Division ambushed a unit of the 1st Battalion, 50th Infantry Regiment (Mechanized).

== Background ==
As part of the May Offensive, PAVN Major General Chu Huy Mân, commander of Military Region 5 ordered the 3rd Division to cripple the 1/50th Infantry, which provide an armored fist for the 173rd Airborne Brigade in Bình Định Province. Without necessary supplies for an extended campaign, the 3rd Division chose to execute a few of well-prepared ambushes targeting the 1/50th Infantry at Landing Zone Uplift, 8 kilometres (5.0 mi) north of the town of Phù Mỹ.

== Battle ==
On the morning of 5 May, the 3rd Division attacked Landing Zone Salem (14.288°N 109.085°E), 5 kilometres (3.1 mi) north of LZ Uplift, and Landing Zone Ollie (14.325°N 109.064°E) a further 3 kilometres (1.9 mi) north. The commander of the 1/50th Infantry, Lt. Col. John B. Carter ordered two platoons from Company A, 1/50th Infantry to the village of An Bao, 2 kilometres (1.2 mi) west of LZ Salem, where signal intercepts indicated a PAVN regimental headquarters might be located.

At 08:00, the force of nine M113s and 55 men under Lieutenant Dennis E. Hinton left LZ Uplift and headed north on Highway 1. By 10:00, the force had turned west off Highway 1 towards An Bao and were crossing some dry rice paddies in a clearing when they saw a group of approximately 15 PAVN run into the tree line. The M113s moved into line abreast and fired their machine guns into the tree line, but received no return fire. After searching the area, the force formed a defensive perimeter and the men ate lunch. As they were preparing to move out, the position was hit by rocket-propelled grenades (RPG) and recoilless rifle fire, which disabled the command and medical vehicles. Mortar rounds and machine gun fire then began to hit the U.S. position. Realizing that they were surrounded, Lt. Hinton radioed for support.

The PAVN forces comprising the 97th Battalion, 2nd Regiment, and the 7th and 9th Battalions, 22nd Regiment began closing in on the U.S. position. Two M113s attacked on the PAVN positions, but both were soon disabled by RPGs. An M132 armored flamethrower was also hit, and its fuel tanks caught fire. The remaining four M113s and some soldiers on foot retreated through their entry point into the clearing and headed back to Highway 1 leaving behind 15 men in a small perimeter a few 100 metres (330 ft) northwest of the disabled M113s.

On learning of the ambush, Bertholf ordered Company C of 1/50th Infantry under Captain Jay Copley, and Company B of 1/69th Armored with its seven M48s under Captain Timothy J. Grogan, which were located at LZ Uplift for performing maintenance, to go to assist Company A. The 1/69th tanks overshot the turnoff to An Bao by 1.5 kilometres (0.93 mi) and when they did turn west off of Highway 1, one of the tanks got stuck in the mud, leaving one tank to assist in retrieving the wedged tank. The remaining five M48s proceeded towards An Bao. Company C reached the ambush site first and entered the clearing as the PAVN were closing in on the 15 men from Company A, the M113s moved in to form an armored perimeter but were soon hit by intense fire that killed and wounded several of the men of Company C. The five M48s then arrived in the clearing and the U.S. forces were able to withdraw and regroup while air and artillery strikes hit the clearing and surrounding forest.

At 17:00, a platoon of tanks from Landing Zone English and Company B, 1/50th Infantry, joined the force and the combined force re-entered the clearing to engage the PAVN. Despite the preceding hours of air and artillery strikes, heavy fire again met the U.S. force. The previously dry paddy fields were now filling up with water from a dike that had been deliberately opened or destroyed in the bombing, and the ground was now too muddy to be crossed. The Americans withdrew to establish a night defense position while air and artillery strikes continued.

At 03:30 on 6 May, the PAVN attacked the northwest of the U.S. perimeter with over a hundred soldiers advancing behind a hail of mortar and RPG fire that detonated an ammunition stockpile, injuring several Americans. The assault was beaten back and the PAVN withdrew at 05:00, dragging away their dead and wounded. Three Americans had been killed in the attack.

Later that morning, the Americans advanced again on the tree line, but the PAVN had left the battlefield, and they found only empty bunkers and fighting positions.

== Aftermath ==
The battle was claimed as a U.S. victory with MACV claiming 117 PAVN were killed with 70 weapons recovered, with 18 Americans killed.

The PAVN also claimed victory, destroying 32 U.S. armored vehicles, defeating three mechanized companies and two infantry companies, but the U.S. reported only five APCs were destroyed.
