= Battle of South Saigon =

Part of the Vietnam War (1968)

- Part of May Offensive of the Vietnam War
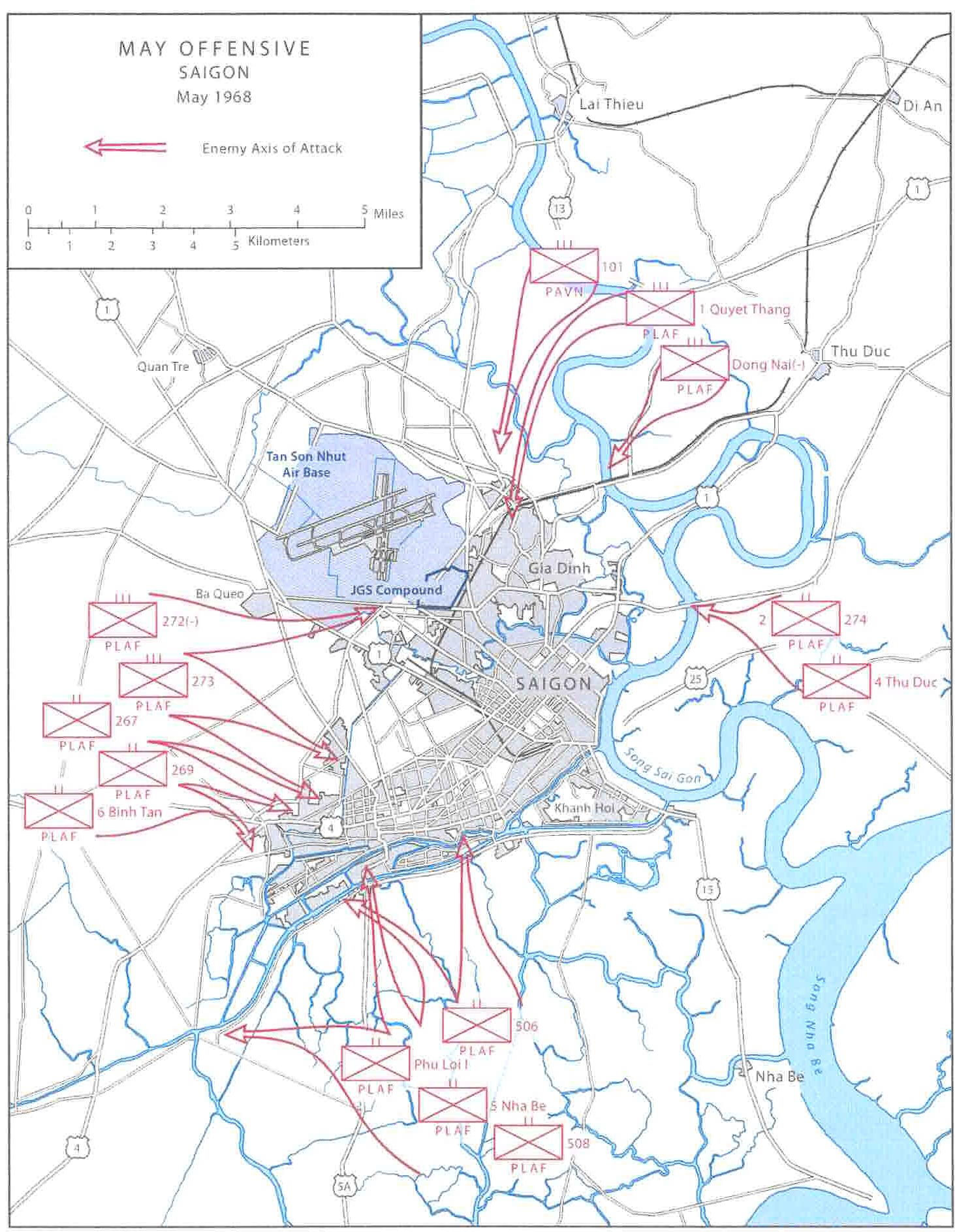
- Map of the battle
Date	7–12 May 1968
Location	District 8, Saigon, South Vietnam 10.747°N 106.68°E
Result	Allied military victory

Belligerents
United States; South Vietnam	Viet Cong

Commanders and leaders
LTC Eric F. Antila; LTC Anthony P. DeLuca; LTC Joseph H. Schmalhorst; LTC John B. Tower	Huỳnh Công Thân

Units involved
9th Infantry Division: 5th Battalion, 60th Inf.; 3rd Battalion, 39th Inf.; 6th Battalion, 31st Inf.; 2nd Battalion, 47th Inf.; 1st Cavalry Regiment: Troop B, 7th Squadron	Sub-Region 3: 506th Battalion; 508th Battalion; Phu Loi I Battalion; 5th Nha Be Battalion

Casualties and losses
(United States) 27 killed	US body count 200–250 killed

The Battle of South Saigon (also known as the Battle of the Y Bridge) took place from 7–12 May 1968 during the Vietcong (VC) May Offensive of the Vietnam War. Four VC battalions attempted to advance over a series of bridges into south Saigon, but were blocked by US Army units and eventually forced to retreat with heavy losses.

== Background ==
When the Army of the Republic of Vietnam (ARVN) 33rd and 38th Ranger Battalions left south Saigon on the morning of 6 May to block the VC thrust toward Chợ Lớn in west Saigon, II Field Force, Vietnam commander General John H. Hay arranged for US troops to fill the gap until ARVN units could be found to do the job. What was intended as a temporary expedient turned into one of the most vicious and sustained battles the Americans would experience in the Saigon area at any point in the war.

Under orders from Hay, the 9th Infantry Division sent Company C, 5th Battalion, 60th Infantry Regiment, up Highway 4 and then east along Route 232, a two-lane road that ran along the southern edge of the city. The road passed through the Eighth District, a Catholic working-class slum that in recent years had sprouted along the southern edge of the Doi Canal. The mechanized unit, commanded by Captain Edmund Scarborough, parked its M113 armored personnel carriers (APCs) at two of the three bridges that spanned the Doi Canal. Scarborough set up his headquarters near the Tung Thien Vuong Bridge (10.741°N 106.656°E), situated approximately three kilometers due south of the Phú Thọ racetrack. It was also known as the 5A Bridge because Route 5A entered the city at that point. Four kilometers to the east was the Y Bridge (10.75°N 106.683°E), so named because it resembled that letter when viewed from above. Scarborough sent his 1st Platoon to guard that span. Another four kilometers beyond that lay the Tân Thuận Bridge (10.755°N 106.72°E), but for the moment that remained under the protection of South Vietnamese Marines.

Unknown to the US forces, four VC battalions under the control of Sub-Region 3 were headed their way. The goal of the 506th and 508th Battalions, the Phu Loi I Battalion and the 5th Nha Be Battalion was to seize the three bridges in the Eighth District and enter the city to attack the National Police headquarters and other targets. The Phu Loi I Battalion aimed to take the 5A Bridge, while the 506th Battalion headed for the Y Bridge. The 5th Nha Be Battalion, only 110 men strong, advanced on their right flank toward the Tân Thuận Bridge. Coming up behind the 506th Battalion was the 508th Battalion, a below-strength outfit with just 173 men, which had orders to preserve a line of communications into the countryside. Using the many streams and canals that crisscrossed southern Gia Định Province, the four battalions travelled by foot and sampan right up to the edge of the city without being detected.

== Battle ==
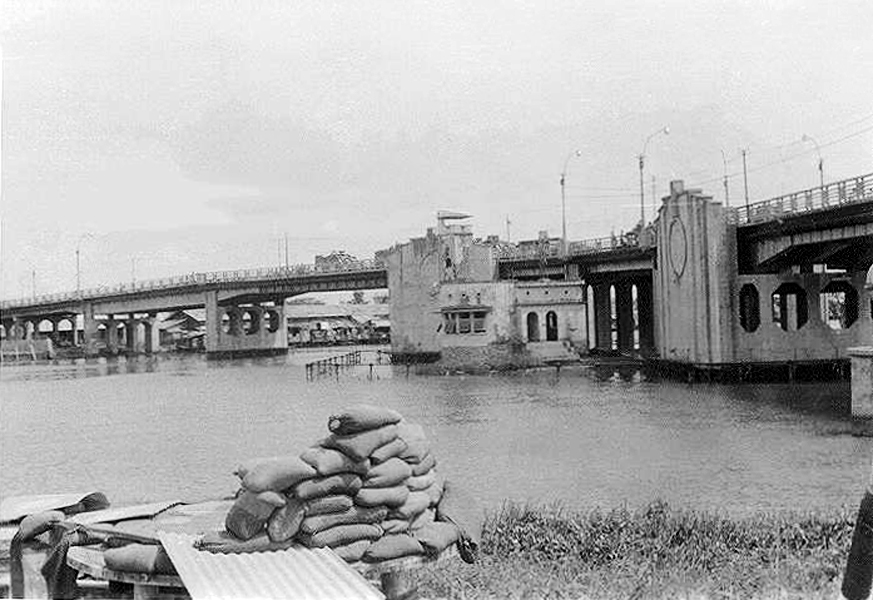
The Y Bridge in 1968

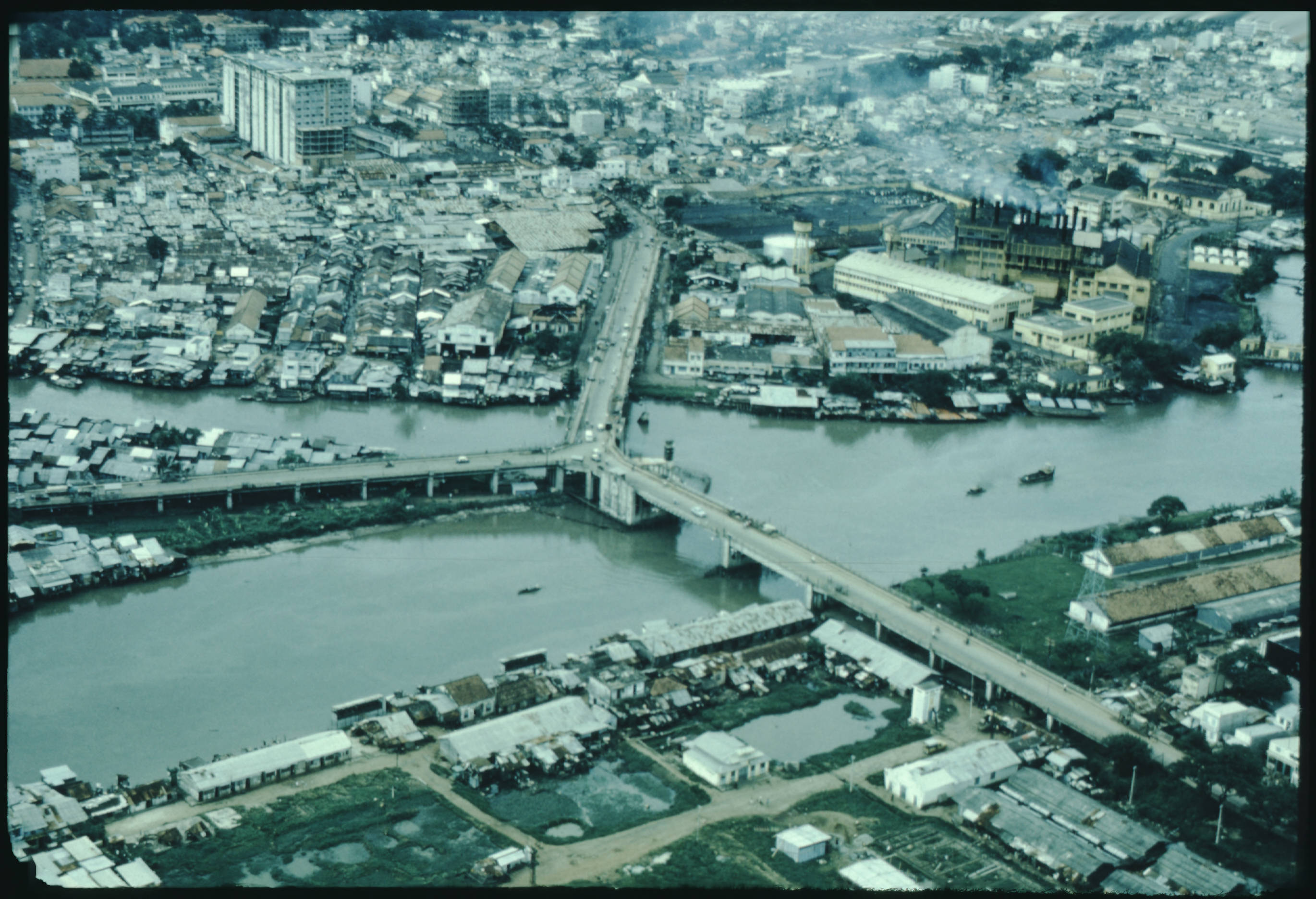
Aerial view of the Y Bridge in October 1969

The VC began their assault at 03:45 on 7 May. Soldiers from the 506th Battalion opened fire on the APCs that were standing guard on the Y Bridge. A company from the Phu Loi I Battalion, having already crossed the canal on sampans without being detected, also opened fire from the north bank. The 1st Platoon fired back with their own weapons as AK-47 bullets chipped away the bridgework and pinged off their vehicles. The troops hoped that the intimidating firepower of their .50-caliber and M60 machine guns would keep the VC at a safe distance. Several Rocket-propelled grenades (RPGs) whooshed out of the darkness, but the rounds slammed into the bridge instead of the vehicles.

At 05:30, the 506th Battalion shifted its focus from the 1st Platoon to a police station located just south of the Y Bridge. The outgunned policemen were on the verge of abandoning the building when several helicopter gunships appeared overhead and their guns forced the VC to seek cover. Scarborough immediately sent his 2nd Platoon racing from the 5A Bridge to the police station. An estimated company of VC was getting ready to attack the station from a nearby rice paddy when the four APCs rolled into the compound. Their machine guns forced the VC to stay put behind a series of dikes. The fight remained hotly contested until an AH-1 Cobra gunship strafed the length of the dike, putting the VC to flight.

While soldiers from the 506th Battalion continued to snipe at the 1st and 2nd Platoons, the main VC threat shifted to the hamlet of Cầu Mật (10.747°N 106.68°E), which sat on the canal road a few hundred meters to the west. Now occupied by the Phu Loi I Battalion, the hamlet became Scarborough’s most pressing problem. As long as the VC controlled Cầu Mật, Company C would be effectively cut in two. He radioed the commander of the 5/60th Infantry, Lieutenant colonel Eric F. Antila, for instructions. Antila told him to keep his men where they were until more help arrived. Two platoons from Company A were already on their way from Bến Lức District in northeastern Long An Province. Antila also told Scarborough that helicopter gunships from Troop B, 7th Squadron, 1st Cavalry Regiment, would arrive shortly. Nine APCs and 58 soldiers from Company A, 5/60th Infantry, arrived in the Eighth District a few hours later.

After ARVN troops established a blocking position on the east side of Cầu Mật, the US soldiers began working their way among the ramshackle buildings and narrow streets on the western side of Cầu Mật. Many already knew something about urban combat; Company A had fought in the Tet Offensive battle of Cholon and Phu Tho Racetrack. The advance was slow and methodical. In the confusing warren of houses and alleyways, there was always a risk that the VC could sneak through the cordon and double back for a surprise rear attack. The Americans also had to be discriminating in their use of fire because the hamlet was still full of civilians. Air and artillery strikes were ruled out for the same reason. As a result, most of the fighting took place at close range with small arms, grenades, and machine guns. By evening, Company A had killed several dozen VC while losing two killed and 47 wounded. Much of Cầu Mật still remained in VC hands.

As the battle for Cầu Mật heated up, Hay directed Major general George C. O'Connor to commit more men from his 9th Infantry Division. On the afternoon of 7 May, a composite company of the 3rd Battalion, 39th Infantry Regiment and part of the 6th Battalion, 31st Infantry Regiment, landed onto a dry rice paddy some 1.5 km south of Cầu Mật. Antila assumed operational control over those units. Antila now had the equivalent of six companies at his disposal, but many more would be needed to clear the Eighth District.

On the morning of 8 May, the infantry company from the 3/39th Infantry, began to sweep Cầu Mật from south to north. The scout platoon from the 2nd Battalion, 47th Infantry Regiment, joined the action a short time later, adding some extra punch with its APCs and .50-caliber machine guns. The sweep was a harrowing affair. VC spider holes and makeshift bunkers seemed to be everywhere and many houses contained snipers. From those darkened interiors they were often invisible to the US soldiers moving around on the streets outside. Progress was frustratingly slow.

The VC’s tenacity convinced South Vietnamese authorities to permit limited air and artillery strikes. The commander of the 3/39th Infantry, Lt. Col. Anthony P. DeLuca, directed those strikes from his circling command helicopter. South Vietnamese officials did their best to move the residents of Cầu Mật out of harm’s way. In some cases, frightened civilians ran straight through ongoing firefights in a desperate attempt to reach safety.

Early on 9 May, the 506th Battalion resumed its attack on the Y Bridge. At around 02:30, the VC began mortaring a pagoda where DeLuca had set up his command post. Things quieted down after thirty minutes, but an RPG broke the calm at 04:00 when it slammed into the pagoda. That signalled the start of another mortar barrage against DeLuca’s command post. As shells exploded outside, the colonel began to get reports of VC activity up and down the length of the Eighth District. No major assault developed, but the shooting continued at a steady pace even after the sun rose. In hindsight, the sudden burst of activity was probably designed to draw attention away from the western suburbs where the Cuu Long II Regiment and the 9th Division were trying to withdraw from the Battle of West Saigon.

At daybreak, Antila sent his 5/60th Infantry, on another sweep through Cầu Mật to clear out the Phu Loi I Battalion. He also dispatched Company B, 6/31st Infantry to assist DeLuca who was strongly engaged with the 506th Battalion around the Y Bridge. As the fighting spread north of the canal, thousands of residents streamed south across the Y Bridge. ARVN troops tried to maintain order but some people were pushed into the coils of barbed wire that lined the bridge. Others were trampled by panicked neighbors. At least 100 civilians either died or became injured while crossing the bridge. Other residents died in the fighting as they ran through the city streets. In the end, most of the terrified civilians made it across the bridge. As their numbers dwindled, the allies began to scour the neighborhood with a more liberal application of firepower.

The fighting on 9 May spread well beyond Cầu Mật and the Y Bridge area. When Company B, 6/31st Infantry, arrived at DeLuca’s command post early in the afternoon, he ordered them to assist a police facility that had come under attack. The station was located some 800 meters to the southeast (10.75°N 106.69°E), situated next to the Ong Lon Canal that fed north into the Doi Canal. The VC who had attacked the station was likely the 508th Battalion, which was trying to keep the tributary open for use as a supply and escape route. When Company B’s APCs rolled up to the embattled station, the VC initially stood their ground, but melted back into the surrounding countryside an hour later when Company A, 3/39th Infantry, joined the fight.

Around that same time, another fight was developing in the nearby hamlet of Xom Ong Doi (10.751°N 106.702°E), two kilometers east of the Y Bridge and the same distance west of the Tân Thuận Bridge. A company from the South Vietnamese 1st Marine Battalion was locked in battle with the 5th Nha Be Battalion, which had been trying to reach the bridge for the past several days. The Marines had enough men to protect the bridge, but not enough to clear Xom Ong Doi, so the 9th Infantry Division extended its zone of responsibility to cover the eastern part of the Eighth District. It gave the mission of securing Xom Ong Doi to the 6/31st Infantry, commanded by Lt. Col. Joseph H. Schmalhorst, which was currently patrolling the region south of the 5A Bridge. It would be joined by the 2/47th Infantry, commanded by Lt. Col. John B. Tower, a mechanized unit stationed at the 3rd Brigade’s Bearcat Base.

Company A and the greater part of Company C, 6th/31st Infantry, landed just east of Xom Ong Doi shortly after noon. The pilots flew fast and low to evade the heavy ground fire that greeted the incoming helicopters. Once the infantrymen got their feet on the ground, they fanned out toward the southern side of the hamlet. Vietnamese marines set up a blocking position to the west. The advancing Americans came under small arms fire but it was not particularly heavy; the 100 or so living members of the 5th Nha Be Battalion were likely stretched thin across the hamlet. The men from the 6/31st Infantry, killed several snipers on the southern edge of Xom Ong Doi and then entered the hamlet at 15:00. About that same time, the 2/47th Infantry, minus Company A, completed its journey from Bearcat to the Eighth District. The mechanized unit sped through downtown Saigon and then crossed over the Tân Thuận Bridge before pulling up along the north side of Xom Ong Doi. The arrival of Tower’s men meant that the 5th Nha Be Battalion was now boxed in on three sides. For all intents and purposes, it was a complete encirclement because helicopter gunships from the 7th Squadron, 1st Cavalry, watched the open fields to the east.

Desperately outnumbered but full of resolve, the 5th Nha Be Battalion would not go down without a fight. A storm of fire raked Company B, 2/47th Infantry, the lead unit in Tower’s force, as it came rumbling down the canal road. Several soldiers fell dead or wounded during the opening salvo. Company B responded with a fusillade of machine gun and small arms fire that tore into the flimsy buildings that lined the road. From his helicopter buzzing overhead Tower ordered Company C, which was at the rear of the column and had not yet entered Xom Ong Doi, to turn south for a short distance before turning west again to bring flanking fire onto the VC. As the company performed the maneuver, several of the vehicles bogged down in the marshland that bordered the hamlet. The rest backed out to the firm ground on the road. The immobilized vehicles provided supporting fire, while the remainder of the unit began a house-to-house sweep through the hamlet. This clearing operation was a brutal affair. Nearly all of the residents had fled Xom Ong Doi, so it turned into a virtual free-fire zone. The Allies blasted their way through the hamlet, while helicopter gunships sent waves of rockets crashing into the tightly packed buildings. US fighter-bombers swooped in to demolish whole blocks with 500-pound bombs, Napalm and 20-mm. cannon. The 2/47th Infantry, expended so much ammunition that Tower had to arrange emergency resupply from Bearcat. By evening, hostile fire had almost ceased. When the two US battalions pulled back because of darkness, gunships continued to pound Xom Ong Doi by the flickering light of a hundred or more fires.

The 2/47th Infantry and the 6/31st Infantry encountered no resistance when they entered the hamlet the next morning. The retreating 5th Nha Be Battalion left behind 12 of its dead in the ruins of Xom Ong Doi. The 2/47th Infantry, had lost eight men killed during the battle.

Although the Americans had driven the 5th Nha Be Battalion out of Xom Ong Doi, the 506th and Phu Loi I Battalions still clung to footholds around the Y Bridge and Cầu Mật, respectively. DeLuca decided to tackle Cầu Mật first. On the morning of 10 May, he sent Companies A and B from the 3/39th Infantry, down the canal road to attack the hamlet from the east. Well-hidden snipers brought the column to a halt on the outskirts of Cầu Mật. DeLuca sent in his reconnaissance platoon as well as Company B, 6/31st Infantry, to execute a flanking attack from the southeast. They, too, came under heavy fire and stopped short of Cầu Mật. Despite having abundant gunship and artillery support, DeLuca’s infantry made little progress that day, losing six killed and 40 wounded. Airstrikes, artillery, and gunships pounded the enemy positions through the night as DeLuca’s men readied themselves for another day of gruelling, close-quarter combat. To their relief, the VC began to withdraw on the morning of 10 May. The first sign came when an estimated two VC companies attacked a South Vietnamese Regional/Popular Forces outpost in Xom Tan Liem (10.688°N 106.647°E), a small hamlet on Route 5A five kilometers south of the Doi Canal. The attack indicated that the VC was moving from the Eighth District back into the countryside. Colonel Antila ordered Companies A and C of the 5/60th Infantry, to rescue the besieged government soldiers and trap the VC force.

The two mechanized companies came under heavy fire as they neared Xom Tan Liem. The VC 508th Battalion possessed .51-caliber antiaircraft machine guns, 82-mm. mortars and 75-mm. recoilless rifles. Having stayed well south of Cầu Mật and the Y Bridge, the unit was still relatively fresh. After 30 minutes of fighting that left six Americans dead and over two dozen more wounded, the Americans pulled back to reorganize. A short time later, Schmalhorst landed Companies A and C, 6/31st Infantry, on Route 5A just north of where Companies A and C, 5/60th Infantry, were taking care of their casualties and restocking ammunition. The four companies waited there on the road for several hours while bombs and shells hammered the hamlet. When Schmalhorst’s troops resumed their advance late that afternoon, they faced only sporadic sniper fire as they moved down the highway. When they entered the hamlet, all they found were a few dazed and wounded VC soldiers. According to those prisoners, the 508th Battalion was headed for the deserted village of Đa Phước (10.666°N 106.658°E) two kilometers to the south. Darkness ruled out an immediate pursuit, but Schmalhorst resolved to regain contact at first light.

On the morning of 11 May, the survivors from the Phu Loi I Battalion abandoned Cầu Mật and began moving south. Most slipped away while it was still dark, clinging to the dense foliage that lined rivers and streams as they marched south. One group of 50 soldiers made the mistake of lingering in Cầu Mật until daylight. The early dawn light was enough to reveal their location, and within minutes an artillery strike destroyed the group.

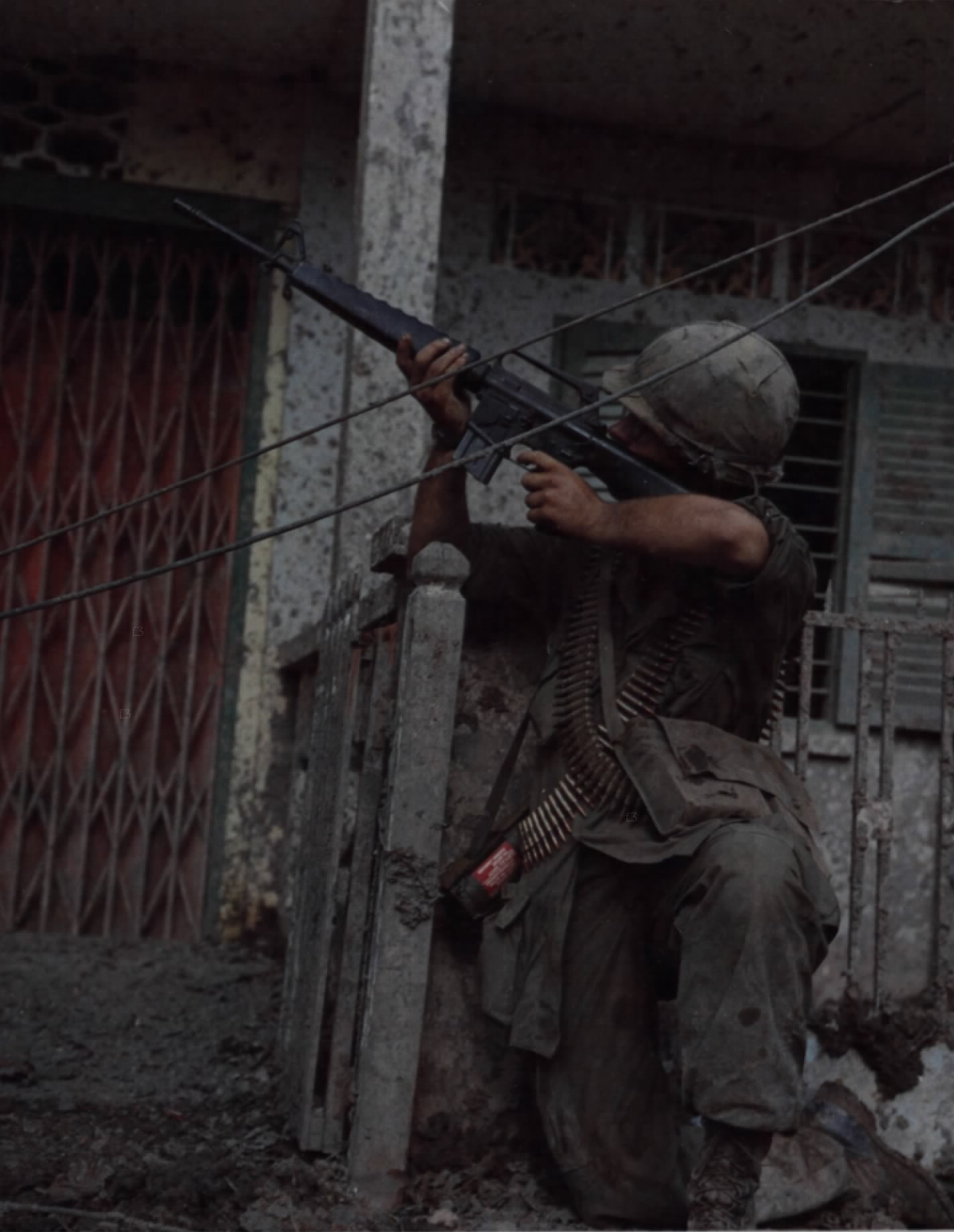
Soldier from Company "B", 2nd Battalion, 47th Infantry searching a house for VC, 13 May 1968

Meanwhile, Schmalhorst resumed his pursuit of the 508th Battalion. He sent Company C, 6/31st Infantry to check the nearby hamlet of Đa Phước where the VC had reportedly gone during the night. When they approached the abandoned community, they came under heavy fire from VC troops who were dug in along the bank of a stream. The Americans quickly realized this was no mere rear guard; the VC was throwing everything he had into the fight. RPGs, heavy machine-gun fire, and mortar shells flew at Company C. The volume of fire hardly diminished even when precise air and artillery strikes began to explode among the VC positions. Schmalhorst inserted by helicopter Company D, 6/31st Infantry, fresh from the battalion base camp, onto the far side of Đa Phước. When it advanced toward the stream to hit the VC from behind, a contingent from the 508th Battalion turned their weapons around and prevented the trap from closing. The firefight continued well into the evening as air strikes and artillery shells lit up the sky. In the early hours of 12 May, the 508th Battalion broke contact and continued its retreat south. Companies C and D lost a total of two dead and 20 wounded in the battle for Đa Phước.

The VC completed their evacuation of the Eighth District on 12 May. A few stragglers fell to the 3/39th Infantry and the 2/47th Infantry, as they swept through the ramshackle buildings and rice fields from Cầu Mật to the Y Bridge. Others died from air and artillery strikes that chased the VC as they marched south.

== Aftermath ==
The cost of the battle, especially to the Eighth District, had been high. Much of Cầu Mật and Xom Ong Doi lay in ruins. At least 8,000 homes had been destroyed in the fighting and over a dozen square blocks of the city were a flattened wasteland. The 9th Division lost 27 killed in the five-day fight.

The cost of the battle for the VC was difficult to calculate. The 9th Infantry Division recorded a body count of 852 VC killed, but that figure is far too high considering that less than 1,000 VC soldiers were involved in the battle. A more likely body count is probably 200 to 250 killed in addition to a somewhat higher number of VC who were wounded. It is therefore reasonable to posit a total casualty rate for the four VC battalions somewhere between 50 and 75 percent.
