= Phù Mỹ =

Ward in Gia Lai province, Vietnam

- Ward
- Interactive map of Phù Mỹ
- Coordinates: 14.171861098551911°N 109.04908743306454°E
- Country: Vietnam
- Province: Gia Lai
- Established: 1 July 2025

Area
  - Total: 54.47 km^{2} (21.03 sq mi)

Population (21 October 2026)
  - Total: 28,524
  - Density: 523.7/km^{2} (1,356/sq mi)

Phù Mỹ is a ward of Gia Lai Province, Vietnam.

== Geography ==
Phù Mỹ ward is a ward in the eastern part of Gia Lai province, approximately 60 km north of Quy Nhơn and 170 km east of Pleiku. It is located in the area formerly administered by Phù Mỹ district. The ward borders the following areas:

- To the northeast, Phù Mỹ Đông commune.
- To the east, An Lương commune.
- To the south, Phù Mỹ Nam commune.
- To the west and north, Phù Mỹ Tây commune.

== History ==
On 12 June 2025, the 15th National Assembly adopted Resolution No. 202/2025/QH15 on the reorganization of provincial-level administrative divisions. Under the resolution, the entire natural area and population of Gia Lai province and Bình Định province were merged to form a new province named Gia Lai.

On 16 June 2025, the Standing Committee of the National Assembly adopted Resolution No. 1664/NQ-UBTVQH15 on the reorganization of commune-level administrative divisions in Gia Lai province in 2025. Under the resolution, the entire natural area and population of Phù Mỹ township and the communes of Mỹ Quang and Mỹ Chánh Tây, formerly part of Phù Mỹ district, were merged to form a new commune named Phù Mỹ.

On 21 October 2026, the 13th-term Gia Lai Provincial People's Council adopted Resolution No. 386/NQ-HĐND approving in principle the establishment of Phù Mỹ ward. Phù Mỹ ward was established from Phù Mỹ commune, with an area of 54.47 km² and a population of 28,524.
