= Landing Zone Uplift =

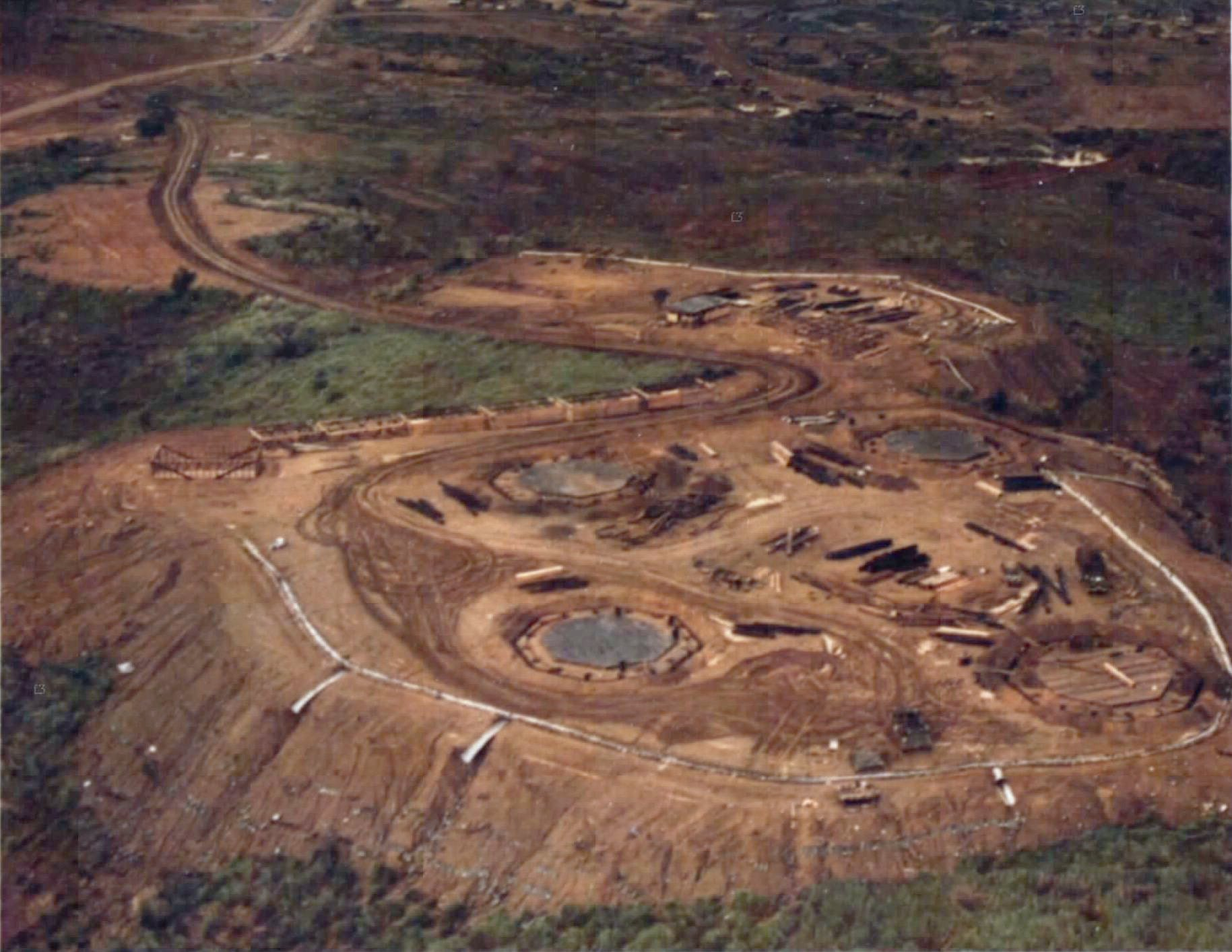
- Landing Zone Uplift in November 1967, showing artillery firing pits under construction for Operation Pershing

Site information
- Type: Army Base

Location
- Coordinates: 14.245°N 109.07°E

Site history
- Built: 1966
- In use: 1966-70
- Battles/wars: Vietnam War

Garrison information
- Occupants: 1st Cavalry Division

Landing Zone Uplift (also known as LZ Uplift or Deo Nhong Pass) is a former U.S. Army base north of Phù Mỹ in Vietnam.

== History ==
The base was established in 1966 by the 1st Cavalry Division on Highway 1, approximately 8 km north of Phu My in Bình Định Province to support Operation Thayer. The base served as the base camp of the 2nd Brigade, 1st Cavalry Division.

Other units stationed at Uplift included:

- 1st Battalion, 50th Infantry
- 1st Battalion, 503rd Infantry
- 1st Battalion, 69th Armor
- 7th Battalion, 13th Artillery
- 7th Battalion, 15th Artillery
- 4th Battalion, 60th Artillery

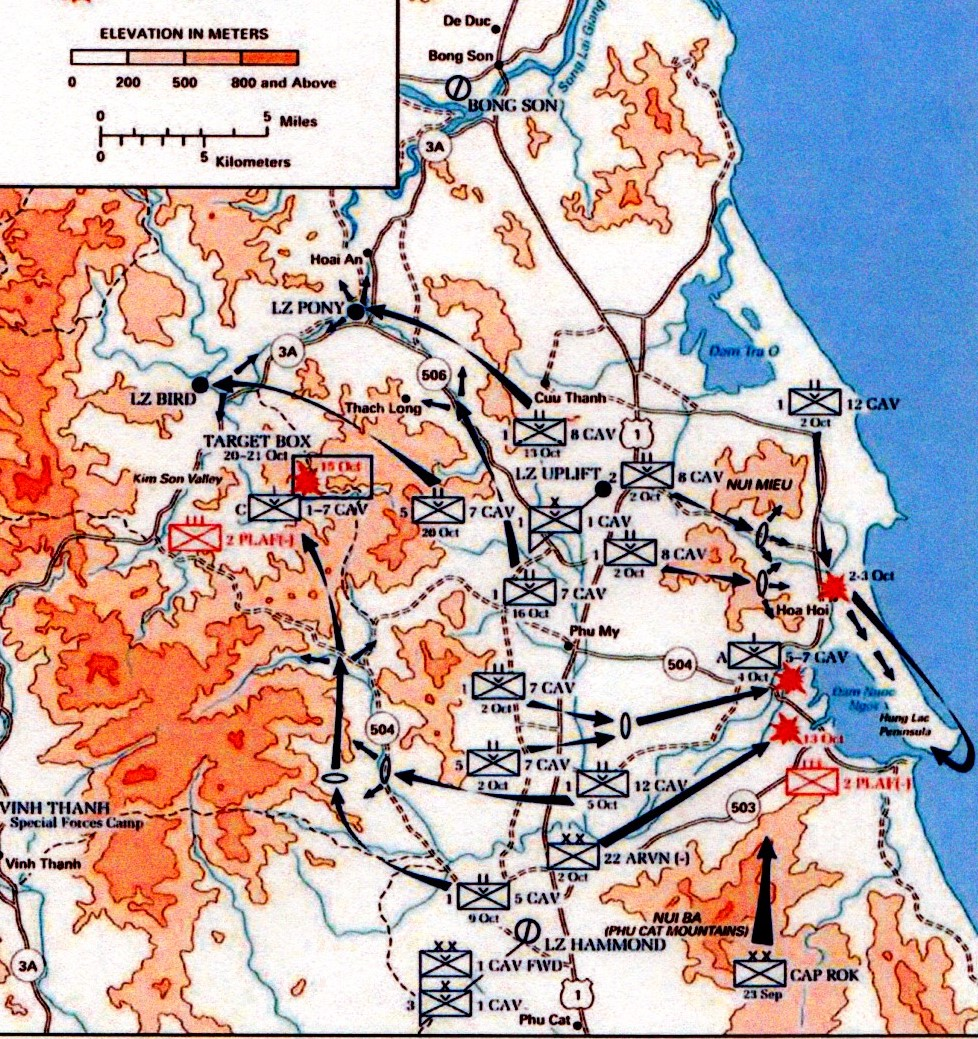
LZ Uplift (center) and surrounding LZs in Operation Irving

On 11 June 1967, a UH-1D helicopter (tail number 63-12958, call sign "Bamboo Viper 47") carrying three crew members and two passengers departed the base for Qui Nhơn Airfield. The helicopter encountered bad weather and the pilot radioed for assistance in determining his position. A search and rescue team was dispatched to lead the helicopter to a safe airfield but could not locate it. The pilot then radioed that he was out of fuel and was going to make a water landing, but the helicopter was not heard from again.

In May 1968, three battalions from the PAVN 3rd Division attacked LZ Salem and Ollie nearby to pull elements of 1/50 Infantry Battalion, and 1/69 Armor Battalion out of LZ Uplift then ambushed them in Battle of An Bao.

On 7 September 1970, following a mortar attack on the base, a patrol was sent out from the base to attack the mortar position and was ambushed with mines destroying several armored vehicles. Staff sergeant Glenn H. English Jr. was killed while trying to rescue another soldier from a burning vehicle when it exploded and was posthumously awarded the Medal of Honor for his actions.

== Current use ==
The base is abandoned and largely turned over to farmland. A large PAVN victory monument is located on part of the former base to commemorate the Battle of Dương Liễu–Nhông Pass.
