= Phù Mỹ district =

Phù Mỹ district Huyện Phù Mỹ
- District
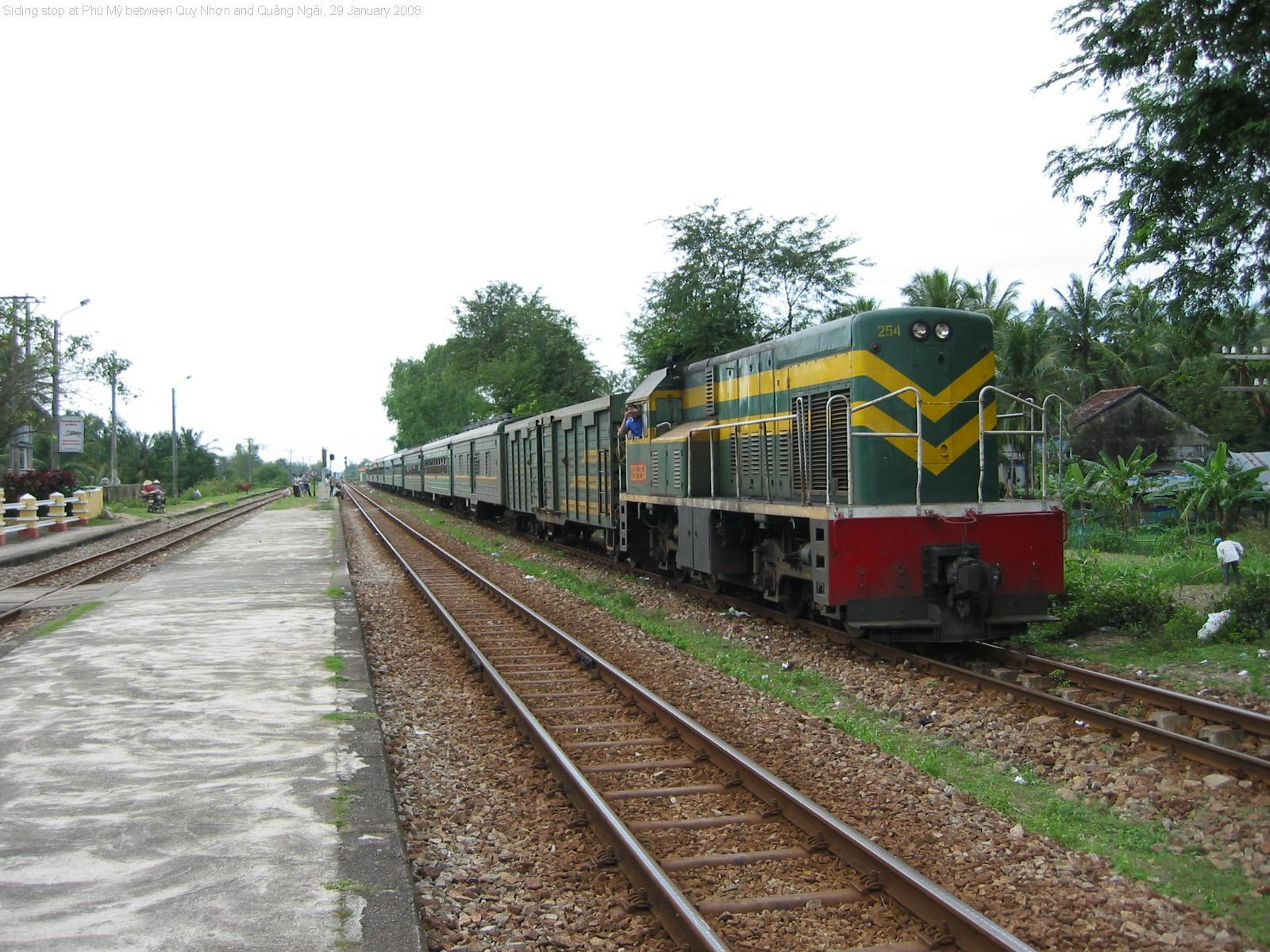
- Northbound rail transport (Vận tải đường sắt) in Phù Mỹ Districy

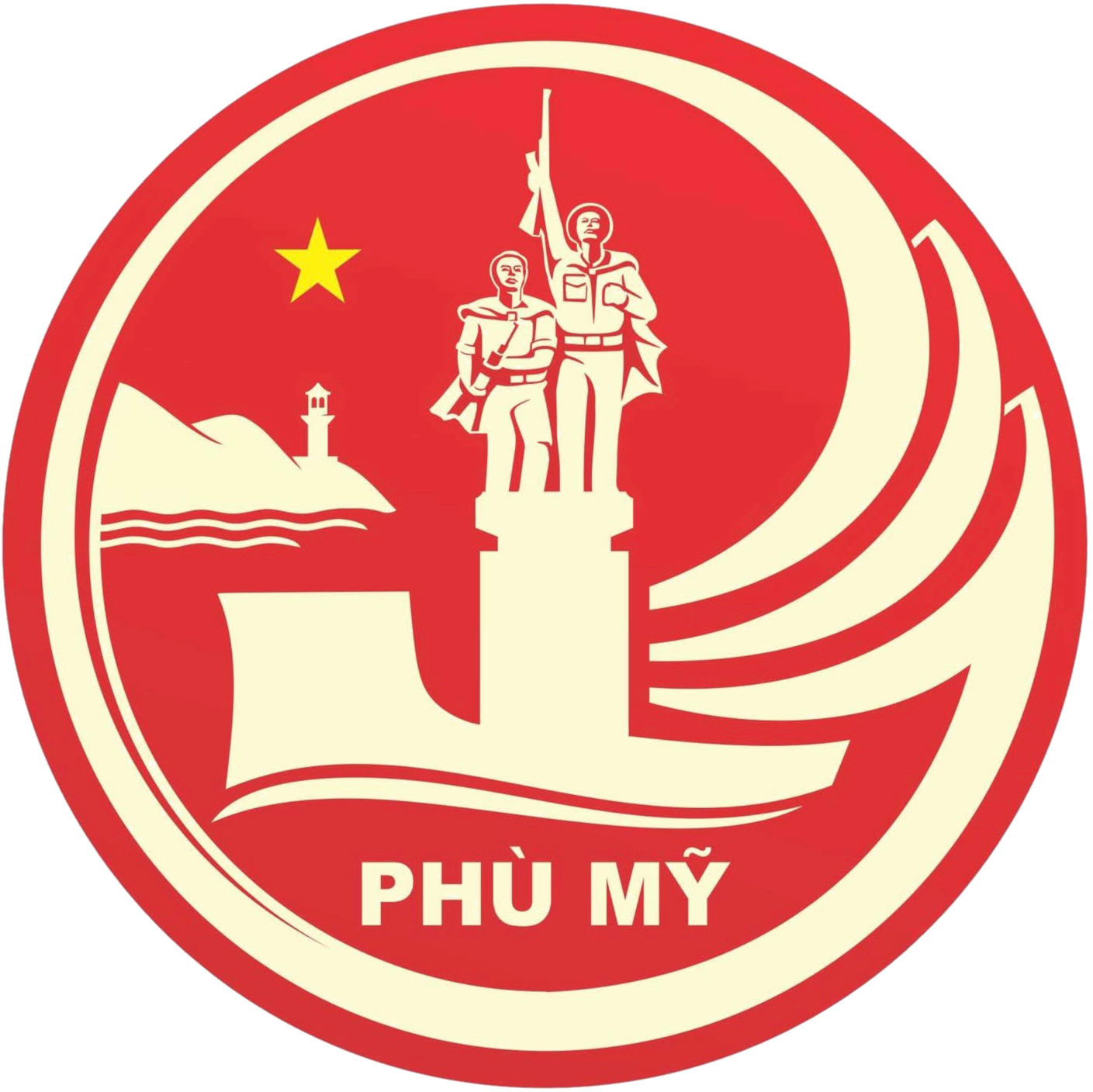
- Seal
- Interactive map of Phù Mỹ district
- Location of in Vietnam
- Coordinates: 14°10′N 109°3′E
- Country: Vietnam
- Region: South Central Coast
- Province: Bình Định
- Capital: Phù Mỹ

Area
  - Total: 560 km^{2} (220 sq mi)

Population (2024)
  - Total: 240,770
  - Density: 430/km^{2} (1,100/sq mi)
- Time zone: UTC+7 (Indochina Time)

Phù Mỹ is a former district (huyện) of Bình Định province in the South Central Coast region of Vietnam. The district capital is Phù Mỹ.

== Geography ==
Phù Mỹ borders Hoài Nhơn and Hoài Ân to the north, Phù Cát to the south, and the South China Sea to the east.

== Transport and economy ==
Most of the communes of Phù Mỹ district lie on National Route 1 that runs through the province from north to south.
