= Kỳ Lừa =

Kỳ Lừa Phường Kỳ Lừa
- Ward
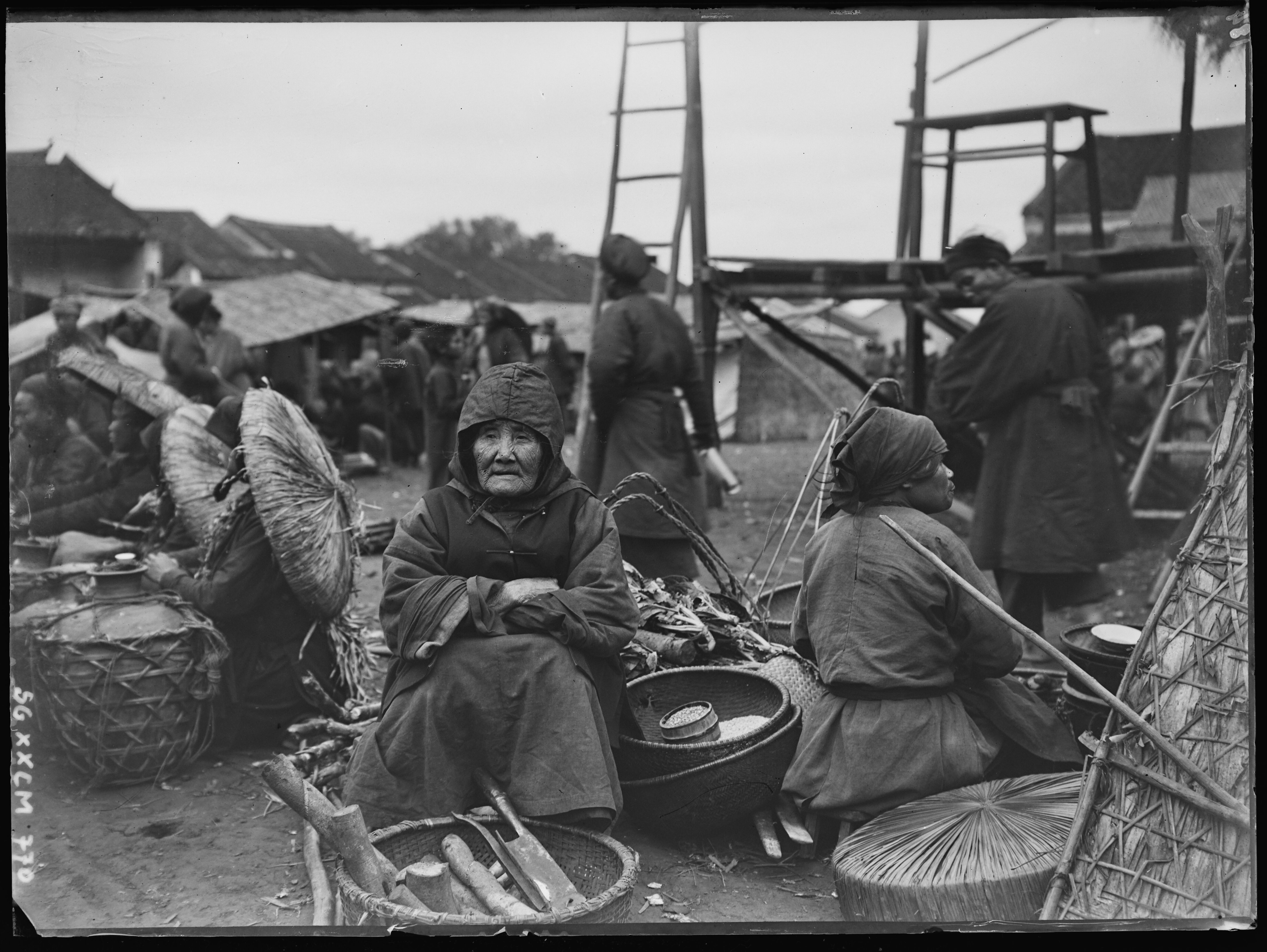
- Kỳ Lừa Market in 1896
- Interactive map of Kỳ Lừa
- Country: Vietnam
- Regions: Northeast
- Province: Lạng Sơn Province
- Established: June 16, 2025

Area
  - Total: 61.70 km^{2} (23.82 sq mi)

Population (2025)
  - Total: 41,624
  - Density: 674.6/km^{2} (1,747/sq mi)
- Time zone: UTC+07:00 (Indochina Time)

Kỳ Lừa is a ward (phường) of Lạng Sơn Province, Vietnam.

== Geography ==
Kỳ Lừa Ward located in central Lạng Sơn Province, and adjacent to:

- Công Sơn Commune and Cao Lộc Commune to the north
- Đông Kinh Ward and Chiến Thắng Commune to the south
- Tam Thanh Ward to the west
- Mẫu Sơn Commune, Lộc Bình Commune and Thống Nhất Commune to the east.

== History ==
On June 16, 2025, the Standing Committee of the National Assembly of Vietnam issued Resolution No. 1672/NQ-UBTVQH15 on the arrangement of commune-level administrative units of Lạng Sơn Province in 2025 (effective from June 16, 2025). Accordingly, the entire land area and population of Hoàng Văn Thụ Ward, Cao Lộc Township and Hợp Thành, Tân Liên, Gia Cát Communes were merged to form a new ward named Kỳ Lừa Ward.
