= Battle of Lạng Sơn =

Battle of Lạng Sơn may refer to:

- Lạng Sơn Campaign in 1885, a French offensive during the Sino-French War
- Battle of Lạng Sơn in September 1940, fought by French forces against the Imperial Japanese Army during the Japanese invasion of French Indochina
- Battle of Lạng Sơn (1979), during the Sino-Vietnamese War
