= Nguyễn Duy Thương =

Vietnamese colonel

Colonel Nguyễn Duy Thương

Military service
- Allegiance: Democratic Republic of Vietnam and later Vietnam
- Branch/service: People's Army of Vietnam
- Rank: Colonel
- Battles/wars: Vietnam War; Battle of Tam Quan; Fall of Saigon; Sino-Vietnamese War; Battle of Lạng Sơn (1979)

Nguyễn Duy Thương was a Colonel in the People's Army of Vietnam (PAVN) active during the Vietnam War and the Sino-Vietnamese War. He led the 22nd Regiment of the PAVN 3rd Infantry Division in the Battle of Tam Quan 1967, then the whole 3rd Infantry Division in the Battle of Lạng Sơn 1979.

== Military career ==
In December 1967, under the regimental commander Nguyễn Sơn Diệp and chief of staff Nguyễn Duy Thương, the 22nd Regiment of the PAVN 3rd Infantry Division escaped from a Search and Destroy operation by a combined force of the United States (US) 1st Brigade, 1st Cavalry Division, the Army of the Republic of Vietnam (ARVN) 40th Infantry Regiment, and two ARVN Marines battalions in the Battle of Tam Quan.

During the 1975 Spring Offensive, Thương was the deputy commander cum chief of staff of the 3rd Infantry Division under the Commander Trần Bá Khuê. Together with the 325th Infantry Division in the PAVN Costal Column, the 3rd Infantry Division defeated an ARVN combined force of the 2nd Infantry Division, the 2nd Airborne Brigade and the 31st Ranger Group in the Battle of Phan Rang lasting from 1 to 16 April 1975. The Fall of Phan Rang on early 16 April, then the Loss of Xuân Lộc on early 21 April destroyed President Thiệu's credibility as South Vietnam leader, and led to his resignation on the night of 21 April.

On 26 April, the 3rd Division split from the Coastal Column to attack toward Phước Tuy province. Till mid-day 28 April, the 12th Regiment had captured Đức Thạnh sub-sector, Đất Đỏ district and Long Điền district along Provincial Route 2; while the 141st Regiment cut through the jungle and captured Bà Rịa town, the Vạn Kiếp National Training Center, then the Cỏ May bridge's northern head, exactly as planned. But the main attack by the 2nd Regiment to Vũng Tàu city was blocked at the Cỏ May river by the broken bridge and the heavy fire of the ARVN 1st Airborne Brigade from the bridge's southern head. The division staff then decided to launch an additional flanking attack by the 12th Regiment passing the Phước Tĩnh strait on fishing vessels. Chief of staff Thương was tasked to directly command this main thrust.

In February 1979, Colonel Thương led the PAVN 3rd Infantry Division and Lạng Sơn local forces fighting against three Chinese People's Liberation Army (PLA) armies in the Battle of Lạng Sơn.
