= Hoàng Đan =

Vietnamese major-general

Major General Hoàng Đan

Personal details
- Born: Hoàng Đan; 1928 Nghi Lộc, Nghệ An, Annam (French protectorate)
- Died: 2003 (aged 74–75)

Military service
- Allegiance: Democratic Republic of Vietnam and later Vietnam
- Branch/service: People's Army of Vietnam
- Rank: Major General
- Unit: 57th Regiment; 304th Division
- Commands: 2nd Corps; 5th Corps
- Battles/wars: First Indochina War; Battle of Điện Biên Phủ; Vietnam War; First Battle of Quảng Trị; Battle of Thượng Đức (1974); Sino-Vietnamese War; Battle of Lạng Sơn (1979)
- Awards: Hero of the People's Armed Forces (posthumously)

Hoàng Đan (1928–2003) was a major-general in the People's Army of Vietnam (PAVN), active during the First Indochina War, Vietnam War and Sino-Vietnamese War. He led PAVN forces in Battle of Thượng Đức (1974) and Battle of Lạng Sơn (1979).

== Military career ==
In the Battle of Điện Biên Phủ, Hoàng Đan was Deputy commander of the 57th regiment of the 304th Brigade.

In the Vietnam war, Đan fought 8 years in Trị – Thiên battlefield as Deputy Commander (1965–1970), then Commander (1970–1973) of the 304th Division. In the First Battle of Quảng Trị 1972, Col. Đan was in charge of the Western flank with the 304th Division, four AAA Regiments, one Artillery Regiment, two rocket and one tank battalions.

He was appointed Deputy commander of the newly formed 2nd Corps in May 1974, then led the Corps' 304th Division cooperated with the Military Region 5 forces to carry out Battle of Thượng Đức in August 1974.

In the Sino-Vietnamese War, Major general Hoàng Đan was assigned Deputy commander of Military Region 1 cum Commander of the newly formed Lạng Sơn Front in February 1979. When PAVN formed its 5th Corps with four divisions: 3rd, 327th, 337th, 338th to protect Lạng Sơn in March 1979, Gen. Đan was appointed Corps commander along with Col. Phí Triệu Hàm – Corps commissar.

== Awards and legacy ==
In 2014, MG Hoàng Đan was posthumously awarded the Hero of the People's Armed Forces.
