= Battle of Lạng Sơn (1979) =

1979 battle of the Sino-Vietnamese War

- Part of the Sino-Vietnamese War
- A Vietnamese soldier armed with an RPG-7 rocket launcher defending Lạng Sơn in 1979
| Date | 17 February – 16 March 1979 |
| Location | Lạng Sơn and vicinity, northern Vietnam |
| Result | Chinese victory |
| Territorial changes | Capture and brief occupation of Lạng Sơn by Chinese troops |

Belligerents
| China | Vietnam |

Commanders and leaders
| Xu Shiyou; Zhang Tingfa | Hoàng Đan; Lê Thanh; Lê Sơn; Nguyễn Duy Thương |

Units involved
| 55th Army; 163rd, 164th,165th Divisions; 43rd Army; 127th, 128th Divisions; 129th Division; 54th Army; 160th, 161st Divisions; 50th Army; 3 Regiments: Unit 56037, Unit 56039, Unit 56229 | 3rd Division; 2nd, 12th, 141st Infantry; 68th Artillery; 166th Artillery Regiment; 272nd Anti-Aircraft Regt.; 407th Tank Regiment; 522nd Engineer Regt.; 12th Armed Police Regt.; Reinf. 22 – 25 Feb; 460th/338th Regt.; 4th/337th Regt.; 42nd/327th Regt. |

Strength
| At least 8 regular divisions ~130,000 troops: Fire support: 1st Artillery Division; 70th Anti-Aircraft Division | 1 regular division plus regional troops and militia Total ~13,000 troops (Reinforced by the whole 327th, 337th, 338th Divisions since 2 March) |

Casualties and losses
| Chinese source: 1,271 killed 3,779 wounded Vietnamese source: ~19,000 casualties 76 tanks/APCs destroyed | Vietnamese source: 3rd Division: 6.6% killed, 8.4% wounded 327th Division: no data 337th Division: 650 killed 338th Division: 260 killed Chinese source: 10,401 casualties (including ~300 killed of 42nd/327th Regt.); 50 tanks/APCs destroyed |

The Battle of Lạng Sơn was fought during the 1979 Sino-Vietnamese War, days after the Chinese People's Liberation Army (PLA) advanced 15 to 20 kilometres (9.3 to 12.4 mi) deep into the northern provinces of Vietnam. The fighting occurred primarily at the city of Lạng Sơn, a few kilometres from the Sino-Vietnamese border.

After capturing the northern heights above Lạng Sơn, the Chinese surrounded and paused in front of the city in order to lure the Vietnamese into reinforcing it with units from Cambodia. This had been the main strategic ploy in the Chinese war plan as Chinese leader Deng Xiaoping did not want to risk an escalation potentially involving the Soviet Union. The Vietnam People's Army (VPA) high command, after a tip-off from Soviet satellite intelligence, was able to see through the trap, however, and committed reserves only to Hanoi. Once this became clear to the PLA, the war was practically over. An assault was still mounted, but the Vietnamese only committed one VPA regiment defending the city. After three days of bloody house-to-house fighting, Lạng Sơn fell on 6 March. The PLA then took the southern heights above Lạng Sơn.

Although the PLA managed to capture and briefly occupy Lạng Sơn and its nearby vicinities, the campaign was slower and more costly than the Chinese leadership had anticipated, with the PLA's regular units suffering heavy casualties against the guerilla tactics of Vietnamese militia and irregular units.

According to the Washington Post, analysts described the battle as being an important Chinese victory for capturing the Vietnamese capital of Lạng Sơn. "They beat the hell out of the Vietnamese," stated one analyst in describing the battle around Lạng Sơn. "The Vietnamese know that; the Russians know that. That is all the Chinese are interested in." Vietnamese resistance being too heavily preoccupied elsewhere near Lào Cai and Cao Bằng in the middle of the front was highlighted as a contributing factor to the Vietnamese defeat in Lạng Sơn. Some Bangkok analysts stated Vietnam was at least successful in keeping their losses low by avoiding direct battles between its Hanoi based main-force units with the Chinese forces.

== Background ==
As part of the punitive expedition against Vietnam for the occupation of the pro-Chinese Democratic Kampuchea, Chinese forces entered northern Vietnam and advanced quickly about 15–20 kilometers into Vietnam, with fighting mainly occurring in the provinces of Lào Cai, Cao Bằng and Lạng Sơn.

The Vietnamese avoided mobilizing their regular divisions into the fight, using most of them for the defense of Hanoi. The Vietnamese forces tried to avoid direct combat, and often used guerrilla tactics to harass the Chinese forces advancing southwards. To make this work for the Vietnamese, they had to use their mountainous terrain to their advantage, which was a serious handicap for the Chinese trying to assault and destroy several Vietnamese irregular units.

== Preparations ==
The PLA General Staff Department placed the primary responsibility of capturing Lạng Sơn on the 55th Army from the Guangzhou Military Region and assigned the 54th and 43rd Armies from the Wuhan Military Region in supporting roles. Each of these armies of about 43,000 men was organized into three infantry divisions, one artillery regiment, and one anti-aircraft regiment. In addition, three regiments were also mobilized from the Chengdu Military Region, designated as Unit 56037, Unit 56039, and Unit 56229. The total strength of Chinese forces numbered about 130,000. The Chinese planned to launch their assault along all of the five roads that led to Lạng Sơn from the north, east, and south (Highways 1A, 1B, 4A, and 4B and the railroad for China), filling each of the directions with at least two or three divisions. From the border between markers 15 and 20, the 55th Army would thrust to the town of Đồng Đăng, while the 43rd would cross the border between markers 32 and 45, sweeping through Chi Ma before attacking Lộc Bình, which was 10 km to the southwest of Lạng Sơn, then moving northwest against the provincial capital via Highway 4B. The 54th Army would initially play its role as a reserve. Fire support for the Chinese Eastern Wing was provided by the 1st Artillery and the 70th Anti-Aircraft Divisions.

Meanwhile, the Vietnamese defense in Lạng Sơn was assigned to the 3rd Division, a veteran division of the VPA that had participated extensively during the Vietnam War. This division, comprising the infantry 2nd, 12th, and 141st Regiments and the 68th Artillery Regiment, had about 9,950 men, assisted by the 166th Artillery, the 272nd Anti-Aircraft, and the 522nd Engineer Regiments sent off by the 1st Military Region. Complementing these regular forces were the 123rd and 199th Infantry Regiments of Lạng Sơn province, seven local battalions of its districts, plus the 12th Regiment, some companies and border stations of the Armed Police. The total Vietnamese strength was approximately 13,000 men, meaning that they were outnumbered 10 to 1.

Three other Vietnamese divisions: the 327th, 337th, and 338th, stayed further from the front-line to serve as reserve units. To consolidate their defensive positions, the Vietnamese had built nearly 20,000 field fortifications, which were intensively camouflaged and supported by numerous minefields and obstacles.

== Battle ==
=== Taking out the defense around Đồng Đăng ===
The initial attacks was marked by Chinese artillery fire into Lạng Sơn at 05:00 on 17 February. The Chinese had paved way for their offensive throughout the night before by infiltrating the Vietnamese territory, cutting telephone lines and conducting sabotages. Waves of PLA troops from the 55th Army quickly overwhelmed Hill 386, a position situated 1.5 km south of the border, killing 118 Vietnamese. Though pockets of resistance were continued near the Friendship Pass and in Đồng Đăng, most of the Vietnamese defense was by then undertaken south of the town by the VPA 12th Regiment at the hamlet of Thâm Mô and its vicinity. After taking Hill 386, the PLA used the 163rd Division to capture Đồng Đăng and strike Vietnamese positions on the Thâm Mô line. The attack was backed by small groups of tanks arriving on Highway 4A. Fighting over the Thâm Mô area raged until 22 February, as Chinese charges in mass formations had been continuously repulsed with heavy casualties. The Chinese field commanders had to switch their tactics, using small-unit attacks to flank Vietnamese positions instead of frontal attacks by human waves. The change resulted in the fall of Thâm Mô to the hands of the PLA 163rd Division at 20:00. Đồng Đăng was taken on the next day.

Similarly, Chinese massed attacks to the east of Thâm Mô on Thâm Lũng, which had started from 17 February, were stiffly contained by the defenders. On 18 February, a Vietnamese counter-attack launched by the VPA 2nd Regiment drove PLA units back to their assemble positions on Hills 409, 611, and 675; this pattern was repeated on the following days. On 23 February, the PLA stormed Phai Môn, a position to the east of Thâm Lũng, using six waves of attacks, of which all were rebuffed. Chinese forces had to launch twelve more charges throughout the day to finally break through Thâm Lũng, allegedly suffering over 1,000 killed. At Cồn Khoang, a village in the rear of Hill 339, the Vietnamese 63rd Company had fended off the assault of an unevenly outnumbering Chinese force on 17 February, virtually wiping out an enemy battalion.

=== Approaching and occupying Lạng Sơn ===
From 24 to 26 February, fighting downscaled, as the PLA was holding back and regrouping. Two fresh Chinese divisions from the 54th Army, the 160th and 161st, moved up to spearhead the attacks, with the 55th Army behind preparing to advance toward Lạng Sơn. In meantime, the VPA 3rd Division had pulled out its troops from Thâm Mô to establish a new defensive perimeter between Cốc Chủ and Hill 417, on the western side of Highway 4A near Thâm Lũng, in order to keep the highway blocked, as well as to stand up to Chinese pressure from Thâm Lũng. On 24 February, the VPA 1st Military Region Command officially established the Lạng Sơn Front with Major General Hoàng Đan in charge. Among his three deputies were: Major General Lê Thanh – deputy commander of the MR, and Colonel Lê Sơn – commander of Lạng Sơn provincial command. On 26 February, the Vietnamese Ministry of Defense reinforced Lạng Sơn with its BM-21 multiple-rocket battalion, the 198th Special Operation Regiment, and the 98th Sapper Regiment from the 473rd Division.

At 06:05 on 27 February, Chinese forces renewed their offensive in Lạng Sơn with a four-pronged attack on Hill 417, Khau Ma Son, Pa Vai Son, and Khau Khao Son, giving friendly units time to encircle Lạng Sơn from the southeast and southwest. Khau Ma Son, a strategic 800-meter height located 4 km west-northwest of Lạng Sơn that virtually obstructed all major roads near the town, fell to a Chinese unit at about 14:00. Chinese control over Khau Ma Son made Vietnamese defense from Coc Chu to Hill 417 exposed to enemy's sight, as well as threatened VPA 12th Regiment's positions near Choc Vo. However, the Vietnamese reacted promptly, retreating from the Coc Chu – Hill 417 defensive line to a group of positions between Quán Hồ and Kéo Càng, thus blocking the highway access to Lạng Sơn once again. The VPA command also reinforced their battered 12th Regiment by deploying the 42nd Regiment/327th Division to Kỳ Lừa, which was about 1 km north of Lạng Sơn, to face off the approaching PLA 43rd Army. Yet the remainder of the VPA 327th Division were still stationed further to the south at Chi Lăng to prevent any possible deeper Chinese intrusions. Other regular reserves, including three divisions of the 1st Corps (the 308th, 312th, and 320th-B), were also assembled south of the Kỳ Cùng River to protect Hanoi, leaving the task of defending Lạng Sơn City to the 3rd Division and the 42nd Regiment alone.

From 28 February to 4 March, Chinese troops tried to push toward Lạng Sơn in a series of heavy engagements occurring to the north of the city. As the Chinese attacked, they also managed to take control over all the roads connecting with Lạng Sơn, thus employing Mao Zedong's strategy of "the countryside surrounding the city" in order to avoid a Vietnamese trap of a "second Verdun". By 28 February, they had captured all key positions that shielded Lạng Sơn from the northeast, including Khau Lau Son, Khau Bo Son, Khau Tang Son, and Pa Vai Son. Though seriously weakened, the Vietnamese 12th Regiment had not given up contesting Chinese troops along Highway 1B, with battalions and companies relentlessly defending Hills 607 and 649. On 2 March, a Chinese column on the highway was ambushed by a Vietnamese battalion. During the period of 2–10 March, a company of the Chinese Unit 56037 lost one-third of its men as it was holding a hill near Bản Lan against successive Vietnamese assaults. The PLA 163rd Division's advance toward the Kỳ Cùng Bridge on 1 March also met fierce resistance; one Chinese battalion was caught on open ground by heavy weapons firing from Hill 279, where the command post of the VPA 42nd Regiment was situated, and two rock hills near Dong Uyen. While the battle for Lạng Sơn was taking its course, Vietnamese forces also carried out raids against Chinese border towns of Malipo and Ningming, but caused no significant losses.

From the south and the east of Lạng Sơn, it took the PLA 43rd Army two and a half weeks from 17 February to reach the city. Its 127th Division marched from Ba Sơn between border markers 32 and 33 to Highway 1A at Cao Lộc, the itinerary which took the Chinese ten days just to overcome the distance of 5 km from the border to Bản Xâm due to drastic interceptions by the VPA 141st Regiment. To the south of Lạng Sơn, the PLA 129th Division targeted Hill 392, Hill 623, and the township of Lộc Bình after crossing the border at Chi Ma. It took the Chinese eleven days to seize Lộc Bình, which was still 22 km away from Lạng Sơn. Chinese forces kept using mass formation attacks to suppress the strong Vietnamese resistance on these directions.

On 1 March, the PLA 165th Division/55th Army eventually pierced the Vietnamese defense held by the VPA 42nd Regiment at Lam Truong, which was 2 km northwest of Lạng Sơn. Its sister division, the 164th, had also captured the headquarters of the VPA 141st Regiment at Pò Lèo, which was 1.5 km to the northeast. By 2 March, Chinese forces had secured most of the hills around Lạng Sơn, having the city virtually besieged. At Khánh Khê, they encountered elements of the VPA 337th Division, which had been sent to hold off Chinese movement against Lạng Sơn in the area. On 3 March, the Chinese launched their final assault on Lạng Sơn. Contemporarily, the VPA 3rd Division, presumably followed by the 42nd Regiment, had been ordered to withdraw from the city and incorporated into the newly founded 5th Corps, which consisted of the 3rd, 327th, 337th, 338th, and 347th Divisions, for the purpose of future operations. The 12th Regiment, which had been cut off from the rest of the 3rd Division, was assigned to continue defending enclaves along Highway 1B. The Chinese 127th Division advanced across the Kỳ Cùng River at Phiêng Phúc along a line through the hills west of Highway 1B, swiftly overrunning the defense on Mê Mai Hill on its way before capturing the Mai Pha airfield and Hill 391 on the southeast on 4 March. On the same day, Hills 332, 317, and 382 fell to two reserve battalions from the 50th Army. The 163rd Division crossed the river between Khủi Khúc and Khòn Pát, penetrating 5 km south of Lạng Sơn to Pac Meng, a movement which had become the furthest advance toward Hanoi direction. On 5 March, the PLA 127th and 129th Divisions entered Lạng Sơn City.

The bridge over the Kỳ Cùng River destroyed after the Chinese occupation of Lạng Sơn

=== Withdrawal ===
After Lạng Sơn had been occupied, fighting still went on in Lộc Bình and the town of Móng Cái in Quảng Ninh Province. On 5 March, the Chinese government announced the withdrawal of troops from Vietnam. During their withdrawal, Chinese forces had destroyed the bridge south of Lạng Sơn. Vietnamese units in Lạng Sơn, though badly mauled after previous clashes, still continued their fight against Chinese troops. The VPA 327th, 337th, and 338th Divisions, which had been positioned southerly near Chi Lăng to prevent a possible Chinese breakthrough, were finally committed to the battle for a counter-attack. The 337th and 338th pursued and harassed Chinese forces as they were pulling back and returning to Chinese territory across Chi Ma.

== Aftermath ==
Similar to those of the whole war, the casualty figures of both sides in the battle for Lạng Sơn are controversial: while Vietnamese sources claimed to have put 19,000 Chinese troops out of action, an after-battle report from the PLA 55th Army only found 1,271 killed and 3,779 wounded for the Chinese side in clashes around Đồng Đăng and Lạng Sơn. The Chinese also put the number of Vietnamese casualties during the battle at 10,401. According to Vietnamese documentation, the numbers of KIA and WIA of the VPA 3rd Division were respectively equivalent to 6.6% and 8.4% of its strength; each of the other divisions participating in the later phases reportedly suffered several hundreds killed.

Even though the PLA claimed the destruction of several Vietnamese regular units, Chinese execution of their campaign proved both ineffective and inefficient, as the PLA's outdated tactics did not translate into rapid advance, and its numerous casualties were exchanged for relatively small gains. Despite their heavy losses from the battles in Vietnamese border provinces, the PLA declared that the road to Hanoi was now open and that their goal had been achieved, and withdrew from Vietnam back towards the Sino-Vietnamese border, marking the conclusion of the war.
