= Đông Kinh, Lạng Sơn =

Đông Kinh Phường Đông Kinh
- Ward
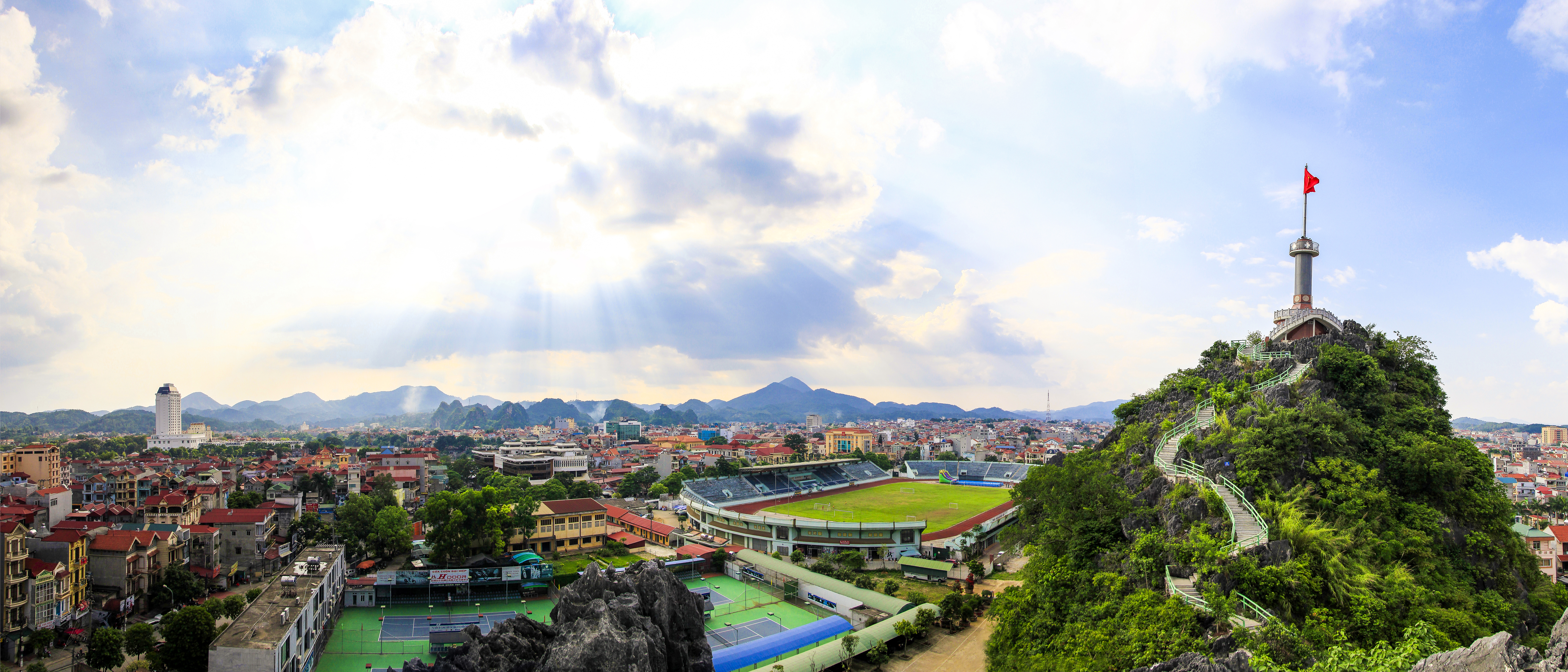
- Flag Tower of Lạng Sơn
- Interactive map of Đông Kinh
- Country: Vietnam
- Regions: Northeast
- Province: Lạng Sơn Province
- Established: June 16, 2025

Area
  - Total: 54.71 km^{2} (21.12 sq mi)

Population (2025)
  - Total: 50,436
  - Density: 921.9/km^{2} (2,388/sq mi)
- Time zone: UTC+07:00 (Indochina Time)

Đông Kinh is a ward (phường) of Lạng Sơn Province, Vietnam.

== Geography ==
Đông Kinh Ward located in central Lạng Sơn Province, and adjacent to:

- Kỳ Lừa Ward and Tam Thanh Ward to the north
- Chiến Thắng Commune to the south
- Lương Văn Tri Ward to the west
- Kỳ Lừa Ward and Chiến Thắng Commune to the east.

== History ==
On June 16, 2025, the Standing Committee of the National Assembly of Vietnam issued Resolution No. 1672/NQ-UBTVQH15 on the arrangement of commune-level administrative units of Lạng Sơn Province in 2025 (effective from June 16, 2025). Accordingly, the entire land area and population of Vĩnh Trại Ward, Đông Kinh Ward, Yên Trạch Commune and Mai Pha Commune were merged to form a new ward named Đông Kinh Ward.
