= Battle of Tam Quan =

- Part of the Vietnam War
Date	December 6–20, 1967
Location	Tam Quan, Bình Định Province, South Vietnam
Result	US victory

Belligerents
United States; South Vietnam	North Vietnam

Commanders and leaders
Donald V. Rattan; Christian F. Dubia	Nguyễn Sơn Diệp; Nguyễn Duy Thương

Strength
(United States) 1st Brigade, 1st Cavalry Division; 1st Battalion, 50th Infantry (South Vietnam) 3rd & 4th Marines; 40th Infantry Regiment	22nd Regiment, 3rd Infantry Division; 7th Battalion; 8th Battalion

Casualties and losses
(United States) 58 killed (South Vietnam) 30 killed	US body count: 650+ killed, 31 captured PAVN claim: ~140 killed

The Battle of Tam Quan took place near Tam Quan Bình Định Province.

== Background ==
During late November 1967, United States (US) intelligence detected that the People's Army of Vietnam (PAVN) 22nd Regiment of the 3rd Division was about to commence operations in the Bồng Sơn area. Between 1 and 4 December, the PAVN made probing attacks against Army of the Republic of Vietnam (ARVN) positions along Highway 1, however US and ARVN forces were unable to locate the PAVN.

== Battle ==
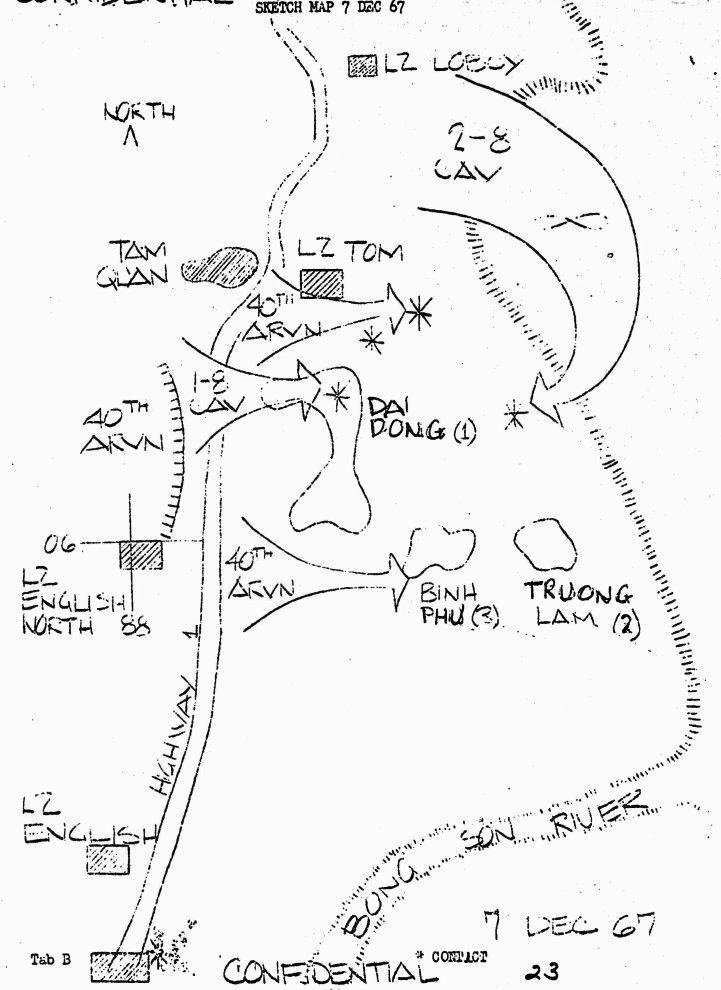
Battle of Tam Quan 1967 - Sketch Map - the 2nd day

On the afternoon of 6 December, the 1st Brigade, 1st Cavalry Division received intelligence on the location of the headquarters of the PAVN 22nd Regiment near the village of Dai Dong and aero-scout helicopters from A Troop, 1st Battalion, 9th Cavalry Regiment (1/9th) were sent to investigate. The helicopters saw a radio antenna and were fired on and at 16:30 aero-rifle troops were landed nearby, but were quickly pinned down by enemy fire. At 16:55 D Troop was landed to support A Troop, but they were also pinned down.

The 1st Brigade commander, Col. Donald V. Rattan spent the evening gathering reinforcements for an assault on Dai Dong. He put the commander of the 1st Battalion, 8th Cavalry Regiment (1/8th), Lt. Col. Christian F. Dubia, in charge of the battle.

At 17:25, the 1/8th Cavalry was ordered to engage and by 18:00 had landed nearby and joined up with an ACAV platoon from the 1st Battalion, 50th Infantry Regiment (1/50th) that had moved forward from Landing Zone English. By 21:00, this combined force had managed to extract the 1/9th troops. The force then set up a night perimeter.

Knowing what was coming, the PAVN 22nd Regiment commander – Nguyễn Sơn Diệp, his chief of staff – Nguyễn Duy Thương, and their headquarters slipped out of the village that evening and headed down the coast to the Cay Giep Mountains. Diệp ordered the 7th Battalion to continue fighting in Dai Dong, and the 8th Battalion to remain hidden in a hamlet several kilometers to the south known as My An.

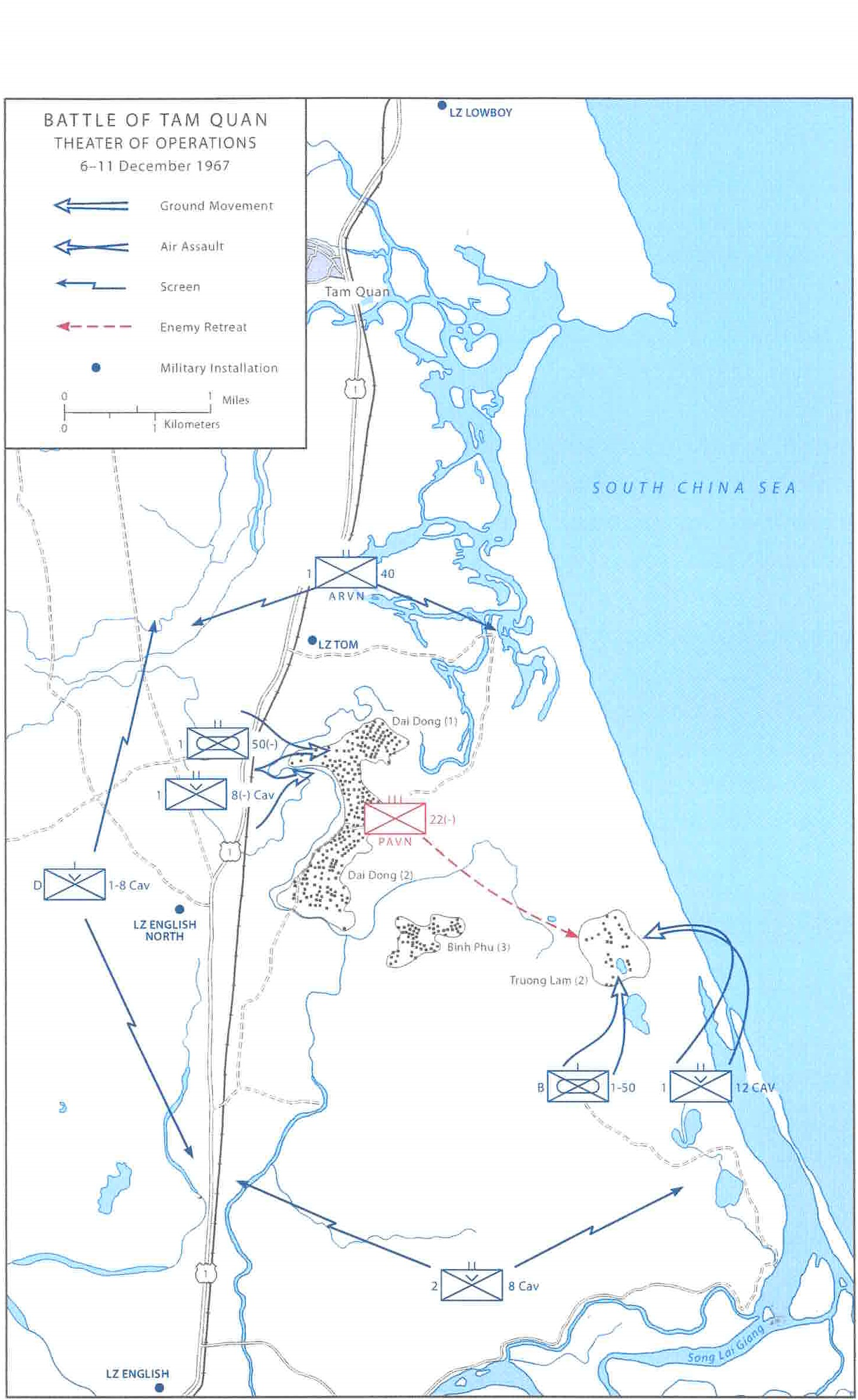
Battle of Tam Quan 6-11 December 1967

From 07:25 on the morning of 7 December, the site of the previous day's engagement was hit with aerial rocket and artillery fire and by 09:15 Company A 1/8th and Companies B and C 2/8th had been landed by helicopter and together with the ARVN 40th Regiment, 22nd Division formed a perimeter around the area. The 1/8th then began moving east towards the blocking forces, but met strong resistance from the entrenched PAVN and pulled back to allow tactical air strikes and artillery to soften up the positions. At 14:06, Companies A and B 1/8th, supported by flamethrower APCs, resumed the advance and broke through the PAVN positions while the 2/8th attacked westward.

The operation resumed at 07:45 on 8 December with Company C 1/8th relieving Company B 1/8th. At 08:15 CS gas was fired into the PAVN positions, forcing some soldiers to flee, who were then hit by artillery fire. Aero-scout helicopters identified 23 PAVN soldiers killed. At 08:50, 1/50th and Companies A and C 1/8th began sweeping the area, destroying the remaining PAVN positions. By 15:30, the sweeps were completed and forces began withdrawing to LZ English.

At 05:00 on 10 December, the 3rd and 4th Battalions of the ARVN 40th Regiment were attacked by the PAVN 8th Battalion, 22nd Regiment; the attack was repulsed with support by gunships and artillery. From dawn the ARVN carried out a series of attacks on the PAVN positions and at 15:45 were joined by Company D 1/50th for a final attack. On the morning of 10 December, the ARVN received reports that the villagers of Trường Lâm (2) (14.5078384°N 109.0678401°E now Trường An 2) were fleeing the area, Companies B and D 1st Battalion, 12th Cavalry Regiment (1/12th) joined Company B 1/50th to search Trường Lâm. At 10:55 1/50th came under intense fire near Trường Lâm (1), Company B 1/12th manoeuvred to their right flank, while Company C 1/12th was landed by helicopter on the left flank. This combined force made three attacks on the PAVN positions before breaking contact at 18:50.

On the morning of 11 December, following artillery preparation, 1/12th Cavalry assaulted Trường Lâm (2) and met sporadic resistance until midday. During the day the ARVN 40th Regiment was replaced by the South Vietnamese 3rd and 4th Marine Battalions. At 22:15, Company D 2/8th Cavalry ambushed several PAVN units as they attempted to escape the area to the South.

On 12 December, the combined force of the Vietnamese Marines, 1/12th Cavalry and Company D 1/50th began a sweep of the area. They engaged a PAVN force at 10:55 and overran the position. Search and destroy operations continued on 13 and 14 December with little contact.

On the morning of 15 December, 1/12th Cavalry located the PAVN 22nd Regiment and was later joined by Company A 1/50th. Despite intensive air and artillery preparation the attack was repulsed and the force withdrew to allow for further supporting fire to soften up the PAVN positions. During the day the 40th ARVN Regiment, Company B 1/8th Cavalry and Companies A and D 2/8th Cavalry established blocking positions around the PAVN.

On 16 December, Companies A and C 1/50th supported by Company C 1/12th attacked north through the village of Trường Lâm (1), meeting light resistance until midday. Companies A and D 2/8th Cavalry and Company C 1/50th pursued retreating PAVN. Search and destroy operations continued on 17 and 18 December with little contact.

On 19 December, intelligence was received on the location of the PAVN 22nd Regiment near the village of An Nghiệp (14.4720620°N 109.0852031°E). Aerial reconnaissance by A Troop, 1/9th Cavalry located a radio antenna and a large bunker complex. At 14:08, Company D 2/8th Cavalry was landed by helicopter and immediately engaged by a PAVN force. Company D broke contact to allow for air and artillery fire and three more Companies were landed by helicopter to the south and west to establish blocking positions. Artillery and air strikes continued throughout the night and the following morning Company B 2/8th swept through An Nghiệp, meeting no resistance from the destroyed PAVN bunkers.

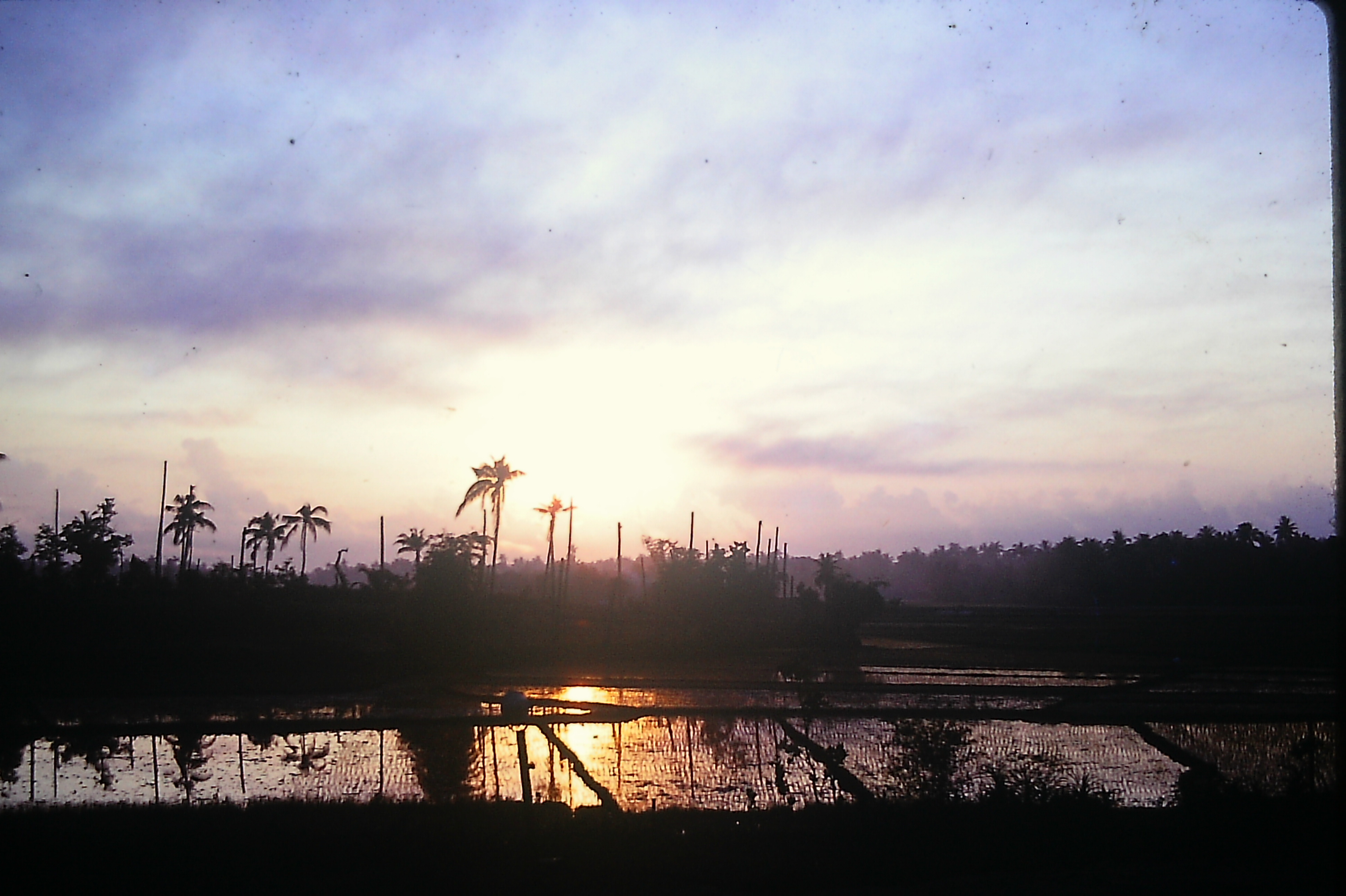
Photo taken the morning after the battle shows palm tops destroyed to eliminate sniper positions.

== Aftermath ==
The 2/8th Cavalry remained in An Nghiệp for three days, destroying bunkers and recovering PAVN dead and weapons.

Total losses in the battle were 58 killed and 250 wounded for US, ARVN losses were 30 killed and 71 wounded, and PAVN losses were 650 killed and 31 captured.
