= Tam Thanh, Lạng Sơn =

Tam Thanh Phường Tam Thanh
- Ward
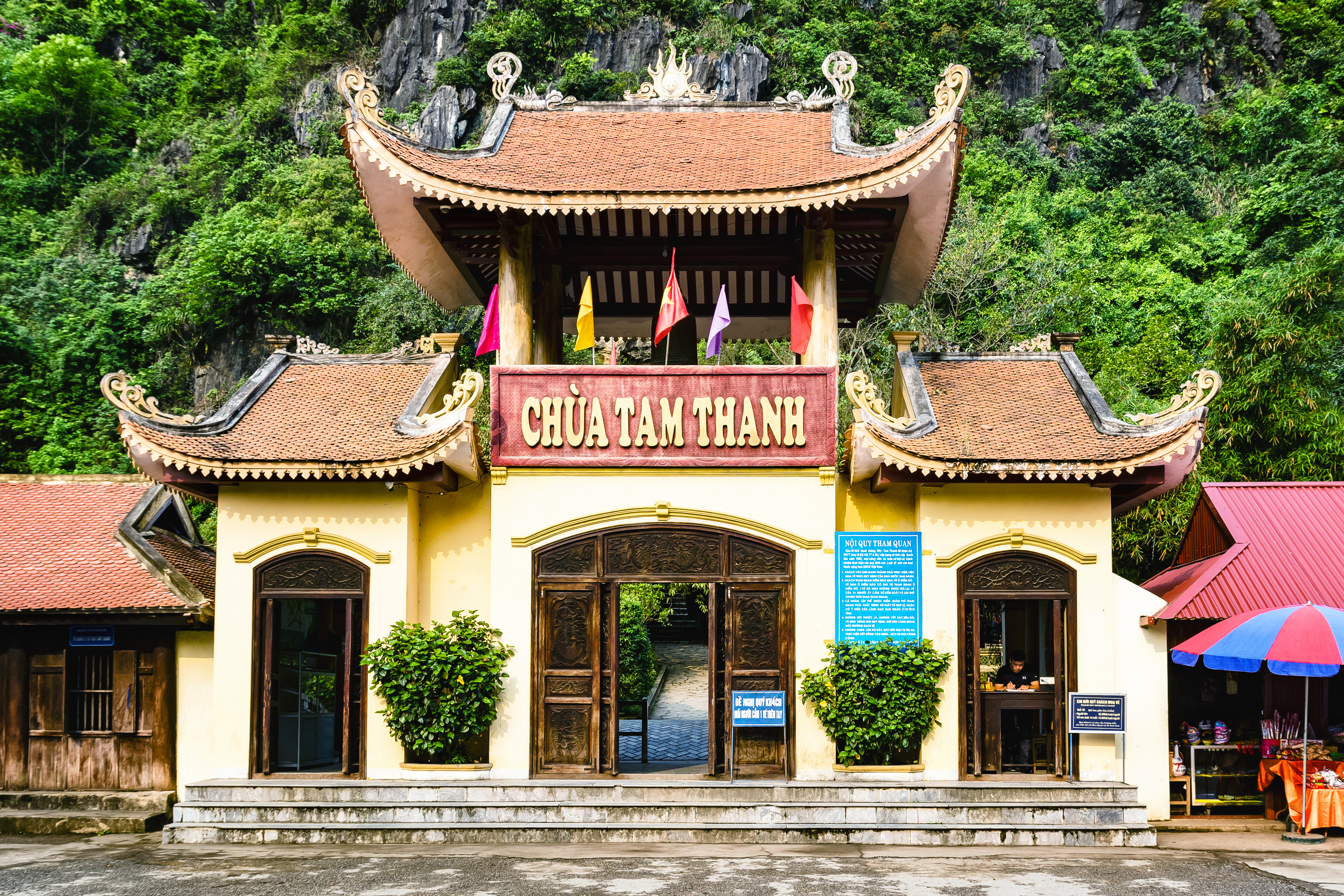
- Tam Thanh Pagoda
- Interactive map of Tam Thanh
- Country: Vietnam
- Regions: Northeast
- Province: Lạng Sơn Province
- Established: June 16, 2025

Area
  - Total: 27.35 km^{2} (10.56 sq mi)

Population (2025)
  - Total: 30,301
  - Density: 1,108/km^{2} (2,869/sq mi)
- Time zone: UTC+07:00 (Indochina Time)

Tam Thanh is a ward (phường) of Lạng Sơn Province, Vietnam.

== Geography ==
Tam Thanh Ward located in central Lạng Sơn Province, and adjacent to:

- Đồng Đăng Commune and Cao Lộc Commune to the north
- Lương Văn Tri Ward to the south
- Đồng Đăng Commune and Khánh Khê Commune to the west
- Kỳ Lừa Ward and Đông Kinh Ward to the east.

== History ==
On June 16, 2025, the Standing Committee of the National Assembly of Vietnam issued Resolution No. 1672/NQ-UBTVQH15 on the arrangement of commune-level administrative units of Lạng Sơn Province in 2025 (effective from June 16, 2025). Accordingly, the entire land area and population of Tam Thanh Ward and Hoàng Đồng Commune were merged to form a new ward named Tam Thanh Ward.
