= Lương Văn Tri =

Lương Văn Tri Phường Lương Văn Tri
- Ward
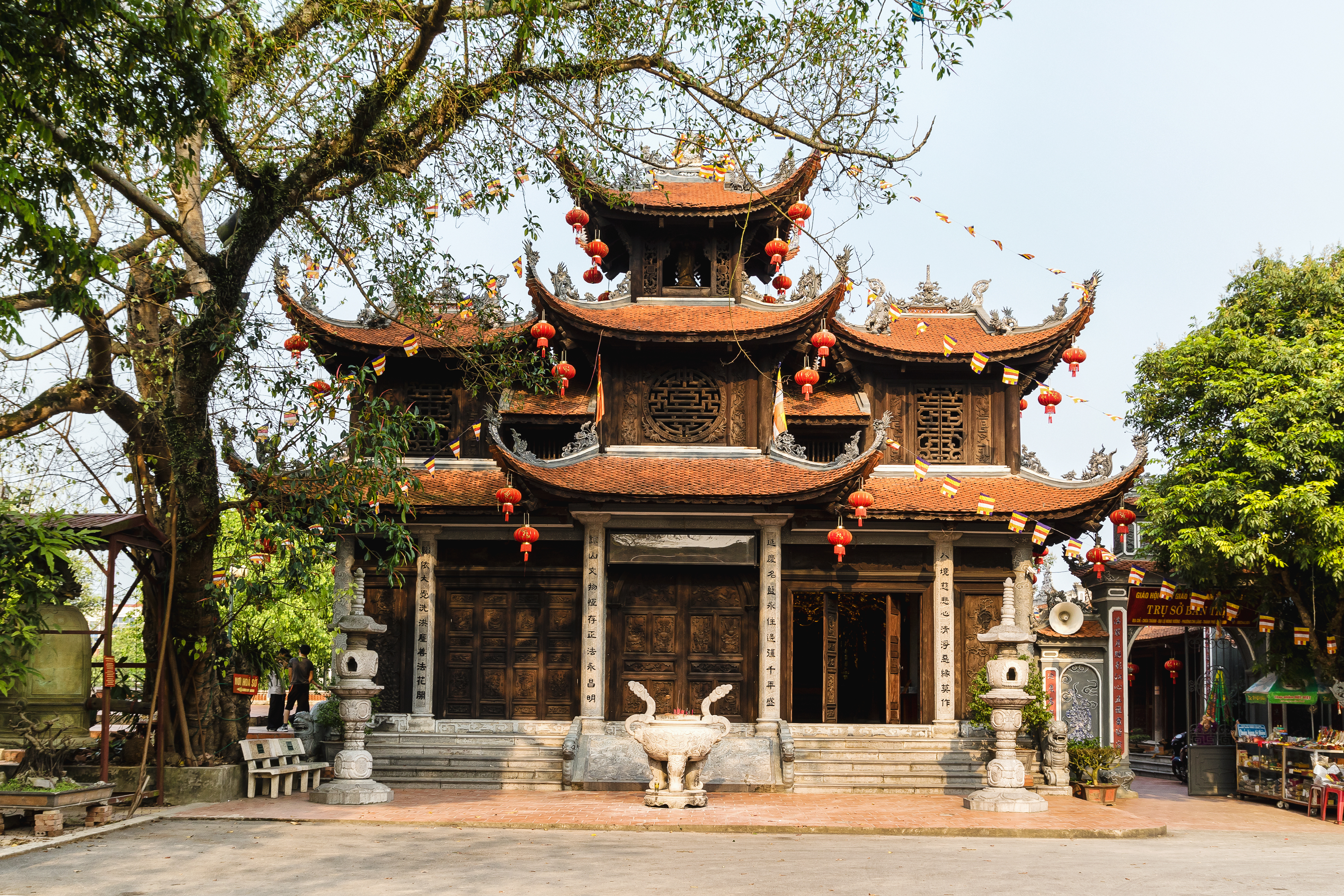
- Thành Pagoda
- Interactive map of Lương Văn Tri
- Country: Vietnam
- Regions: Northeast
- Province: Lạng Sơn Province
- Established: June 16, 2025

Area
  - Total: 31.76 km^{2} (12.26 sq mi)

Population (2025)
  - Total: 23,136
  - Density: 728.5/km^{2} (1,887/sq mi)
- Time zone: UTC+07:00 (Indochina Time)

Lương Văn Tri is a ward (phường) of Lạng Sơn Province, Vietnam. It is the capital of Lạng Sơn Province.

== Geography ==
Lương Văn Tri Ward located in central Lạng Sơn Province, and adjacent to:

- Tam Thanh Ward to the north
- Tân Đoàn Commune and Chiến Thắng Commune to the south
- Khánh Khê Commune to the west
- Đông Kinh Ward to the east.

== History ==
On June 16, 2025, the Standing Committee of the National Assembly of Vietnam issued Resolution No. 1672/NQ-UBTVQH15 on the arrangement of commune-level administrative units of Lạng Sơn Province in 2025 (effective from June 16, 2025). Accordingly, the entire land area and population of Chi Lăng Ward and Quảng Lạc Commune were merged to form a new ward named Lương Văn Tri Ward.
