= Lộc Bình =

- Commune
- Interactive map of Lộc Bình
- Coordinates: 21°45′32″N 106°55′28″E
- Country: Vietnam
- Region: Northeast
- Province: Lạng Sơn
- Established: 16 June 2025

Area
  - Total: 79.15 km^{2} (30.56 sq mi)

Population (2025)
  - Total: 23,316
  - Density: 294/km^{2} (760/sq mi)

Lộc Bình is a commune in Lạng Sơn province, Vietnam.

== History ==
On 16 June 2025, the National Assembly of Vietnam adopted Resolution No. 203/2025/QH15 amending and supplementing several articles of the Constitution of the Socialist Republic of Vietnam. Under the resolution, district-level administrative units nationwide ceased to operate from 1 July 2025.

On the same date, the Standing Committee of the National Assembly of Vietnam issued Resolution No. 1672/NQ-UBTVQH15 on the arrangement of commune-level administrative units in Lạng Sơn province in 2025. Under the resolution, the entire area and population of Lộc Bình Township and Khánh Xuân, Đồng Bục, and Hữu Khánh communes were merged to form a new commune named Lộc Bình.
