= Julia Compton Moore =

American military advocate

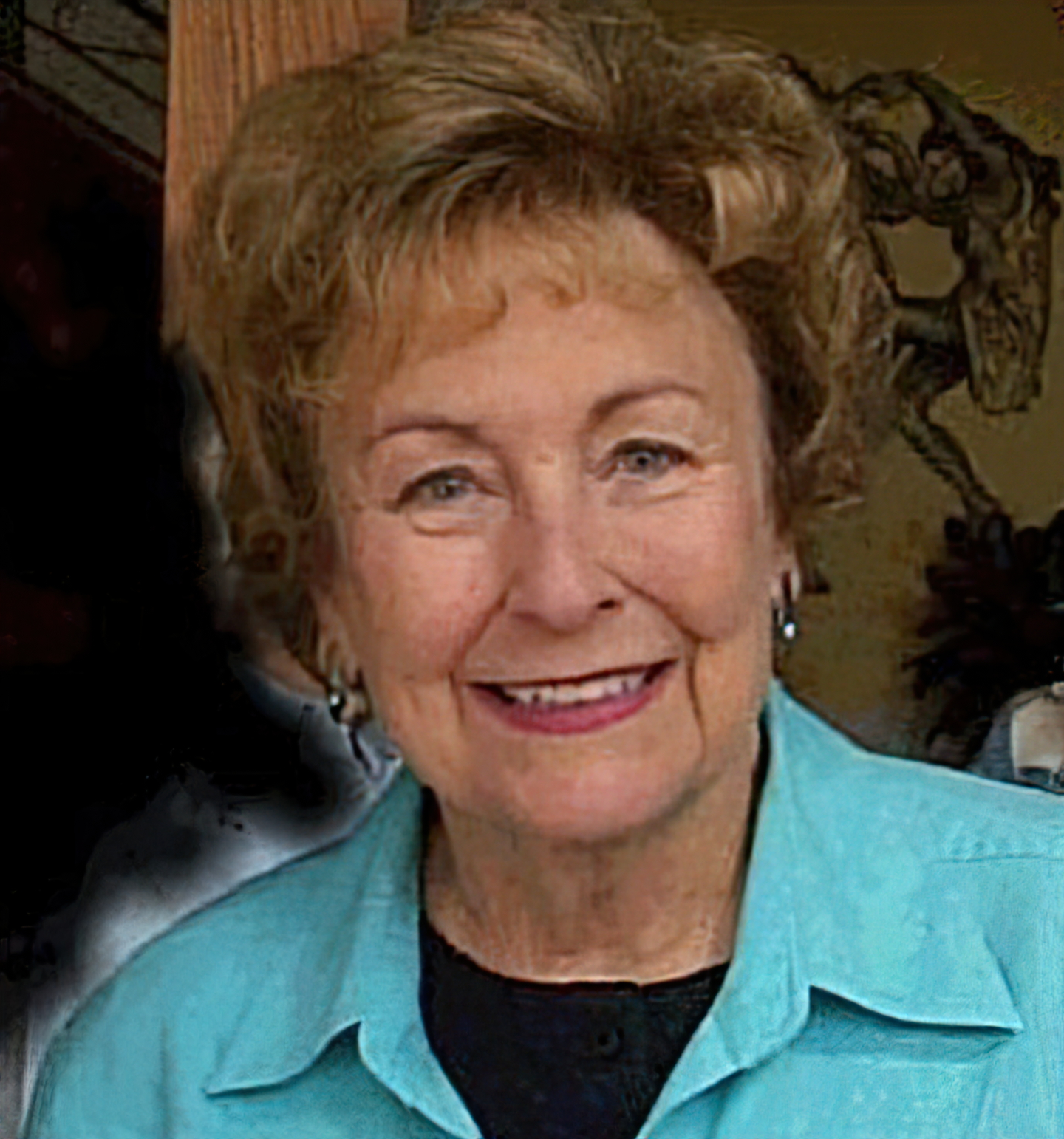
- Moore in 2002
- Born: Julia Compton; February 10, 1929; Fort Sill, Oklahoma, U.S.
- Died: April 18, 2004 (aged 75); Auburn, Alabama, U.S.
- Burial place: Fort Benning Main Post Cemetery
- Occupations: Army daughter, wife, mother
- Spouse: Hal Moore (m. 1949)
- Children: 5

Julia Compton Moore (February 10, 1929 – April 18, 2004) was the wife of Hal Moore, a United States Army officer. Her efforts and complaints in the aftermath of the Battle of Ia Drang prompted the U.S. Army to implement survivor support networks and casualty notification teams and/or casualty assistance calls teams consisting of uniformed officers, which are still in use.

== Early life and education ==
Compton was born in Fort Sill, Oklahoma, the only child of future U.S. Army colonel Louis J. Compton and Elizabeth Boon Compton. Julie would grow up as an "Army brat"; her family moved numerous times to follow her father's duty stations. Julie described what an "Army brat" was in a 1996 letter:

The term "Army Brat" does not fall into the dictionary meaning of "a nasty child". Far from it. Used with warmth, its special meaning is a child born into an Army family. Army brats the world over, many of whom knew each other while growing up at various Army Posts, are constantly running into each other all their lives. They are, in themselves, a kind of "family"—each member of which knows what it means to have lived their youth in an Army family constantly on the move and in a disciplined Army environment.

From Fort Sill, the family travelled to the Fort Stotsenburg in the Philippines on the USS Grant (AP-29) where Compton commanded a field artillery battery for 38 months. The Army in the 1930s was very formal, and Julie recalled her parents telling her they had to be ready to formally receive visitors each evening. Louis and Elizabeth would lay out their formal clothes on the bed and quickly change into them if a visitor arrived. After the assignment in the Philippines, the family was stationed at Aberdeen Proving Ground in Maryland; Washington, D.C.; and Fort Leavenworth, Kansas. For Col. Compton's final tour of duty, he commanded the Army Field Forces Board #1 at Fort Bragg, North Carolina. Julie's future husband, Hal Moore, was a parachute tester under his future father-in-law's command.

From the age of 12, while the family remained in Chevy Chase, Maryland, her father had assignments during World War II requiring him to serve in numerous locations. As the commander of the 15th Army, Colonel Compton oversaw the deployment of the unit from Fort Sam Houston, Texas, to the European theater. His troopship, the SS Empire Javelin, was sunk in transit to France. All but three of the well-disciplined troops survived the sinking. Upon return of her father from World War II in December 1946, the family moved to Fort Leavenworth, then Fort Bragg in 1948.

Compton graduated from Chevy Chase Junior College in Chevy Chase, then attended the University of North Carolina at Chapel Hill, as a member of Pi Beta Phi sorority, before her marriage in 1949.

== Career ==
Wherever her husband was stationed, Moore served as a Brownie and Girl Scout Leader and Cub Scout Den Mother. She volunteered with the Red Cross in the Army hospitals. She supported the day care centers and worked with the wives clubs to take better care of the enlisted soldier and his family. Moore was especially active in setting up the Army Community Service organizations that are now a permanent fixture on all army posts and which assist each soldier as they process into their new duty stations.

== Vietnam ==
Moore would serve in the Korean War and Vietnam War, and one of her sons would fight with the 82nd Airborne Division in Panama and the Persian Gulf War.

The Ia Drang Campaign was the first major ground engagement involving U.S. forces in Vietnam. The Army had not yet set up an adequate system of notifying the next of kin of battlefield fatalities. Instead, the telegrams were given to taxicab drivers for delivery, as depicted in the film We Were Soldiers. Unlike the film depiction, Moore did not actually assume responsibility for the delivery of the telegrams, however, she accompanied the cab drivers who delivered the telegrams and assisted in the death notifications, grieving with the widows and families of men killed in battle, and attended the funerals of those who fell under her husband's command. Her complaints to the Pentagon, and the example that she led, prompted the military branches to immediately create in-person notification teams consisting of one or two uniformed officers and/or a chaplain.

== Death ==
Moore died on April 18, 2004, and is buried at the Fort Benning Main Post Cemetery, near her mother and father, and amid the 7th Cavalry troopers killed in action at Landing Zone X Ray. Her husband died in 2017 on her birthday, and was laid to rest beside her.

== Legacy ==
=== Julia Compton Moore Award ===
One of Julia Moore's more important contributions to the quality of Army family life is summed up by the Ben Franklin Global Forum's press release, announcing the establishment of the Julia Compton Moore Award:

Mrs. Moore's actions to change Pentagon death notification policy in the aftermath of the historic battle of the Ia Drang Valley represents a significant contribution to our nation. Prior to Mrs. Moore's intervention, Pentagon policy was to notify families by a telegram delivered by cab drivers. It serves today as a shining example of one of Mrs. Moore's many contributions to the morale and welfare of the Army family.

The award recognizes the civilian spouses of soldiers for "Outstanding Contributions to the United States Army".

== Personal life ==
Compton was married on November 22, 1949, to Hal Moore, who later commanded the 1st Battalion, 7th Cavalry, in the battle of the Ia Drang Valley in Vietnam in 1965. They had five children:

- Harold Gregory Moore III
- LTC Stephen Moore, USA (Ret)
- Julie Moore Orlowski
- Cecile Moore Rainey
- COL David Moore, USA (Ret)

Two of their sons were career U.S. Army officers: one retired as a colonel; the other, as a lieutenant colonel.

== In popular culture ==
- Moore was portrayed by Madeleine Stowe in the 2002 film We Were Soldiers.

== See also ==
- We Were Soldiers Once ... And Young
- Joseph L. Galloway
