= Joseph Galloway (disambiguation) =

Joseph Galloway (1731–1803) was an American Loyalist and Congressman.

Joseph or Joe or Joey Galloway may also refer to:

- Joseph L. Galloway (1941–2021), American journalist
- Joey Galloway (born 1971), American football wide receiver
