= Death notification =

Delivery of news of a death

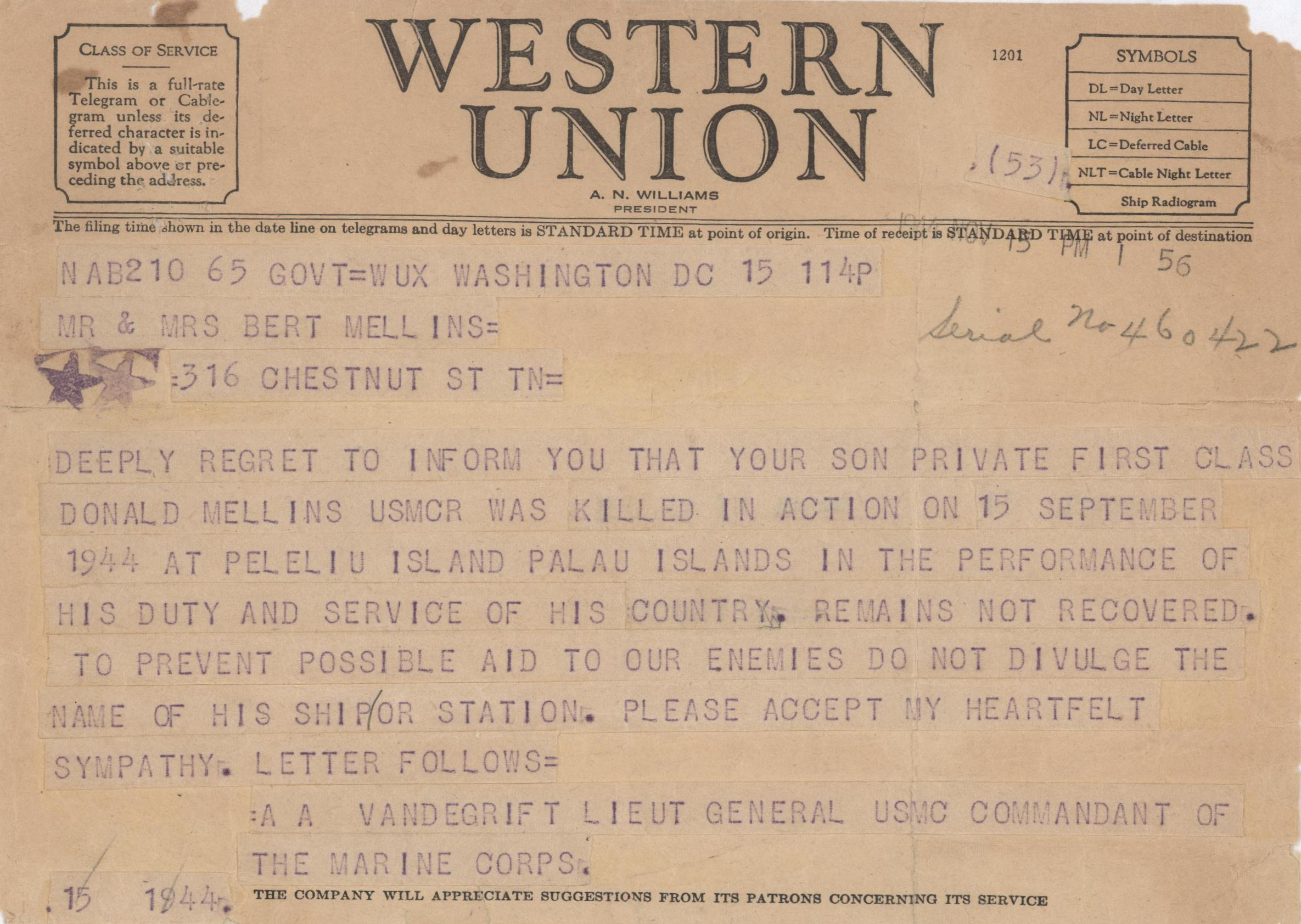
Death notification telegram, 1944

A death notification or, in military contexts, a casualty notification is the delivery of the news of a death to another person.

There are many roles that contribute to the death notification process. The notifier is the person who delivers the death notice. Notifiers can be military, medical personnel or law enforcement. The receiver is the designated person receiving the information about the deceased. Typically, the receiver is a family member or friend of the one who has died. Death education is provided for multiple types of jobs to deliver the news efficiently for each situation. A proper death notification allows the receiver to begin the grieving process.

Earlier, death notification occurred by letter or telegram. Where there were not the means to deliver a written notification, notices were left at funeral homes. Today, there are more requirements to follow. One of these requirements being that the name of the deceased is not released to any outside sources until after the survivors are being notified. One key reason being that the survivors are the first to find out in the formal manner.

== Protocol ==
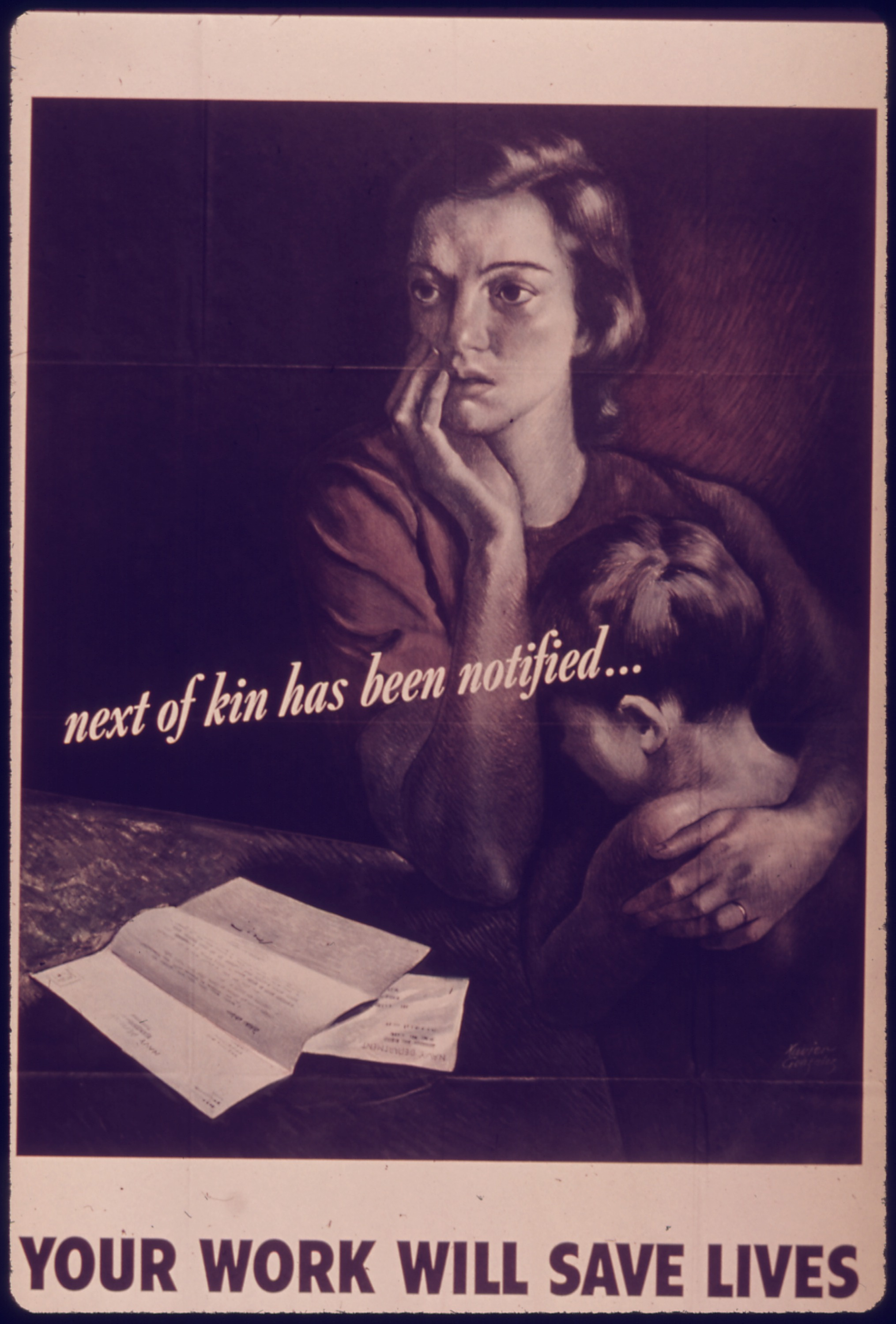
World War II poster, "Next of kin has been notified."

The protocol for each notifier differs because each situation is unique. Police officers become very involved with most families that deal with death outside of medical facilities. The news is usually delivered in person, as soon as possible, with another officer, in clear and plain language, and with compassion.

One of the main reasons there are two people at the home is so that if an individual has a negative reaction there is additional support for them and support for the notifier in case of a person lashing out. The officers enter the receiver's residence to make the situation more personal. A chaplain, a clergy member who works in hospitals, nursing homes, prisons, armed forces, police, or emergency medical services may alternatively deliver the news.

The main goal is to deliver the news of a death, but also to help mend a broken family emotionally and spiritually. They also must try to explain and make sense of the tragedy. Medics do not have time to establish a bond with the family and sometimes deliver the news in a formal manner, then try to reassure and relieve them.

=== United States Armed Forces ===
The United States Armed Forces set up casualty-notification teams shortly after the Battle of Ia Drang (1965) at the beginning of the American full-scale military involvement in the Vietnam War. Before, the notification telegrams were handed over to taxi cab drivers for delivery to the next of kin. Julia Compton Moore, the wife of commanding US officer Hal Moore during the battle of Ia Drang, followed in the wake of the deliveries to widows in the Fort Benning housing complex. She grieved with the wives, comforted the children and attended the funerals of all the men killed under her husband's command who were buried at Fort Benning. Her complaints about the notifications prompted the United States Armed Forces to quickly create in-person notification teams to deliver them, consisting of one or two uniformed officers and a chaplain. Mrs. Frank Henry, the wife of the battalion executive officer and Mrs. James Scott, wife of the battalion command sergeant major, performed the same duty for the dead of the 2nd Battalion, 7th Cavalry.

Death notification is done by specialists: casualty notification officers (CNO) or, in the Navy and Coast Guard, casualty assistance calls officer (CACO). Notification occurs within four hours of learning of the casualty, but only from 6:00 a.m. to 10:00 p.m. local time. The military withholds the name of the deceased until 24 hours after the family has been notified.

The relevant Army manual provides:

"The Next of Kin will be notified promptly in an appropriate dignified and understanding manner by a uniformed service representative. He/she will wear the Class "A" uniform and present a soldierly appearance when making notification."

The process for death notification in the military is a three-phase process. The notifying service members are usually in a four-member team. They include the notifying officer, a chaplain who accompanies the notifying officer throughout the process and who may also assist in delivering the news, a medic (in case the family member faints), and an officer who stays in the car in case the family members react violently.

The notification proceeds as follows:

Phase 1 – This phase deals with both logistical and personal preparation such as designating who will do the talking.

Phase 2 – This phase involves driving to the home, knocking on the door, and saying: "I have been asked to inform you that your [son/daughter] has been reported dead in [city, state, country] at [time and date]. [Briefly state the circumstances.] On the behalf of the Secretary of Defense, I extend to you and your family my deepest sympathy in your great loss".

Phase 3 – This phase is when the team leaves the home. The team leader must feel that the situation is under control before they leave the premises.

Denny Hayes, who spent fifteen years as a chaplain for the FBI's critical response team, says:

- Always deliver bad news in person.
- Always bring a partner ("95 percent of them defer to me to do the actual speaking of the words—nobody wants to experience sad").
- Skip the euphemisms—they comfort no one except the person speaking them.
- Never abandon anyone until they have someone else to hold onto.

"You can't make it better," said Dr. Nancy Davis, former chief of counseling services for the FBI. "But you can definitely make it worse."

== Death receivers ==
Death receivers include parents, children, friends, lovers, co-workers, and other incident survivors. Each receiver responds to the news in a different way because each relationship was unique to the deceased. Most parents want to hold their child's body and collect a physical memento. They often create a memory box filled with the child handprint, lock of hair, and/or clothing. Centers believe that parents should be encouraged to see their dead child multiple times to provide relief. Children have unpredictable reactions to death, depending on their age, previous experience with death, and the emotional support around them. When telling a child about a death, one should use real words to describe the death and let them know that the death is permanent. Children can understand death at a very young age so they should be told the truth about the situation. The notifier should answer questions the child has and allow the child to express their feelings. When notifying friends, encouragement to seek closure about unresolved issues with the deceased is most efficient.

== Death education in professions ==
Mothers Against Drunk Driving (MADD) received a grant from the Department of Justice in 1988 to train police officers in death notification. If done properly, the receiver will be able to go on through the mourning process. MADD began their death notification education program in order to create comforting and professional death notifications. Police officers have to report more deaths compared to any other occupation, which is why the education provided by MADD is crucial. Licensed social workers collaborated with health care professionals to create a protocol for notifying the family of the deceased. This includes having the family view the body and talk with the medical staff in order to answer questions about the situation and discuss the next steps to take.

== Notifications in various settings ==
Physicians and other health care professionals are faced with losing patients more times than they would want to think about. Due to this, they too are responsible for coming to the family with the distressing news. Along with law enforcement notification, physicians "do not receive specific instructions on death notification skills" (Henderson, 2012). Since there is a lack of training, this makes breaking the bad news extremely stressful, which then leaves the physicians more susceptible to burnout and becoming dissatisfied with their job performance and duties (Henderson, 2012). Explaining what happened and being clear with the family is very important when giving a death notification; not using words that are difficult to understand is crucial (Vandekieft, 2001).

Death notification can be completed in an office (work) setting and or a hospital. In both of these settings the notification is given in a room that the survivor can have their own privacy in. For example, when giving the death notification in a work setting, ask permission from their supervisor and take them to a private room to deliver the notification. When giving death notification in a hospital setting there are already set protocols, since it is a large institution, but it would still be in a private room. When giving death notification in a hospital it is key that this notification is not done in a common area such as a waiting room or hallway. Once the notification is complete there are various forms that survivors must complete and the notifiers help in completing these. Aside from the forms, the notifiers also can take the survivors to the body if the survivors choose to do so. The "last" part of the job that the individual notifying survivors completes is to follow up and stay in contact while the family needs support and help in answering any questions about the death.

== Universal guidelines for death notification ==
The collected experience of death-notification professionals indicates that there exist best practices for death notification applicable regardless of the specific field of the person(s) providing notification or of the circumstances in which the relevant death has occurred.

It is extremely important that a deceased's next of kin, along with other family members when possible, first learn in person of the relevant death (Campbell, 1992): First, providing initial notification in person ensures the notifying entity's ability to select and create conditions ensuring the presence of observable support and some measure of privacy for the bereaved. Second, by reflecting the notifying entity's prioritization of the investment of its personnel and their emotional resources, prompt in-person notification sends a highly credible informational signal with highly important content, namely care and support by the entity on whose behalf the notifying party acts. Third, prompt in-person notification is of critical importance (Flaherty, 2005) in precluding the opposite scenario in which the distress of the bereaved is compounded by their first learning of the death through social or mass media, a telephone call, or any other impersonal or less personal type of communication: Under such conditions, the absence of personal attention and of support is likely to be conspicuous to and deeply felt by the bereaved, and especially given the modern prevalence of communication via highly portable devices, the bereaved may be in a public place where they may feel embarrassed by their reactions reflecting shock and grief and/or may feel unfree to adequately process and express those emotions.

No matter the notifying party's profession, the notifier needs to deliver the death notification clearly yet sensitively, communicating both the necessary information and the delivering entity's care and support in a manner minimizing the recipient's distress beyond that unaboidably resulting from receipt of the necessary information. It is therefore highly important that the person(s) charged with performing a death notification consider in advance factors ranging from the informational content of the notification to the notification's phrasing to the para-verbal aspects of the notifier's delivery (e.g., the notifier's vocal tone, demeanor, and visual presentation including attire) (Moldovan, 2009). Attention to content and phrasing is essential for providing accurate information, ensuring that the information provided is unambiguous, and avoiding providing information that would cause the recipient distress outweighing that information's benefit to the recipient. Attention to the para-verbal aspects of delivery is essential for corroborating and reinforcing as opposed to undermining or contradicting the message of sympathy, care, and support signaled by the act of delivering notification in person. In particular, the notification's expression of emotion should be simultaneously clear and dignified, avoiding the two extremes of being so perfunctory or austere as to appear uncaring and of being so effusive as to risk creating an unseemly spectacle and/or suggesting insincerity (Vandekieft, 2001).

== See also ==
- Telegram of condolence

== Bibliography ==
- Leash, R. Moroni (1994). Death notification: a practical guide to the process. Hinesburg, Vt: Upper Access. ISBN 978-0942679083.
- Lord, Janice Harris (2008). I'll never forget those words: a practical guide for death notification. Burnsville, NC: Compassion Books. ISBN 978-1878321336.
- Sheeler, Jim (2008). Final salute: a story of unfinished lives. New York: Penguin Press. ISBN 978-1594201653.
- Bennett, D., & Campbell, B. (1992, September 1). In person in time (PDF)
