= Fort Benning Main Post Cemetery =

American military cemetery in Georgia

Coordinates: 32°22′47″N 84°57′10″W

Fort Benning Main Post Cemetery is a military cemetery at Fort Benning in Georgia. Over 10,000 United States Army soldiers and their dependents have been interred at the 8.38-acre facility since it was established in 1922.

The first recorded interment occurred on 13 December 1922. Other burials at the cemetery include forty-four German and seven Italian prisoners of war who died at nearby detention camps during World War II, as well as four allied Chinese pilots. As of July 2022, there are three Medal of Honor recipients and twenty general officers interred at the cemetery.

== Notable burials ==
=== Medal of Honor recipients ===
- SP4 Donald R. Johnston
- COL Robert B. Nett
- COL Edward R. Schowalter Jr.

=== Other burials ===
- BG Marcus B. Bell
- LTG William B. Caldwell III
- CSM Edward Crook Jr.
- MAJ Myron Diduryk
- LTG Harold G. Moore Jr. and his wife Julia Compton Moore
- CSM Basil L. Plumley
- MG George D. Shea
- LTG George R. Stotser
- MG Thomas M. Tarpley
- LTG Robert L. Wetzel
