= George D. Shea =

U.S. Army major general (1894–1971)

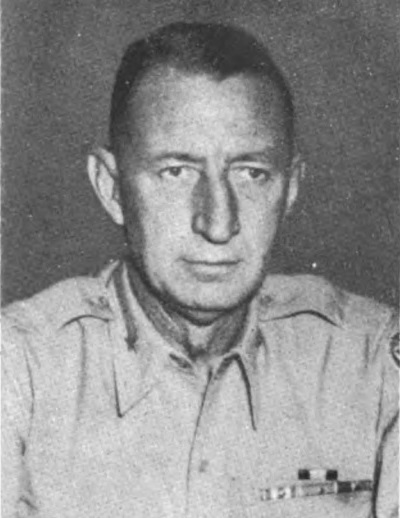
- From 1948's The Amphibious Eighth
- Born: January 11, 1894; Augusta, Georgia, U.S.
- Died: January 13, 1971 (aged 77); Coral Gables, Florida, U.S.
- Burial place: Main Post Cemetery, Fort Benning, Georgia
- Spouse: Edna (Manheim) Shea (m. 1934–1971, his death)
- Children: 1
- Military career
- Allegiance: United States
- Branch: United States Army
- Service years: 1915–1953
- Rank: Major General
- Service number: 05465
- Unit: U.S. Army Field Artillery Branch
- Commands: Battery D, 17th Field Artillery Regiment; 1st Battalion, 16th Field Artillery Regiment; Department of Animal Transportation, United States Army Field Artillery School; 90th Infantry Division Artillery; 141st Field Artillery Brigade; XIX Corps Artillery; War Department Personnel Center; 86th Infantry Division Artillery; Central Sub-area, Sixth United States Army; Army General School; 10th Mountain Division
- Conflicts: Pancho Villa Expedition; World War I American Forces in Germany; World War II; Occupation of Japan; Korean War
- Awards: Army Distinguished Service Medal; Silver Star (2); Legion of Merit (2); Bronze Star Medal (2)

George D. Shea (January 11, 1894 – January 13, 1971) was a career officer in the United States Army. A veteran of World War I, World War II, and the Korean War, Shea attained the rank of major general, and was a recipient of the Army Distinguished Service Medal, two awards of the Silver Star, two awards of the Legion of Merit, and two awards of the Bronze Star Medal, as well as several foreign awards.

A native of Augusta, Georgia, Shea attended the local schools and was a graduate of the Academy of Richmond County. In 1913 and 1914, he took competitive examinations for admission to the United States Military Academy and United States Naval Academy. He was selected for both, but declined in favor of beginning his military career immediately. In February 1915 he enlisted as a private in the United States Army. Assigned to the 1st Engineer Battalion, Shea attained the rank of corporal before successfully applying for a commission in 1917. Appointed as a second lieutenant of Field Artillery and assigned to the 21st Field Artillery Regiment, Shea served in France during World War I, and commanded a battery and battalion in the 17th Field Artillery Regiment, a unit of the 2nd Division. After the war ended in 1918, Shea remained in Germany and performed post-war occupation duty.

After World War I, Shea became qualified as a Cavalry officer, and he carried out a variety of assignments in the Field Artillery branch, some of which included horse-drawn equipment. In 1936, he graduated from the United States Army Command and General Staff College. During World War II Shea was promoted to colonel, and served as chief of staff of the 8th Infantry Division and commander of the 90th Infantry Division Artillery. Promoted to brigadier general in July 1942, Shea commanded the 141st Field Artillery Brigade during its organization and training at Camp Gordon, Georgia. When the brigade was redesignated as the XIX Corps Artillery, Shea continued in command, and he led his unit during combat in Europe from late 1943 until the end of the war in the spring of 1945.

After the war, Shea commanded the War Department Personnel Center at Jefferson Barracks Military Post, Missouri, then the 86th Infantry Division Artillery in the Philippines. He subsequently served as assistant chief of operations (G-3) for the Philippines Ground Forces Command, which was subsequently reorganized as the Philippines—Ryukyus Command. He served as G-3 of Eighth United States Army during its occupation of Japan and its organization and fielding of forces in South Korea during the lead up to the Korean War, and was promoted to major general in 1949.

After briefly serving as deputy commander and chief of staff of the Philippines Command, Shea returned to the United States in late 1949 and commanded the Sixth United States Army’s Central Sub-area at the Presidio of San Francisco. In 1950, he was assigned as chief artillery inspector for Army Field Forces. In 1950 and 1951 he was commander of the Army General School at Fort Riley, Kansas. From November 1951 to January 1953, Shea commanded the 10th Mountain Division, then a basic training unit based at Fort Riley. Shea retired from the military in January 1953. He died in Coral Gables, Florida on January 13, 1971. Shea was buried at Fort Benning’s Main Post Cemetery.

== Early life ==
George David Shea was born in Augusta, Georgia on January 11, 1894, the son of William Thomas Shea and Joanna (Bodeker) Shea. He was educated in the schools of Augusta, and was a 1914 graduate of the Academy of Richmond County. While at the academy, Shea participated in its corps of cadets, in which he attained the rank of captain. In May 1912, Shea won the Augusta YMCA's annual drill and ceremony contest, and later that month he received the Levy medal for winning the academy's annual competition.

In 1913, Shea competed for an appointment to the United States Military Academy by taking an examination offered by U.S. Senator M. Hoke Smith. He also competed for an appointment to the United States Naval Academy offered by Congressman Thomas W. Hardwick. He was selected for both, but chose not to accept either. Determined to begin his military career immediately, in 1915 he enlisted as a private in the United States Army's 1st Engineer Battalion. Shea served in the enlisted ranks until successfully applying for a commission, and he attained the rank of corporal. In addition to serving on the Mexico–United States border during the Pancho Villa Expedition, Shea was part of a team that carried out surveys of the Atlantic coast from Brunswick, Georgia to Charleston, South Carolina.

== World War I ==
In early 1917, Shea took the examination for an army commission, and he attained a near perfect score of 99.05. In June 1917, he was appointed as a second lieutenant of Field Artillery. With the army expanding for World War I, Shea was promoted to first lieutenant on the same day he received his commission. Assigned initially to the 21st Field Artillery Regiment, Shea completed training at Fort Leavenworth, Kansas and Camp Robinson, Wisconsin, then served in combat in France as a member of the 17th Field Artillery Regiment, a unit of the 2nd Division. Shea was promoted to captain in December 1917, and his wartime service included command of Battery D, 17th Field Artillery and acting commander of a 17th Field Artillery battalion. He was wounded during the war, for which he later received the Purple Heart. After the war, Shea remained in Germany for post-war occupation duty as a member of American Forces in Germany.

== Post-World War I ==
After returning to the United States, Shea served with the 15th Field Artillery Regiment at Camp Travis, Texas. In 1923 he graduated from the Field Artillery Battery Officers' Course, and he was a 1924 graduate of the Cavalry Troop Officers' Course. Subsequent assignments included instructor at the Field Artillery School. and in 1930 he acted as commander of 1st Battalion, 16th Field Artillery Regiment, a unit of the 4th Infantry Division. In the 1920s and 1930s, the army encouraged polo playing, believing that the game taught teamwork and encouraged leaders to make rapid decisions under stress. Shea played on several teams fielded by the units to which he was assigned, and participated in several tournaments. Shea also participated in other army equestrian events, including show jumping.

Shea was promoted to major in 1933. In 1936, he graduated from the United States Army Command and General Staff College. Following completion of the staff college, Shea was assigned as director of the Department of Animal Transportation at the United States Army Field Artillery School. In 1940 he was promoted to lieutenant colonel and assigned as the 8th Infantry Division's assistant chief of staff for supply (G-4). In October 1941 he was assigned as the division's chief of staff and in December 1941 he received promotion to colonel.

== World War II ==
In July 1942, Shea was promoted to brigadier general, and in August he was assigned as commander of the 90th Infantry Division Artillery, which he led during its initial organization and training. In September 1943, he assumed command of the 141st Field Artillery Brigade at Camp Gordon, Georgia. When the brigade was redesignated the XIX Corps Artillery, Shea continued in command and led the organization during its training at Camp Polk, Louisiana. After arrival in Europe in 1944 on D-Day plus 4, XIX Corps served on the Western Front until the end of the war in early 1945, and he led the corps artillery during combat as part of both First Army and Ninth Army.

== Post-World War II ==
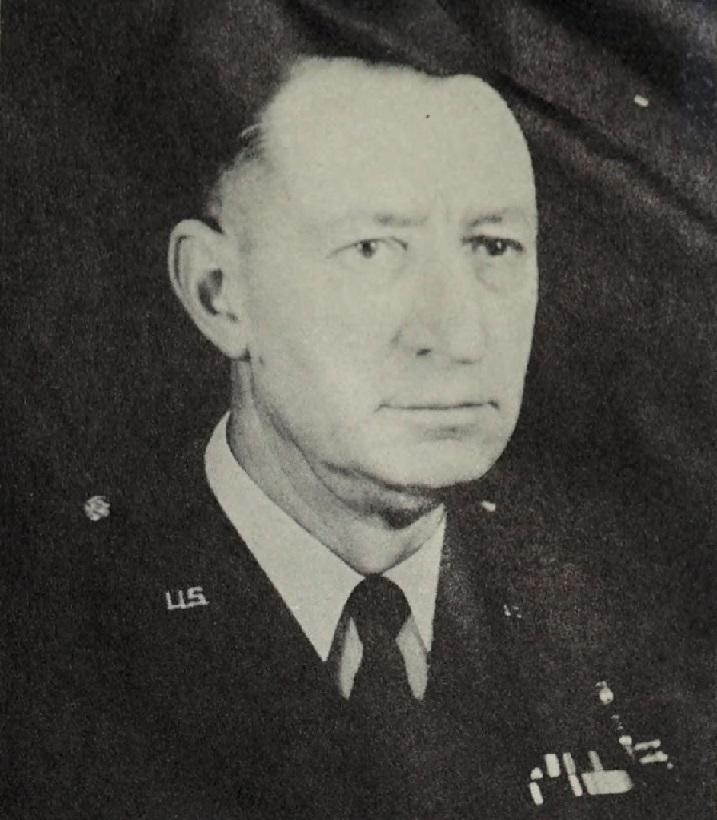
Shea as commander of the 10th Mountain Division in 1951

Shea returned to the United States in June 1945 and assumed command of the War Department Personnel Center at Jefferson Barracks Military Post, Missouri. In May 1946, he was assigned as commander of the 86th Infantry Division Artillery in the Philippines. Shea was later assigned as assistant chief of operations (G-3) for the Philippines Ground Forces Command. When this unit was reorganized as the Philippines—Ryukyus Command, Shea continued to serve as G-3. In March 1949, he was promoted to major general while serving as G-3 of Eighth United States Army during the Occupation of Japan and the command's organization and fielding of forces in South Korea during the lead up to the Korean War.

In early 1949, Shea was assigned as deputy commander and chief of staff of the Philippines Command. In November 1949, Shea was assigned to the Presidio of San Francisco as commander of Sixth United States Army’s Central Sub-area. In 1950, he was assigned as chief artillery inspector for Army Field Forces (AFF).

After briefly serving as AFF artillery inspector, from 1950 to 1951 Shea commanded the Army General School at Fort Riley, Kansas. During this assignment, he received credit for developing and expanding the army's Psychological Operations training program. Shea commanded the 10th Mountain Division, then a basic training unit based at Fort Riley, from November 1951 to January 1953. He retired from the military in January 1953.

== Awards ==
Shea's awards and decorations included:

- Army Distinguished Service Medal
- Silver Star (2)
- Legion of Merit (2)
- Purple Heart
- Bronze Star Medal (2)
- Legion of Honor (Chevalier) (France)
- Croix de Guerre with Palm (France)
- Order of Orange-Nassau (Commander) (Netherlands)

== Retirement and death ==
In retirement, Shea was a resident of Coral Gables, Florida. He died in Coral Gables on January 13, 1971. He was buried at the Main Post Cemetery at Fort Benning, Georgia.

== Family ==
In 1934, Shea became the husband of Edna Manheim (1908–1976). They were the parents of a son, George David Shea Jr. (1939–1992).
