= Hal Moore =

United States Army general (1922–2017)

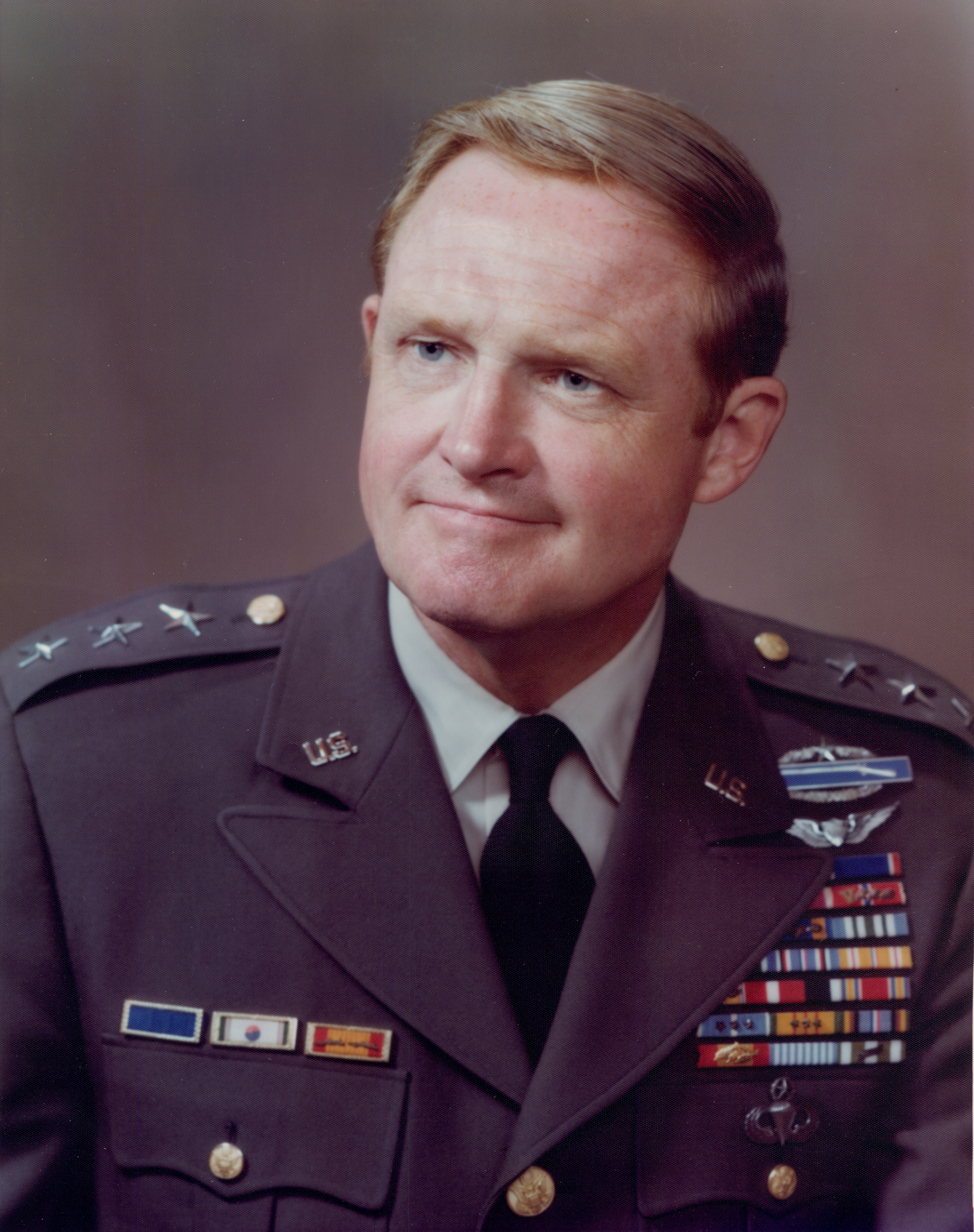
- Moore in 1975
- Born: Harold Gregory Moore Jr. February 13, 1922; Bardstown, Kentucky, U.S.
- Died: February 10, 2017 (aged 94); Auburn, Alabama, U.S.
- Burial place: Fort Benning Main Post Cemetery
- Spouse: Julia Compton Moore (m. 1949; died 2004)
- Children: 5
- Military career
- Allegiance: United States
- Branch: United States Army
- Service years: 1945–1977
- Rank: Lieutenant General
- Nicknames: "Hal", "Yellow Hair"
- Commands: Army Military Personnel Center; Fort Ord Army Training Center; 7th Infantry Division; 3rd Brigade, 1st Cavalry Division; 1st Battalion, 7th Cavalry Regiment; 2nd Battalion, 23rd Infantry Regiment
- Conflicts: See battles: World War II; Occupation of Japan; Korean War; Battle of Hill Eerie; Battle of Old Baldy; Battle of Pork Chop Hill; Vietnam War; Battle of Ia Drang
- Awards: Distinguished Service Cross; Army Distinguished Service Medal; Legion of Merit (3); Bronze Star Medal (4) w/ "V" Device; Purple Heart; Air Medal (9)
- Other work: We Were Soldiers Once… And Young; We Are Soldiers Still: A Journey Back to the Battlefields of Vietnam; Executive Vice-President of the Crested Butte Ski Area, Colorado

Harold Gregory Moore Jr. (February 13, 1922 – February 10, 2017) was a United States Army lieutenant general and author. As a lieutenant colonel, he commanded the 1st Battalion, 7th Cavalry Regiment, at the Battle of Ia Drang in 1965, during the Vietnam War. The battle was detailed in the 1992 bestseller We Were Soldiers Once…and Young, co-authored by Moore and made into the film We Were Soldiers in 2002, which starred Mel Gibson as Moore. Moore was the "honorary colonel" of the regiment. He was awarded the Distinguished Service Cross, the U.S. Army's second-highest decoration for valor, and was the first soldier in his West Point graduating class of 1945 to be promoted to brigadier general, major general, and lieutenant general.

Moore was awarded the Order of Saint Maurice by the National Infantry Association as well as the Distinguished Graduate Award by the West Point Association of Graduates.

== Early life and education ==
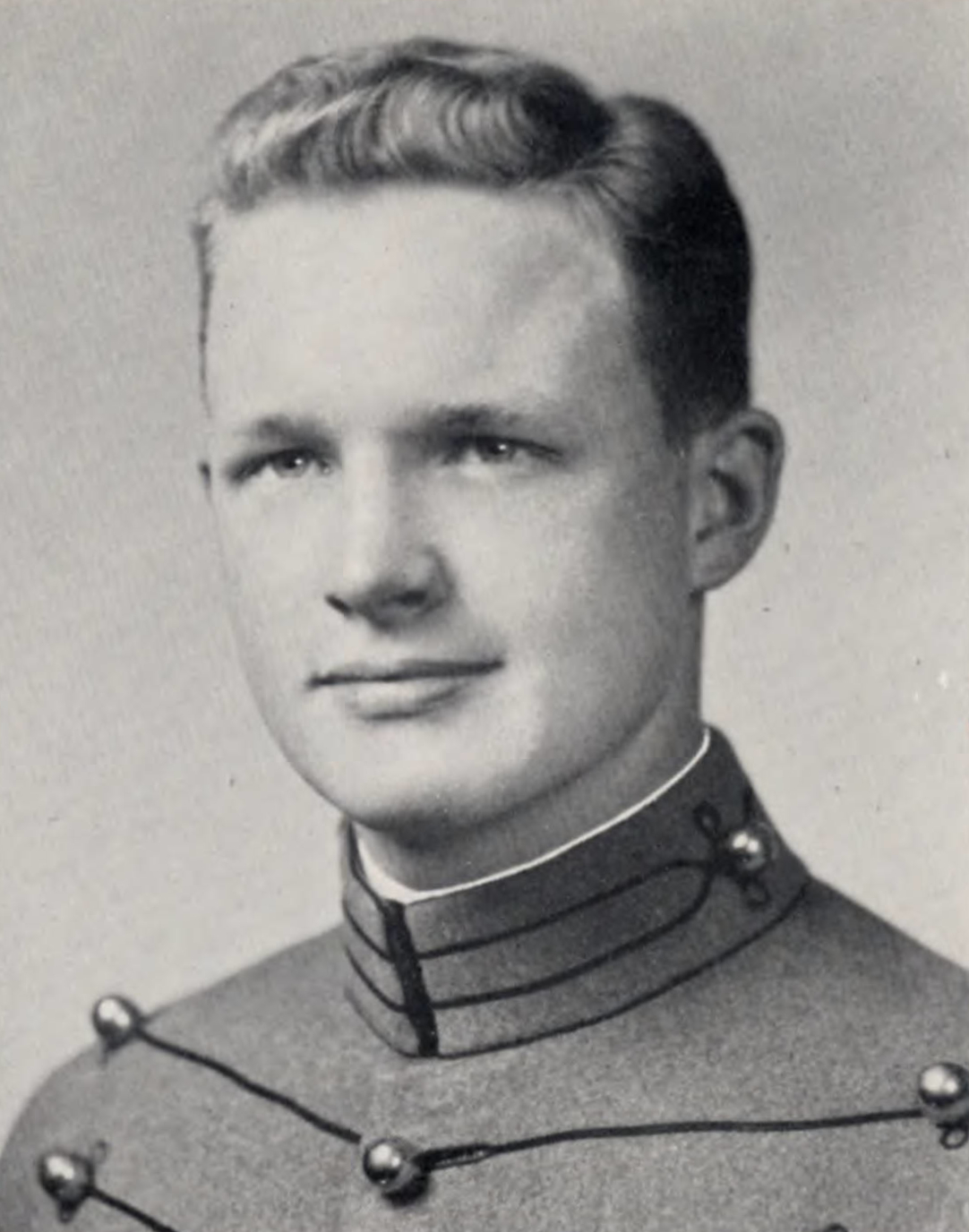
At West Point in 1945

Moore was born on February 13, 1922, in Bardstown, Kentucky, the eldest of four children born to Harold Sr. and Mary (Crume) Moore. His father was an insurance agent whose territory covered western Kentucky. His mother was a homemaker. Because he was interested in obtaining an appointment to the U.S. Military Academy at West Point, New York, and felt his chances were better if he lived in a larger city, he left Kentucky at the age of seventeen before finishing high school and got a job in Washington, D.C., working in the U.S. Senate book warehouse.

Moore finished high school at night while working days and graduated from St. Joseph Preparatory School in Bardstown with the class of 1940. Moore attended George Washington University at night for two years, working at his warehouse job while waiting on an appointment to West Point. During his time at George Washington University, he was a member of the Kappa Sigma fraternity.

After President Franklin D. Roosevelt signed legislation authorizing each senator and representative to make additional appointments to the military and naval academies, Moore was offered an appointment to the United States Naval Academy by Representative Ed Creal of the 4th Congressional District of Kentucky. Moore had no desire to go to the Naval Academy. Moore instead asked Creal whether he would be willing to trade his Naval Academy appointment to another congressman for an open Military Academy appointment for Moore, if Moore could find a willing partner for the exchange. Creal agreed, and Moore soon found Representative Eugene Cox of Georgia's 2nd Congressional District, who had an open appointment to West Point. Cox was impressed with Moore's tenacity and he left Cox's office with the West Point appointment.

== Military service ==
=== West Point ===
Moore received his appointment to the U.S. Military Academy shortly after the United States entered into World War II. He reported to West Point for "Reception Day" on July 15, 1942, and the summer training referred to as "Beast Barracks" held before the formal academic school term took up in the fall. During his plebe summer at Pine Camp, he qualified as an expert on the M-1 Garand rifle and was the top scorer in his company. Although Moore did well in most of his classes, he was academically deficient in the required math subjects and he had to redouble his efforts to absorb the engineering, physics and chemistry, often studying two or three hours past lights out to memorize the material.

In the fall of 1942, his class received the news that because of the war, his class would graduate in three years rather than the usual four years. Moore made it through the plebe year, but just barely, as he put it, it was "an academic trip from hell." This observation caused Moore to lead a student's life at West Point devoted to studying, with few extracurricular activities. After a ten-day furlough, he reported to Camp Popolopen for summer military training, where his company trained with vehicles and fired many types of weapons. (Note: The name of Camp Popolopen was changed to Camp Buckner after World War II to honor General Simon Bolivar Buckner Jr., who was killed in action during the closing days of the Battle of Okinawa.) The summer ended with maneuvers held again at Pine Camp.

In his second year at the academy, he studied more complicated subjects like calculus, electrical engineering, thermodynamics and historic military campaigns. Wednesdays were spent watching the latest Staff Combat Film Report, which reported the most recent fighting from the Pacific and European war fronts. Summer military training after his second year consisted of touring U.S. Army basic training centers to study tactics and techniques.

His final academic year was spent studying military history and tactics as the war was winding down in Europe. Just before graduation, each cadet selected his branch of assignment, dependent upon their academic standing in the class and the quota of openings in each branch. Moore was in the bottom fifteen percent and he wanted an infantry assignment. When his name was finally called to declare, there were still infantry openings available. Moore graduated from West Point on June 5, 1945, and he was commissioned as a second lieutenant in the infantry branch.

=== After World War II ===
Moore's first assignment after graduation was the Infantry Officer Basic Course at Fort Benning, Georgia, which was a six-week course. During the basic course he applied for the airborne jump school at Fort Benning. He was not selected, and was instead assigned to the three-week jump school held at the 11th Airborne Division in Tokyo, Japan. His first assignment out of jump school was with the 187th Glider Infantry Regiment at Camp Crawford near Sapporo, Japan from 1945 until 1948.

After seven months as company commander, he was assigned as Camp Crawford's construction officer and responsible for all of the construction improvements being made at the camp. In June 1948, he was reassigned to the 82nd Airborne Division, at Fort Bragg. He volunteered to join the Airborne Test Section, a special unit testing experimental parachutes. In November 1948, he made the first of some 150 jumps with the section over the next two years. Over the course of his career, he became a jumpmaster, with over 300 jumps.

=== Korean War ===
In 1951, amidst the Korean War (1950–1953), he was ordered to Fort Benning to attend the Infantry Officer's Advanced Course, which would prepare him to command a company or to serve on a battalion staff. In June 1952, Moore was assigned to the 17th Infantry Regiment of the 7th Infantry Division. As a Captain, he commanded a heavy mortar company in combat. He next served as regimental Assistant Chief-of-Staff, Operations and Plans. Moore's promotion to major was put on hold by a policy of the 7th Division commanding general, that stated that no promotion to major would be possible without command of an infantry company in combat. The division commander personally assigned Moore to an infantry company so that Moore could be promoted to major, and thus later become divisional assistant chief-of staff for operations. By the end of the Korean War, Moore had participated in the battles of T-Bone, Alligator Jaws, Old baldy, and Pork Chop Hill.

=== Return to the United States ===
In 1954, Moore returned to West Point and served for three years as an instructor in infantry tactics. While serving as an instructor, Moore taught then-Cadet Norman Schwarzkopf, who called Moore one of his "heroes," and cites Moore as the reason he chose the infantry branch upon graduation. (Schwarzkopf later became a general in the U.S. Army and led the U.N. coalition forces in the Persian Gulf War against Iraq.) During this assignment, Moore took a personal interest in the battles between the French Army forces and the Việt Minh at Điện Biên Phủ in Vietnam.

In 1956, Moore was assigned to attend the year-long student course at the Command and General Staff College at Fort Leavenworth, Kansas. The course prepared majors for the duties of staff officers at the division and corps level. After study at Fort Leavenworth, Moore reported to the Pentagon and the Office, Chief of Research and Development where his initiative and insights were key to the development of new airborne equipment and airborne/air assault tactics. In 1960, following graduation from the Armed Forces Staff College at Norfolk, Virginia, Moore served a three-year tour as NATO Plans Officer with Headquarters, Allied Forces Northern Europe in Oslo, Norway.

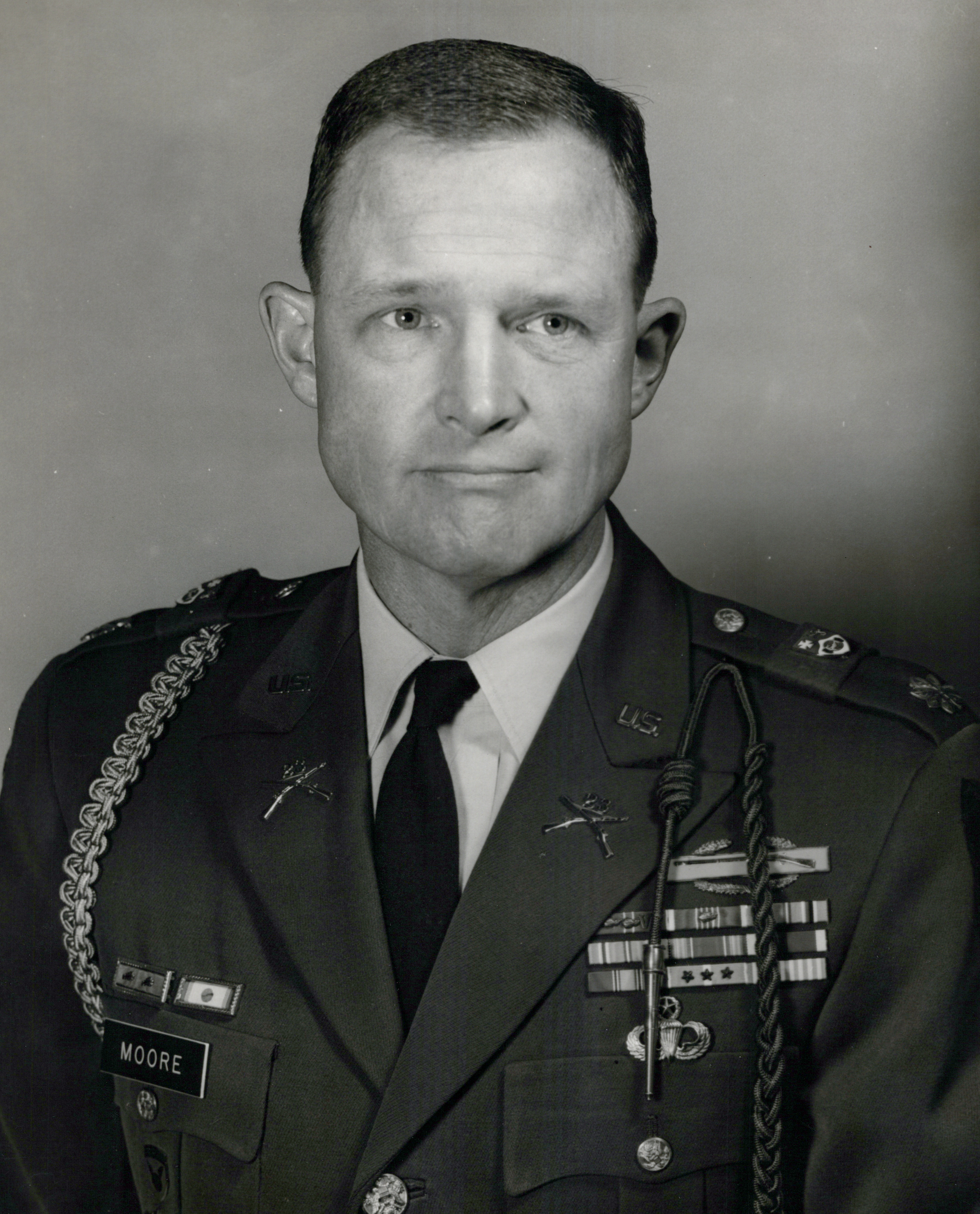
Moore in 1965

In 1964, now a lieutenant colonel, Moore completed the course of study at the National War College, while earning a master's degree in International Relations from George Washington University in Washington, DC. Moore was transferred to Fort Benning and commanded 2nd Battalion, 23rd Infantry later to become a part of 11th Air Assault Division, undergoing air assault and air mobility training and tests. On July 28, 1965, President Lyndon Johnson announced that he was sending "the Airmobile Division to Vietnam".

In July, the 11th Air Assault Division was re-designated the 1st Cavalry Division (Airmobile) and alerted for deployment to Vietnam. Moore's battalion was re-designated as 1st Battalion, 7th Cavalry Regiment, 1st Cavalry Division, the same regiment that was under the command of Lieutenant Colonel George Custer when the Irish song Garry Owen was adopted as a marching tune. The "Garry Owen" Brigade left Fort Benning August 14, 1965, and went to South Vietnam by way of the Panama Canal aboard USNS General Maurice Rose, arriving at the Division's An Khê Base Camp a month later.

=== Vietnam War ===
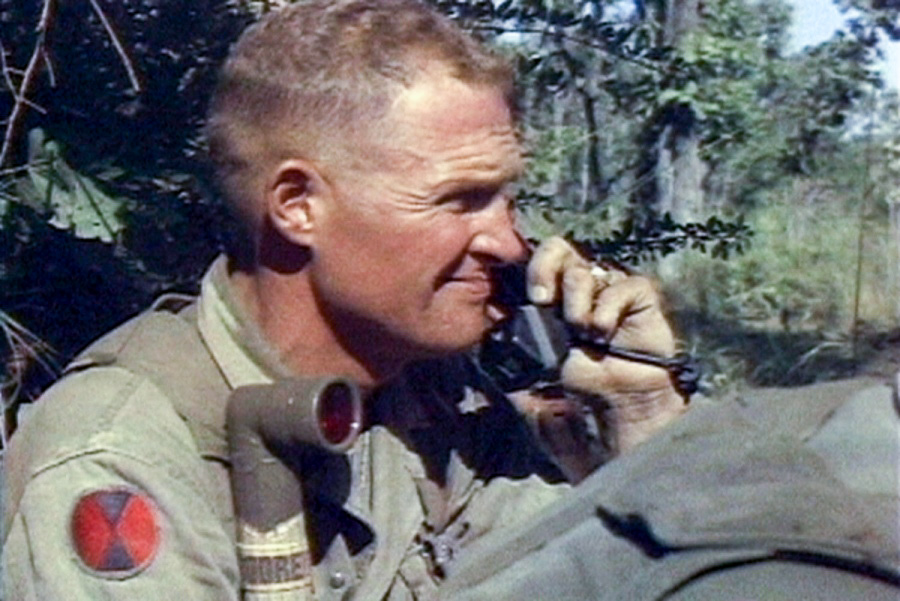
Moore during the Battle of Ia Drang, 1965.

Beginning on November 14, 1965, Lt. Col. Moore led the 1st Battalion, 7th Cavalry of the 3rd Brigade, 1st Cavalry Division (Airmobile) in the week-long Battle of Ia Drang. Encircled by enemy soldiers with no clear landing zone that would allow them to leave, Moore managed to persevere despite being significantly outnumbered by North Vietnamese Army (NVA) forces that engaged the 2nd Battalion, 7th Cavalry, only two-and-a-half miles away the next day. Moore's dictum that "there is always one more thing you can do to increase your odds of success" and the courage of his entire command are credited by Moore with this outcome.

Moore was wounded and earned a Purple Heart. Because the wound wasn't serious, he did not believe he was entitled to the medal, and unsuccessfully tried to return it. He never wore the ribbon or the medal on his uniform. The blond haired Moore was known as "Yellow Hair" to his troops at the battle at Ia Drang, also a tongue-in-cheek homage referencing the legendary General George Armstrong Custer, who commanded as a lieutenant colonel the same 7th Cavalry Regiment at the Battle of the Little Bighorn just under a century before. Moore was awarded the Distinguished Service Cross for extraordinary heroism at Ia Drang. After the Battle of the Ia Drang Valley, Moore was promoted to colonel and took over the command of the Garry Owen (3rd) Brigade.

=== Post-Vietnam War service ===
After his service in the Vietnam War, Moore served at the Pentagon as the military liaison to the Assistant Secretary for International Affairs in the Office of the Under Secretary of Defense. In his next assignment the Army sent him to Harvard University, where he completed his M.A. in International Relations in 1968. Having completed his work at Harvard, Moore reported back to the Pentagon to work with the Deputy Chief-of-Staff for Operations. He then helped draft the Army plan for the withdrawal of two brigades of the 9th Infantry Division to the United States as a part of the Vietnamization of the war effort.

In August 1968, Moore was promoted to the rank of brigadier general. In July 1969, he was assigned as assistant chief of staff, operations and plans, of the Eighth Army in South Korea, where tensions were high from demilitarized zone incursions and drug use and racism among Eighth Army troops were at an all-time high. Shortly after becoming commanding general of the 7th Infantry Division, Moore was promoted to major general in 1970 and he and his family moved to Camp Casey, South Korea. He was charged by General John H. Michaelis, commander, United States Forces Korea, with cleaning up the drug abuse problem and racial strife that were prevalent at the time in the 7th Division.

His plan established Officer's Leadership Schools for company-grade officers and an NCO Leadership School for staff sergeants and below as well as issuing an "Equal Opportunity Policy". He backed up the policy with the promise to punish those leaders who discriminated based on race, ethnicity or creed. As a part of the reformation of division morale, he established several different athletic programs, including football, basketball, and boxing. In 1971–1973, as commanding general of the Army Training Center at Fort Ord, California, he oversaw extensive experimentation in adapting basic and advanced individual training under Project VOLAR, in preparation for the end of conscription and the institution of the Modern Volunteer Army.

In August 1973, Moore was assigned as commanding general, US Army Military Personnel Center (MILPERCEN). In 1974, he was appointed deputy chief of staff for personnel, Department of the Army, his last assignment before leaving the army. He dealt with army recruiting issues after the termination of the draft, as well as the orderly reduction of forces after the close of the Vietnam War. Moore's next assignment would have been to become the commanding general, U.S. Army Japan, but he decided to retire instead. Moore retired from the army on August 1, 1977, after completing 32 years of active service.

== Personal life and death ==
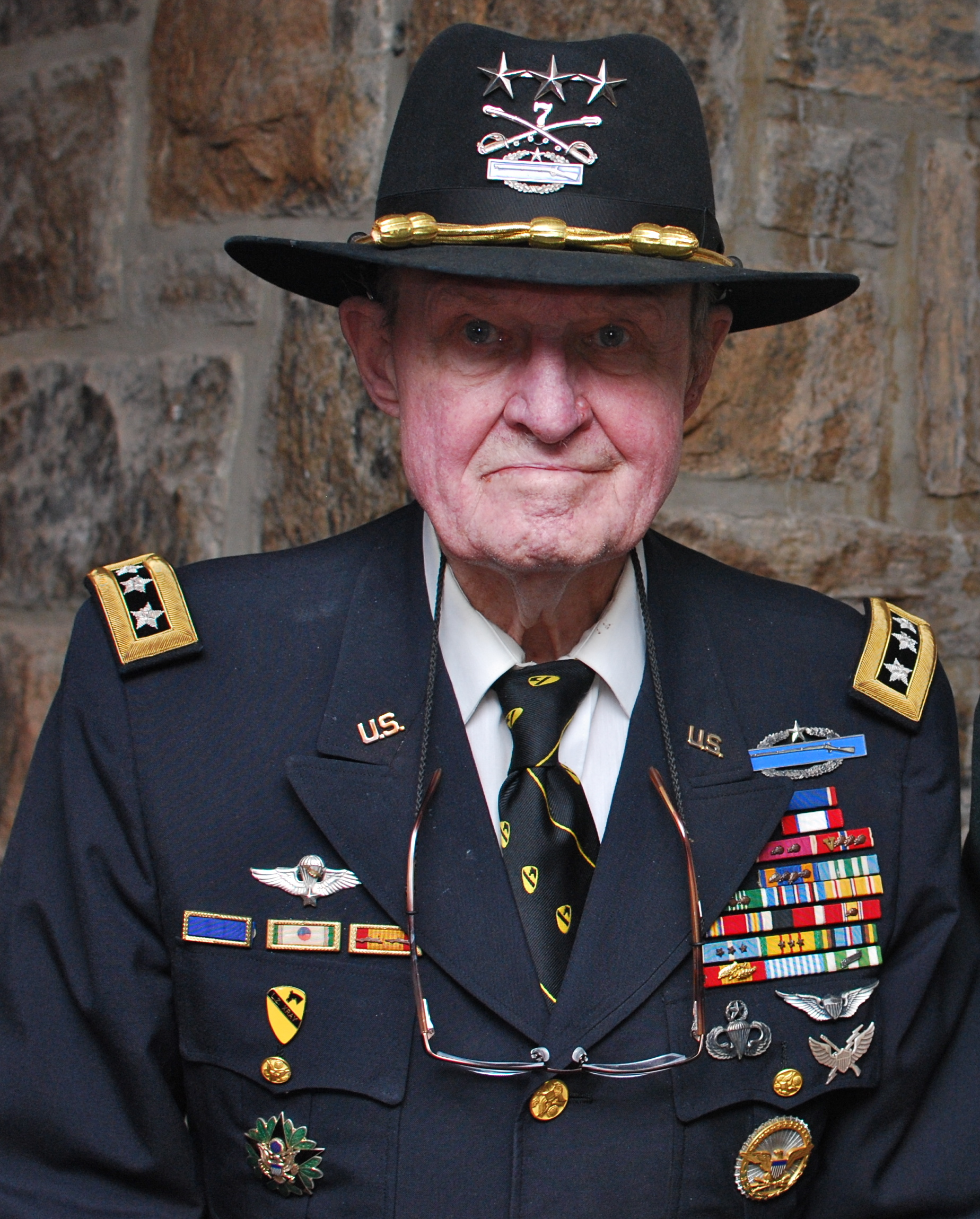
Moore at the United States Military Academy, May 2010

While assigned to Fort Bragg, Moore met Julia B. Compton, the daughter of Colonel and Mrs. Louis J. Compton. Julia was a student enrolled at the University of North Carolina at Chapel Hill, North Carolina and was visiting her parents at Fort Bragg. They were married at the Fort Bragg main post chapel on November 22, 1949. The Moores had five children, Greg Moore, Steve Moore, Julie Moore Orlowski, Cecile Moore Rainey, and David Moore, as well as twelve grandchildren. Two of their sons are career U.S. Army officers: one a retired colonel and another a retired lieutenant colonel.

After his retirement in 1977, Moore served as the Executive President of the Crested Butte Ski Area, Colorado. In June 2009, the 87-year-old Moore attended the opening of the National Infantry Museum in Columbus, Georgia. One of the featured exhibits of the museum is a life-size diorama of L.Z. X-Ray from the Battle of Ia Drang.

Moore died from a stroke on February 10, 2017, three days before his 95th birthday, in Auburn, Alabama. He was buried in Fort Benning Main Post Cemetery on February 17, 2017, with full military honors and laid to rest beside his wife of 55 years, who died in 2004.

== Bibliography ==
- In 1975, the United States Army Center of Military History published Building a Volunteer Army: The Fort Ord Contribution, by Moore and Lieutenant Colonel Jeff M. Tuten. The 139-page paperback is a monograph concerning the Project VOLAR experiments during Moore's tenure in command of Fort Ord in 1971–1973 in preparation for the end of the draft and the implementation of the Modern Volunteer Army.
- In 1992, Moore wrote We Were Soldiers Once… And Young with co-author Joseph L. Galloway. The book was adapted into the 2002 film We Were Soldiers, which was filmed at Forts Benning and Hunter Liggett, depicting Moore's command of 1st Battalion, 7th Cavalry, at Fort Benning and in the Battle of Ia Drang.
- Moore and Joseph L. Galloway wrote another book together, a follow-up to their first collaboration. We Are Soldiers Still; A Journey Back to the Battlefields of Vietnam was published in 2008. Moore and Galloway reunited to give an interview on the book at the Pritzker Military Museum & Library in September 2008.

== Awards and decorations ==
=== Purple Heart ===
While included in the list of awards, Moore never wore the Purple Heart and tried to return the award to the Army while in Vietnam and more formally in 1968. In his January 11, 1968, letter to the Army Adjutant General, he provided this rationale, "I have great respect for the Purple Heart Medal and would be proud to wear it if I consider it were fully earned by me in the future. In the case of this particular award, it was presented on the basis of a superficial "punji-stake" injury in Vietnam in October 1965. I do not feel that I earned the award for that slight injury and hence have never worn it, do not intend to, and request my records be set straight."

On January 16, 1968, the Adjutant General provided a formal response declining the request. The letter summarized, "General Orders pertaining to this award cannot be revoked. This award is part of your official records. It will be available to you in the future if you desire it."

=== List of awards and decorations ===
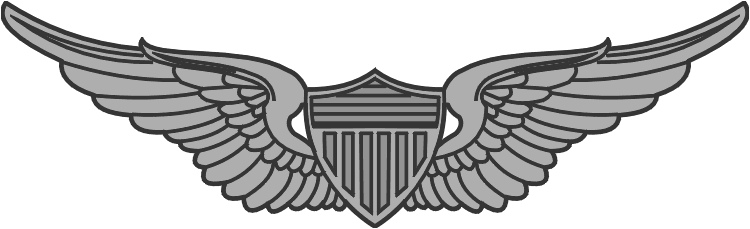

Badge	Combat Infantryman Badge w/ Star		
Badge	Basic Army Aviator Badge		
1st row	Army Distinguished Service Cross		Army Distinguished Service Medal
2nd row	Legion of Merit with two bronze oak leaf clusters	Bronze Star Medal with "V" Device and three bronze Oak Leaf Clusters (three awards for Valor)	Purple Heart
3rd row	Air Medal w/ eight Oak Leaf Clusters	Joint Service Commendation Medal	Army Commendation Medal w/ two Oak Leaf Clusters
4th row	American Campaign Medal	Asiatic-Pacific Campaign Medal	World War II Victory Medal
5th row	Army of Occupation Medal	National Defense Service Medal w/ one bronze 3/16" service stars	Korean Service Medal w/ three bronze 3/16" service stars
6th row	Armed Forces Expeditionary Medal	Vietnam Service Medal w/ three 3/16" bronze stars	Republic of Vietnam Gallantry Cross w/ three Palms
7th row	United Nations Korea Medal	Republic of Vietnam Campaign Medal w/ 1960– device	Republic of Korea War Service Medal

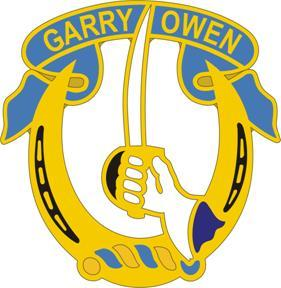
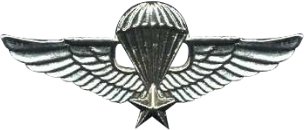

Badge	7th Cavalry Regiment Distinctive Unit Insignia	
Badge	Republic of Vietnam Parachutist Badge	
1st row	US Army Presidential Unit Citation	
2nd row	Republic of Korea Presidential Unit Citation	Republic of Vietnam Gallantry Cross Unit Citation (two awards)
Badge	1st Cavalry Division Combat Service Identification Badge	

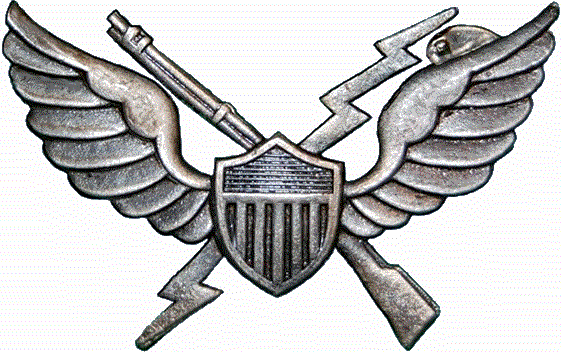

Badges	Master Parachutist Badge	Original Air Assault Badge (Unofficial)
Badges	Army Staff Identification Badge	Office of the Secretary of Defense Identification Badge

== Other recognition ==
- Order of Saint Maurice by the National Infantry Association
- Distinguished Graduate Award from the West Point Association of Graduates
- The Naming Commission recommended that Fort Benning be renamed Fort Moore, after Moore and his wife Julia Moore. This recommendation was accepted and Fort Benning was called Fort Moore between May 11, 2023, and March 3, 2025.
