= George R. Stotser =

United States Army general (1935–2022)

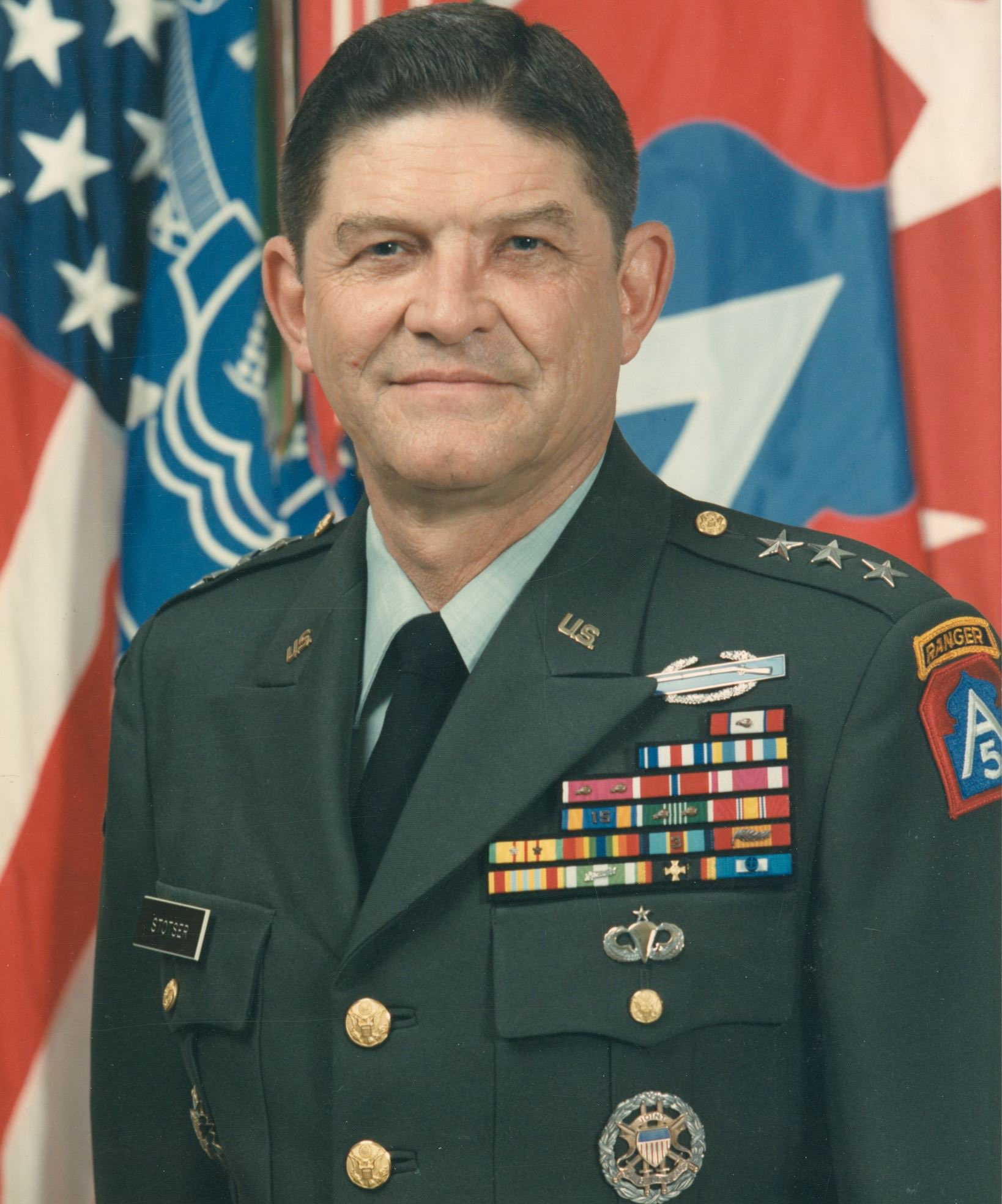
- Born: April 21, 1935; Lawrenceburg, Tennessee, U.S.
- Died: July 1, 2022 (aged 87); Columbus, Georgia, U.S.
- Burial place: Fort Benning Main Post Cemetery
- Military career
- Allegiance: United States
- Branch: United States Army
- Service years: 1955–1991
- Rank: Lieutenant General
- Commands: Fifth United States Army; 3rd Infantry Division; 3rd Brigade, 2nd Armored Division; 1st Brigade, 1st Armored Division; 1st Battalion, 12th Cavalry, 1st Cavalry Division
- Conflicts: Vietnam War
- Awards: Distinguished Service Medal (3); Silver Star Medal; Defense Superior Service Medal; Legion of Merit (3); Bronze Star Medal; Meritorious Service Medal; Air Medal (15)

George Raymond Stotser (April 21, 1935 – July 1, 2022) was a retired lieutenant general in the United States Army. Commands he held include the Fifth United States Army and Fort Sam Houston, the 3rd Infantry Division, the 3rd Brigade, 2nd Armored Division (Forward), Deputy Chief of Staff for Operations, United States Army Europe, and Deputy Commander in Chief, United States Army Europe.

Stotser was born in Lawrenceburg, Tennessee and attended Middle Tennessee State University, where he participated in the Army ROTC program. He enlisted in the Army on January 25, 1955 and was commissioned as a second lieutenant of infantry in 1956 upon graduation with a B.S. degree in biology. Stotser completed the Basic Infantry Officer Course at the Army Infantry School in February 1957 and the Advanced Course in May 1963. He then completed the Naval Command and Staff Course at the Naval War College in June 1966. Stotser earned an M.S. degree in education from Middle Tennessee State in June 1971 and graduated from the United States Army War College in June 1972.

Stotser was deployed to Europe multiple times during his career. He also served two combat tours in Vietnam with the 1st Cavalry Division (Airmobile), the second as commander of the 1st Battalion, 12th Cavalry Regiment in 1969. Stotser retired from active duty on July 31, 1991.

After his death, Stotser was buried at the Fort Benning Main Post Cemetery on July 15, 2022.
