= Order of Saint Maurice (United States) =

Award presented by the National Infantry Association

Order of Saint Maurice (OSM) was established in 1996 to recognize the significant contributions made by Infantrymen, Infantry supporters, and spouses. The concept was designed in the pattern of the Cavalry & Armor Association's Order of St. George Medallion and is awarded by the National Infantry Association (NIA) and the Chief of Infantry of the United States Army. It is named after Saint Maurice, the leader of the Roman Theban Legion in the 3rd century.

== Levels ==
The Order of Saint Maurice has six levels. A nominee for the Order of Saint Maurice must have served the Infantry community with distinction; must have demonstrated a significant contribution in support of the Infantry; and must represent the highest standards of integrity, moral character, professional competence, and dedication to duty. The same medallion is used for each level, with an attachment that identifies the level. Active and Reserve Component nominees must be members of the NIA.

- Primicerius – The highest level, for those who have made a significant and lasting contribution to the entire Infantry with a special version of the award going to the Infantry Doughboy Award winners each year. Must be or have been Infantry Branch.
- Centurion – For middle level, brigade and battalion officers and NCOs, and special nominees, for an outstanding contribution to the Infantry. Most recent MOS must be or have been (Retired) Infantry Branch.
- Legionnaire – Exclusively for Infantrymen, this award recognizes outstanding or conspicuous contribution to the Infantry by an Infantryman.
- Civis – For civilian personnel who have supported the U.S. Infantry.
- Peregrinus – For foreign military personnel who have served in or supported the U.S. Infantry.
- Cohort – For young Officers and Non-Commissioned Officers who have demonstrated excellence in performance and significantly contributed to their Infantry Battalion’s success. This award is an initial foundation for Infantrymen for future awarding of the Legionnaire, Centurion, and Primicerius levels of the Order of Saint Maurice. Additionally, Soldiers of other branches and servicemen from other US Armed Services are eligible for this level.

=== Shield of Sparta – Heroine of the Infantry ===
The Shield of Sparta is awarded by the National Infantry Association and the Chief of Infantry to a spouse who has contributed significantly to the Infantry. The NIA’s goal is to recognize spouses of Infantrymen and other Soldiers in support roles, whose contributions deserve special recognition by the NIA and the Infantry community. The award is a token of appreciation for the sacrifice and commitment demanded of the spouses and supporters of Infantrymen and other Soldiers. It further symbolizes these individuals as true patriots with selfless ideals and the courage to send their Soldier into harm’s way.

== Namesake ==
Saint Maurice was Primicerius of the Theban Legion. In 287 AD it marched in service of the Roman Empire fighting against the revolt in the Berguadae Gauls. His men were composed entirely of Christians recruited from upper Egypt, near the Valley of the Kings. The Legion marched to the Mediterranean Sea, was transported across, and traveled across Italy to an area in Switzerland. Serving under Augustus Maximian Hercules, better known to history as Maximian, Maurice was ordered to have his legionnaires offer pagan sacrifices before battle near the Rhone at Martigny. The Theban Legion refused to participate, and also refused to kill innocent civilians in the conduct of their duty, and withdrew to the town of Agaunum. Enraged, Maximian ordered every tenth man killed, yet they still refused. A second time the General ordered Maurice’s men to participate and again they refused. Maurice declared his earnest desire to obey every order lawful in the eyes of God. “We have seen our comrades killed,” came the reply. “Rather than sorrow, we rejoice at the honor done to them.” At this Maximian ordered the butchery of the Thebans and the martyrdom of Saint Maurice. September 22 is the traditional feast day."

== Notable recipients ==
- Abizaid, John P. – General (Primicerius, 2000)
- Bolger, Daniel P. – Lieutenant General (Centurion, 2000)
- Cashe, Alwyn C. – Sergeant First Class and Medal of Honor recipient (Primicerius, 2022)
- Connelly, William A. – 6th Sergeant Major of the Army, Doughboy Award 2004 (Primicerius, 2004)
- Dailey, Daniel A. – 15th Sergeant Major of the Army (Primicerius, 2015)
- Dye, Dale A. Jr. – USMC Captain and actor (Legionnaire, 2003)
- Galloway, Joseph L. – news reporter and war correspondent (Civis, 2000)
- Houtsma, Gary – DoD mechanical engineer, awarded for leading the team that developed the Picatinny rail (Civis, 2014)
- Kristoffersen, Eirik – Chief of Defence, Norway (Peregrinus, 2015)
- Meyer, Edward C. – U.S. Army Chief of Staff, Doughboy Award 2011 (Primicerius, 1999)
- Moore, Harold G. – Lieutenant General, Doughboy Award 2000 (Primicerius, 2000)
- Perot, Ross H. – U.S. Navy Lieutenant, Doughboy Award 1996 (Primicerius, 1996)
- Petry, Leroy A., Master Sergeant and Medal of Honor recipient (Centurion, 2014)
- Plumley, Basil L. – Command Sergeant Major, Doughboy Award 1999 (Primicerius, 1999)
- Powell, Colin L. – General and former Secretary of State, Doughboy Award 1998 (Primicerius, 1998)
- Puckett, Ralph Jr. – Colonel and Medal of Honor recipient, Doughboy Award 2007 (Primicerius, 1997)
- Sinese, Gary – Actor, Doughboy Award 2015 (Civis, 2015)
- Sullivan, Gordon R. – General and namesake for the Sullivan Cup Gunnery Competition (Legionnaire, 1998)

== Gallery ==
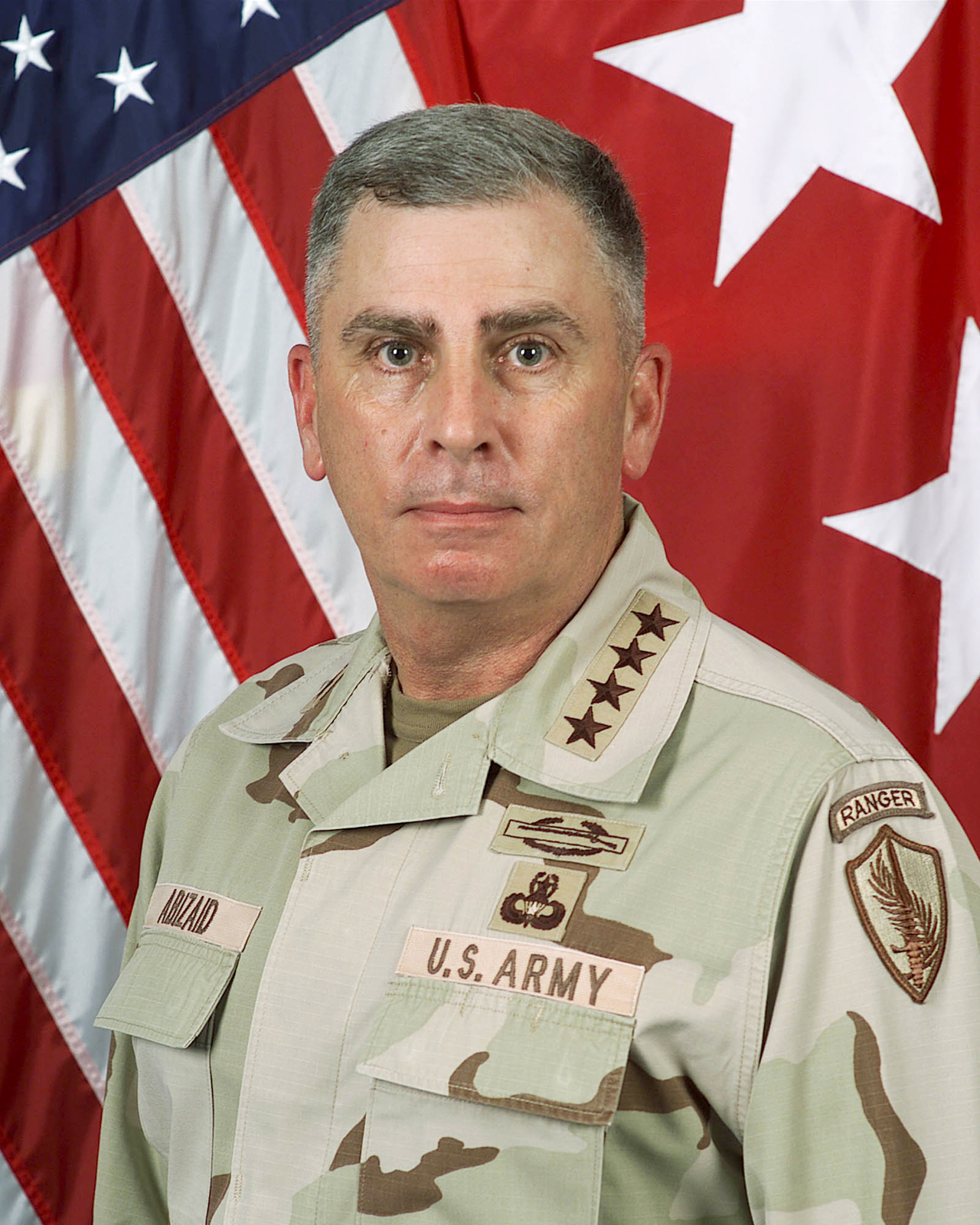
John P. Abizaid, general, U.S. Army (2007)

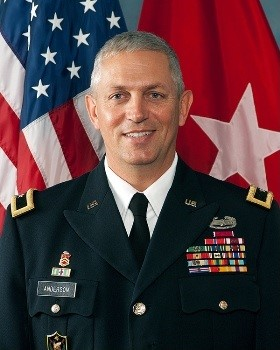
Mark E. Anderson, major general, U.S. Army (2007)

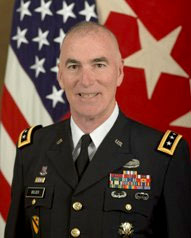
Daniel P. Bolger, lieutenant general, U.S. Army (2013)

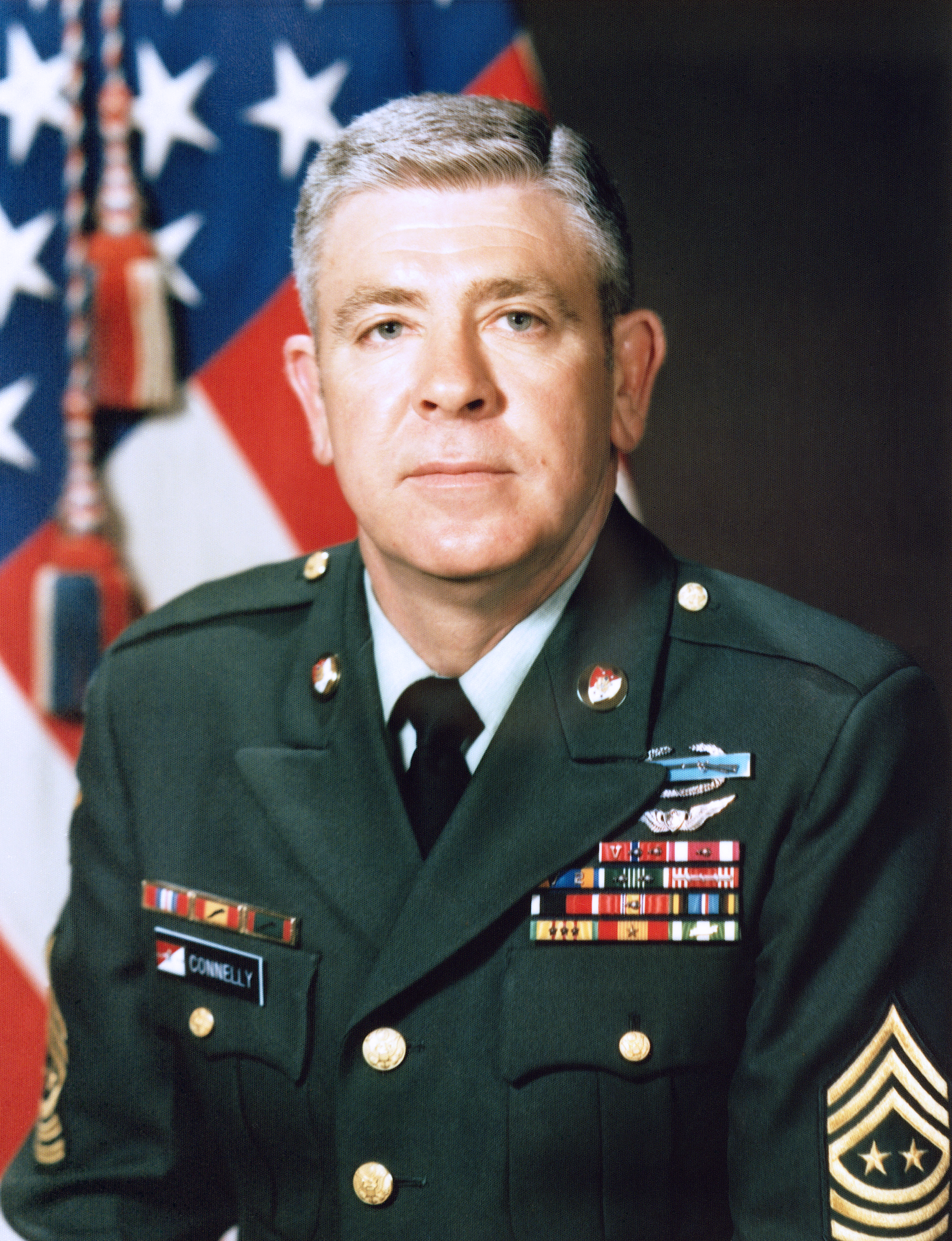
William A. Connelly, 6th sergeant major of the army (1979)

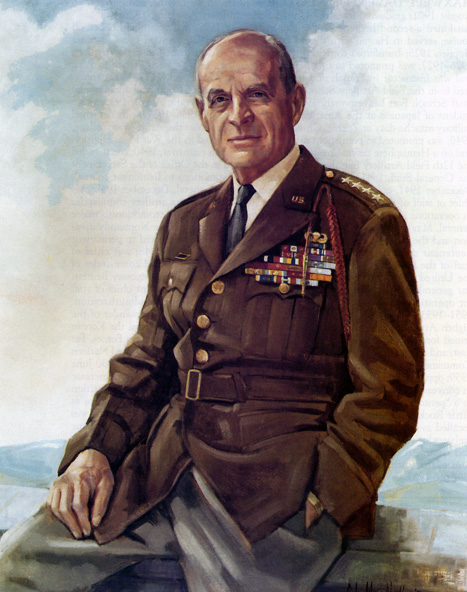
Matthew Ridgway, general, U.S. Army (1955)

Ross Perot, lieutenant, U.S. Navy (1957)

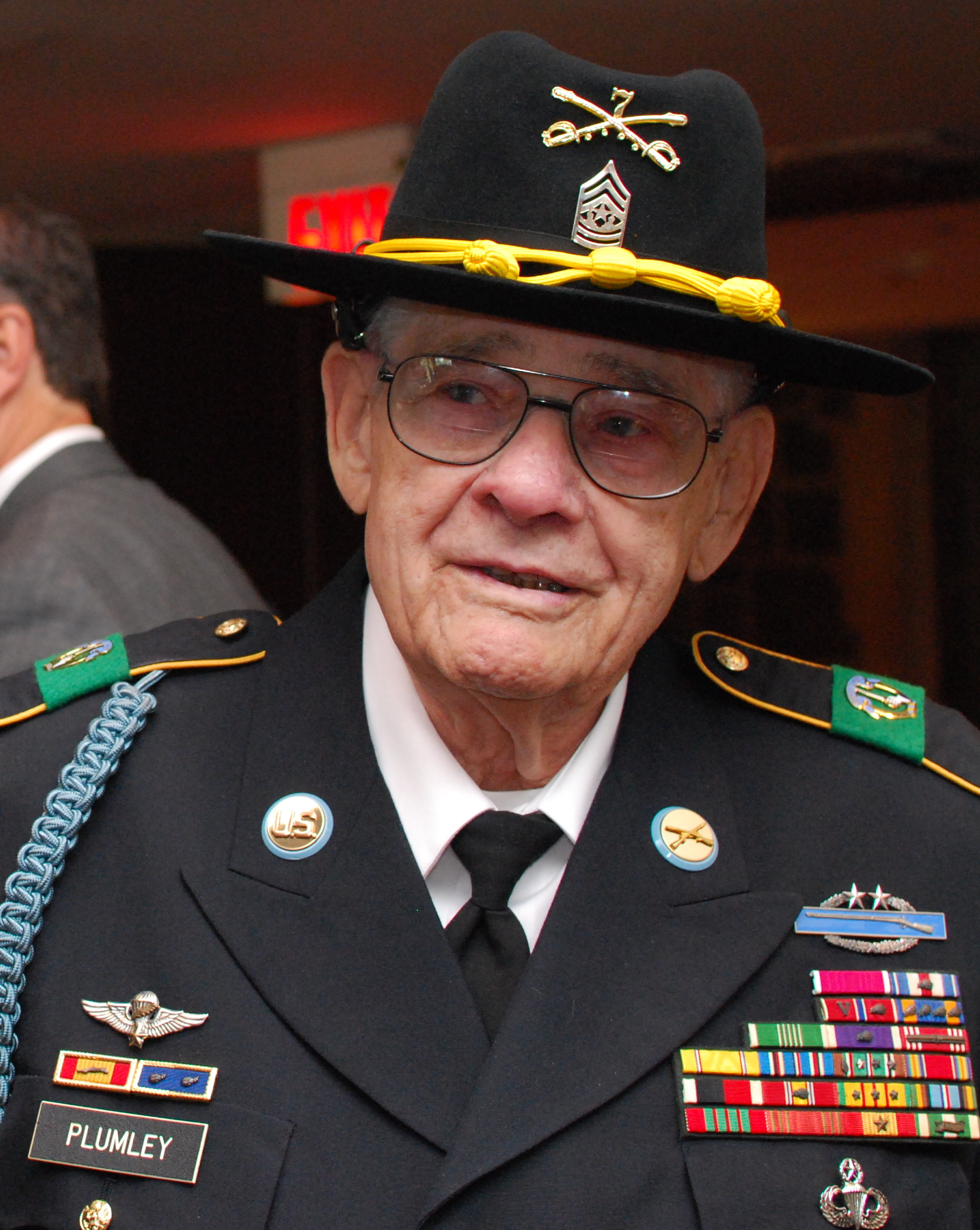
Basil L. Plumley, command sergeant major, U.S. Army (1974)

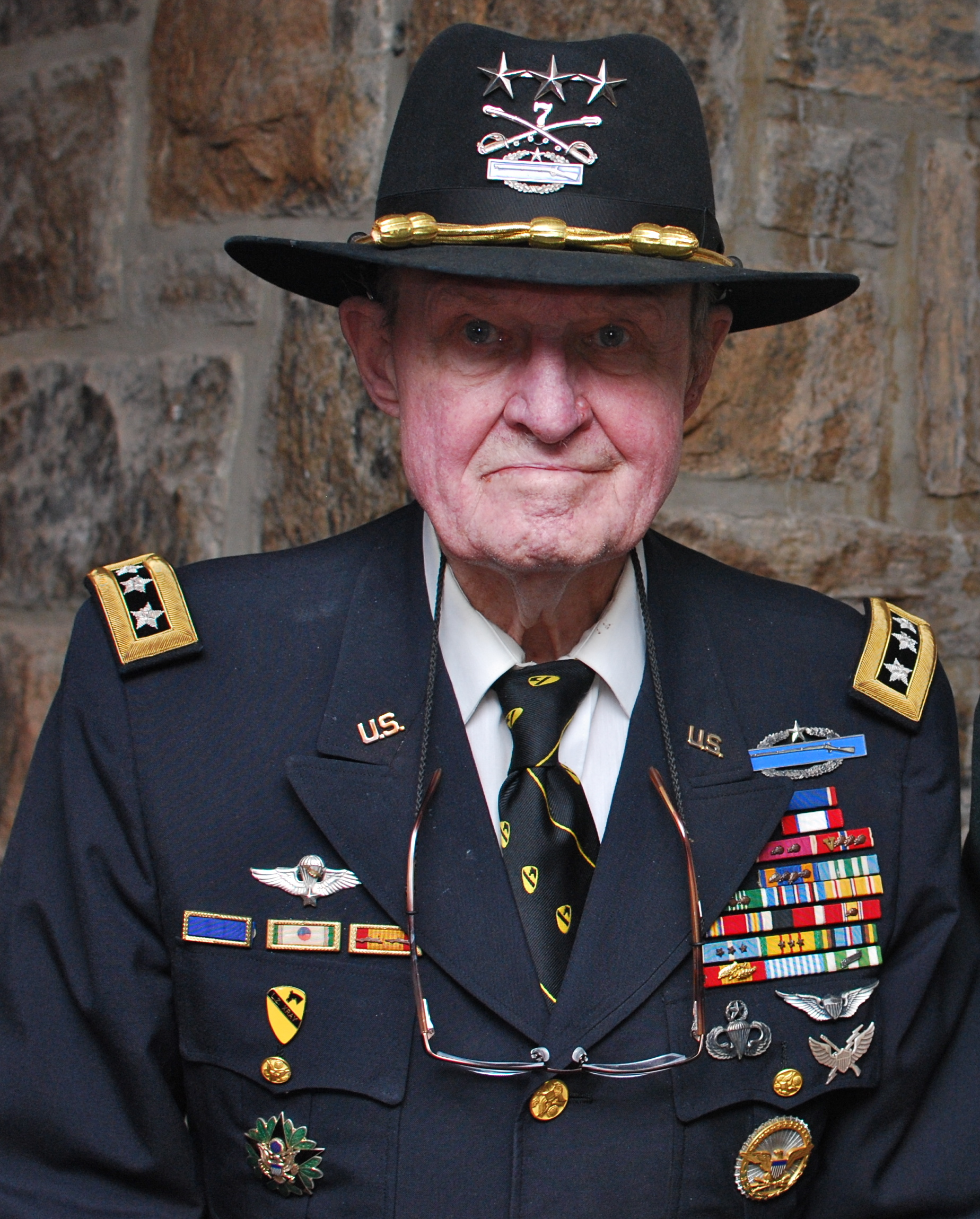
Harold Gregory Moore, Jr., lieutenant general, U.S. Army (1977)

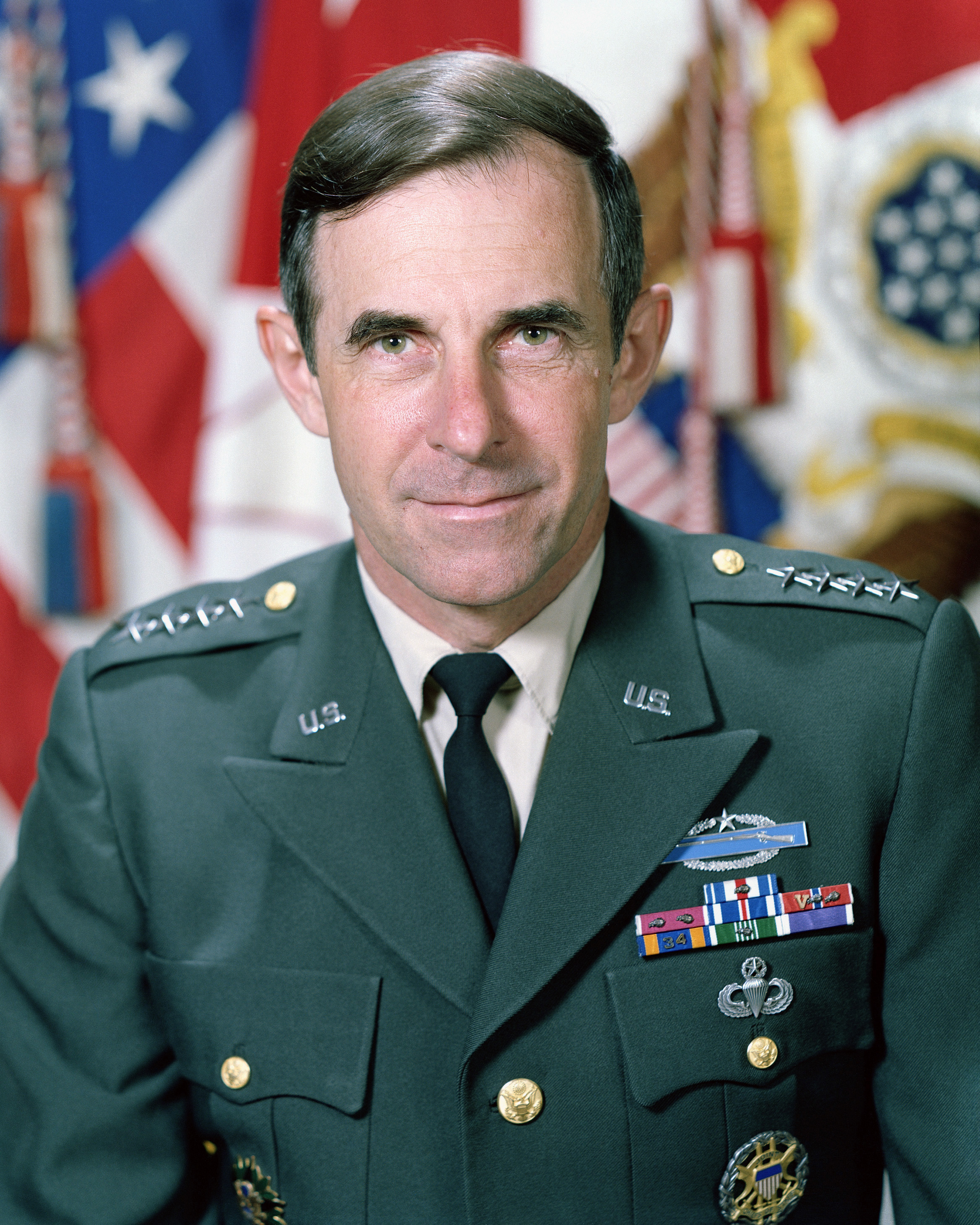
Edward Charles Meyer, general, U.S. Army (1983)

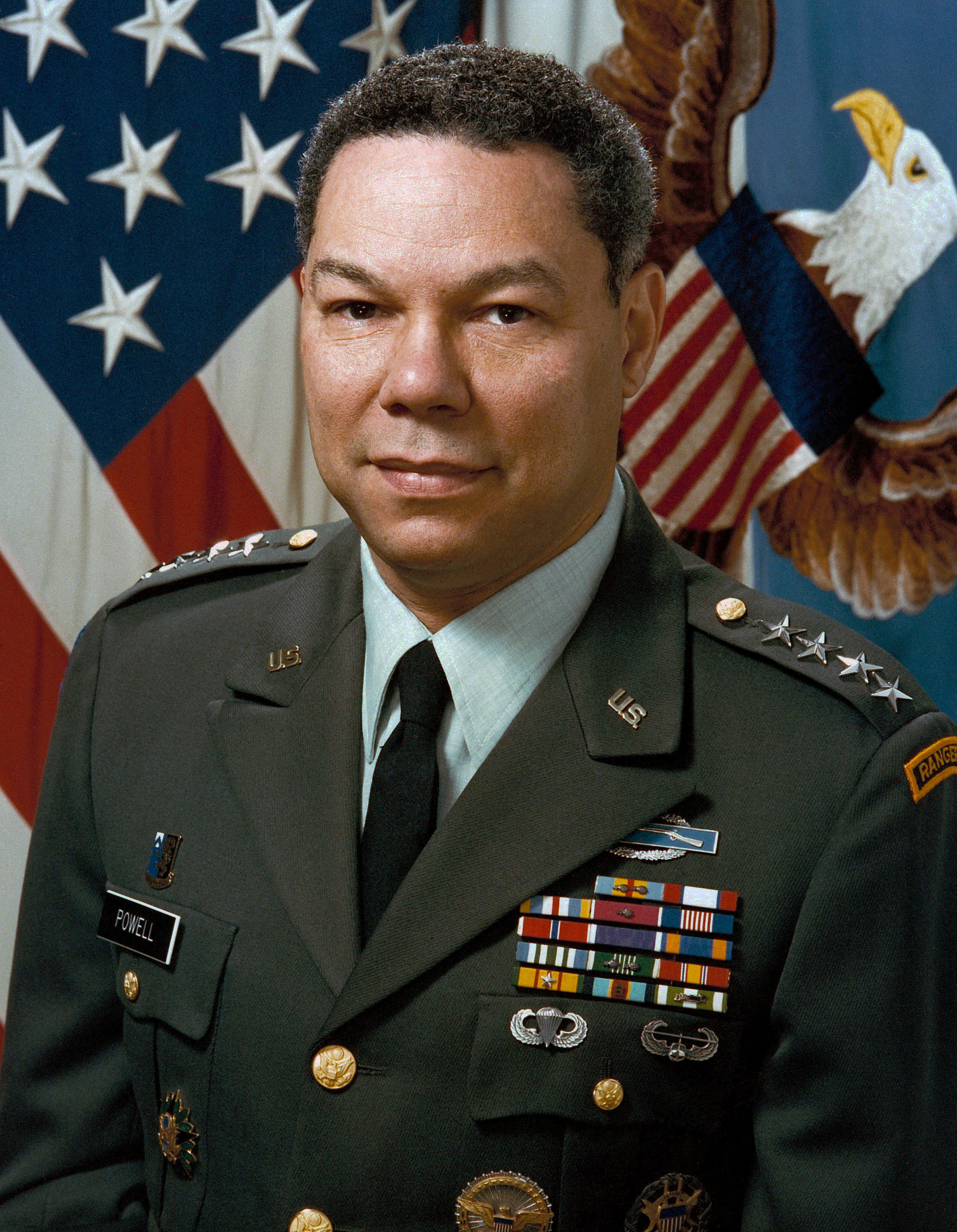
Colin Powell, general, U.S. Army (1993)

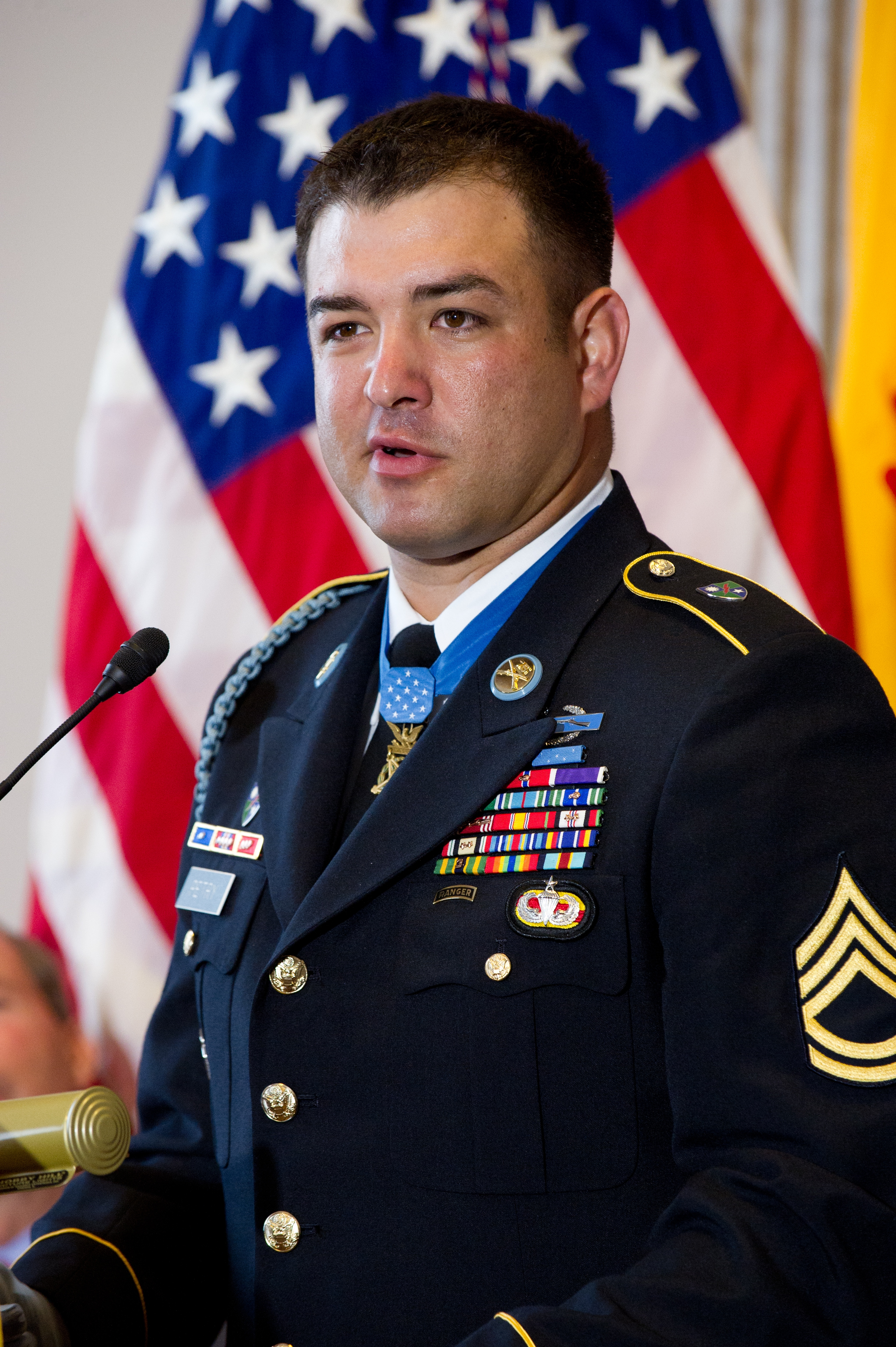
Leroy Arthur Petry, master sergeant, U.S. Army (2011)

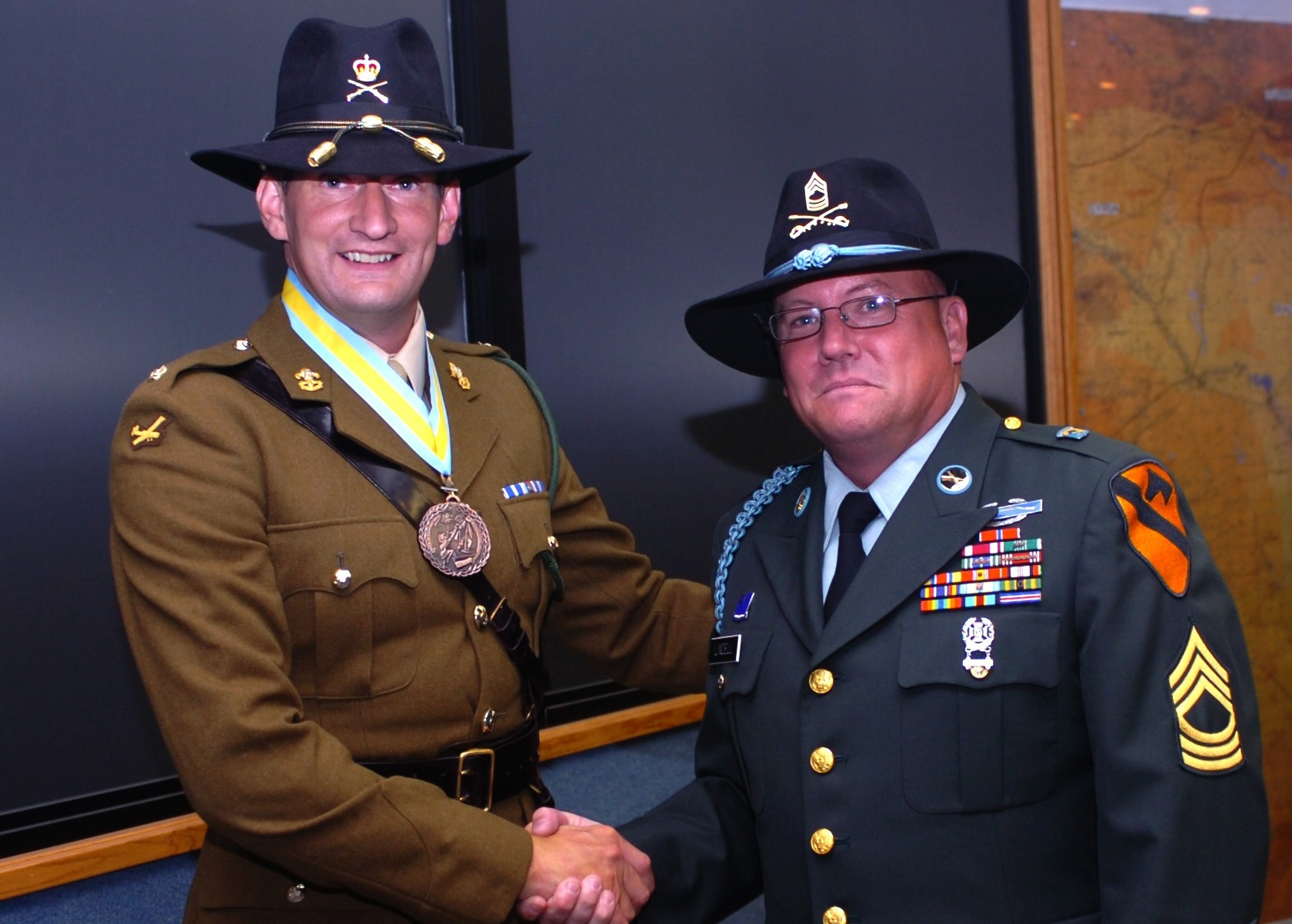
John Russell, major, U.K. Army, chief of operations, 1st Cav. Div. (2014)

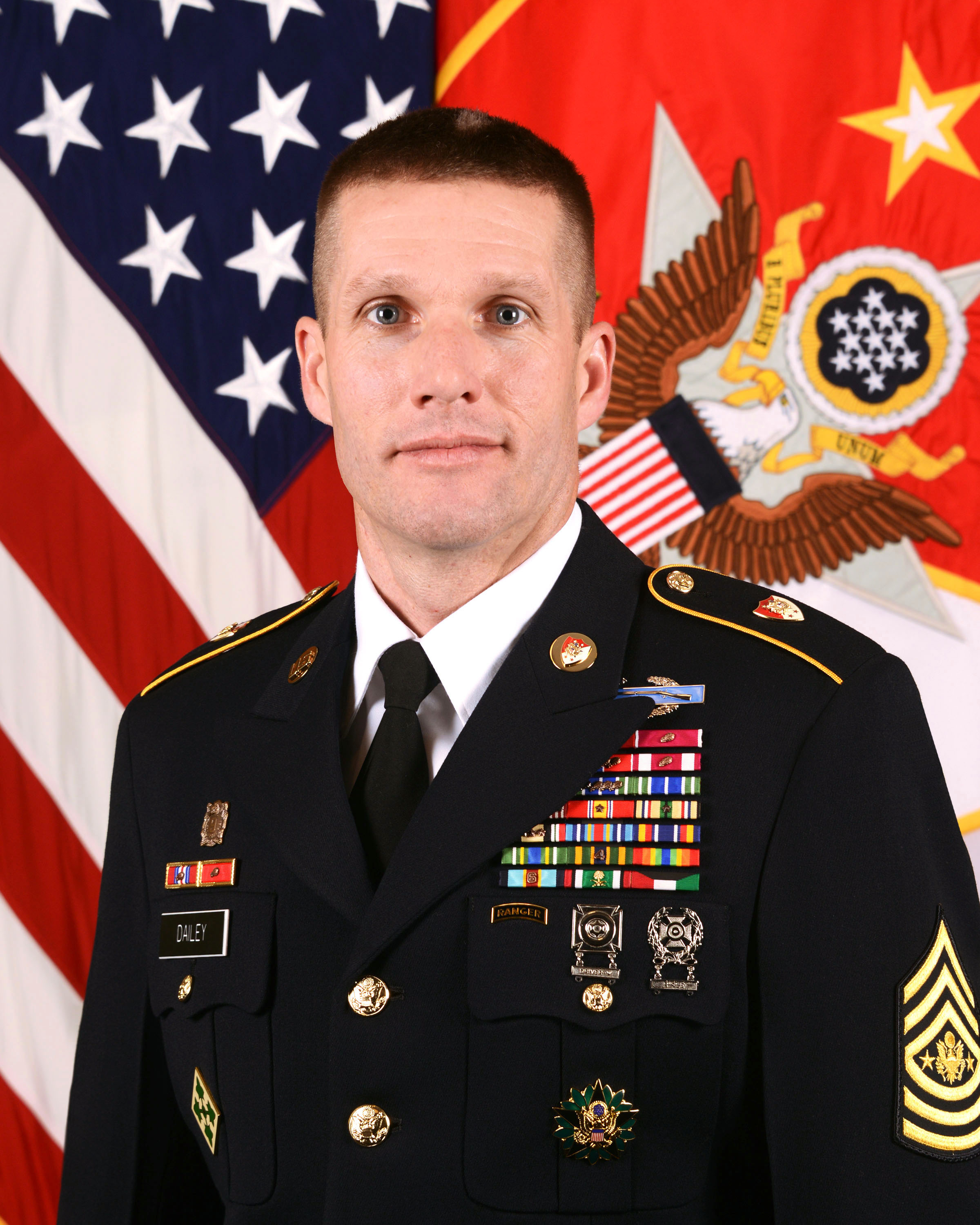
Daniel A. Dailey, 15th sergeant major of the army (2015)

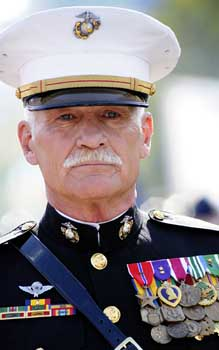
Dale A. Dye Jr., captain, U.S. Marine Corps
