= Sam Wetzel =

United States Army general (1930–2022)

Robert L. Wetzel
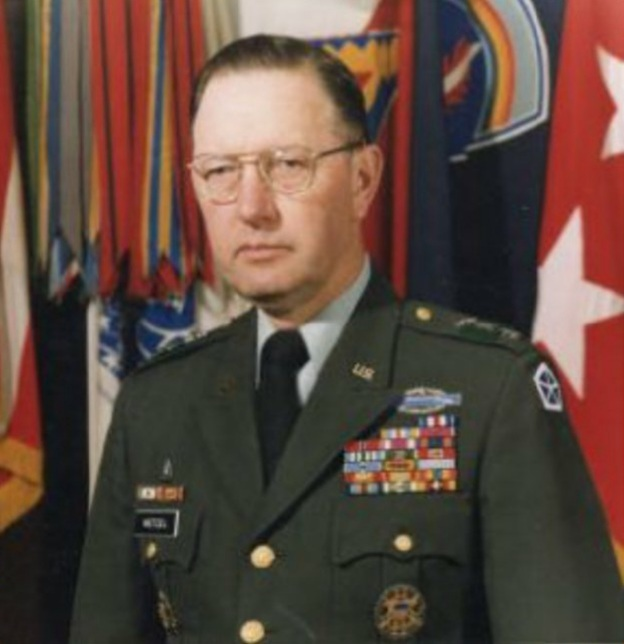
- Wetzel in the 1980s
- Born: October 6, 1930; Clarksburg, West Virginia, U.S.
- Died: January 20, 2022 (aged 91); Columbus, Georgia, U.S.
- Burial place: Fort Benning Main Post Cemetery
- Military career
- Allegiance: United States
- Branch: United States Army
- Service years: 1952–1986
- Rank: Lieutenant General
- Nickname: Sam
- Commands: V Corps; Fort Benning; 4th Battalion, 31st Infantry Division
- Conflicts: Korean War; Vietnam War
- Awards: Army Distinguished Service Medal; Silver Star Medal; Joint Superior Service Medal; Legion of Merit (2); Bronze Star Medal; Meritorious Service Medal; Air Medal (7)

Robert Lewis Wetzel (October 6, 1930 – January 20, 2022) was a United States Army lieutenant general.

== Education ==
Robert Lewis "Sam" Wetzel, of Clarksburg, West Virginia, graduated from high school in 1948 and was planning to study engineering at Purdue University. Instead he chose the opportunity to attend the United States Military Academy at West Point.

Wetzel earned a B.S. degree from the Military Academy in 1952 and an M.B.A. degree from George Washington University in 1966. He graduated from the Infantry School Advanced Course in 1959, the Air Command and Staff School in 1966 and the Army War College in 1970.

== Military service ==
Wetzel was commissioned from West Point in 1952 as an infantry officer. He was immediately deployed to the Korean War, where he saw action as a company commander.

In 1961, Captain Wetzel was the aide of Major General William Westmoreland, then Superintendent of the United States Military Academy. He also commanded a mechanized infantry company in Germany.

Lieutenant Colonel Wetzel was deployed to South Vietnam in 1968 as the commander of the 4th Battalion, 31st Infantry Regiment (United States), the "Polar Bears". After an enemy bullet nicked him on the forehead, he declined a Purple Heart, judging the wound too insignificant to mention, despite the fact that it left him with a permanent scar.

Returning from the front, Wetzel eventually married an American Vietnam widow with five young children. He was promoted to colonel and soon assumed command of a brigade in Fort Carson, Colorado. In 1975, he was promoted to brigadier general and sent to West Germany.

He then began a rapid ascent. He was given command of the First Infantry Division (forward) in Goppingen, West Germany. When this command concluded, the commander of all European and American forces in Europe, General Alexander Haig, then personally pinned Wetzel's second star on him.

From 1978-79, Wetzel served as Haig's chief-of-staff in Belgium. Just before Wetzel's arrival at Haig's office, the Soviets had deployed their SS-20 theater nuclear missiles in eastern Europe. This upset the entire balance of NATO deterrence and Western security. During this year together, Haig, Wetzel and the rest of the staff crafted what became the West's strategic response - deployment in western Europe of the Pershing II missiles, which could hit Moscow in the event of war, allowing only minutes for the Soviets to react. During the next four years domestic political battles began in NATO countries as to whether the Pershing II missiles would actually be deployed.

After serving as Haig's Chief of Staff, Wetzel commanded the Third Infantry Division in Würzburg. Wetzel led his division to victory in the annual war games staged in West Germany.

In 1981, Wetzel was diagnosed with terminal melanoma cancer. He was given less than a year to live, and offered a full medical disability in exchange for retirement. Wetzel refused. The Army reluctantly permitted him to stay on, but only after he signed a full waiver. Judging Wetzel to be at death's door, the Army sent him back to the United States. However, he made a full recovery. He was soon placed in command of the infantry training center in Fort Benning, Georgia. In 1983, Wetzel was promoted to lieutenant general and he returned to the troops in West Germany.

Wetzel's first position back in Germany was Deputy Commander in Chief of U.S. Forces in Europe. The NATO allies had finally approved the Pershing II plan. Immediately upon his arrival, it became Wetzel's job to receive and deploy the Pershing II missiles in the midst of anti-war demonstrations all over Europe. Today, Cold War historians (relying on the candid confessions of defeated Russian leaders) credit the deployment of the Pershing II missiles as one of three key factors that broke the Soviets' back and ended the Cold War (the other two being the Reagan defense build-up and SDI specifically).

In 1986, Colin Powell succeeded him in command of V Corps in Frankfurt, West Germany. That was Wetzel's last assignment before retirement.

== Death and burial ==
Wetzel died on January 20, 2022. He was interred at Fort Benning Main Post Cemetery on January 28, 2022, the 19th general officer to be buried there.

== Awards and decorations ==
Wetzel's awards include the Distinguished Service Medal, Silver Star, Joint Superior Service Medal, two Legion of Merits, Bronze Star, Meritorious Service Medal, seven Air Medals and Combat Infantryman's Badge with Star.
