= Marcus B. Bell =

U.S. Army brigadier general (1893–1981)

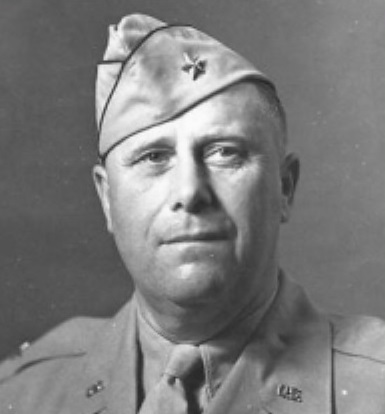
- Bell as a brigadier general, circa 1950
- Born: February 22, 1893; Fredonia, Kansas, U.S.
- Died: May 18, 1981 (aged 88); Tucson, Arizona, U.S.
- Burial place: Fort Benning Main Post Cemetery
- Education: University of Missouri
- Spouse: Irma Elizabeth Dumas (m. 1918; died 1978)
- Children: 2
- Military career
- Allegiance: United States
- Branch: United States Army
- Service years: 1916–1917 (National Guard); 1917–1951 (Army)
- Rank: Sergeant (National Guard); Brigadier General (Army)
- Service number: 06616
- Unit: U.S. Army Infantry Branch
- Commands: Company H, 50th Infantry Regiment; Illinois District, Civilian Conservation Corps; 10th Mountain Division
- Conflicts: Pancho Villa Expedition; World War I American Forces in Germany; World War II; Occupation of Japan; Division of Korea
- Awards: Silver Star; Legion of Merit (2)

Marcus B. Bell (February 22, 1893 – May 18, 1981) was a career officer in the United States Army. A veteran of the Pancho Villa Expedition, World War I and World War II, he attained the rank of brigadier general and was a recipient of the Silver Star and two awards of the Legion of Merit. Bell was most notable for his service as assistant division commander of the 81st Infantry Division during the Second World War and his post-war command of the 10th Mountain Division.

A native of Fredonia, Kansas, Bell graduated from the University of Missouri in 1916. He served with the Missouri National Guard in 1916 and 1917, including active duty during the Pancho Villa Expedition. In 1917, he applied for a commission in the Army as it expanded for World War I and was appointed a second lieutenant of Infantry. He was assigned to the 50th Infantry Regiment, and served in the United States and then performed overseas duty with the American Forces in Germany.

After the war, Bell continued to rise through the ranks in positions of increasing rank and responsibility. He graduated from the United States Army Command and General Staff College in 1934, and later commanded the Illinois District of the Civilian Conservation Corps. At the start of World War II, he graduated from the United States Army War College, then served as chief of staff for the 80th Infantry Division. He was subsequently promoted to brigadier general and assigned as assistant division commander of the 81st Infantry Division during combat in the Pacific Ocean theater. After the war, Bell served in the Occupation of Japan, then carried out a two-year assignment as deputy chief of staff of the XXIV Corps in South Korea.

In 1950, Bell was assigned as assistant division commander of the 10th Mountain Division, and he became the division commander in 1951. Bell retired from the Army at the end of 1951. In retirement, he resided in Columbus, Georgia. Bell died in Tucson, Arizona on May 18, 1981. He was buried at Fort Benning's Main Post Cemetery.

== Early life ==
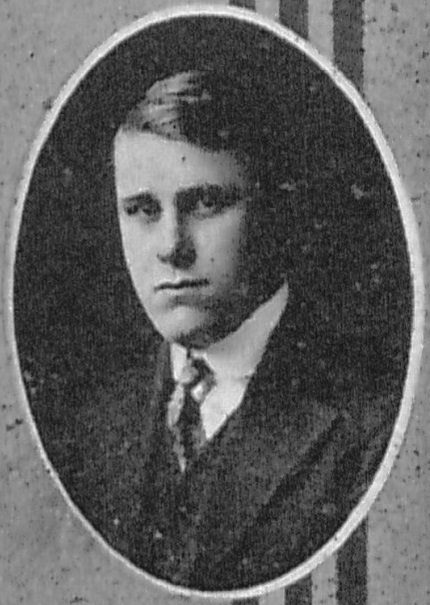
Bell as a University of Missouri student in 1915

Marcus Brenneman Bell was born in Fredonia, Kansas on February 22, 1893, the son of Miller Myers Bell and Clara (Brenneman) Bell. He was raised in Carthage, Missouri and was a 1912 graduate of Carthage High School. Bell attended the University of Missouri, from which he graduated in 1916 with a Bachelor of Science degree in agriculture. Bell was active in the college's corps of cadets during all four years of his schooling and he attained the rank of major. In addition, Bell joined the Phi Gamma Delta fraternity's Chi Mu chapter and was a member of Scabbard and Blade.

In July 1916, Bell joined the Missouri National Guard as a private in Company F, 4th Infantry Regiment. He was soon promoted to sergeant in Company H, and he continued to serve with the National Guard until he was discharged so he could accept a commission in the United States Army. Following his unit's activation for federal service in 1916, Bell served on the Mexico–United States border in Texas during the Pancho Villa Expedition.

== World War I ==
In August 1917, Bell received his commission in the United States Army as a second lieutenant of Infantry. With the Army's expansion during World War I increasing the demand for officers, Bell was promoted to temporary first lieutenant on the same day. He served as a temporary captain from June 1918 to June 1920.

After completing his initial training with the 4th Provisional Officers' Training Battalion at Fort Leavenworth, Kansas, Bell was assigned to the 50th Infantry Regiment. In 1918, he served as the regimental adjutant while the unit completed organization and training at Fort Meade, Maryland.

Later in 1918, Bell commanded Company H, 50th Infantry, a unit of the 20th Division, at Camp Sevier, South Carolina. The division was intended to be a base and training division, but the Armistice of November 11, 1918 ended the war before it became fully operational. The 50th Infantry was relieved from assignment to the 20th Division in February 1919 and performed post-war occupation duty as a unit of 2nd Brigade, American Forces in Germany, and Bell served in Germany with his regiment.

== Post-World War I ==
Bell returned to his permanent rank of first lieutenant in June 1920, but was promoted to permanent captain a month later. In 1923, Bell was assigned as assistant professor of military science for the Reserve Officers' Training Corps at Lehigh University. In 1925, he graduated from the company officer's course at the Fort Benning Infantry School. Afterwards, he was assigned to duty with the 21st Infantry Regiment at Schofield Barracks, Hawaii.

In 1928, Bell returned to the mainland United States and was assigned as an instructor and advisor with the Minnesota National Guard. In addition, Bell also served as the Army's inspector for units of the North Dakota National Guard.

Bell was selected for attendance at the United States Army Command and General Staff College in 1932. He began the course in 1933 and graduated in 1934. Prior to beginning the staff college program of instruction, Bell was assigned to duty with the Civilian Conservation Corps and helped establish the camp in Wendling, Oregon. After graduating, Bell was assigned as an instructor at the Infantry School. He was promoted to major in August 1935.

In 1938, Bell was assigned to the 6th Infantry at the Jefferson Barracks Military Post. In 1939, he was assigned as executive officer of the Civilian Conservation Corps' Jefferson Barracks District. Bell subsequently commanded the Civilian Conservation Corps in Illinois, with headquarters first in Rushville, and later in Decatur. He was promoted to lieutenant colonel on August 7, 1940.

== World War II ==
In March 1941, Bell was assigned to staff duty as mobilization officer for the Fifth Corps Area at Fort Hayes, Ohio. Later in 1941, Bell graduated from the United States Army War College. Afterwards, he was reassigned to the staff of General Headquarters, United States Army (GHQ), and helped plan and execute the Carolina Maneuvers, simulated combat which permitted Army senior leaders to evaluate leaders, equipment, doctrine, and tactics as the Army prepared to enter World War II.

Bell was promoted to colonel in January 1942. Soon afterwards, he was assigned as chief of staff of the 80th Infantry Division, which was organizing and training at Camp Forrest, Tennessee. In December 1942, Bell was promoted to brigadier general and assigned as assistant division commander of the 81st Infantry Division at Camp Rucker, Alabama.

The 81st Division subsequently relocated to Camp Beale, California to complete its training before departing for combat overseas. After arriving in the Pacific Ocean theater, the 81st Division took part in numerous campaigns and battles, including the Battle of Kwajalein, Battle of Angaur, Battle of Peleliu, Battle of Leyte, and Battle of Luzon. His wartime heroism was recognized with award of the Silver Star and Legion of Merit. According to news accounts, the details of Bell's Silver Star citation for actions during the Battle of Angaur read:

"Shortly after dark September 18, 1944, Gen. Bell proceeded on a voluntary mission through an area in which enemy patrols were known to be operating in order to expedite the delivery of division orders to the regimental commander for the attack the following day. Throughout the two days which followed he accompanied forward elements of the regiment in the attack, frequently exposing himself to hostile fire in order to confer with and advise junior leaders."

== Post-World War II ==
After the Surrender of Japan in early September 1945, Bell continued to serve with the 81st Infantry Division as it performed post-war occupation duty. In 1946 he returned to the permanent rank of colonel. He served for two years as deputy chief of staff for the XXIV Corps which was based in South Korea following the Japanese occupation of Korea and its division at the 38th parallel. His service in Korea was recognized with a second award of the Legion of Merit.

In October 1950, he was again promoted to brigadier general. After his promotion, Bell was appointed as assistant division commander of the 10th Mountain Division, which had been reorganized after World War II as a basic training unit at Fort Riley, Kansas. In May 1951, he was appointed division commander. Bell commanded the 10th Mountain Division until retiring in November 1951.

== Retirement and death ==
In retirement, Bell was a resident of Columbus, Georgia. He took part in local civic and business causes, including founding the National Bank of Fort Benning in 1956. He participated in veteran' reunions and other commemorative activities, including the dedication of monument to the 81st Infantry Division at Fort Rucker in 1959. In July 1961, Bell spoke at the dedication of a monument honoring Confederate and Union veterans of the American Civil War which was placed at the Jasper County, Missouri courthouse in his former hometown of Carthage. Bell was also involved in Columbus-area charities, including the March of Dimes. In 1969, Bell was foreman of a Muscogee County, Georgia grand jury that investigated claims of police department dysfunction in Columbus.

Bell died in Tucson, Arizona on May 18, 1981. He was buried at Fort Benning's Main Post Cemetery.

== Family ==
In March 1918, Bell married Irma Elizabeth Dumas of Columbia, Missouri. She was a 1916 graduate of the University of Missouri and worked as a schoolteacher and principal. In 1919, the Bells became parents of twin daughters, Martha Jane and Marjorie.
