= We Were Soldiers Once...and Young =

Book by Harold G. Moore and Joseph L. Galloway

We Were Soldiers Once… and Young
- First edition cover, featuring Lt. Rick Rescorla
- Author: Lt. Gen. Harold G. Moore (Ret.) and Joseph L. Galloway
- Language: English
- Subject: Vietnam, War
- Genre: Historical Non-fiction
- Publisher: Random House
- Publication date: October 20, 1992
- Publication place: United States
- Media type: Hardcover and Trade Paperback
- Pages: 432
- ISBN: 0-679-41158-5
- OCLC: 25832046
- Dewey Decimal: 959.704/342 20
- LC Class: DS557.8.I18 M66 1992

We Were Soldiers Once...and Young: la Drang - The Battle That Changed the War in Vietnam is a 1992 book by Lt. Gen. Harold G. Moore (Ret.) and war journalist Joseph L. Galloway about the Vietnam War. It focuses on the role of the First and Second Battalions of the 7th Cavalry Regiment in the Battle of the Ia Drang Valley, the United States's first large-unit battle of the Vietnam War; previous engagements involved small units and patrols (squad, platoon, and company sized units). It was adapted into the 2002 film We Were Soldiers.

The cover features Lt. Rick Rescorla, a British-American Vietnam War veteran who served for both countries during the war. Rescorla was uncomfortable about being portrayed as a war hero and chose not to read it when he saw that its cover featured a combat photograph of him. When he learned that the book was being made into a film starring Mel Gibson, he told his wife Susan that he had no intention of seeing it, as he felt uncomfortable with anything that portrayed him or other survivors as war heroes, commenting, "The real heroes are dead." Rescorla later served as the director of security for Morgan Stanley and is credited with saving nearly 2,700 lives during the September 11 attacks, dying in the process.

== Reception ==
The book was a New York Times best-seller. David Halberstam called it, "A stunning achievement—paper and words with the permanence of marble. I read it and thought of The Red Badge of Courage, the highest compliment I can think of."

General H. Norman Schwarzkopf said, "We Were Soldiers Once...and Young is a great book of military history, written the way military history should be written."

Since at least 1993, the book has been on the Marine Corps Commandant's Reading List for Career Level Enlisted.

== Editions ==
- Moore, Harold G.; Galloway, Joseph L. (October 20, 1992). We Were Soldiers Once… And Young (Hardcover ed.). Random House Publishing Group. pp. 432. ISBN 0679411585.
- Moore, Harold G.; Galloway, Joseph L. (April 15, 2002). We Were Soldiers Once… And Young (Trade Paperback ed.). Harper Perennial. pp. 528. ISBN 0060013257.
- Moore, Harold G.; Galloway, Joseph L. (August 1, 2002). We Were Soldiers Once… And Young (Hardcover ed.). Thorndike Press. p. 688. ISBN 078624495X.
- Moore, Harold G.; Galloway, Joseph L. (June 29, 2004). We Were Soldiers Once… And Young (Mass Market Paperback ed.). Random House. p. 535. ISBN 0345472640.
- Moore, Harold G.; Galloway, Joseph L. (November 23, 2004). We Were Soldiers Once… And Young (Trade Paperback ed.). Presidio Press. pp. 432. ISBN 034547581X.
