= National Infantry Association =

- Established: April 1982 (44 years ago)
- Headquarters: 3800 S Lumpkin Road, Columbus, Georgia
- Coordinates: 32.389176°N 84.955989°W
- Website: infantryassn.org

The National Infantry Association (NIA) was established in April 1982 at Fort Benning, Georgia as the Infantry Association, operating as a titular organization for the subscribers of “Infantry” magazine. In 1994, it was incorporated as the National Infantryman’s Association, a 501(c)(19) nonprofit organization. In 1998, the organization began doing business as the National Infantry Association.

== See also ==
- Order of Saint Maurice (United States)
