= Joseph L. Galloway =

American journalist (1941–2021)

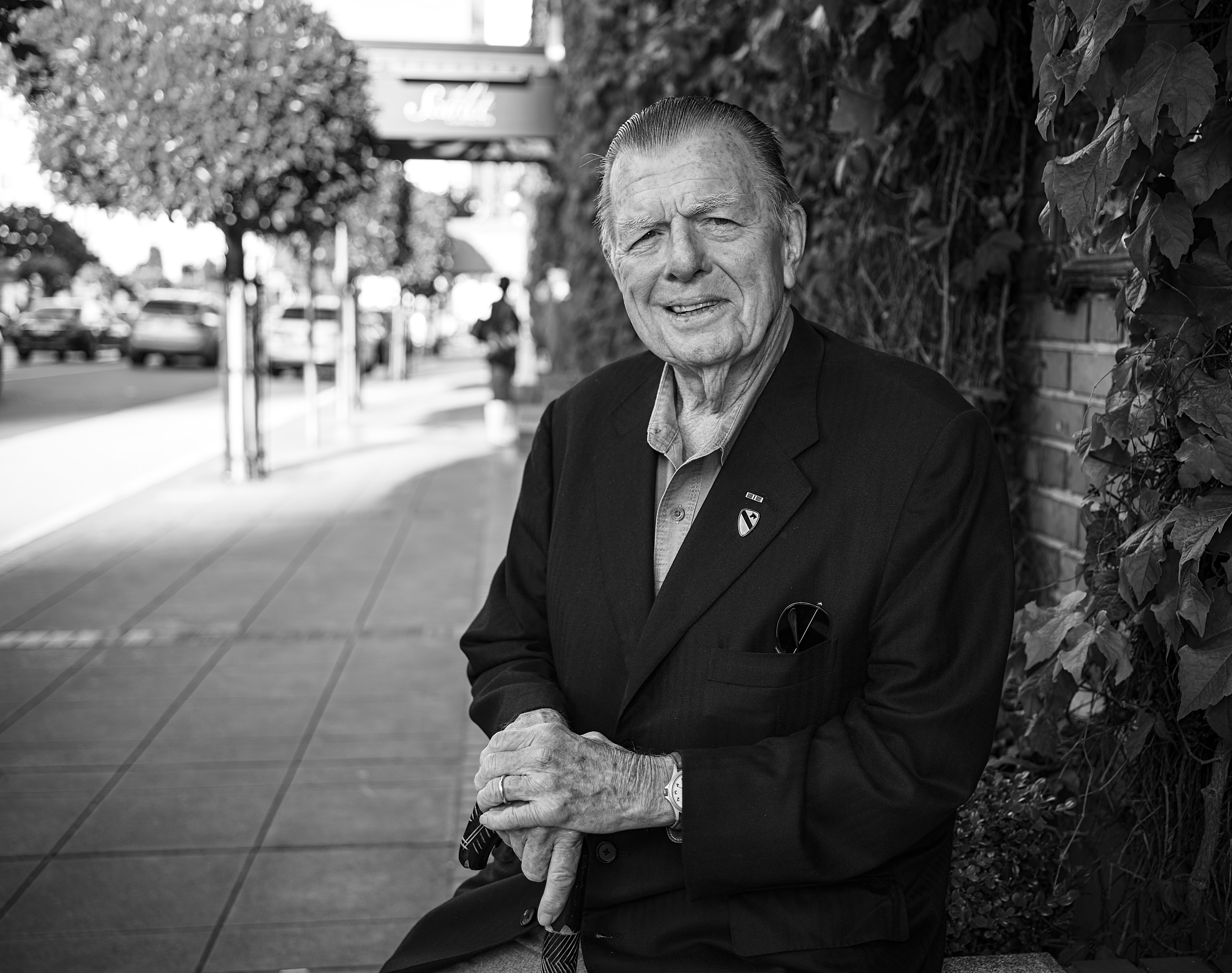
- Galloway in 2017
- Born: Joseph Lee Galloway; November 13, 1941; Bryan, Texas, U.S.
- Died: August 18, 2021 (aged 79); Concord, North Carolina, U.S.
- Occupations: Journalist, Author, Social Speaker
- Awards: National Magazine Award (1991), New Media Award of the National VFW for coverage of the Persian Gulf War (1992), Order of Saint Maurice (2000), Bronze Star Medal (1998) for his actions during the Battle of Ia Drang in 1965

Joseph Lee Galloway (November 13, 1941 – August 18, 2021) was an American newspaper correspondent and columnist. During the Vietnam War, he often worked alongside the American troops he covered and was awarded a Bronze Star Medal in 1998 for having carried a badly wounded man to safety while he was under very heavy enemy fire in 1965. From 2013 until his death, he worked as a special consultant for the Vietnam War 50th anniversary Commemoration project run out of the Office of the Secretary of Defense and has also served as consultant to Ken Burns' production of a documentary history of the Vietnam War broadcast in the fall of 2017 by PBS. He was also the former Military Affairs consultant for the Knight-Ridder chain of newspapers and was a columnist with McClatchy Newspapers.

== Early life ==
Galloway was born in Bryan, Texas, on November 13, 1941. His father, Joseph, fought in the U.S. Army during World War II; his mother was Marian Dewvall. His family relocated to Refugio, Texas, after his father was employed by Humble Oil upon his return from military service. Galloway initially enrolled in community college in 1959, but dropped out after six weeks to join the Army. His mother convinced him to go into journalism, and he subsequently majored in the subject at Victoria College.

== Career ==
=== Newspapers ===
Galloway started his career at The Victoria Advocate in Victoria, Texas, afterwards working for United Press International (UPI) in the Kansas City and Topeka bureaus. Later, he served overseas as bureau chief or regional manager in Tokyo, Vietnam, Jakarta, New Delhi, Singapore, Moscow, and Los Angeles. He worked as a reporter for UPI during the early part of Vietnam War in 1965. Thirty-three years later, he was decorated with the Bronze Star for helping to rescue a badly wounded soldier while under enemy fire on November 15, 1965, during the Battle of Ia Drang at Landing Zone X-Ray in Vietnam.

Galloway retired as a weekly columnist for McClatchy Newspapers in January 2010, writing, "I have loved being a reporter; loved it when we got it right; understood it when we got it wrong...In the end, it all comes down to the people, both those you cover and those you work for, with or alongside during 50 years."

=== Literature ===
Along with Lt. Gen. Harold G. Moore, Galloway co-wrote a detailed account of those experiences in the best-selling 1992 book, We Were Soldiers Once… and Young. A sequel was released in 2008: We Were Soldiers Still: A Journey Back to the Battlefields of Vietnam and Moore and Galloway gave an interview on the book at the Pritzker Military Library on September 17, 2008.

== In popular culture ==
In We Were Soldiers, a 2002 film based on his 1992 book, Galloway is portrayed by actor Barry Pepper.

Actor Edward Burns portrayed him in the miniseries Vietnam in HD, and Tommy Lee Jones played him in the 2017 film Shock and Awe.

=== Narration ===
Galloway narrated A Flag Between Two Families, a documentary film, based on the events of May 9, 1968, in Vietnam by the members of Charlie Company, 1st Battalion, 5th Cavalry.

== Awards ==
In 1991, Galloway received a National Magazine Award for a U.S. News cover article on the Ia Drang battles in Vietnam. In 1992, he received the New Media Award of the National VFW for his coverage of the Persian Gulf War for U.S. News. In 1999, Galloway received the Vietnam Veterans of America Excellence in the Arts Award, along with Gen. Hal Moore, for his journalism and for We Were Soldiers Once and Young at the VVA National Convention in Anaheim, California. In 2002, Galloway received the Robert Denig Award for Exceptional Service of the U.S. Marine Corps Combat Correspondents Assn. In 2005, he received the Tex McCrary Award of the Congressional Medal of Honor Society.

On May 1, 1998, Galloway was decorated with the Bronze Star with "V" device. The medal was in recognition of his heroism on November 15, 1965, during the Battle of Ia Drang, the first major battle by U.S. and North Vietnamese troops in the Vietnam War. Galloway was present as a journalist. During the fighting, he risked his own safety to assist wounded soldiers. His actions are depicted in the film We Were Soldiers in which he is portrayed by actor Barry Pepper. He is the only civilian to be awarded the Bronze Star for combat valor for heroism in the Vietnam War from the U.S. Army.

On May 16, 2000, Galloway was awarded the Order of Saint Maurice Civis level (award #S00042), for significant contribution in support of the Infantry.

== Personal life ==
Galloway married his first wife, Theresa Magdalene Null, in September 1966 and they remained married until her death on January 26, 1996, from cancer. Together they had two sons, Joshua and Lee. In 1998, Galloway married Karen Metsker, daughter of Captain Thomas Metsker who was Hal Moore's Intelligence Officer and was killed in action in 1965 at the Battle of Ia Drang in the Vietnam War. After they divorced in 2003, he married Gracie Liem Lim Suan Tzu, a friend for more than 45 years, on May 13, 2012, in Las Vegas. In attendance at the ceremony was former U.S. Senator Max Cleland and 7th Cavalry veterans John Henry Irsfeld and Dennis Deal. The Galloways resided in Concord, North Carolina.

Galloway died on the morning of August 18, 2021, at a hospital in Concord, North Carolina. He was 79, and suffered from a heart attack prior to his death.

== Recognition ==
In January 2025, President Joe Biden named Galloway as a recipient of the Presidential Citizens Medal.
