= 69th Armor Regiment =

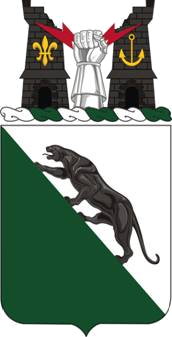
- Coat of arms
- Active: 1940 – present
- Country: USA
- Branch: Regular Army
- Type: Armor
- Size: 2 combined arms battalions
- Part of: 3rd Infantry Division
- Garrison/HQ: 2–69 AR: Ft. Stewart, GA 3–69 AR: Ft. Stewart, GA
- Nickname: "Panthers"
- Mottos: Vitesse et Puissance (Speed & Power)
- Mascot: Black panther
- Engagements: World War II; Korean War; Vietnam War; Persian Gulf War; Iraq War
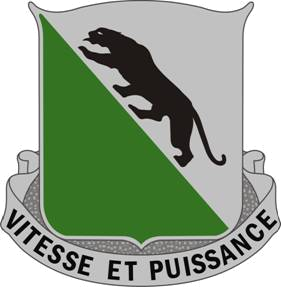
- Distinctive Unit Insignia

The 69th Armor is an armored (tank) regiment of the United States Army. The 69th Armor Regiment is part of the U.S. Army Regimental System with only two battalions, the 2nd and 3rd Battalion, 69th Armor Regiment, existing in separate brigades and representing the regiment as a whole. 2–69 AR is currently stationed at Fort Stewart, Georgia as part of the 2nd Armor Brigade Combat Team ("Spartans"), 3rd Infantry Division and 3–69 AR is stationed at Fort Stewart, Georgia as part of the 1st Armor Brigade Combat Team ("Raider"), 3rd Infantry Division. Both battalions have transformed from tank pure battalions into combined arms battalions (CAB). Each comprising two tank companies and one mechanized infantry company as of August 2019.

== Heraldry ==
=== Distinctive unit insignia ===
- Description: A Silver color metal and enamel device 1 1/8 inches (2.9 cm) in height overall consisting of a shield blazoned: Per bend Argent and Vert on the first a panther passant on division line, head to chief Sable. Attached below and to the sides of the shield a Silver scroll inscribed “VITESSE ET PUISSANCE” in Black letters.
- Symbolism: The shield is in the green and white (silver) of the Armored Force. The panther is symbolic of the tremendous power and striking ability of the regiment. Being always alert, the black variety of panther is considered the most dangerous of all the feline family. The motto translates to “Speed and Power.”
- Background: The distinctive unit insignia was originally approved for the 69th Armored Regiment on 7 September 1942. It was redesignated for the 69th Tank Battalion on 4 November 1943. It was redesignated for the 69th Amphibian Tractor Battalion on 8 January 1946. The insignia was redesignated for the 69th Medium Tank Battalion on 25 February 1954. It was redesignated for the 69th Armor Regiment on 25 July 1958.

=== Coat of arms ===
- Blazon:
  - Shield: Per bend Argent and Vert on the first a panther passant on division line, head to chief sable.
  - Crest: On a wreath of the colors Argent and Vert between two ruined towers Sable, the dexter charged with a fleur-de-lis Or and the sinister with an anchor of the like, a cubit arm in armor, the hand in a gauntlet Proper grasping two lightning flashes fesswise Gules.
  - Motto: VITESSE ET PUISSANCE (Speed and Power).
- Symbolism:
  - Shield: The shield is in the green and white of the Armored Force. The panther is symbolic of the tremendous power and striking ability of the regiment. Being always alert, the black variety of panther is considered the most dangerous of all the feline family.
  - Crest: The two ruined towers bearing a fleur-de-lis and an anchor allude to the two areas, Europe and the Pacific. An element of the former organization was awarded a Distinguished Unit Citation for service in Europe. The Presidential Unit Citations (Navy) were awarded for service in the Pacific during World War II and the Korean War. The gauntlet and lightning flashes symbolize armor and striking power.
- Background: The coat of arms was originally approved for the 69th Armored Regiment on 7 September 1942. It was redesignated for the 69th Tank Battalion on 4 November 1943. It was redesignated for the 69th Amphibian Tractor Battalion on 8 January 1946. The insignia was redesignated for the 69th Medium Tank Battalion on 25 February 1954. It was redesignated for the 69th Armor Regiment on 25 July 1958. It was amended to add a crest on 18 May 1965. The insignia was amended to revise the symbolism of the crest on 29 October 1965.

== World War II ==
The 69th Armored Regiment's history began on 15 July 1940 when it was constituted in the Regular Army. On 31 July, it was activated and assigned to the 1st Armored Division. This original assignment did not last for long. In February 1942 it was reassigned to the 6th Armored Division where it continued to serve until September 1943 when elements of the regiment were divided and reassigned. The Regimental HQ and 1st Battalion remained with the 6th Armored Division as the 69th Tank Battalion, while the 3rd Battalion was re-designated as 708th Amphibian Tank Battalion and was a participant in several critical amphibious campaigns and distinguished itself during the bloody fighting on Okinawa earning the battalion the Navy Presidential Unit Citation.

The 69th Tank Battalion, as part of the 6th Armored Division, was included in various European campaigns including Normandy, the Rhineland, Ardennes-Alsace and Central Europe. The unit, along with many others, was deactivated in 1946 following the end of the Second World War. This deactivation came to an end when the unit was re-designated as the 69th Medium Tank Battalion in August 1950. Once again it assigned to the 6th Armored Division, where it served until it was stood down in 1956, ending its assignment to the 6th Armored Division.

== Korean War ==
Following the outbreak of hostilities on the Korean Peninsula, the 708th Amphibian Tank Battalion was subsequently restructured and re-designated the 89th Medium Tank Battalion. In November 1951, it was again reflagged the 89th Tank Battalion and assigned to the 25th Infantry Division. The unit's combat actions earned the Presidential Unit Citation and the Navy Unit Commendation.

The 89th Tank Battalion returned to Hawaii with the 25th Infantry Division where it remained until deactivation in 1957.

With the establishment of the regimental combat arms system, the formerly fragmented elements of the 2nd Battalion were remade into the 69th Armored Regiment. With the left over elements of the 69th and the 89th Tank Battalions, the 69th Armored Regiment was re-designated the 69th Armor, a parent regiment under the Regimental Combat Arms system.

== Vietnam War ==
The 1st Battalion was alerted to begin preparations for deployment to South Vietnam in December 1965. Deployment commenced on 25 January 1966 with the battalion laying over in Okinawa to take over 52 new M48A3 tanks and familiarize crews with the new series, AN-GRC 12 radios. Contrasting with the old battalion M48A2 vehicles, the new A3 models still featured the 90 mm cannon, a M2HB cupola mounted .50 caliber machinegun and a 7.62mm, M72 coaxial machinegun. Moreover, it now boasted a V12 Continental Diesel engine which more than doubled the tank's combat range and significantly reduced the hazard of fire.

The battalion shipped from Okinawa to Vietnam, and true to the policy at the time, was fragmented, with the battalion HQ, trains, A and C companies going to Củ Chi supporting the main elements of the 25th Infantry Division, while B Company joined the 3rd Brigade of the 25th Division in Pleiku.

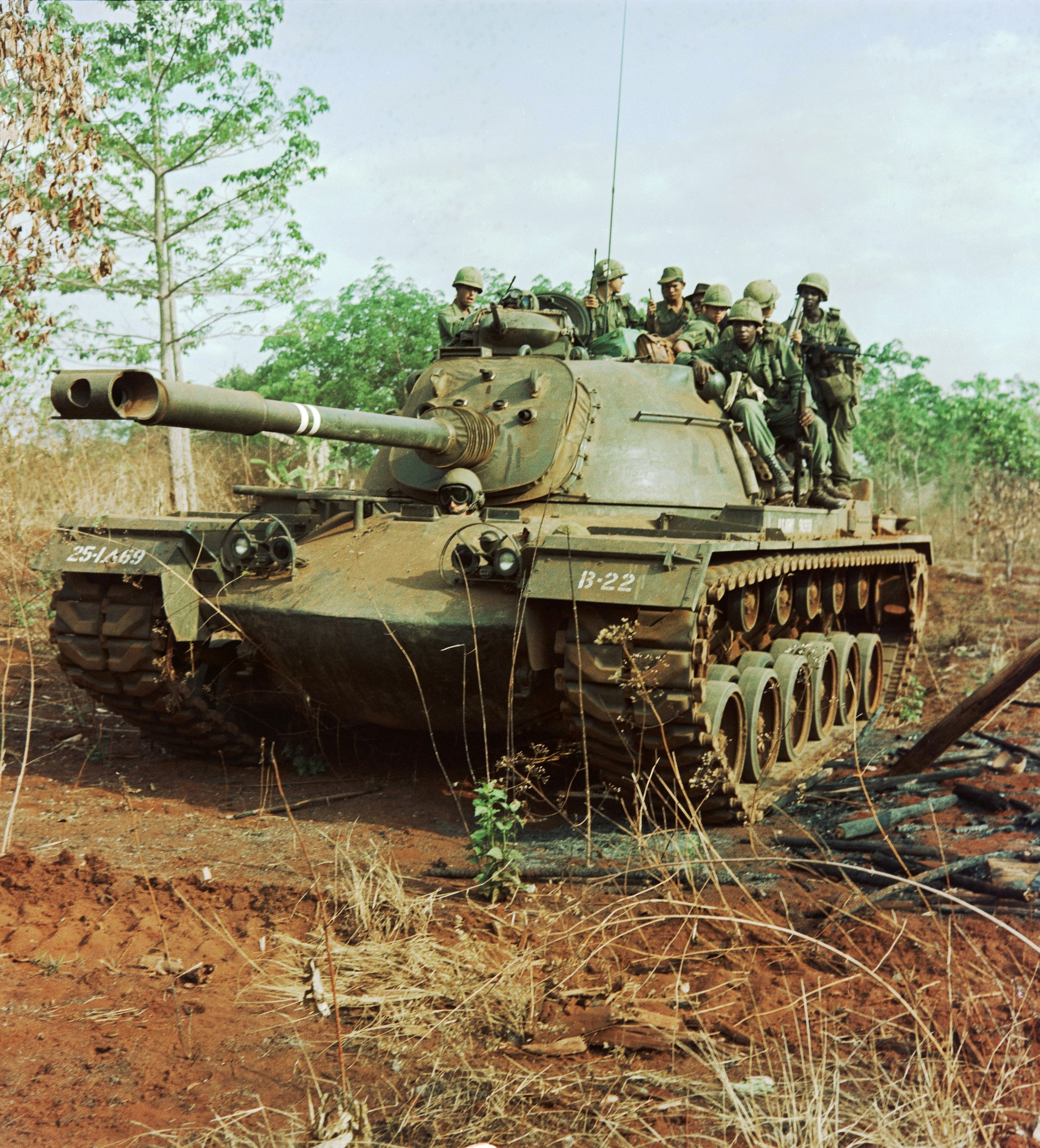
An M48A3 Patton of 1st Battalion, 69th Armor moving through a destroyed Vietcong camp south of Pleiku during Operation Lincoln, March 1966

A Company was committed within two hours of its disembarking from LSTs in Saigon as a reaction force to combat in the Filhol Rubber Plantation west of Saigon.

The battalion's first major combat operation took place in April 1966 in the tangled jungle growth of the Ho Bo Woods (Operation Circle Pines) and along the trails of the Filhol Rubber plantation (Operation Kalamazoo) again, northwest of Saigon. This operation proved the value of armor in reducing friendly casualties while significantly increasing losses to the enemy. 69th Armor tankers learned on-the-job the importance of rear and flank security, the effect of canister in dense jungle, the exaggerated needs for constant maintenance halts and the value and down-sides of assorted OVM and equipment. The 52 ton M48A3 performed well during this initial two-week fight and the unit set an example for future tactical employment of armor in Vietnam.

Similarly, B Company's actions along the Plei Me/Duc Co corridor, paralleling the Cambodian border set the tone for future savage fighting Battalion elements would encounter in this critical Central Highlands area of enemy infiltration.

1st Platoon, B Company earned a special Presidential Unit Citation in August 1966 for their actions at LZ 27 Victor, a small Korean enclave in the triple canopy jungles of the Ia Drang-Chu Pong mountain area, where nine months earlier, the 1st Cavalry Division (Airmobile) fought savage battles with infiltrating North Vietnamese units.

LTC Fairfield was promoted and subsequently reassigned as command of 1/69 Armor passed to LTC Clyde O. Clark. The bulk of the battalion was moved in May 1966 to Qui Nhon via LST, then overland along the infamous QL (Highway) 19 to join B Company at Camp Enari near Pleiku, the home of the 4th Infantry Division.

LTC Paul S. Williams Jr. took command of 1/69 Armor in March 1967 and continued operations in support of the 3rd Brigade, 25th Infantry Division. Company A was attached to the 1st Cavalry Division until October 1967. During this period Alpha Company supported the three Sky Trooper brigades in heavy combat operations along the South China Sea coast, distinguishing itself in savage fighting against Main Force Viet Cong, for countless fortified village complexes in Binh Dinh province and the Bong Son plain area. For its actions A Company was awarded the Valorous Unit Citation.

A Company completed its mission with the 1st Cavalry in October 1967 and returned to Camp Enari with Battalion HQ. Earlier, in September, the battalion, along with the other elements of the 3rd Brigade, 25th Infantry Division became part of the 3rd Brigade, 4th Infantry Division in a swap of brigades in place. LTC William Grant assumed command of 1/69 Armor as the battalion was given the mission of securing the primary routes of communication on QL 19, between Qui Nhon on the coast and Duc Co on the Cambodian border; and on QL 14 between Đắk Tô in the north to Ban Me Thuot in the south. These routes were notorious for ambush actions dating back to the First Indochina War of the 1950s. The battalion was instrumental in keeping these vital roads open for re-supply of units heavily engaged with the North Vietnamese during the heavy battles around Đắk Tô and Kontum in November 1967.

For actions during a reaction force operation just prior to Tet in January 1968, Sp5 Dwight Hal Johnson, gunner on B11, was awarded the Medal of Honor.

1/69 Armor played a critical role in the defense of Pleiku, Kontum, Dak To and Highway 19 during the Jan/Feb. 1968 Tet Offensive. The battalion displaced its forward headquarters in March, from Hwy 14S to Camp Radcliff in An Khê, under the operational control of the 173rd Airborne Brigade to join Operation Walker and was again involved in fighting along the coastal plain near Bong Son.

A Company was charged with the security of Highway 19 between An Khe and Mang Yang Pass, and on 10 April, routed a regimental size ambush attempt on a convoy by the 95B Regiment killing 45 VC and capturing seven crew-served weapons; U.S. losses were one killed.

LTC Theodore S. Riggs took command of the battalion in March 1968, prior to its displacement to An Khe. Meanwhile, B and C Companies were placed OPCON to the Republic of Korea's 'Tiger' Division, headquartered at Camp Thunderbolt near Qui Nhon to support Operation Maeng Ho 11. B Company elements engaged units of the 18th and 22nd NVA Regiments, as well as the 2nd VC Main Force Regiment in heavy combat between 10 and 25 April in the area of Ky Son, killing over 100 enemy.

LTC (MG Retired) Stan R. Sheridan assumed command of 1/69 Armor in September 1968 as the battalion forward HQ again moved, this time west to the area of Landing Zone Oasis, HQ of the 3rd Brigade, 4th Infantry Division along QL 19W, conducting numerous reconnaissance-in-force operations north and east of Đức Cơ and along the Cambodian border. Also during this period, a provisional detachment of tanks taken from each line company, was detailed to support elements of the 101st Airborne Division and the 44th ARVN Regiment in the Phan Thiet-Song Mao area.

The battalion continued operations west of Pleiku and along the coastal plain during 1969 with both the 4th Division and the 173rd Airborne Brigade. B Company was given the mission of reaction force and route security between Đắk Tô and the besieged Special Forces border camp of Ben Het. Bravo Company's 1st Platoon, detailed to provide additional firepower to the SF camp, fought what was to be the only engagement between U.S. and NVA armor on the night of 3 March. Obviously surprised by the presence of the U.S. tanks, the enemy fled the field after the B Company M48s destroyed 2 of the assaulting PT 76 tanks and a BTR50 fighting vehicle.

LTCs Leo M. Brandt, Donald J. Pagel and MAJ George Latturner each commanded the battalion for short periods from April to December 1969. The battalion continued to support the 4th Infantry Division along the Highway 19 corridor, from Qui Nhon to Đức Cơ during the period, where it fought hot actions in and around LZ Schueller, An Khe, Plei Djereng and Plei Me.

LTC James L. Marini took command in December 1969 and continued operations until the battalion stood down with the 3rd Brigade, 4th Infantry Division and returned to the U.S. in mid-1970. The unit and its component line companies were awarded the Presidential Unit Citation, the Valorous Unit Award, the Meritorious Award, the Vietnam Cross of Gallantry with Palm and the Vietnam Civic Action Award First Class.

== Cold War ==
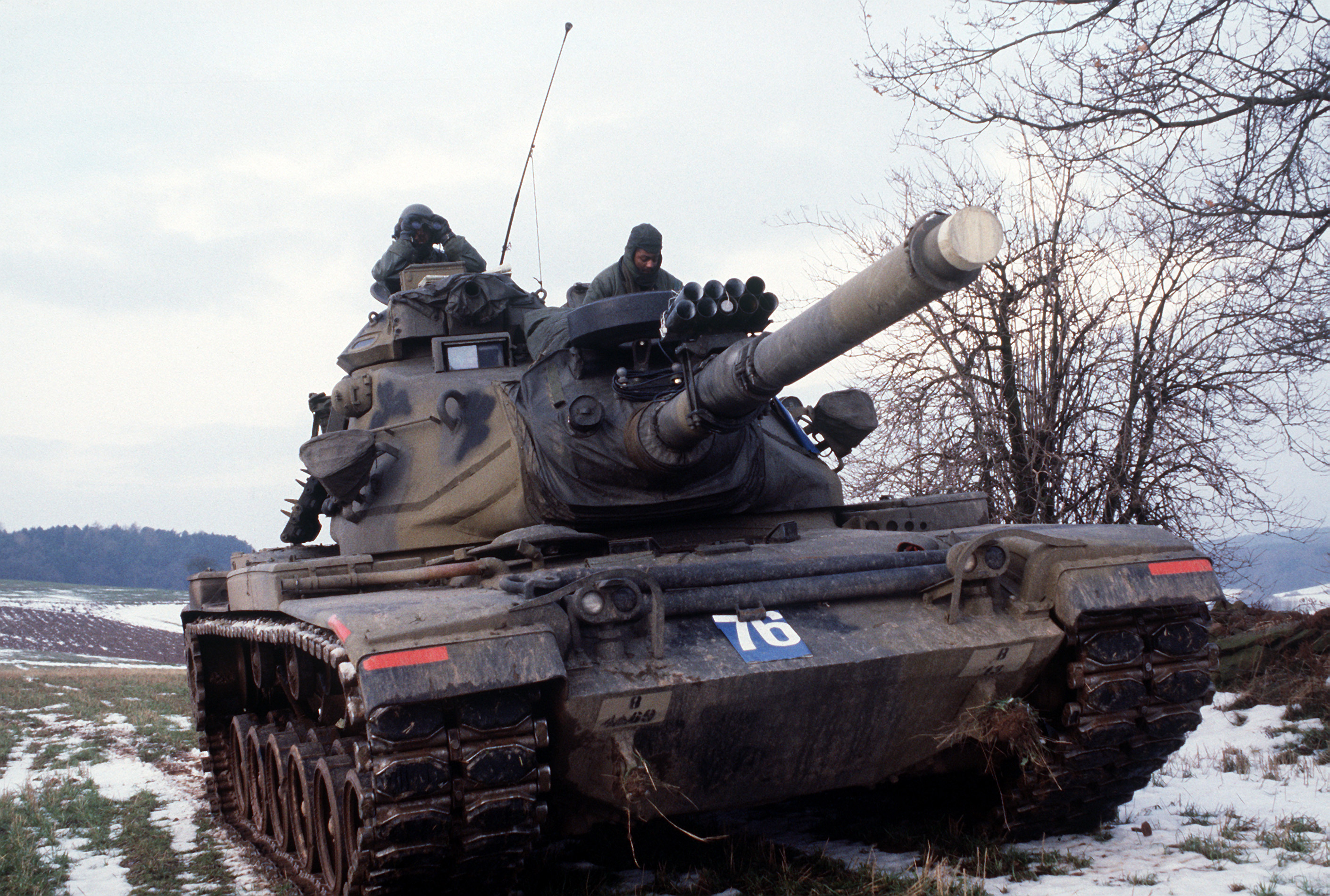
M60A3 of 4-69 Armor with commander using binoculars during the Exercise Reforger 1985.

The 1st Battalion was again reactivated and assigned to the 3rd Infantry Division in Germany in 1975. It was subsequently deactivated in late 1991 with the regimental colors returning to the 2nd Battalion at Fort Benning, Georgia. The 2nd Battalion at Fort Benning, and the 3rd Battalion assigned to Fort Stewart, Georgia, were organic to the 24th Infantry Division (Mechanized). The 4th Battalion was reactivated in 1972 at 1st Brigade HHC 8th Infantry Division at Robert E. Lee Barracks in Mainz Gonsenheim Germany.

== Operation Desert Storm ==
As part of the 197th Infantry Brigade (Separate), 2d Battalion, 69th Armor led the assault of the 24th Infantry Division into Iraq during Operation Desert Storm in February 1991. 3d Battalion, 69th Armor similarly operated with the 24th Division during war. Both received the Superior Unit Award.

== Global War on Terrorism ==
=== Operation Iraqi Freedom I ===
In 2002 the 2nd Battalion, 69th Armor deployed with 3rd Brigade Combat Team, 3rd Infantry Division to Operation Desert Spring in preparation for future combat operations in a six-month training mission. In January 2003, 2nd Battalion, 69th Armor deployed to Kuwait awaiting orders to begin combat operations. On 19 March 2003, 2nd Battalion, 69th Armor was the tip of the spear, leading the famous "March to Baghdad." In July 2003, following the downfall of the regime under Saddam Hussein. Both Battalions were redeployed to Georgia and awarded the Presidential Unit Award.

=== Operation Iraqi Freedom III ===
In January 2005, Deploying to FOB Scunion (adjacent to FOB Warhorse) the partial Battalion again deployed in support of Operation Iraqi Freedom. 2nd Battalion, 69th Armor served with the 42nd ID, a National Guard Division based in NY. Operations were based in the Al Khalis District. In June 2005, 2nd Battalion, 69th Armor was called to be the tip of the spear again against the insurgent influence in the city of Ramadi in the Al Anbar province. Able-co/2-69 AR, Delta/2-69 AR, HHC/2-69 AR, and E/203 SB (FSC/2-69 AR) along with B/1-30 IN operated out of CAMP CORREGIDOR and COMBAT OUTPOST on the eastern side of Ar Ramadi. C/2-69 AR, along with additional attachments, remained in Al Khalis to serve with the Iraqi Army in that area. Throughout the deployment, B/2-69 AR and E/2-69 AR were attached to 1-10 FA and served in the Baqubah area. Following great successes in Chalis Qada and Ar Ramadi, the battalion redeployed to Fort Benning, Georgia in January 2006. E/203 SB was awarded the Navy Unit Commendation. B/2-69 AR and E/2-69 AR were awarded the Meritorious Unit Citation.

=== Operation Iraqi Freedom V ===
In March 2007, 2nd Battalion, 69th Armor was deployed as part of the Baghdad "surge." The battalion served under Multi-National Division – Baghdad on the Karada Peninsula as well as the Al Muthana and Al Jedidah regions of Eastern Baghdad. The battalion served first under 2nd BCT, 2ID and later under 4th BCT, 10th MTN DIV while detached from the rest of the 3rd HBCT. The battalion redeployed in May 2008 to Fort Benning, Georgia and awarded the Valorous Unit Award.

=== Operation Iraqi Freedom VII ===
In October 2009, the battalion deployed to Iraq in support of Operation Iraqi Freedom for a fourth time, operating as an Advise and Assist Battalion in Babil and Karbala Provinces building the economic capacity and governance capabilities of local Iraqi government. This deployment was part of the transition from Operation Iraqi Freedom to Operation New Dawn. The battalion played an important role by providing security assistance during the crucial Iraqi national elections in March 2010. The battalion then redeployed to Fort Benning, Georgia in October 2010 and was awarded the Meritorious Unit Award.

=== Operation Enduring Freedom ===
In 2013, 3rd Battalion was deployed to eastern Afghanistan in Wardak, Nangarhar, & Ghazni Provinces. They suffered three casualties that year.

== Commanders ==
- 1st Battalion
  - LTC R.J. Fairfield Jr., 31 July 1965 – ?
  - LTC Clyde O. Clark,
  - LTC Paul S. Williams Jr., March 1967
  - LTC Theodore S. Riggs, March 1968
  - LTC Stan R. Sheridan, September 1968
  - LTC Leo M. Brandt, April 1969
  - LTC Donald J. Pagel
  - MAJ George Latturner
  - LTC James L. Marini, December 1969
  - LTC Robert Coon, - March 1990
  - LTC Robert J. Graebener, March 1990 - October 1991 (Colors Cased)
- 2nd Battalion
  - LTC Lon E. Maggart, April 1984 – April 1986
  - LTC David Merriam, April 1986 - 1988
  - LTC Walter Bunyea, 1988-1990
  - LTC Ricardo Sanchez, during Operation Desert Storm 90–91
  - LTC Jeffery R. Sanderson, May 2002 – June 2004
  - LTC Robert R. Roggeman, June 2004 – June 2006
  - LTC Troy Perry, June 2006 – July 2008
  - LTC Robert Ashe, July 2008 – January 2011
  - LTC John E. Pirog, January 2011 – May 2013
  - LTC Dominick Edwards, May 2013 – December 2015
  - LTC Marc Austin, 2017 – December 2020
  - LTC George E Bolton Jr., December 2020 – July 2022
  - LTC Timothy W. Decker, July 2022 – June 2024
  - LTC Chase S. Baker, June 2024 - July 2026
  - LTC Jonathan M. Byrd, July 2026 - Present
- 3rd Battalion
  - LTC Kennedy, 1988 - 1990
  - LTC Terry Stanger, 1990 - 1992
  - LTC Keith C. Walker, 1992 - 1994
  - LTC Michael E. Silverman,
  - LTC Jessie L. Robinson, 27 July 2008 – October 2009
  - LTC Jeff Denius, October 2009 – October 2011
  - LTC Orestees "Bo" T. Davenport, October 2011 – October 2013
  - LTC Harry "Zan" Hornbuckle, October 2013 – July 2015
  - LTC Johnny A. Evans Jr., July 2015 – May 2017
  - LTC William F. Coryell, May 2017 - 2019
  - LTC Andrew E. Lembke, 2019 – 2021
  - LTC Stoney Portis, 2021 – 2023
  - LTC James Braudis, 2023–present
- 4th Battalion
  - LTC Dale Brudvig, 1972–??
  - LTC Stewart W. Wallace June 1985 - June 1987
  - LTC J. Steven Hunter June 1987 - October 1987

== Medal of Honor recipients ==
- Specialist 5 Dwight H. Johnson. Vietnam War. Rank and organization: Specialist Fifth Class, U.S. Army, Company B, 1st Battalion, 69th Armor, 4th Infantry Division. Place and date: Near Dak To, Kontum Province, Republic of Vietnam, 15 January 1968. Entered service at: Detroit, Mich. Born: 7 May 1947, Detroit, Mich. Citation: For conspicuous gallantry and intrepidity at the risk of his life above and beyond the call of duty. Sp5c. Johnson, a tank driver with Company B, was a member of a reaction force moving to aid other elements of his platoon, which was in heavy contact with a battalion size North Vietnamese force. Sp5c. Johnson's tank, upon reaching the point of contact, threw a track and became immobilized. Realizing that he could do no more as a driver, he climbed out of the vehicle, armed only with a .45 caliber pistol. Despite intense hostile fire, Sp5c. Johnson killed several enemy soldiers before he had expended his ammunition. Returning to his tank through a heavy volume of antitank rocket, small arms and automatic weapons fire, he obtained a sub-machine gun to continue his fight against the advancing enemy. Armed with this weapon, Sp5c. Johnson again braved deadly enemy fire to return to the center of the ambush site where he courageously eliminated more of the determined foe. Engaged in extremely close combat when the last of his ammunition was expended, he killed an enemy soldier with the stock end of his submachine gun. Now weaponless, Sp5c. Johnson ignored the enemy fire around him, climbed into his platoon sergeant's tank, extricated a wounded crewmember and carried him to an armored personnel carrier. He then returned to the same tank and assisted in firing the main gun until it jammed. In a magnificent display of courage, Sp5c. Johnson exited the tank and again armed only with a .45 caliber pistol, engaged several North Vietnamese troops in close proximity to the vehicle. Fighting his way through devastating fire and remounting his own immobilized tank, he remained fully exposed to the enemy as he bravely and skillfully engaged them with the tank's externally mounted .50 caliber machine gun; where he remained until the situation was brought under control. Sp5c. Johnson's profound concern for his fellow soldiers, at the risk of his life above and beyond the call of duty are in keeping with the highest traditions of the military service and reflect great credit upon himself and the U.S. Army.

== See also ==
- 3rd Battalion, 69th Armor Regiment
- Dwight H. Johnson
- M1 Abrams
- Bradley Fighting Vehicle
