= Operation Lincoln (Vietnam War) =

Part of the Vietnam War (1966)

- Part of the Vietnam War
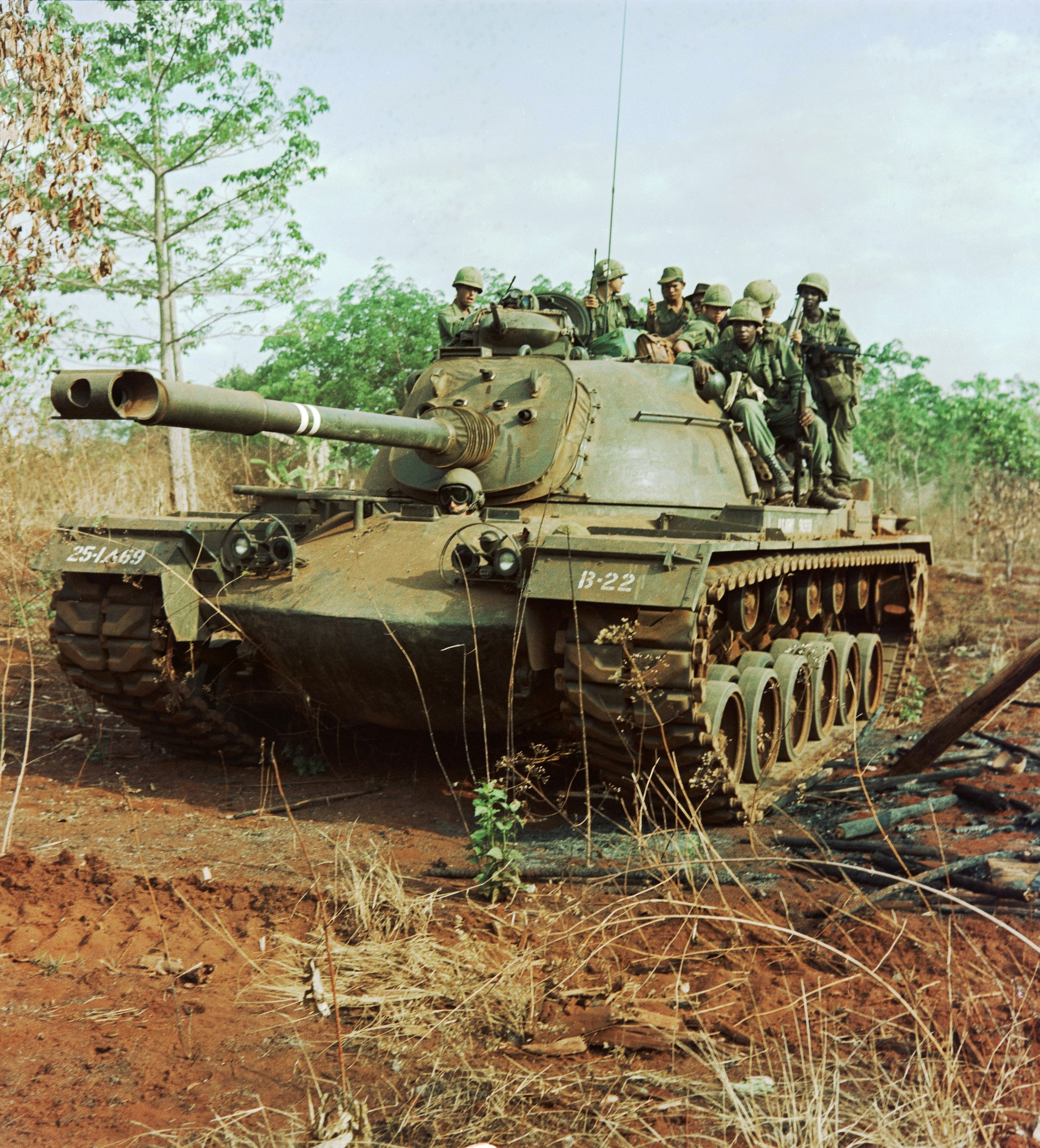
- An M48A3 Patton of 1st Battalion, 69th Armor advancing during the operation
Date	25 March – 8 April 1966
Location	Pleiku, Gia Lai Province, South Vietnam 13.983°N 108°E
Result	U.S. victory

Belligerents
United States	North Vietnam

Commanders and leaders
MGen Harry Kinnard; Col John J. Hennessey	

Units involved
1st Cavalry Division; Company B, 1st Battalion, 69th Armored; Troop C, 3rd Squadron, 4th Cavalry Regiment; 3rd Brigade, 25th Infantry Division	18B Regiment

Strength
	1,000+

Casualties and losses
43 killed	477 killed 232 estimated killed

Operation Lincoln was an operation conducted by the 1st Cavalry Division west of Pleiku, lasting from 25 March to 8 April 1966, with the goal of locating suspected North Vietnamese and Viet Cong bases to disrupt any planned offensives during the monsoon season.

Following multiple inconclusive skirmishes from 25 to 29 March, American scout helicopters landed in the middle of a North Vietnamese way-station in the immediate vicinity of 1000 soldiers. American forces lost two helicopters to North Vietnamese fire, but ultimately secured the area and declared the operation success as North Vietnamese soldiers withdrew toward the Cambodian border.

== Prelude ==
Operation Lincoln was planned as an operation to search out suspected People's Army of Vietnam (PAVN) and Viet Cong base areas around Đức Cơ, Plei Me and Thach An in the Central Highlands to disrupt any planned monsoon season offensive.

== Operation ==
On 25 March Company B, 1st Battalion, 69th Armored Regiment and Troop C, 3rd Squadron, 4th Cavalry Regiment were deployed along Highway 19 to secure the road from the Mang Yang Pass to Landing Zone Oasis, which was to be the forward headquarters for the 1st Brigade, 1st Cavalry Division, commanded by Col. John J. Hennessey. With the road secured, the Brigade headquarters, 2nd Battalion, 8th Cavalry Regiment and 2nd Battalion, 17th Artillery Regiment went by convoy from Camp Radcliff to LZ Oasis. Company C 2/8 Cavalry was deployed north of Pleiku to protect a landing zone called the Turkey Farm which was to be the advanced helicopter base for the operation. 1st Battalion, 12th Cavalry Regiment and 2nd Battalion, 19th Artillery Regiment were landed by C-130 at Đức Cơ Camp and 1st Battalion, 8th Cavalry Regiment was landed by helicopter at Landing Zone Bear 10 km southeast of Đức Cơ.

From 26 to 29 March 1/8 Cavalry and 1/12 Cavalry swept the area west to the Cambodian border and as far south as the northern Ia Drang Valley, triggering several small, inconclusive skirmishes.

On the afternoon of 30 March scout helicopters from Troop B, 1st Battalion, 9th Cavalry Regiment spotted 3 PAVN soldiers 5 km south of the Chu Pong Massif (near the scene of the Battle of Ia Drang the previous November). The scouts fired on the PAVN and this flushed out approximately 30 more PAVN who were hiding in the undergrowth. Troop A, 1/9 Cavalry numbering 28 men was deployed by helicopter to a landing zone just south of the initial sighting and 3 squads moved northeast, while 1 squad secured the landing zone. One of the squads captured a PAVN soldier who revealed that the Cavalry had landed in the middle of a PAVN way-station and that over 1000 soldiers (later identified as the PAVN 18B Regiment which had just come down the Ho Chi Minh Trail) were in the immediate area. The interrogation was cut short by a volley of PAVN fire which mortally wounded the Troop commander Captain John Sabine. The Cavalry Troop retreated toward the landing zone covered by fire from 1/9 Huey gunships. Helicopters were called in to extract the Troop, but the second helicopter with the prisoner aboard was shot down and crashed nearby killing the prisoner, the survivors were rescued by another helicopter. 15 Cavalry soldiers remained on the ground and when another helicopter landed it could not take all on board, leaving 3 men who volunteered to stay behind, the overloaded helicopter took off, was hit by PAVN fire and crashed killing all but 2 on board. Another helicopter was able to extract the last 3 soldiers.

While the Troop was being extracted, Company A 1/12 Cavalry was landed unopposed at Landing Zone Eagle (13.468°N 107.687°E) 500m southwest of the initial sighting and moved northwest until they were engaged by concealed PAVN machine guns wounding the Company commander and killing the executive officer. The Company pulled back to LZ Eagle covered by gunship fire. A CH-47 sent in to extract the Company was hit by PAVN fire and crashed. The Company then formed a defensive perimeter around the crashed CH-47. At 01:30 2 supply drops were made, one of which was recovered by the Cavalrymen. Company A 1/8 Cavalry and Battery A 2/19 Artillery established a firebase 9 km to the east and this artillery fire and air support around the position deterred any PAVN attack overnight. The PAVN slipped away during the night and in the morning the Cavalry found 197 PAVN bodies around the position.

The action at LZ Eagle caused the entire 1st Brigade to move to the south of the Chu Pong Massif on 31 March where they policed the battlefield and pursued PAVN stragglers.

On 31 March General Kinnard added the 3rd Brigade, 1st Cavalry Division, commanded by Col Hal Moore to the operation and the 3rd Brigade, 25th Infantry Division was opconned to the 1st Cavalry Division. The 3 Brigades then began searching the area around the Chu Pong Massif. While there were some small skirmishes and 1/9 Cavalry and 2nd Battalion, 20th Aerial Rocket Artillery Regiment helicopter gunships fired on PAVN retreating towards Cambodia, no large scale engagement took place.

== Aftermath ==
Operation Lincoln officially concluded on 8 April, PAVN losses were 477 killed and a further 232 estimated killed, U.S. losses were 43 killed. The operation was regarded as a success in that it disrupted PAVN plans for a monsoon season offensive.
