= Landing Zone Schueller =

Site information
- Type: Army Base

Location
- Coordinates: 13°58′10″N 108°33′30″E

Site history
- Built: 1965
- In use: 1966-71
- Battles/wars: Vietnam War

Garrison information
- Occupants: 1st Cavalry Division; 4th Infantry Division

Landing Zone Schueller (also known as LZ Road or FSB Schueller) is a former U.S. Army base west of An Khê District in central Vietnam.

== History ==
The base was first established in 1965 by the 1st Cavalry Division, beside QL-19 and approximately 13 km west of An Khê near the Mang Yang Pass. The base was originally named after 1LT James Schueller, from the 2nd Battalion, 17th Artillery who was killed in a Lockheed C-130 Hercules crash at Camp Radcliff on 17 June 1967.

The base was later used by the 3rd Brigade, 4th Infantry Division.

On 10 April 1968 a People's Army of Vietnam (PAVN) force estimated at 250 men attempted to block Route 19 and create an ambush west of Schueller. A booby-trapped artillery round was discovered on the road by MPs and when a bomb-disposal team arrived the ambush was triggered prematurely. A reaction force from the 1st Battalion, 69th Armor Regiment at Schueller was called forward and quickly overwhelmed the PAVN ambushers some of whom retreated to a nearby hill where they were assaulted by the 1st Battalion, 503rd Infantry. The engagement resulted in 1 U.S. and 40 PAVN killed.

On the night of 21 January 1969 the 1st Battalion, 50th Infantry based at Schueller mounted a night ambush along Route 19 4 km west of Schueller killing 6 PAVN sappers who had been sabotaging the fuel pipeline beside Route 19.

Other units stationed at Schueller included:

- 7th Battalion, 15th Artillery (April–October 1971)
- 2nd Battalion, 17th Artillery

== Current use ==
The base is abandoned and largely turned over to housing and farmland.
