= Operation Walker =

Part of the Vietnam War (1968–1969)

- Part of the Vietnam War
Date	17 March 1968 – 31 January 1969
Location	Bình Định Province, South Vietnam
Result	U.S. operational success

Belligerents
United States	North Vietnam; Viet Cong

Commanders and leaders
BG Richard J. Allen	

Units involved
1st Battalion, 503rd Infantry Regiment	(Vietnam) 95B Regiment

Casualties and losses
42 killed	272 killed 72 individual and 13 crew-served weapons recovered

Operation Walker was a security operation conducted during the Vietnam War by the U.S. Army's 1st Battalion, 503rd Infantry Regiment, 173rd Airborne Brigade in Bình Định Province, South Vietnam from 17 March 1968 to 31 January 1969.

== Background ==
Following the 173rd Airborne Brigade's withdrawal from Operation MacArthur, the 1st Battalion, 503rd Infantry Regiment was assigned to defend Camp Radcliff, the Brigade's main base at An Khê in western Bình Định Province and Route 19 that linked Pleiku with the coastal logistics hub at Qui Nhơn. The allied bases in the highlands depended on the large, slow-moving truck convoys that traveled back and forth from Qui Nhơn. Although the allies had used Rome plows and defoliants to strip a wide belt of vegetation from either side of Route 19, there were still numerous places where the People's Army of Vietnam (PAVN)/Vietcong (VC) could lay in wait. The PAVN/VC concentrated their attacks in the Mang Yang Pass, a narrow and twisting section of Route 19 approximately halfway between An Khê and Pleiku where the 2nd Squadron, 1st Cavalry Regiment, 4th Infantry Division, passed off eastbound convoys to the 1/503rd Infantry, or acquired those coming west. The VC 5th Battalion, 95B Regiment and the 124th Mortar Company periodically tried to shut down the strategic pass.

== Operation ==
On 10 April the 95B Regiment ambushed a convoy in the Mang Yang Pass, a unit of the 69th Armor Regiment and infantry repulsed the attack killing 45 PAVN/VC and capturing seven crew-served weapons; U.S. losses were one killed.

On 8 May a unit of the Battalion operating 14 miles (23 km) west-southwest of An Khê was attacked by fire, the unit returned fire supported by artillery and helicopter gunships and the enemy withdrew at 11:30 leaving 16 dead; U.S. losses were two killed.

On 30 October at 02:00 Camp Radcliff was hit by mortar fire followed by a ground probe. Artillery and AC-47 Spooky gunship fire was directed onto the firing positions and the enemy withdrew after 20 minutes leaving one captured.

== Aftermath ==
The operation concluded on 31 January 1969. PAVN/VC losses were 272 killed and 72 individual and 13 crew-served weapons captured. U.S. losses were 42 killed.
