= Battle of Highway 19 (1965) =

1965 battle during the Vietnam War

- Part of the Vietnam War
Date	20-24 February 1965
Location	Highway 19, South Vietnam
Result	PAVN/VC victory

Belligerents
Viet Cong; North Vietnam	South Vietnam; United States

Commanders and leaders
	(South Vietnam) General Nguyễn Hữu Có (United States) General William Westmoreland

Casualties and losses
	(South Vietnam) 43 killed, 58 missing (United States) 1 killed

The Battle of Highway 19 was a major action between the Viet Cong (VC) and Army of the Republic of Vietnam (ARVN) in February 1965. It marked the first use of United States Air Force (USAF) jet aircraft to support ARVN operations and one of the first instances of North Vietnamese People's Army of Vietnam (PAVN) forces in combat in South Vietnam.

== Background ==
Since 30 January 1965, the VC had blocked Highway 19, a vital corridor that linked Qui Nhon on the coast with Pleiku City and the rest of the Central Highlands. On 17 February, a Civilian Irregular Defense Group (CIDG) company from An Khê established two patrol bases overlooking the road as it wound through the Mang Yang Pass. The first, Forward Operating Base (FOB) 1, was 18km west of An Khe, while FOB 2 lay an additional 14km further west. Still, the road remained closed to traffic.

== Battle ==
At 16:00 on 20 February, a VC company attacked FOB 1. The CIDG commander at An Khê sent a company to help. The VC ambushed the unit, but it nevertheless pushed through to FOB 1. The following morning, the VC ambushed the column as it returned to An Khê, destroying all its vehicles. A fresh company rushed from An Khê to help. It ran into a VC roadblock. Under mortar fire and threatened with encirclement, it also withdrew to An Khê.

On the 22nd, II Corps' US Special Forces C Detachment at Pleiku conceived a new operation to reopen Highway 19. That morning, a CIDG company left the Suoi Doi special forces camp, 33km west of An Khê, and marched eastward escorted by a US Army UH-1B gunship. As the CIDG neared the now abandoned FOB 1 at 15:50, the VC unleashed a torrent of RPG-2s that destroyed the column's vehicles. Two VC companies then rushed forward. After radioing the gunship overhead for assistance, the senior American, 2nd Lieutenant Leslie D. Griggs, ignored a wound he had received from a grenade and led a counterattack. The CIDG forces advanced only 20 meters when heavy fire stopped them and wounded Griggs and an American sergeant. Griggs got back on his feet, dragged the sergeant to safety, and then killed four VC before being wounded a third time and falling unconscious. Leaderless and low on ammunition, the CIDG soldiers tried to surrender, but when they saw that the VC was not granting quarter, they used knives and bayonets to fight their way out toward FOB 2. Left behind were some of the casualties, including the unconscious Griggs, the wounded sergeant, and a dead US soldier. When Griggs awoke, he found the battle over and the VC beginning to withdraw. He crawled to the unit’s radio and called in a strike by US helicopter gunships. The VC held fast, driving off the helicopters and wounding a pilot. Once the VC left, US helicopters evacuated the casualties, including Griggs and the two other advisers. The Army awarded Griggs the Distinguished Service Cross.

As events were unfolding at the ambush site, a helicopter-borne quick reaction force comprising a CIDG platoon landed behind the VC at 16:20. Too weak to accomplish anything and mistakenly attacked by Army gunships, the CIDGs hunkered down until US helicopters delivered a company from the 22nd Ranger Battalion to reinforce them. As they advanced, they discovered that a bus had also been caught in the ambush, with several civilians killed or wounded. VC resistance prevented further progress, so the combined force withdrew into a defensive perimeter for the night.

On the morning of 23 February, II Corps' commander Brigadier general Nguyễn Hữu Có sent the rest of the 22nd Ranger Battalion westward from An Khê while ordering the troops from the CIDG platoon and the detached Ranger company to examine the ambush site before marching eastward. The combined CIDG and ranger force reached the ambush site at 07:00, but found the VC too strong to push eastward and withdrew to FOB 2 instead. Meanwhile, the 22nd Rangers advancing from An Khê encountered a VC battalion dug in on high ground on both sides of the highway. The Rangers assaulted the VC who stood their ground. The battalion commander broke contact and requested air support. First US Army helicopter gunships strafed the VC, then four USAF A-1Es bombed them. At 16:00, the battalion renewed the assault. It enveloped VC soldiers north of the road, but they rebuffed the attack in hand-to-hand combat. The Ranger commander then tried the same tactic against the VC south of the road. This time, the Rangers succeeded in capturing the VC position, only to be driven back in a counterattack. Having failed to break the VC, the battalion withdrew to a night perimeter. Clothing and documents found on VC corpses indicated they were actually PAVN regulars.

That night, the allies decided on an airmobile evacuation of the 220 men trapped at FOB 2. In January, the US Joint Chiefs of Staff had given COMUSMACV General William Westmoreland authority to use the USAF jets stationed in South Vietnam in case of an emergency, and Westmoreland judged the situation to be just that. US planners drafted an extraction plan that carefully orchestrated tactical air support with helicopter landings. On the morning of 24 February, PAVN/VC mortars struck FOB 2. American A-1Es and UH-1B gunships retaliated. Then helicopter transports of the US 52nd Aviation Battalion escorted by 24 USAF F–100 and B–57 jet aircraft arrived. An American on the ground reported that the impact of their heavy ordnance lifted him off the ground and then slammed him back down. The jets suppressed the PAVN/VC and enabled the helicopters to evacuate FOB 2 in three lifts. Meanwhile, the Ranger battalion to the east withdrew back to An Khê.

== Aftermath ==
South Vietnamese casualties from the four days of fighting along Highway 19 numbered 43 dead, 72 wounded, and 58 missing, with 41 individual and five crew-served weapons lost as well. Enemy losses were unknown, but MACV thought they were heavy, mostly from air strikes. Nonetheless, the vital road remained closed to allied traffic.

Behind the shield provided by their blockade of Highway 19, the PAVN/VC continued to expand their control over northern Kon Tum province. On the 22nd, the ARVN 3rd Battalion, 42nd Infantry, ran into an enemy force armed with AK-47s and RPG–2s between Đăk Tô and the Cambodian border. Outclassed, the unit recoiled in disorder. The next day, the regimental commander, Lieutenant colonel Lai Van Chu, personally led a second battalion in a counterattack that captured some of these new weapons. In the process, the ARVN identified their foe as the PAVN 101st Regiment. MACV's strict rules required further confirmation before it would add the unit to its enemy order of battle in South Vietnam.

On 14 March 1965, the ARVN 22nd Division began a weeklong operation to reopen Highway 19. The action allowed the government to deliver supplies by land to the Central Highlands for the first time in six weeks. Trucks moved 1,204 tons of supplies from Qui Nhon to Pleiku. Most of the troops then departed, leaving token garrisons along the route. Henceforth, the allies deemed the road suitable for small convoys, but any significant shipment of valuable materiel required a large escort.
