= Battle of An Ninh =

Part of the Vietnam War (1965)

- Part of Vietnam War
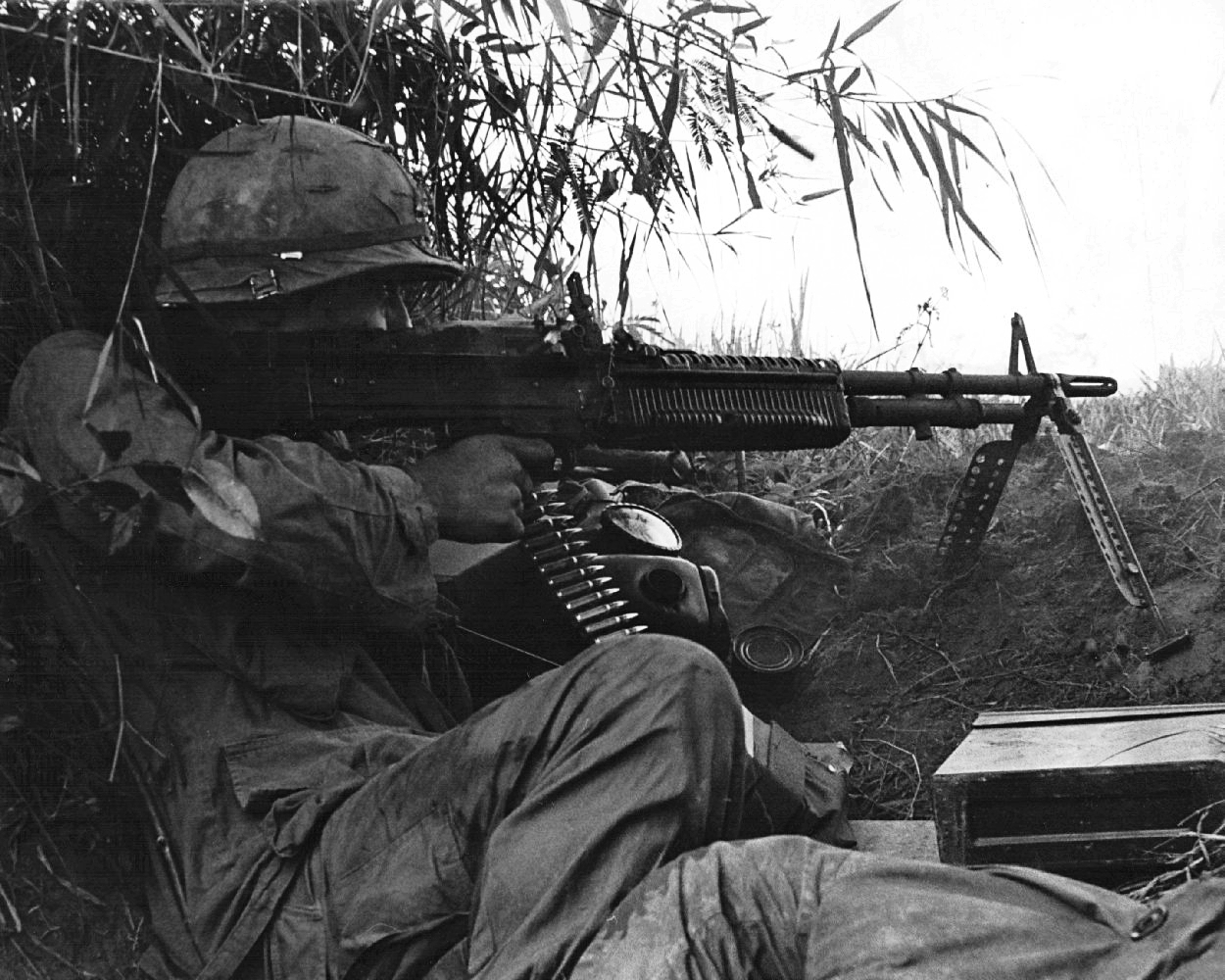
- Sergeant of 502nd Infantry firing an M60 machine gun
Date	18–19 September 1965
Location	An Ninh, An Khê District, Gia Lai Province
Result	see Aftermath

Belligerents
United States; South Vietnam	Viet Cong

Commanders and leaders
Lt Col W.K.G. Smith	

Units involved
(United States) 2nd Battalion, 502nd Infantry Regiment (South Vietnam) Rangers	2nd Regiment, 3rd Division

Casualties and losses
(United States) 13 killed	US body count: 226–257 killed

The Battle of An Ninh took place from 18–19 September 1965 between elements of the Vietcong (VC) 94th and 95th Battalions, 2nd Regiment, 3rd Division and the U.S. 2nd Battalion, 502nd Infantry Regiment and Army of the Republic of Vietnam (ARVN) Rangers. It occurred during an operation codenamed Operation Gibraltar, developed by MACV to clear the area around the 1st Cavalry Division's base at An Khê, South Vietnam.

== Background ==
In August 1965 the 1st Brigade, 101st Airborne Division was tasked with securing the An Khê area in preparation for the arrival of the 1st Cavalry Division. Code-named Operation Highland, it was executed in three phases. In Phase I (22-25 August) elements moved by road, air and sea from Dong Ba Thin Base Camp to the area of operation. The 2nd Battalion, 327th Infantry Regiment flew to An Khê and established a defensive perimeter around the base's airstrip on the 22nd. Over the next two days the rest of the brigade, including the 1st Battalion, 327th Infantry Regiment and the 2nd Battalion, 502nd Infantry Regiment and its heavy equipment arrived by sea at Qui Nhơn and moved to An Khê via Highway 19. Supported by air and artillery strikes, these units carried out Phase II on the 26th, clearing Highway 19 through to An Khê so that convoys could begin to bring 1st Cavalry Division supplies and soldiers to their new base camp. With both Highway 19 and the base camp in hand, Phase III began an aggressive campaign to keep the highway open for convoys and protect the force building the division's base. Between 27 August and 1 October the 1st Brigade carried out 23 Company-size or larger operations, eight of them airmobile assaults, against known or suspected Communist concentrations. Operation Gibraltar was one of a series of attacks under the Highland umbrella.

== Battle ==
At 07:00 on 18 September 1965 the 2/502nd Infantry and an Army of the Republic of Vietnam (ARVN) Ranger company deployed by helicopter into an area near An Ninh, a hamlet 30km east of An Khê and about 14km north of Highway 19. Intelligence sources suggested the presence of an enemy unit in the mountains nearby. The U.S./ARVN force landed in a training base that harbored the Vietcong (VC) 95th Battalion and elements of the 94th Battalion, both part of the 2nd Regiment of the recently formed People’s Army of Vietnam (PAVN) 3rd Division.

The VC did nothing to contest the first group of helicopters, but when the second arrived, fire from small arms, automatic weapons and mortars became so intense that the American commander on the scene, Lieutenant colonel Wilfrid K. G. Smith, had to wave off the rest of the helicopters before all the men could land. As a result, only 224 men were actually on the ground. After some initial confusion, the troops organized a defensive perimeter and began to return fire.

Over the next few hours the VC pressed their attack, throwing the survival of the force into question. Complicating the situation, the Americans had neglected to bring along mortars and recoilless rifles; the battalion commander never considered the possibility that his men could use them in mountain country. Artillery support was unavailable because recent rains had rendered a critical ford impassable and helicopters capable of carrying artillery within range of the battle were flying other missions. Although A-1E Skyraiders had struck the landing zone prior to the insertion, none were available from shortly after 07:30 until 09:00 as the fuel at Bien Hoa Air Base had somehow become contaminated. The force on the ground was thus on its own for almost two hours, encountering enemy fire so intense that it brought down or damaged 26 helicopters during the course of the day. Shortly after 09:00 F-100 Super Sabres finally arrived. Fifty more airstrikes followed as the day lengthened. Smith called in some of the strikes to within 100m of his position and two of his men died in the bombing. But air power did the job and reversed the situation.

A U.S./ARVN relief force began moving into the area by helicopter during the late afternoon. But by the time it had landed and reorganized, night had fallen, making it impossible to travel the final distance overland to assist the beleaguered troops. Setting out early the next day, the group reached the American perimeter by midmorning. By then the fighting had ended. Joined on 20 September by other units approaching from the west, the relief force searched the area but found little. The 1st Brigade shut down Gibraltar on the 21st.

== Aftermath ==
In all, 13 Americans died in the encounter and 28 were wounded. VC losses reportedly ranged from 226 to 257 by body count, most killed by airstrikes. A total of 11,000 artillery rounds and 100 tactical air-strikes were conducted to avert the potential disaster that awaited US forces

It was the first serious firefight between regular forces of the U.S. Army and the VC. The battle was covered by CBS News reporter John Laurence who interviewed the 1st Brigade commander, Colonel James Timothy and paratroopers who had been in the fight. One said their boots were falling apart in the tropical climate and they had eaten corn from the fields because they were out of food. "I was like a proud papa out there," an older sergeant said. "The privates led the charge. The privates went first." "It was a nightmare," a private said. "Nobody slept all night." A sergeant said, "I spent three years in Korea and never saw nothing like this." Laurence witnessed the violent interrogation of an enemy prisoner who had been captured during the battle.

Although soon overshadowed by other events, the battle produced contradictory interpretations. Timothy considered the engagement "particularly significant because it marked the first conquest of a VC Main Force unit by any U.S. Army element in Vietnam.” COMUSMACV General William Westmoreland agreed, terming the operation a "spectacular success." On the other hand, Timothy's operations officer, Major David Hackworth, writing years later, characterized the battle as "most definitely... not… a great victory." commenting that "the VC saved the day by walking away". The operations officer of the 2/327th Infantry, Major Charles W. Dyke, scored it a "disaster" and the product of a "shoddy, ill-conceived plan." In particular, according to Dyke, the number of helicopters assigned to the operation was insufficient, leading to a slow buildup of combat power at the landing zone when speed was essential.
