= Battle of Đức Cơ =

1966 battle of the Vietnam War

- Part of Operation Paul Revere II
Date	August 9–10, 1966
Location	Đức Cơ, Gia Lai Province, South Vietnam
Result	Allied victory

Belligerents
North Vietnam	United States; South Korea

Commanders and leaders
Unknown	Unknown

Units involved
5th Battalion, 88th Regiment	(United States) 1st Platoon, Company A, 1st Battalion, 69th Armor Regiment (Third Republic of Korea) 9th Company, 3rd Battalion, 1st Armored Regiment

Casualties and losses
197 killed	(Third Republic of Korea) 7 killed

The Battle of Đức Cơ or the Battle of Landing Zone 27V was an engagement between the People's Army of Vietnam (PAVN) 5th Battalion of the 88th Regiment alongside the 69th Armor Regiment and 3rd Brigade, 25th Infantry Division with a company of the Republic of Korea Army 3rd Battalion, 1st Armored Regiment, supported by a tank platoon of the 1st Battalion, 69th Armor during the night of August 9–10, 1966. The battle resulted from North Vietnamese attempts to infiltrate Đức Cơ from Cambodia. The battle was regarded as a "victory for American firepower", given the massive deployment of artillery, armoured and aerial firepower against a potential PAVN attack against a defensive perimeter.

== Background ==
The South Korean 3rd Battalion, 1st Armored Regiment, part of the Capital Division (Fierce Tiger), began participating in Operation Paul Revere I on 9 July, establishing its positions to the north of the Chu Pong Massif, immediately east of the hamlet of Plei Girao Kia, eight kilometers south of Đức Cơ. It was under the operational control of the 3rd Brigade, 25th Infantry Division, and conducted near-daily patrols without significant contact with the PAVN. From 27 July, the battalion's 9th Company was stationed at Landing Zone 27V (27 Victor when spoken), six kilometers from the border with Cambodia. A tank platoon from the United States 1st Battalion, 69th Armor, was attached to the company on a weekly rotational basis; the 1st Platoon of the 1st Battalion's Company A was assigned for the week beginning 5 August.

The position at Landing Zone 27V was roughly oblong, extending 200 meters east to west and 170 meters north to south, protected by a two-foot-deep trench, concertina wire about 20 meters outside of the latter, and trip flares and claymore mines farther out. The five M48A3 Patton main battle tanks of the platoon were dispersed among the covered machine gun emplacements and trenches for the infantrymen.

== Engagement ==
On 9 August, the 9th Company had just returned from a two-day mission on the Cambodian border. Its commander sent out three listening posts 200 meters beyond the perimeter before sunset and followed standard Korean procedures by placing half of the men inside the main position on alert. The southwest listening post reported sounds of digging about an hour before midnight, followed by the tripping of a flare on the western side of the perimeter. Predicting a forthcoming attack, the company commander called the listening posts into the main position. When the digging continued, a Patton directed its searchlight towards the noise and fired one of its machine guns, being met with fire from PAVN soldiers in a tree line to the south, supported by mortar fire from the northwest. This slightly wounded three Americans, including the platoon commander, who were caught outside their tanks, but all reached the latter without further injury. The men in the position were fully alerted by this time.

In response to increased PAVN fire, three of the Pattons fired antipersonnel rounds into the tree line, while the remainder fired to the southwest. Two of the tanks were searchlight-equipped, but both were disabled by PAVN fire during the night, after which illumination was provided by artillery flares and United States Air Force flare ships (transport aircraft dropping flares). Artillery support from the 3rd Battalion and from the three American artillery batteries at Duc Co as a result of continued increase in PAVN fire.

The PAVN fire slowed by 01:30 on 10 August but they began an attack after a half hour lull, charging the western side of the perimeter and coming as close as fifty meters before being repulsed by the intense Allied tank and machine gun fire. Two more assaults were launched against the north and south sides of the perimeter during the next two hours, with several PAVN personnel coming within five meters of the position and one penetrating it before being bayoneted. Most of the PAVN personnel were dispatched or retreated, and by 06:00 their fire slackened and then stopped entirely. Soon afterwards, a combined tank-infantry patrol swept beyond the perimeter, encountering multiple PAVN personnel who fought to the death.

== Aftermath ==
During the battle, nearly 1,900 high-explosive rounds were expended by American and South Korean artillery from the 3rd Battalion base and Duc Co. The 9th Company's mortars fire 1,500 rounds, while the Pattons fired 24 high-explosive, 33 90 mm canister, and nearly 17,000 machine gun rounds. Estimated losses for the North Vietnamese was 197, from the 5th Battalion of the 88th Regiment. South Korean losses numbered seven killed, while no American were killed. Subsequent speculation by American intelligence analysts stated that the PAVN attack might have been a diversionary move to draw attention away from their units escaping from Paul Revere II through the Ia Drang Valley and Chu Pong area.
