= Siege of Đắk Đoa =

1954 Vietnamese First Indochina War victory

- Part of the First Indochina War
Date	11–17 February 1954
Location	Đắk Đoa, French Indochina 13°59′38″N 108°06′58″E
Result	Việt Minh victory

Belligerents
French Union: France; French Indochina; State of Vietnam	Democratic Republic of Vietnam: (North Vietnam) Việt Minh

Commanders and leaders
Pierre Chasse	Nguyễn Chánh

Units involved
2 Platoons from G.M. 100	Elements of the 803rd Regiment

Casualties and losses
120 killed	Unknown

The siege of Dak Doa was a military event which took place between 11 and 17 February 1954 during the First Indochina War between elements of a French battle group - Groupement Mobile No. 100 and the Việt Minh. After a seven-day siege the Việt Minh overran and wiped out an outlying French position at Đắk Đoa near Kon Tum.

== Background ==
After the conclusion of the Korean cease-fire in July 1953, the veteran French Bataillon de Corée which had fought with United Nations forces in the Korean War had arrived in Saigon for deployment in the Indochina war. It was expanded into a two battalion regiment and reinforced with two Vietnamese companies. The Bataillon de Corée was activated and formed the nucleus for Groupement Mobile No. 100 ("Group Mobile 100" or G.M. 100) on November 15, 1953. This would become the hard core of the French army in central Indochina.

G.M. 100 moved to a designated area known as Corps Tactical Zone 2 (CTZ2), which was roughly a triangle with corners at Kon Tum, An Khê and the Chu Dreh Pass in the Central Highlands. In January the unit was ordered to reinforce Pleiku, Kon Tum and Cheo Reo which were vital strategic centres in the plateau region. At first the unit was positioned 40 miles northeast of Buôn Ma Thuột and was relied upon to be the backbone for the defence of the region. From there the Mobile Group conducted mopping-up, reinforcement and road clearing operations in the surrounding jungles and mountains. Within days the unit became engaged in combat with the 803rd Việt Minh Regiment in and around the crucial post at Đăk Tô Northwest of Kontum. A post was set up 28 miles to the South West of Kon Tum, at Đắk Đoa with a platoon and subsequently fortified.

== Siege ==
The Việt Minh soon encroached on Đắk Đoa on 2 February. Three days later, the Việt Minh blew up several bridges to north of Kon Tum which made patrolling difficult. French Air support was called in; fighter bombers from airfields in Nha Trang made strafing missions around the besieged post which continued until nightfall.

At the same time, the French High command led by Pierre Chasse saw the perilous situation and decided to abandon Kon Tum for fear of being cut off and surrounded. By February 7 the evacuation of European civilians and Vietnamese civil servants had been completed.

G.M. 100 soon dug in around Pleiku for a last ditch defence of the region. By February 11, they had been fighting for seven days and with the evacuation of Kon Tum this made any reinforcement of Đắk Đoa more difficult. A patrol by G.M. 100 was ambushed in which three were killed and ten wounded. A counter response by the French into the Dan Roia mountain came back with nothing.

On the same day, the Việt Minh launched their first major attack at midnight. Getting as far as the barbed wire perimeter the French opened fire on them, and artillery aided by a light aircraft spotter with flares enabled Grumman Goose planes which had been adapted for ground attack, succeeded in repelling the Viet Minh. The following day two platoons from the Korean Regiment managed to force their way through Việt Minh lines to relive the garrison, and bring the total number up to 130.

The Việt Minh regrouped and continued to bombard the French positions. The road between Pleiku and Đắk Đoa were now under continual harassment. The garrison defences soon became battered; the barbed wire defences were smashed by Bangalore torpedoes and the earth bunkers were the only protection.

On February 17, the Việt Minh launched a major attack carried out just before midnight. During the initial bombardment a lucky strike by a mortar hit the French command post, igniting Jerry cans of petrol, and another took out the electrical generator - this meant that searchlights used to illuminate the area were now defunct. The Việt Minh then launched infantry attacks against the outpost - the battle raged throughout the night, lit up by the flames of the burning command post bunker.

The defenders were exhausted and depleted but the counter battery fire from 1st Korea was kept up. French resistance thus continued for a while. The Việt Minh however soon were in the forward positions and started overrunning the French. Nevertheless, radio communication was still getting through to headquarters around 3am when a message was received stating that half of the post had been overrun.

Finally, radio communication with the post went silent around 4am. After the battle, walkie-talkies in the area picked up someone whistling the La Marseillaise among the smoking ruins – the identity remains unknown.

== Aftermath ==
1st Korea hoped to launch a push to recover the outpost and see if there were any survivors but were frustrated when orders were received to break out of Pleuku. A wounded prisoner managed to make it back to the 1st Korea lines, and severely wounded prisoners were left on the road by the Việt Minh for the French to pick up. A reconnaissance force headed towards Đắk Đoa but nothing was found. The rear platoon however was badly shot up in an ambush which cost 1st Korea further thirty men.

Casualties were heavy for G.M. 100; 120 in total had died including thirty of their Vietnamese allies. Only six wounded survivors made it back to French lines.

In March 1954, the Battle of Dien Bien Phu had started in Tonkin, G.M 100 was again under siege at various locations in the Central Highlands. Battles were fought in and around Pleiku, Kon Tum, Dak To and Ankhe. After the defeat at Dien Bien Phu in May the French began to abandon their isolated position in the Central Highlands. This was code named Opération Églantine during this period G.M. 100 had taken a severe battering with constant ambushes. By the end of June the unit was lured into bigger ambush - at Mang Yang Pass near An Khê where it was severely defeated in one of the worst French defeats of the war. Another ambush at Chu Dreh Pass effectively wiped out the unit in July.

== Bibliography ==
- Clodfelter, Micheal (2017). Warfare and Armed Conflicts A Statistical Encyclopedia of Casualty and Other Figures, 1492-2015, 4th Ed. McFarland, Incorporated, Publishers. ISBN 9780786474707.
- Davidson, Phillip B (1991). Vietnam at War The History, 1946-1975. Oxford University Press. p. 9780195067927.
- Eggleston, Michael A (2017). Dak To and the Border Battles of Vietnam, 1967-1968 McFarland. McFarland, Incorporated, Publishers. ISBN 9781476664170.
- Fall, Bernard (2005). Street Without Joy: The French Debacle in Indochina. Stackpole Military History. ISBN 9780811732369.
- Mesko, Jim (1985). Riverine A Pictorial History of the Brown Water War in Vietnam. Squadron/Signal Publications. ISBN 9780897471633.

Journals

- Luedeke, Kirk A (January–February 2001). "Death on the Highway: The Destruction of Groupement Mobile 100'". Armor Magazine.
