= Operation Circle Pines =

1966 US-South Vietnamese operation

Date	March 29 - April 5, 1966
Location	Ho Bo Woods, Vietnam 11°3′16.44″N 106°40′46.06″E

Belligerents
United States Army	Viet Cong

Commanders and leaders
MG Frederick Weyand	

Units involved
25th Infantry Division -5th Infantry Regiment -27th Infantry Regiment -69th Armor Regiment	

Casualties and losses
36 killed, 195 wounded	170 killed
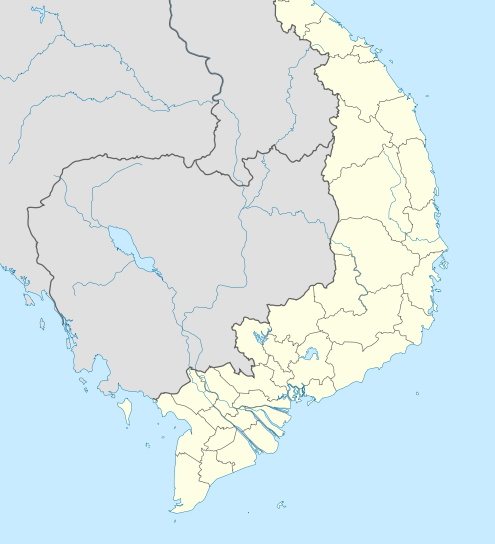
- Location within South Vietnam

Operation Circle Pines was a U.S.-South Vietnamese search-and-destroy operation conducted in Bình Dương and Hậu Nghĩa provinces of South Vietnam from 29 March to 5 April 1966. It was carried out by the 25th Infantry Division along with ARVN South Vietnamese forces. The operation focused on the Filhol Rubber Plantation and the Hố Bò woods, northwest of Saigon that was used by Viet Cong forces as a base and supply area.

The 5th Infantry Regiment was initially sent into the area of Củ Chi and the Hố Bò woods and the Filhol Rubber Plantation which had been the target of Operation Crimp in January 1966 and was known to contain tunnel networks. The regiment found the jungle terrain difficult and discovered a large underground tunnel network as well as equipment and supplies.

Elements of the 27th Infantry Regiment were also sent into the area and on April 4-5 came under a large Viet Cong attack, which they were able to repel.

Throughout the operation, M113 Armored Personnel Carriers and tanks from the 69th Armor Regiment supported the infantry providing protection as well as clearing paths through the jungle. The operation disproved critics who said that armored vehicles could not be used in the jungle of Vietnam.

US troops suffered 32 killed and 195 wounded, while the Viet Cong 170 killed and 8 captured.
