= Landing Zone Oasis =

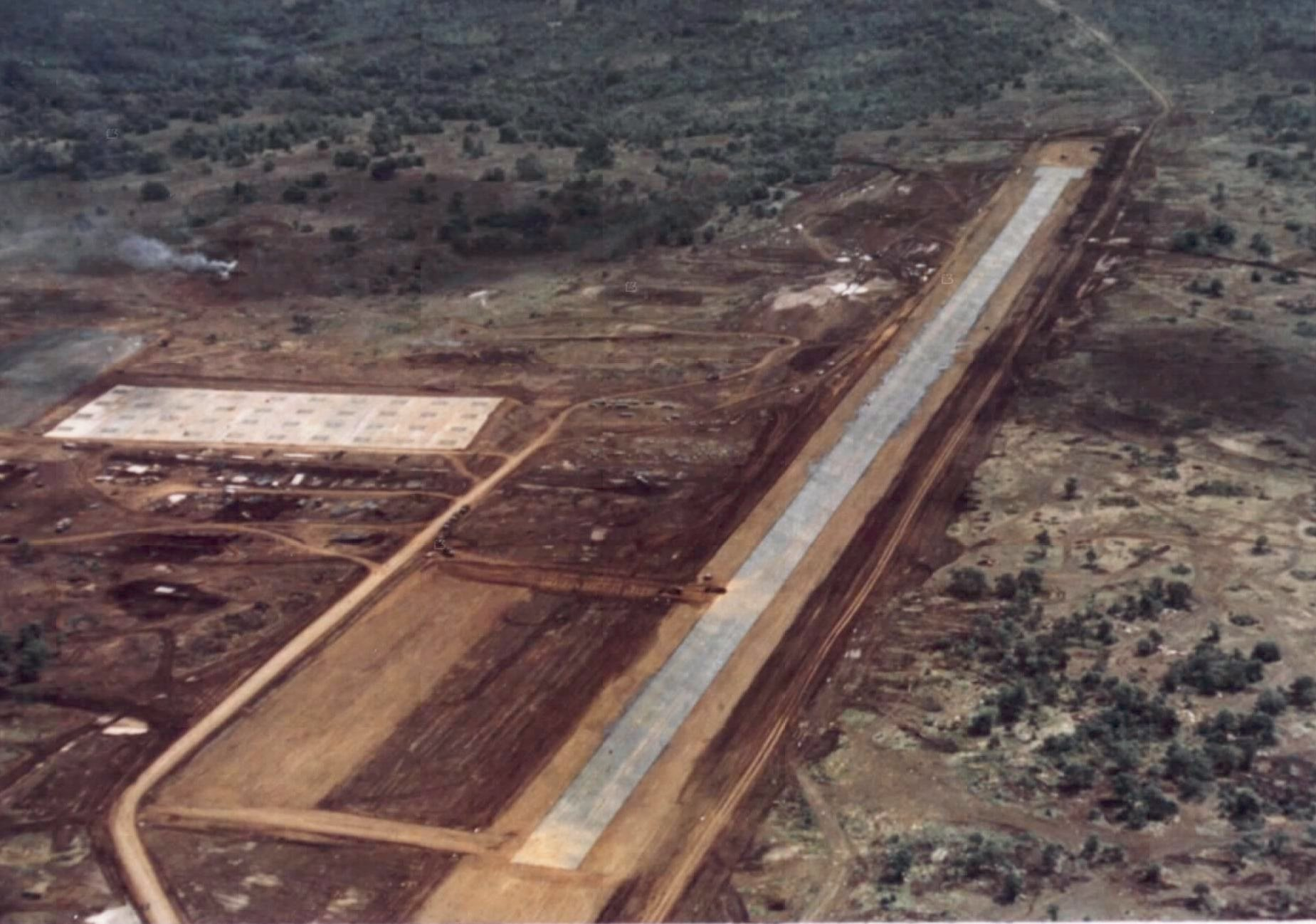
- An aerial view of the landing zone in April 1967

Site information
- Type: Army Base

Location
- Coordinates: 13.805°N 107.872°E

Site history
- Built: 1965
- In use: 1966-71
- Battles/wars: Vietnam War

Garrison information
- Occupants: 1st Cavalry Division; 25th Infantry Division; 4th Infantry Division

Oasis Airfield
- IATA: none; ICAO: none

Summary
- Elevation AMSL: 1,770 ft (540 m)

Runways
Direction	Length		Surface
Direction	ft	m	Surface
	3,500	1,067	laterite

Landing Zone Oasis (also known as LZ Oasis or LZ Tuttle) is a former U.S. Army base southwest of Pleiku in central Vietnam.

== History ==
The base was first established in 1965 by the 1st Cavalry Division for the Battle of Ia Drang, just south of QL-19 and approximately 24 km southwest of Pleiku. The base was originally named after SSGT Arlen Tuttle, an Engineer from the 8th Engineer Battalion, 1st Cavalry Division who was killed in action on 5 November 1965.

The base was reopened in May 1966 by Task Force Walker of the 25th Infantry Division.

The base was later used by the 3rd Brigade, 4th Infantry Division.

On 11 May 1969 the base was attacked by an estimated 600 People's Army of Vietnam (PAVN) troops, resulting in 11 U.S. and approximately 100 PAVN killed and 3 U.S. captured.

On 30 October 1970 the base, occupied by 6th Battalion, 14th Artillery and elements of B Battery, 4th Battalion, 60th Artillery, was attacked by the PAVN, resulting in 3 U.S. deaths and 20 U.S. wounded.

Other units stationed at Oasis included:

- 1st Squadron, 10th Cavalry Regiment
- 7th Battalion, 15th Artillery (April–October 1971)
- 69th Armor Regiment (September 1968 – 1970)
- 165th Aviation Group
- 5/22 Artillery (8" & 175mm SP) 1968

The base was abandoned by U.S. forces in late 1971.
