= Operation Kalamazoo =

Mission during the Vietnam War

Date	April 13-14, 1966
Location	Hố Bò woods 11°3′16.44″N 106°40′46.06″E

Belligerents
U.S. Army	Viet Cong

Units involved
25th Infantry Division -5th Infantry Regiment -69th Armor Regiment	

Casualties and losses
7 killed, 27 wounded	9 killed, 15 prisoners
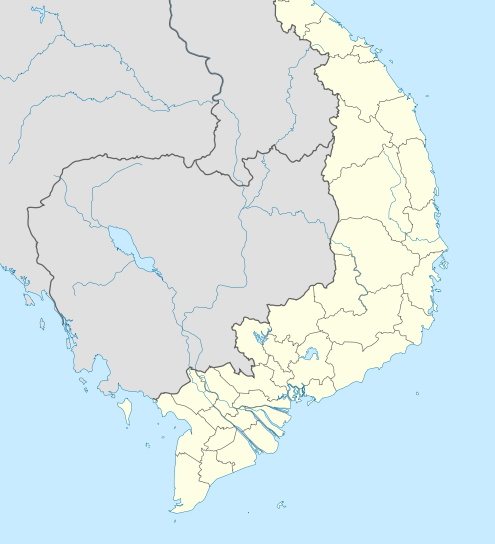
- Location within South Vietnam

Operation Kalamazoo (sometimes called Operation Keana) was a search and destroy mission during the Vietnam War led by Task Force GREER composed of elements of the 5th Infantry Regiment of the 25th Infantry Division supported by 69th Armor Regiment in the Hố Bò woods area on 13–14 April 1966.

The operation's goal was to destroy Viet Cong forces in the Hố Bò woods near the Filhol Plantation. The mechanized task force moved into the woods early on 13 April and met little initial resistance, but the deeper they went, the more resistance they faced including automatic weapons, rifle grenades, mortars, RPGs, tunnels, booby traps, and extensive minefields.

The American forces deployed M113 armored personnel carriers (APC), tanks and a vehicle recovery track and helicopter gunships against the enemy forces. At the conclusion, the task force identified Rach Son Creek, north of the area as a newly discovered tunnel system.

The operation ended with 9 enemy killed and 15 prisoners and the destruction of weapons, supplies, tunnels and buildings used by the enemy. The task force suffered 7 killed (mainly from B Company, 1st Battalion) and 27 wounded. Additionally, four APCs were damaged, primarily by mines.
