= Battle of Mang Yang Pass =

Battle in the First Indochina War

- Part of the First Indochina War
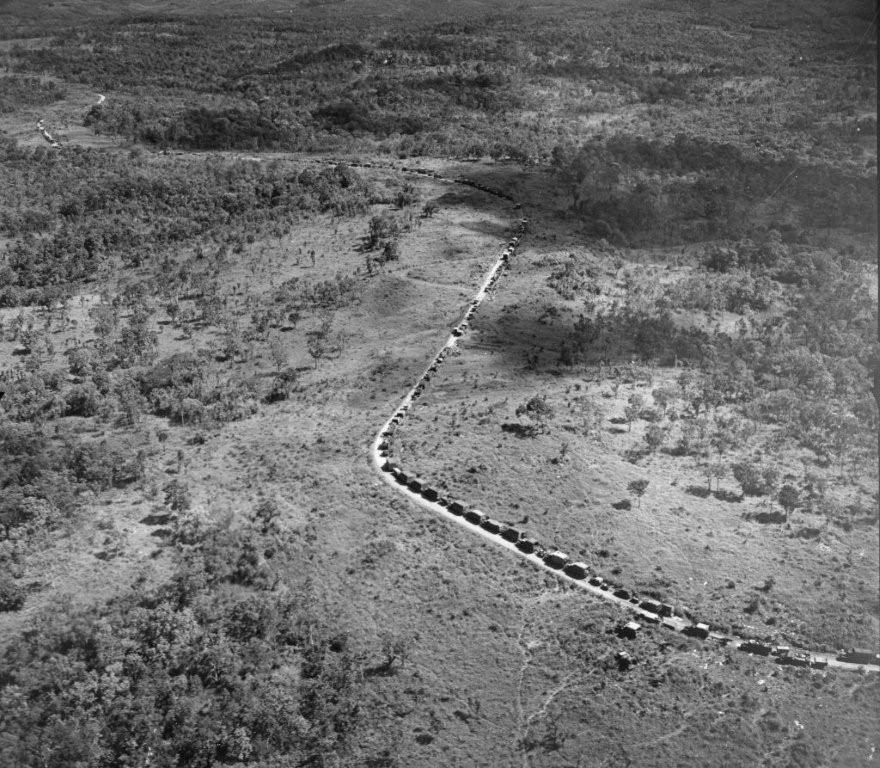
- Aerial view of the ambushed 100th Mobile Group column near An Khê
Date	24–29 June 1954
Location	Mang Yang, Vietnam 14°00′N 108°15′E
Result	Việt Minh victory

Belligerents
French Union: France; French Indochina; State of Vietnam	Democratic Republic of Vietnam: (North Vietnam) Việt Minh

Commanders and leaders
Pierre Chasse	Nguyễn Minh Châu

Strength
3,500 troops	2 battalions 2 weapon companies of 96th Regiment; 700 men

Casualties and losses
500+	At least: 100 killed 200 wounded
- Location within Vietnam

The Battle of Mang Yang Pass (also known as the Battle of An Khê or the Battle of Đắk Pơ) was one of the last battles of the First Indochina War between the French Union and Việt Minh which took place from 24 to 29 June 1954. The battle was one of the bloodiest defeats of the French Union forces, along with the battle of Dien Bien Phu shortly beforehand.

== Background ==
The 100th Mobile Group was a regimental task force unit of the French Far East Expeditionary Corps which was assembled as a convoy. It included the elite French Battalion which fought in the Korean War at the battles of Chipyong-ni, Wonju and Heartbreak Ridge. It had already suffered a defeat at the Siege of Đắk Đoa in February 1954. In addition, anxious to avoid a second disaster like the siege at Dien Bien Phu, the French Chief of Staff ordered the 100th Mobile Group to abandon their isolated position in the Central Highlands. This was code named opération Églantine.

== Ambush ==
On 24 June 1954, the 100th Mobile Group received orders to abandon its defensive positions at An Khê and fall back to Pleiku, some 80 kilometres (50 mi) away over Route Coloniale 19. At the road marker 'Kilometer 15' the column was ambushed by Việt Minh troops belonging to the 803rd Regiment and suffered heavy losses. The remains of the 100th Mobile Group managed to break through the ambush. The remnants of the 100th Mobile Group, now with the 42nd Mobile Group and the 1st Airborne Group, had to drive through 30 kilometres (19 mi) of Viet Minh controlled road. The column was ambushed again on 28 June and 29 at Dak Ya-Ayun by the Việt Minh 108th Regiment, suffering heavy losses. The survivors finally reached Pleiku the following day.

In five days of fighting, the 100th Mobile Group lost 85 percent of its vehicles, all of its artillery, 68 percent of its signal equipment and half of its crew-served weapons. The group's headquarters company had only 84 men left out of an original 222. The 43rd Colonial Infantry Regiment's Marching Battalion and 1st and 2nd Korean Battalions, which numbered about 834 men each, were now mustered at roll call with 452, 497, and 345 men respectively. The 2nd Group of the 10th Colonial Artillery Regiment, reduced to fighting as infantry after the loss of all of their guns, had shrunk from 475 men to 215 men during the fighting. Colonel Barrou and several men were taken as prisoners of war. The Việt Minh's 96th Regiment suffered more than 100 killed in comparison.

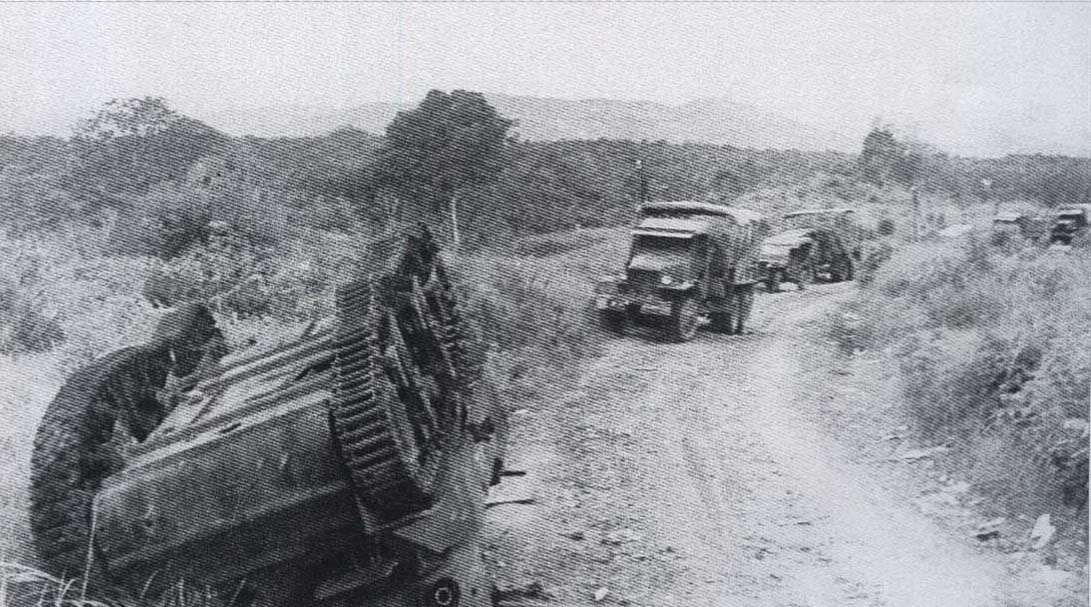
French vehicles lay abandoned or destroyed. An M8 75 mm howitzer motor carriage is overturned on left

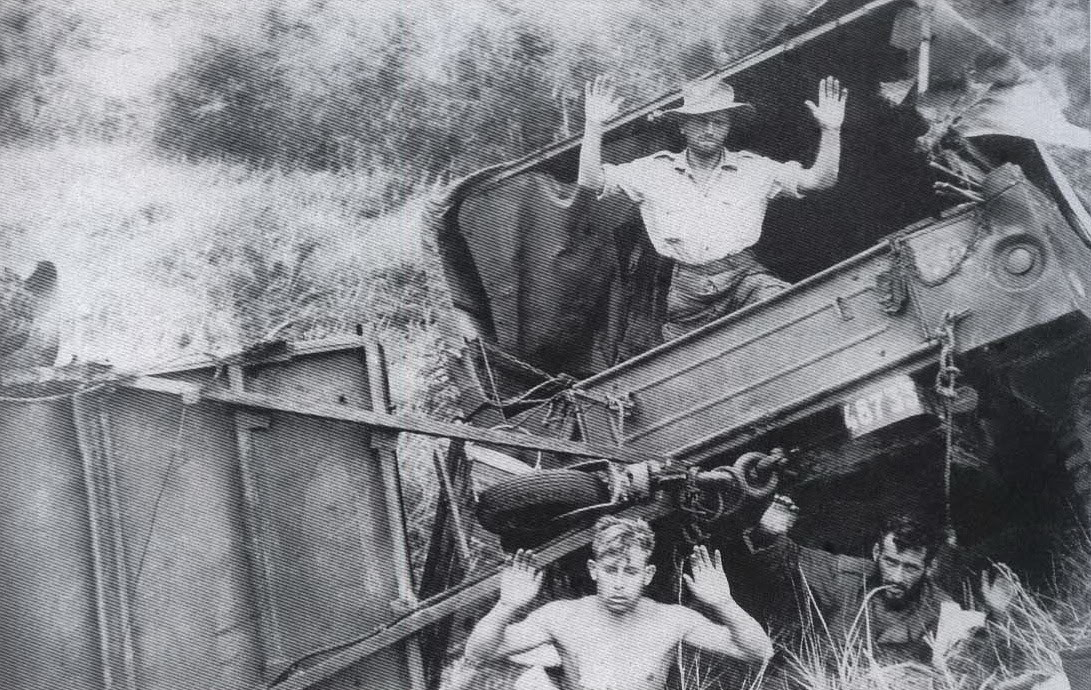
Dazed French troops surrender to the Viet Minh during the ambush

== Aftermath ==
On 29 June the remains of 1st Korea Battalion was ordered to take part in Operation Myosotis to open Route Coloniale 14 between Pleiku and Ban Mê Thuột which was over 96 kilometers away. On 17 July the column was ambushed at Chu Dreh Pass by local units of the Việt Minh 96th Regiment. When the survivors finally arrived at Ban Mê Thuột the following day, there were only 107 men remaining out of 452, of those 53 were wounded, in addition a further 47 vehicles were lost. Three days after the ambush at Chu-Dreh the Geneva agreements were signed. On 1 August an armistice went into effect.

== Order of battle ==
=== French Union forces ===
French mobile groups were designed as self-sustaining motorized regimental task force units modelled on the U.S. Army's World War II-era regimental combat teams. Mobile groups typically consisted of three infantry battalions with one artillery battalion, along with elements of light armor or tanks, engineer, signal and medical assets, totaling 3,000–3,500 soldiers.

Units in the 100th Mobile Group included:

- The Korean Regiment, comprising the 1st and 2nd Korean Battalions which were formed from the elite French Battalion.
- The 43rd Colonial Infantry Regiment's Marching Battalion.
- The 520th TDKQ (Tiểu-đoàn Khinh-quân), a light battalion of the Vietnamese National Army then part of An Khê garrison.
- The 10th Colonial Artillery Regiment's 2nd Group.
- The 3rd Squadron of 5th "Royal Poland" Armored Cavalry Regiment which was in reserve at Pleiku when the 100th Mobile Group left An Khê

=== Việt Minh forces ===
The Việt Minh 96th Regiment included:

- 40th Battalion (three infantry companies).
- 79th Battalion (two infantry companies).
- Two weapon companies (mortars, recoilless guns and bomb-launchers).

== In popular culture ==
The opening scene of the movie We Were Soldiers – about the Ia Drang valley battle in Nov. 1965 – alludes to the destruction of Groupement Mobile 100. The US troops started out of An Khê as well, where they had established Camp Radcliff.

The battle is referred to in the novel Incident at Muc Wa and depicted, but not identified, in its movie adaptation Go Tell the Spartans.

== Sources ==
- Fall, Bernard, Street Without Joy: The French Debacle in Indochina. Stackpole Military History, 1961, ISBN 0-8117-3236-3
- Summers Jr., Harry G. Historical Atlas of the Vietnam War. 1995 ISBN 0-395-72223-3
- Kirk A. Luedeke, Death on the Highway: The Destruction of Groupement Mobile 100. Armor Magazine, January–February 2001, pp. 22–29.
- Từ Điện Biên Phủ đến Bắc Tây Nguyên. Trung đoàn 96 – trận tiêu diệt binh đoàn cơ động 100 của Pháp. NXB Quân đội Nhân dân, 1995. (From Dien Bien Phu to Northern Central Highland – The 96th Regiment and the battle which destroyed the French Groupement Mobile 100. People's Army Publishing House, 1995).
- Turner, Robert F. (1975). Vietnamese Communism: Its Origins and Development. Stanford: Hoover Institution Publications. ISBN 978-0-8179-1431-8.
