= Đak Đoa =

Đak Đoa Xã Đak Đoa
- Commune
- Đak Đoa commune
- Location within Vietnam
- Coordinates: 13°59′38″N 108°06′58″E
- Country: Vietnam
- Region: Central Highlands
- Province: Gia Lai
- Time zone: UTC+7 (UTC + 7)

Đak Đoa is a commune (xã) of Gia Lai Province, Vietnam. It was the location of the Siege of Đắk Đoa in February 1954 between French and Viet Minh forces.
