= Đức Cơ district =

Đức Cơ district Huyện Đức Cơ
- Rural district
- Seal
- Nickname: "The Border Lover" (Người tình biên ải)
- Location in Gia Lai province.
- Country: Vietnam
- Region: Central Highlands
- Province: Gia Lai province
- Existence: 1957 to August 30, 2025
- Central hall: No.116, Quang Trung road, Chư Ty township

Government
  - Type: Rural district
  - People Committee's Chairman: Vũ Định Mạnh
  - People Council's Chairman: Phạm Văn Cường
  - Front Committee's Chairman: Rơ Châm H’Phíp
  - Party Committee's Secretary: Phạm Văn Cường

Area
  - Total: 721.86 km^{2} (278.71 sq mi)

Population (31/12/2024)
  - Total: 88,090
  - Density: 122.0/km^{2} (316.1/sq mi)
- Time zone: UTC+7 (Indochina Time)
- ZIP code: 61500 (Note: An official code from 2024 to 2025.)
- Website: ducco.gialai.gov.vn

Đức Cơ is a former rural district of Gia Lai province in the Central Highlands region of Vietnam.

== History ==
=== 21st century ===
To meet the criteria of the plan for arrangement and merger of administrative units, according to the Decision of the Gia Lai Provincial People's Committee, which was issued in February 2025, from June 12 of the same year, Đức Cơ Rural District was officially dissolved.

== Geography ==
As of 2003 the district had a population of 49,745. The majority of the native Jarai people, followed by the Kinh people. In the early 2000s, even the number of Kinh people continuously decreased due to the wrong economic policies of the local government, causing young people to leave elsewhere.

The district covers an area of 717 km², that is, it is equivalent to Singapore Island. The district capital lies at Chư Ty.

== Culture ==
Đức Cơ is located in the position of the strongest flowing water of the Se San basin, so it has been renovated into the most important hydroelectric lake of the Indochina junction. This project has quickly became a tourist landscape what was not to be missed.

This district was planned to be the center of the Development Triangle Project until Cambodia announced a retreat in 2024.
