= Paul S. Williams Jr. =

United States Army officer (born 1929)

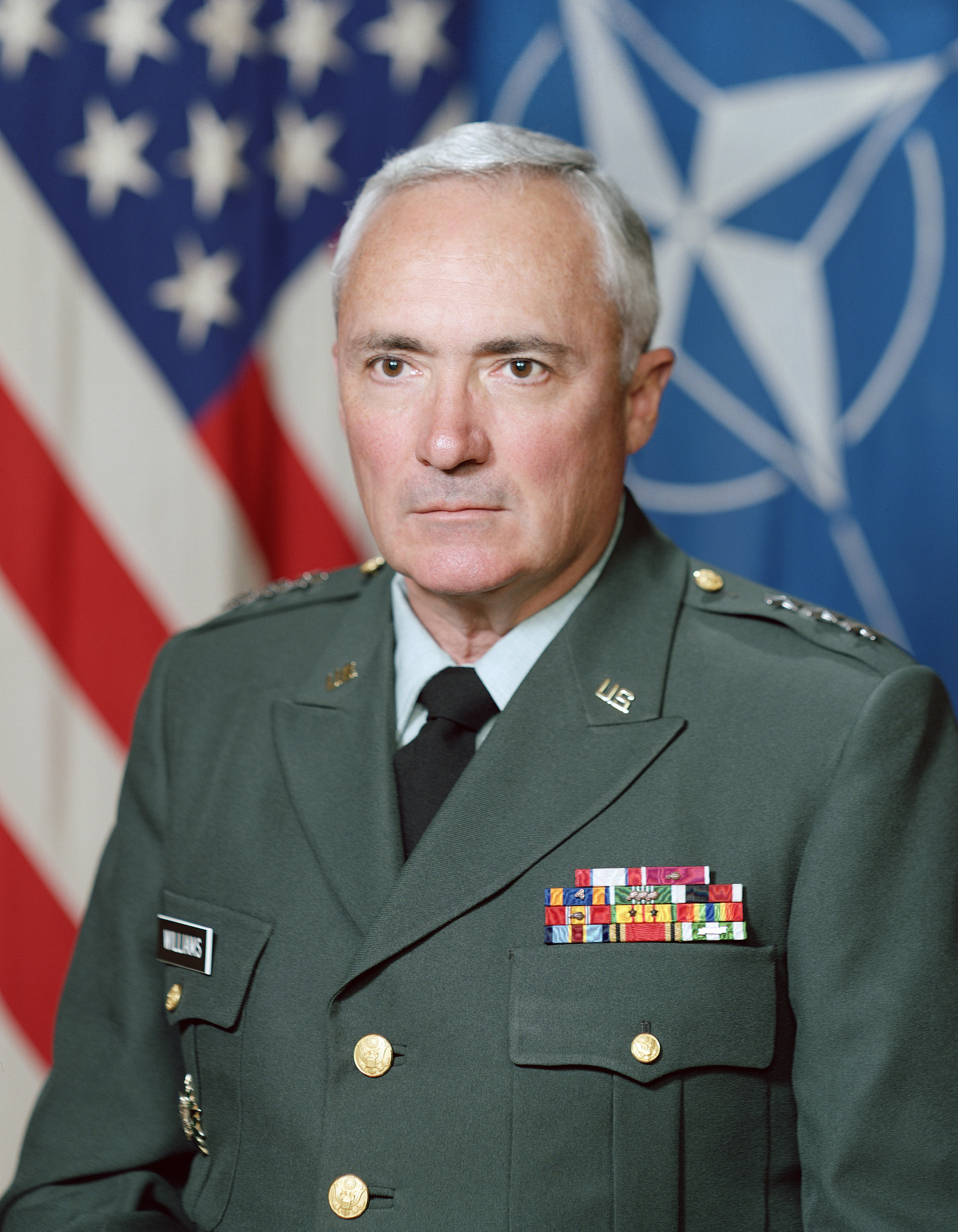
- Nickname: Bo
- Born: October 17, 1929; Richmond, Virginia, U.S.
- Died: July 8, 1995 (aged 65) Lewes, Delaware, U.S.
- Allegiance: United States of America
- Branch: United States Army
- Service years: 1951–1986
- Rank: Lieutenant general
- Commands: V Corps; 1st Cavalry Division
- Conflicts: Vietnam War
- Awards: Distinguished Service Medal; Legion of Merit (2); Air Medal (4)

Paul Scott "Bo" Williams Jr. (October 17, 1929 – July 8, 1995) was a United States Army officer. He retired from active duty in 1986 having achieved the rank of lieutenant general. After retiring from the Army, Bo was active in the family investment organization, Brown and Hoff Partnership. In addition he served on the board of the Goodwin House, a nonprofit senior living community, and the Grafton School, a 24-hour support service provider.

== Early life ==
Bo was born in Richmond, Virginia in 1929 to Paul Scott Williams Sr. and Daisy Brown. At a young age his mother and father separated, and Daisy returned with Bo to her hometown of Manassas, Virginia.

== Military career ==
Bo graduated from the Virginia Military Institute (VMI) in 1951 with a Bachelor of Arts degree in history. At VMI he was a member of the Officer of the Guard Association, president of the International Relations Club, and president of the Virginia Intercollegiate International Relations Club. He graduated as a Distinguished Military Student.

In 1951, Bo attended the Armor Officer Basic Course at Fort Knox, Kentucky. From there he was assigned to the 759th Tank Battalion, 5th Infantry Division in Germany, where he served as a platoon leader in both a tank and reconnaissance platoon, eventually becoming a company commander. From 1955 to 1957 he was the A Company commander of the 894th Tank Battalion at Fort Knox, Kentucky. After attending the Career Course he was assigned to the Eighth U.S. Army in Korea Headquarters, where he was operations officer, Combined Operations for Military Intelligence, G-2 Section.

In 1958, Bo was assigned to Harvard College as an assistant professor of military science. In 1961 he was selected by the military as the American student representative to the Indian Defense Services Staff College in Wellington, India. After a year in India, he became the personnel management officer in Armor Branch at The Pentagon in Arlington, Virginia (1962–1965).

In 1966, he received orders to go to the Republic of Vietnam. Initially, he served as the chief of the Officer Personnel Management Branch, G-1, Headquarters, USARV. In March 1967, he was given command of the 1st Battalion, 69th Armor, 4th Infantry Division. He returned home to Arlington, Virginia from Vietnam in September 1967. After Vietnam, Bo was selected to attend the United States Army War College in Carlisle, Pennsylvania, where he earned a master's degree in strategic studies.

From 1969 to 1970, he was commanding officer of the 2nd (St. Lo) Brigade, 2nd Armored Division at Fort Hood, Texas. In 1970, he became assistant chief of staff, G-3, III Corps at Fort Hood, Texas. In 1972, Bo was assigned to the United States Army Military Personnel Center as the Chief of the Armor Branch, Officer Personnel Directorate. Bo was promoted to brigadier general in 1973 and given command of the 2nd Reserve Officers Training Corps Region in Fort Knox, Kentucky. During his tenure at the Officers Training Corps, he was the commissioning officer for VMI's Class of 1974 Army ROTC Cadets. From 1974 to 1977 he was the director of military personnel management, Office of the Deputy Chief of Staff for Personnel at the Pentagon.

After serving as deputy commander of III Corps (United States), he was promoted to major general, and given command of the 1st Cavalry Division (United States) at Fort Hood, Texas. In 1981, he was promoted to lieutenant general after receiving command of V Corps, U.S. Army Europe. At that time, V Corps Headquarters was in Frankfurt, Germany. There he participated in the Mutual and Balanced Force Reduction talks in Vienna, and was the co-chairman for the Senior NATO Logistics Conference. His last assignment was as the deputy chairman of the North Atlantic Treaty Organization in Brussels, Belgium.

== Awards and decorations ==
During his career, Bo received the Army Distinguished Service Medal, Legion of Merit with one Oak Leaf Cluster, the Air Medal (four awards) the Army Commendation Medal with three Oak Leaf Clusters, and a Purple Heart from injuries suffered in Vietnam.

== Personal ==
After his death from heart failure at the Beebe Medical Center, Bo Williams was interred with full military honors at Arlington National Cemetery on July 18, 1995. He was survived by his wife, Elizabeth Ann "Betty" (Calder) Williams of Manassas, Virginia and Rehoboth Beach, Delaware; two daughters; a son; and two grandchildren. His wife was interred with him on April 26, 2002. An additional four grandchildren were born during the time between their deaths.
