= Hố Bò woods =

External image
- Map of the Ho Bo Woods

Hố Bò woods are located in Bình Dương Province 20 km north of Củ Chi, 4 km to the west of the Iron Triangle and the Saigon River and some 56 km northwest of Saigon. The woods consist of rubber plantations, sparse to dense woods, and open rice paddies with some extremely large dikes, some 1–2 metres high. The woods were used by the Viet Cong (VC) as a base area during the Vietnam War.

During Operation Circle Pines from 29 March to 5 April 1966, the 1st Battalion, 5th Infantry Regiment attacked the woods and discovered that the VC had built extensive bunker and tunnels systems with some of the tunnels three or four levels deep. Eight days later, during Operation Kalamazoo, the same regiment would return to clear the same tunnel system, and discover another one to the north at Rach Son Creek.

On 19 July 1966 1st Platoon, Company A, 1st Battalion, 27th Infantry Regiment (25th Infantry Division) was dropped at a landing zone (11.0916°N 106.4438°E) in the woods where it was met by sniper fire, another platoon was dropped into a nearby landing zone (11.0917°N 106.430°E) to support the 1st Platoon and it too was heavily engaged by VC fire. Several hours later an additional platoon was dropped into each landing zone and by 16:30 the 1st Platoon was extracted under fire. U.S. losses for the action were 25 killed and 24 wounded. The following day, the 1st Battalion, 5th Mechanized Infantry was sent from Củ Chi Base Camp to recover the bodies of 15 soldiers that had been left behind in the previous day's battle. The bodies were found neatly lined up but stripped of all weapons and equipment. On 10 June 2013 the 1/27th Infantry was awarded a Presidential Unit Citation for its actions on 19 July 1966.

In 1973 the Ho Bo area was flat, almost featureless terrain, laced with trenches and tunnels, deeply pocked with ragged lines of bomb craters left by numberless waves of B-52s, its shattered plantations overgrown with head-high weeds and dense brush. Nearly 10 years of battle littered defaced the countryside, and a tangle of tank-tread marks gave it the appearance of an abandoned armored training ground. Hidden beneath were the bunkers and fighting positions of several People's Army of Vietnam main force units, the principal occupant being the 101st Infantry Regiment which had first entered the southern battlefield in 1966 from North Vietnam and had been a more or less constant resident of the Tây Ninh-Hậu Nghĩa -Bình Dương region since then.
