= 17th Field Artillery Regiment =

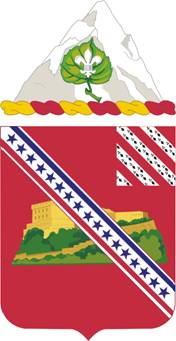
- Coat of arms
- Active: 1916
- Country: (United States)
- Branch: United States Army
- Type: Field artillery
- Role: USARS parent regiment
- Size: Regiment
- Motto: In Time of Peace Prepare For War
- Engagements: World War I; World War II; Tunisia Campaign; Allied Invasion of Sicily; Italian Campaign; Operation Dragoon; Rhineland Campaign; Battle of the Bulge; Central Europe Campaign; Korean War; Vietnam War; War on terror

Commanders
- Notable commanders: John E. Sloan

Insignia
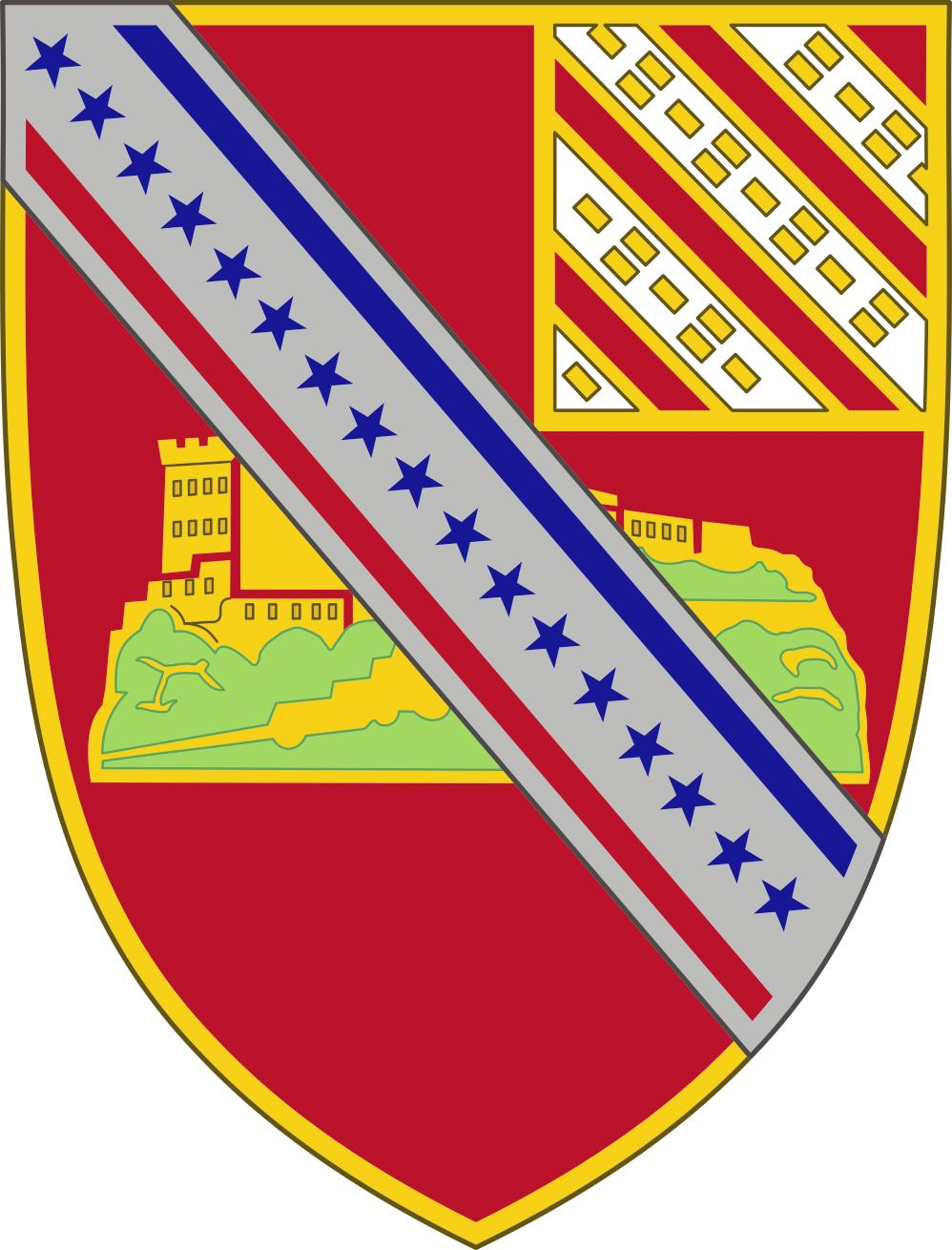
- Distinctive unit insignia

The 17th Field Artillery Regiment is a field artillery regiment of the United States Army first formed in 1916.

== History ==
The 17th Field Artillery was constituted 1 July 1916 in the Regular Army at Camp Robinson, Wisconsin.

== Current Status of Regimental Elements ==
- 1st Battalion, 17th Field Artillery Regiment: Active, assigned to the 3rd Multi-Domain Task Force (3MDTF), U.S. Army Pacific (USARPAC).
- 2nd Battalion, 17th Field Artillery Regiment: Active, assigned to the 2nd Stryker Brigade Combat Team, 7th Infantry Division
- 3rd Battalion, 17th Field Artillery Regiment: Inactive
- 4th Battalion, 17th Field Artillery Regiment: Inactive
- 5th Battalion, 17th Field Artillery Regiment: Inactive
- 6th Battalion, 17th Field Artillery Regiment: Inactive
- 7th Battalion, 17th Field Artillery Regiment: Inactive
- 8th Battalion, 17th Field Artillery Regiment: Inactive

== Lineage and honors ==
- Constituted 1 July 1916 in the Regular Army as the 17th Field Artillery
- Organized 6 June 1917 at Camp Robinson, Wisconsin.
- Assigned 21 September 1917 to the 2d Division.
- Relieved 18 December 1920 from assignment to the 2d Division.
- Assigned 22 July 1929 to the 1st Division.
- Relieved 1 January 1930 from assignment to the 1st Division and assigned to the 2d Division.
- Relieved 16 October 1939 from assignment to the 2d Division.
- Regiment broken up 14 February - 1 March 1944 and its elements reorganized and redesignated as follows:

Headquarters and Headquarters Battery on 1 March 1944 as Headquarters and Headquarters Battery, 17th Field Artillery Group.
1st Battalion on 1 March 1944 as the 17th Field Artillery Battalion.
2d Battalion on 14 February 1944 as the 630th Field Artillery Battalion.

After 1 March 1944 the above units underwent changes as follows:
Headquarters and Headquarters Battery, 17th Field Artillery Group, inactivated 27 February 1946 at Camp Kilmer, New Jersey.
Activated 20 December 1948 at Fort Sill, Oklahoma.
Redesignated 25 June 1958 as Headquarters and Headquarters Battery, 17th Artillery Group.

17th Field Artillery Battalion inactivated 16 April 1946 at Camp Kilmer, New Jersey.
Activated 1 August 1946 at Fort Sill, Oklahoma.
Inactivated 1 June 1958 in Korea.

630th Field Artillery Battalion inactivated 22 February 1946 at Camp Kilmer, New Jersey.
Redesignated 5 February 1947 as the 537th Field Artillery Battalion.
Activated 1 October 1948 at Camp Carson, Colorado.
Inactivated 25 June 1958 at Fort Sill, Oklahoma.

- Headquarters and Headquarters Battery, 17th Artillery Group, and the 17th and 537th Field Artillery Battalions consolidated, reorganized, and redesignated 31 July 1959 as the 17th Artillery, a parent regiment under the Combat Arms Regimental System.
- Redesignated 1 September as the 17th Field Artillery.
- Withdrawn 16 July 1988 from the Combat Arms Regimental System and reorganized under the United States Army Regimental System.

== Campaign participation credit ==
- World War I: Aisne; Aisne-Marne; St. Mihiel; Meuse-Argonne; Lorraine 1918; Île-de-France 1918
- World War II: Tunisia; Sicily (with arrowhead); Naples-Foggia; Rome-Arno; Southern France; Rhineland; Ardennes-Alsace; Central Europe
- Korean War: UN Defensive; UN Offensive; CCF Intervention; First UN Counteroffensive; CCF Spring Offensive; UN Summer-Fall Offensive; Second Korean Winter; Korea, Summer-Fall 1952; Third Korean Winter; Korea, Summer 1953
- Vietnam: Defense; Counteroffensive; Counteroffensive, Phase II; Counteroffensive, Phase III; Tet Counteroffensive; Counteroffensive, Phase IV; Counteroffensive, Phase V; Counteroffensive, Phase VI; Tet 69/Counteroffensive; Summer-Fall 1969; Winter-Spring 1970; Sanctuary Counteroffensive; Counteroffensive, Phase VII
- Southwest Asia: Defense of Saudi Arabia; Liberation and Defense of Kuwait
- Operation Iraqi Freedom
- Global War on Terrorism Expeditionary

=== Decorations ===
- Presidential Unit Citation (Army) for PLEIKU PROVENCE
- Valorous Unit Award for IRAQ
- French Croix de Guerre with Palm, World War I for AISNE-MARNE
- French Croix de Guerre with Palm, World War I for MEUSE-ARGONNE
- French Croix de Guerre, World War I, Fourragere
- French Croix de Guerre with Silver-Gilt Star, World War II for ROME-ARNO
- Meritorious Unit Citation, Operation Iraqi Freedom, 2006

== Heraldry ==
=== Distinctive unit insignia ===
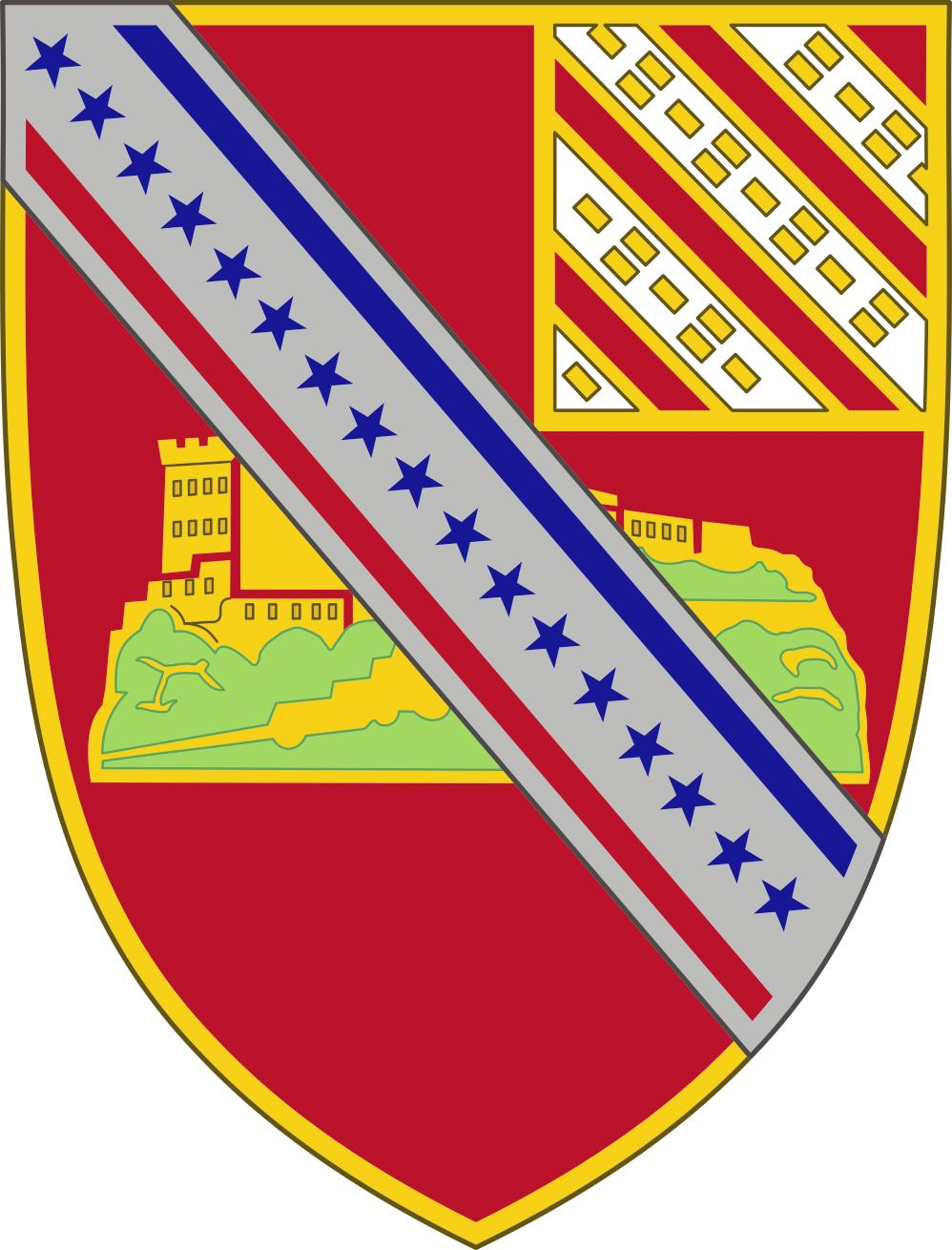

- Description/Blazon: A Gold color metal and enamel device 1 1/8 inches (2.9 cm) in height consisting of a shield blazoned: Gules, a conventionalized castle of Ehrenbreitstein with ramp Or on mount Proper, debruised by a bendlet Argent bearing two ribbons of the field and Azure with seventeen mullets of the last. A sinister canton bendy of eight ermine and of the field, (for the 8th Field Artillery).
- Symbolism: The field of the shield is red, the artillery color. The principal charge is the castle of Ehrenbreitstein debruised by a bendlet carrying the American colors and seventeen stars, to signify the occupation of that castle by the 17th Field Artillery. On a canton is a device from the arms of the parent organization.
- Background: The distinctive unit insignia was originally approved for the 17th Field Artillery Regiment on 8 May 1923. It was redesignated for the 17th Field Artillery Battalion on 2 August 1949. It was redesignated for the 17th Artillery Regiment on 28 November 1958. The insignia was redesignated effective 1 September 1971, for the 17th Field Artillery Regiment.

=== Coat of arms ===
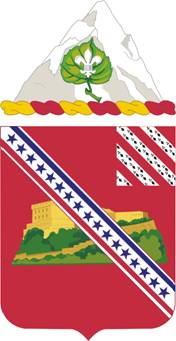

- Description/Blazon

Shield: Gules, a conventionalized castle of Ehrenbreitstein with ramp Or on mount Proper, debruised by a bendlet Argent bearing two ribbons of the field and Azure with seventeen mullets of the last. A sinister canton bendy of eight ermine and of the field, (for the 8th Field Artillery). Crest: On a wreath of the colors Or and Gules, a mount Argent garnished Vert, bearing a linden leaf Proper charged with a fleur-de-lis of the first. Motto: IN TIME OF PEACE PREPARE FOR WAR.

- Symbolism

Shield: The field of the shield is red, the artillery color. The principal charge is the castle of Ehrenbreitstein debruised by a bendlet carrying the American colors and seventeen stars, to signify the occupation of that castle by the 17th Field Artillery. On a canton is a device from the arms of the parent organization. Crest: The crest commemorates the two most noteworthy battle incidents. The white mountain is for Blanc Mont. The leaf is taken from Verte Feuille Farm, one of the positions occupied by the Regiment in the Soissons Offensive; the linden was chosen as being very common in the central empires. The fleur-de-lis is from the arms of Soissons.

- Background: The coat of arms was originally approved for the 17th Field Artillery Regiment on 25 March 1920. It was amended to correct the blazon of the shield on 15 June 1920. It was redesignated for the 17th Field Artillery Battalion on 27 September 1944. It was redesignated for the 17th Artillery Regiment on 28 November 1958. The insignia was redesignated effective 1 September 1971, for the 17th Field Artillery Regiment

== See also ==
- Field Artillery Branch (United States)
- U.S. Army Coast Artillery Corps
