= Camp Radcliff =

Former United States Army base in Vietnam

Camp Radcliff (An Khe Airfield) (An Khe Golf Course Airfield)
- An Khê, Gia Lai Province in Vietnam
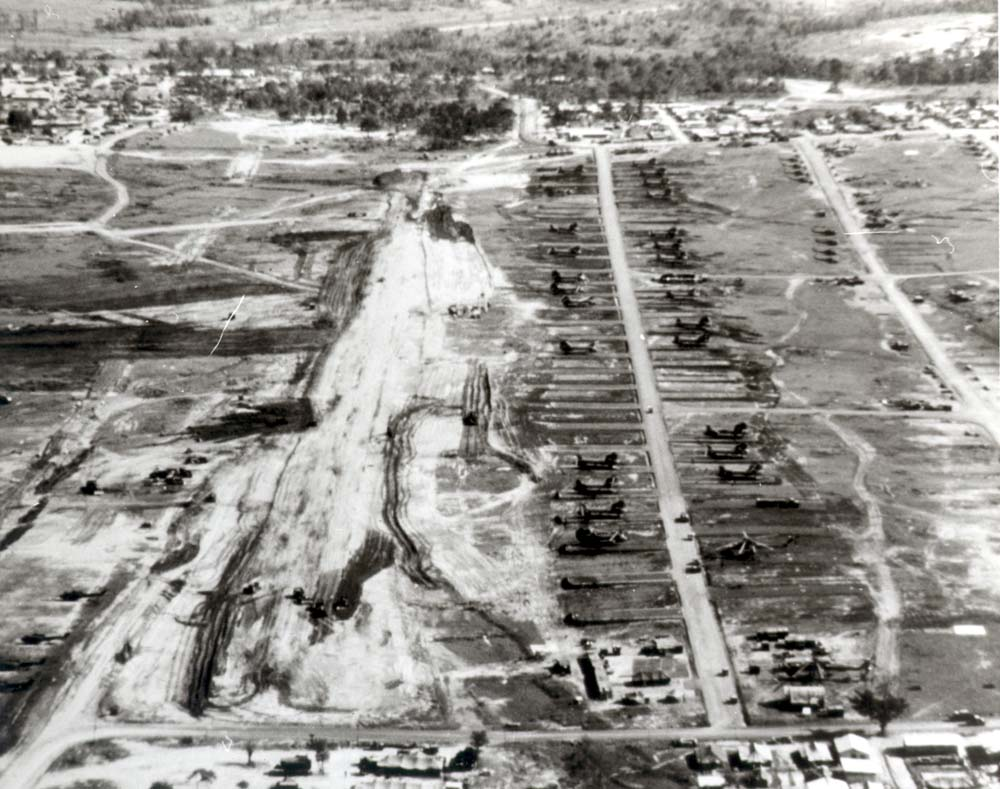
- Camp Radcliff airfield 1965

Site information
- Type: Army base
- Operator: Army of the Republic of Vietnam (ARVN); United States Army (U.S. Army)
- Condition: abandoned

Location
- Coordinates: 13.993°N 108.648498°E
- Area: Golf Course Heliport 275 Acres

Site history
- Built: 1965
- Built by: 70th Engineer Battalion
- In use: 27 August 1965-1971
- Battles/wars: Vietnam War

Garrison information
- Garrison: 1st Cavalry Division; 173rd Airborne Brigade; 4th Infantry Division

Airfield information
- Elevation: 1,380 feet (421 m) AMSL
Runways
Direction	Length and surface
03/21	4,300 feet (1,311 m) Concrete

Camp Radcliff (also known as An Khê Army Airfield, An Khê Base or the Golf Course) is a former United States Army base in the An Khê District in central Vietnam.

== History ==
=== 1965–67 ===
Camp Radcliff was established in late August 1965 by the 70th Engineer Battalion as the base camp for the 1st Cavalry Division. The camp was located on the main highway, QL-19, 60 kilometres (37 mi) northwest of Qui Nhơn on the coast and 60 kilometres (37 mi) southeast of Pleiku in the Central Highlands. The camp was named after 1/9 Cavalry Major Donald Radcliff, the 1st Cavalry's first combat death, who was killed on 18 August 1965 while supporting U.S. Marines in his helicopter gunship during Operation Starlite.

In order to reduce the amount of rotor-blown dust on the landing zone, the men of the 1st Cavalry Division's advance party were instructed to cut back foliage to ground level by hand giving the base its nickname of the Golf Course. The division also painted their distinctive insignia on nearby Hon Cong Mountain providing a landmark visible for many miles. Camp Radcliff was the largest helicopter base in the world at the time of its establishment, capable of accommodating the division's 400+ helicopters. The base also had an airfield to the south east called An Khe Airfield capable of landing Lockheed C-130A Hercules aircraft. The base had a perimeter of 26 km known as the Green Line with 3-man watchtowers every 50 m.

On the night of 3 September 1966 the Viet Cong (VC) carried out a mortar attack on the Golf Course. Starting at 21:50 the base was hit by 119 mortar rounds over a 5-minute period, killing four soldiers and wounding a further 76, while 77 helicopters were damaged.

Other units stationed at Camp Radcliff in this period included:

- Company B, 229th Assault Helicopter Battalion
- A detachment of 15th Medical Battalion with UH-1D Huey.
- 2nd Battalion, 17th Artillery (September 1965 – February 1970)
- 3rd Battalion, 18th Artillery (October 1965 – April 1967)
- 2nd Battalion, 19th Artillery (September 1965 – 1968)
- 1st Battalion, 21st Artillery (September 1965 – 1968)
- 2nd Surgical Hospital (August 1965 – April 1967)
- 15th Transportation Corps Battalion Aircraft Maintenance Support (September 1965 – 1968)
- 509th Signal Battalion (September 1966 – 1967)

On 12 March 1967 a USAF C-130 crashed on takeoff from the base airfield.

=== 1968–69 ===
In January 1968 the 1st Cavalry Division moved to Camp Evans and Camp Radcliff was taken over by the 173rd Airborne Brigade. The 173rd stayed at Camp Radcliff until mid-1969.

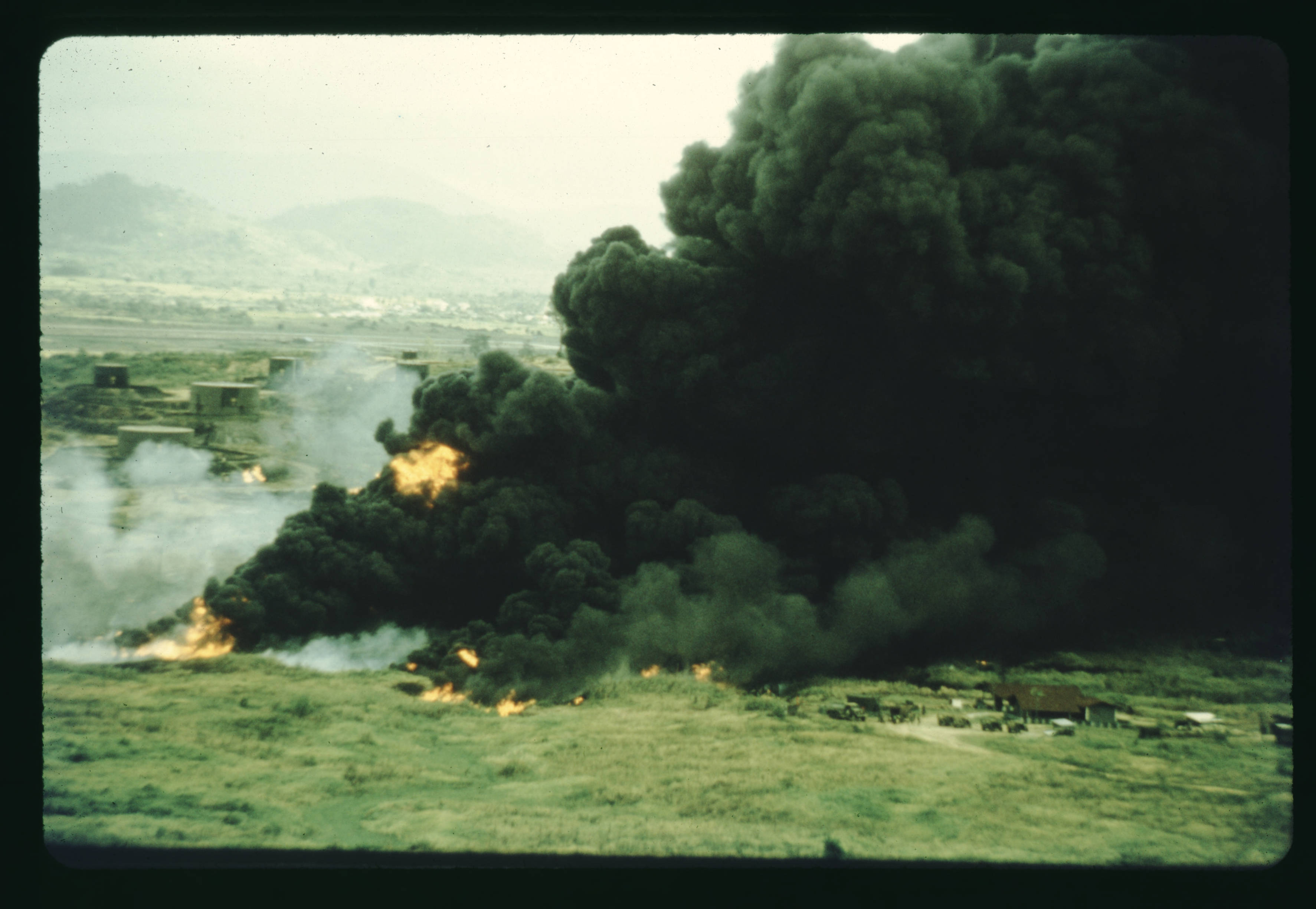
POL farm on fire following rocket attack, 11 November 1968

Other units stationed at Camp Radcliff in this period included:

- 5th Battalion, 22nd Artillery (November 1967 – 1969)
- 17th Field Hospital (1968 – July 1969)
- 5th Special Forces Group Detachment B-51 (September 1968 – October 1969)
- 1st Battalion, 50th Infantry Regiment (September 1967 – April 1969)
- 4th Battalion, 60th Artillery (June 1968-late 1970)
- 6th Battalion, 84th Artillery (March 1968 – August 1969)
- New Zealand Red Cross team (March 1968-January 1970)

At 02:00 on 30 October 1968 a mortar and sapper attack on the camp resulted in two South Vietnamese guards killed, four vehicles destroyed and damage to several buildings. At 15:28 on 11 November 1968 a mortar and recoilless rifle attack on the camp killed four South Vietnamese civilians and ignited 13,643 barrels of POL, one VC was killed.

A People's Amy of Vietnam (PAVN) sapper attack on the base on 16 November 1969 destroyed or damaged 20 helicopters and killed one helicopter mechanic

=== 1970–71 ===
The 4th Infantry Division was stationed at Camp Radcliff from mid 1969 – December 1970.

Other units stationed at Camp Radcliff in this period included:

- 7th Battalion, 15th Artillery (January to late 1970)
- 238th Aviation Company (March 1969 – December 1971)

== Current use ==
The base is now used by the PAVN.
