= An Khê =

Coordinates: 13°57′11″N 108°39′25″E

- District-level town (Class-4)
- An Khê Town; Thị xã An Khê
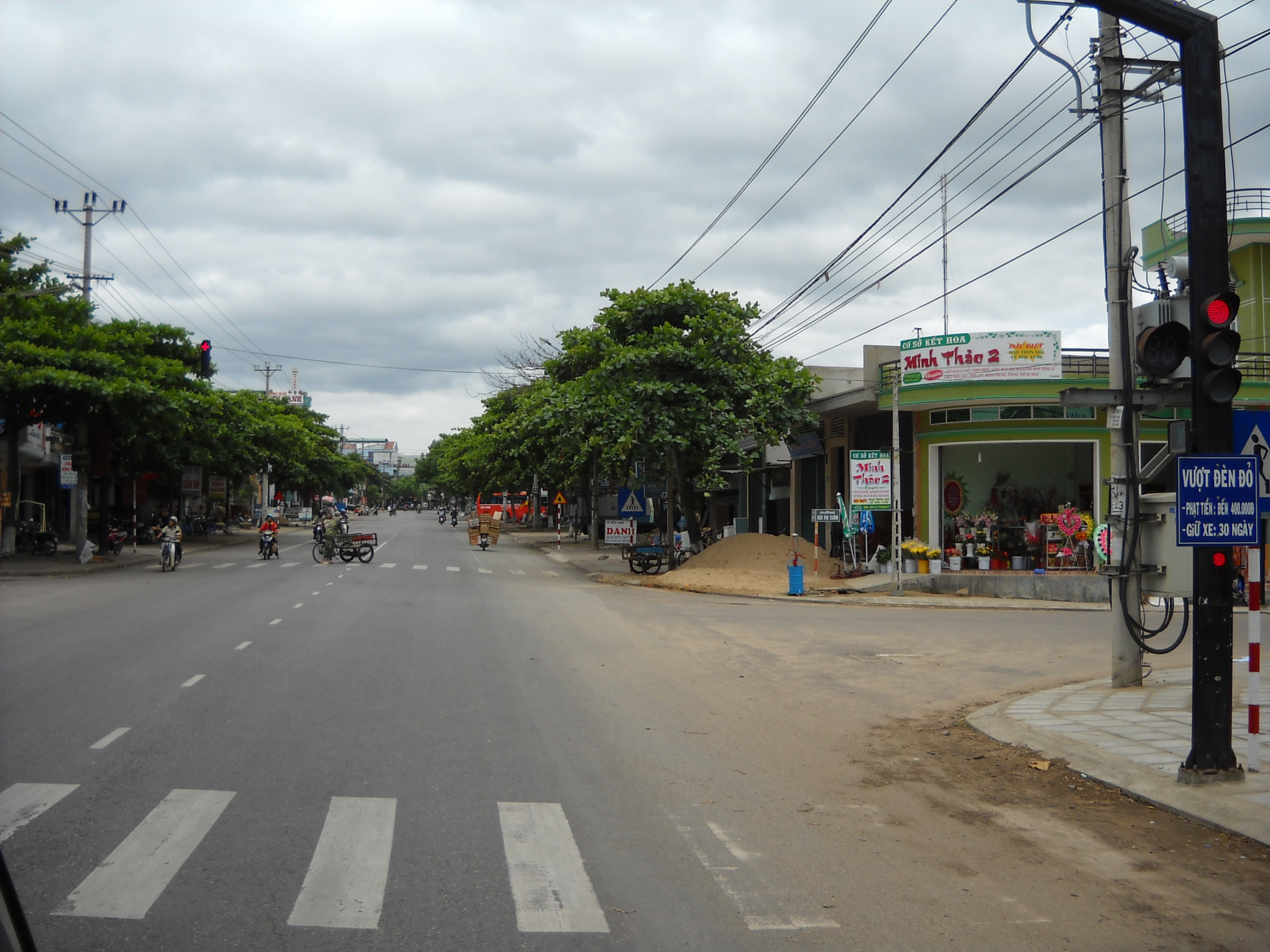
- The center of An Khê town
- Interactive map of An Khê
- Location within Vietnam Location within Southeast Asia Location within Asia
- Country: Vietnam
- Region: Central Highlands
- Province: Gia Lai province
- Capital: An Khê

Area
  - District-level town (Class-4): 78.58 sq mi (203.53 km^{2})
  - Urban: 19.24 sq mi (49.83 km^{2})

Population (31/12/2024)
  - District-level town (Class-4): 101.220
  - Density: 1.2881/sq mi (0.49732/km^{2})
- Time zone: UTC+7 (Indochina Time)

An Khê is a former district-level town (thị xã) of Gia Lai province in the Central Highlands region of Vietnam.

As of 2003 the district had a population of 63,118. The district covers an area of 199 km². The district capital lies at An Khê.

Located on the main highway, QL-19, between Quy Nhon on the coast and Pleiku in the Central Highlands, An Khê was of strategic significance during the Vietnam War.

== History ==
During the early 15th century, An Khe was a Cham/highlander city bore the name Samriddhipuri (City of Virtue, Richness).

=== First Indochina War ===
The Battle of Mang Yang Pass, the last major battle of the First Indochinese War, started near An Khê: on June 24, 1954, French colonial Groupe Mobile 100 received orders to abandon its defensive position at An Khê and to fall back to the safer Pleiku, some 50 miles away over Route Coloniale 19. At the road marker 'Kilometer 15' the column was ambushed by Việt Minh troops belonging to the 803rd Regiment and suffered heavy losses.

=== Second Indochina War ===
In August 1965 the U.S. 1st Cavalry Division established their main base, Camp Radcliff, near An Khê. In September of that year, the Battle of An Ninh took place about 30 km east of the town. Camp Radcliff remained in use by various U.S. Army units until late 1970 after which it was turned over to the ARVN.

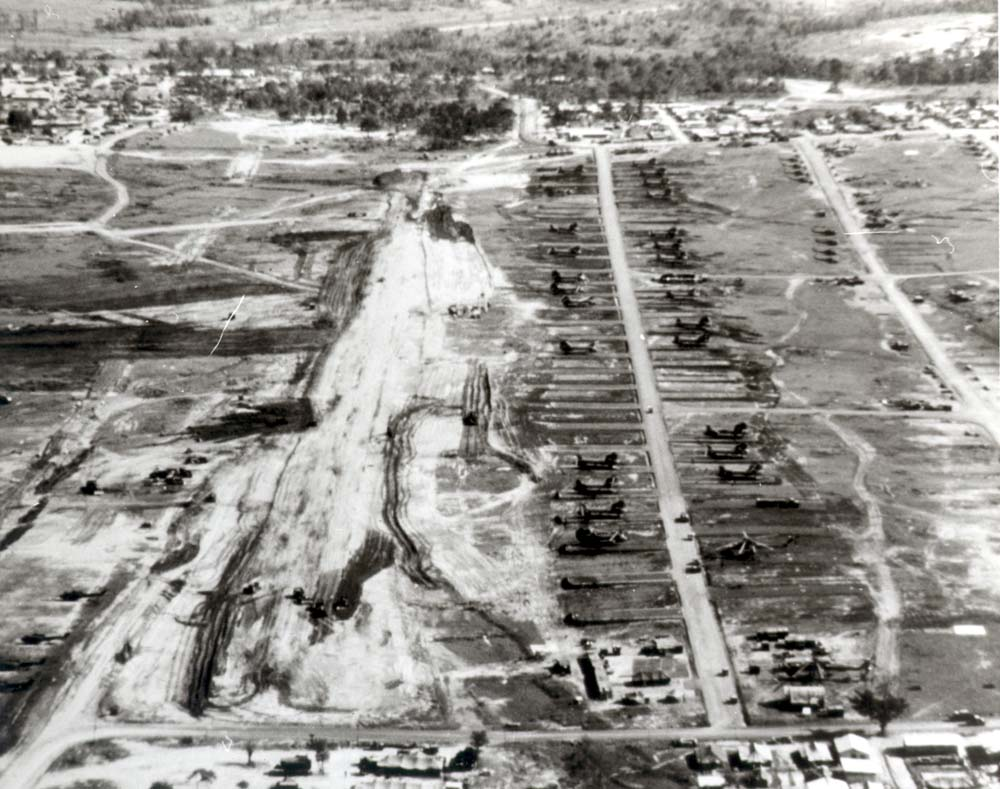
An Khê airfield, 1965

== Climate ==
Climate data for An Khê
Month	Jan	Feb	Mar	Apr	May	Jun	Jul	Aug	Sep	Oct	Nov	Dec	Year
Record high °C (°F)	34.0 (93.2)	35.5 (95.9)	37.2 (99.0)	38.9 (102.0)	37.8 (100.0)	37.6 (99.7)	36.5 (97.7)	35.4 (95.7)	35.2 (95.4)	34.4 (93.9)	32.0 (89.6)	35.1 (95.2)	38.9 (102.0)
Mean daily maximum °C (°F)	24.3 (75.7)	26.6 (79.9)	29.7 (85.5)	32.1 (89.8)	32.2 (90.0)	31.1 (88.0)	30.6 (87.1)	30.0 (86.0)	29.6 (85.3)	27.8 (82.0)	25.6 (78.1)	24.2 (75.6)	28.6 (83.5)
Daily mean °C (°F)	19.9 (67.8)	21.2 (70.2)	23.3 (73.9)	25.5 (77.9)	26.3 (79.3)	26.3 (79.3)	25.7 (78.3)	25.3 (77.5)	24.7 (76.5)	23.6 (74.5)	22.1 (71.8)	20.5 (68.9)	23.7 (74.7)
Mean daily minimum °C (°F)	17.1 (62.8)	17.8 (64.0)	19.3 (66.7)	21.4 (70.5)	22.6 (72.7)	23.0 (73.4)	22.6 (72.7)	22.4 (72.3)	21.9 (71.4)	21.0 (69.8)	19.8 (67.6)	18.2 (64.8)	20.6 (69.1)
Record low °C (°F)	9.0 (48.2)	11.9 (53.4)	11.9 (53.4)	15.6 (60.1)	18.9 (66.0)	19.0 (66.2)	19.5 (67.1)	19.0 (66.2)	17.8 (64.0)	13.2 (55.8)	13.0 (55.4)	9.8 (49.6)	9.0 (48.2)
Average precipitation mm (inches)	24.4 (0.96)	12.6 (0.50)	20.8 (0.82)	59.6 (2.35)	149.3 (5.88)	110.7 (4.36)	125.8 (4.95)	141.4 (5.57)	201.0 (7.91)	336.0 (13.23)	328.5 (12.93)	140.8 (5.54)	1,650.8 (64.99)
Average rainy days	8.8	3.7	4.2	6.9	13.0	12.2	13.6	15.9	18.0	18.7	17.8	14.4	147.2
Average relative humidity (%)	84.9	83.1	80.9	79.1	79.1	79.6	80.5	82.1	84.7	86.7	87.4	86.5	82.9
Mean monthly sunshine hours	175.9	201.8	239.9	251.0	245.6	218.1	213.9	197.4	173.3	165.7	142.0	135.3	2,360.1
Source: Vietnam Institute for Building Science and Technology
