= National Route 19 (Vietnam) =

Road in Vietnam

National Route 19
- Quốc lộ 19

Route information
- Length: 299 km (186 mi)
- Existed: 1958–present

Major junctions
- West end: Le Thanh Border Gate, Cambodian border
- northwest of Qui Nhơn; in Pleiku; southwest of Pleiku
- East end: east of Phu Cat Airport

Location
- Country: Vietnam

Highway system
- Transport in Vietnam
← QL 18C	→ QL 20

National Route 19 (Vietnamese: Quốc lộ 19 [QL19] or Đường 19) runs across Vietnam roughly in line with the 14th parallel north. The route includes two segments: National Route 19 begins at Qui Nhơn and ends just short of the Vietnam-Cambodia border, while National Route 19B begins on the Qui Nhơn peninsula and joins Route 1 east of Phu Cat Airport.

== Route description ==
National Route 19 runs through the following towns and cities:

- northwest of Qui Nhơn where it connects with Route 1
- An Khê District
- Pleiku, where it connects to Route 17
- southwest of Pleiku, where it connects to Route 14C

== History ==
Route Coloniale 19 or RC19 was constructed by the French in the early 20th century and was the main road connecting the Central Highlands with the coastal region of Vietnam.

The Battle of Mang Yang Pass took place along RC19 between An Khê and Pleiku from 24 to 30 June 1954.

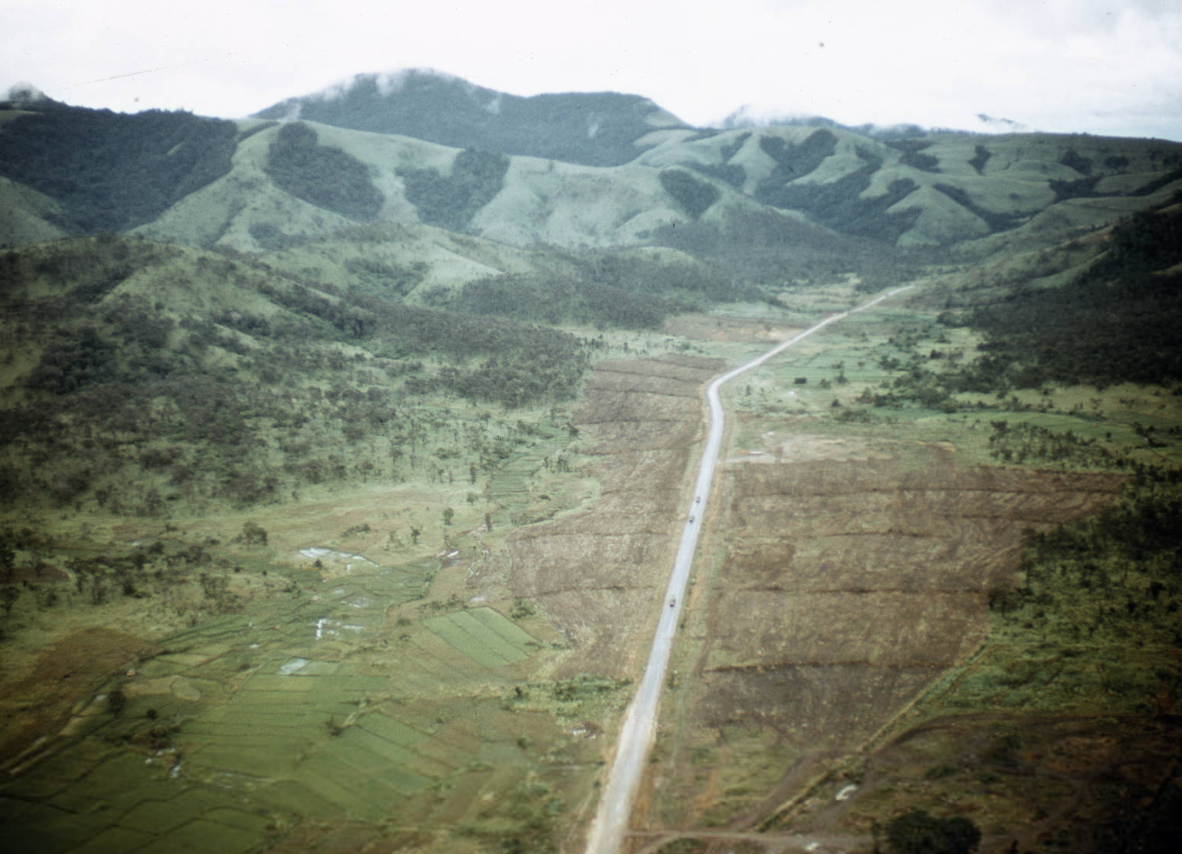
Land clearing along Route 19 between An Khe and Pleiku, 18 September 1967

In the early 1960s as the Vietnam War began to increase in intensity, the Army of the Republic of Vietnam (ARVN) and US Special Forces began to build a chain of bases in the Central Highlands to interdict the flow of men and material from North Vietnam.

In late January 1965 the Vietcong (VC) and North Vietnamese People's Army of Vietnam (PAVN) closed the road. The ARVN attempted to reopen it unsuccessfully in February and it wasn't reopened until mid-late March.

In August 1965 the 1st Cavalry Division established Camp Radcliff at An Khê. Route 19 became a vital supply artery to these bases and the PAVN/VC conducted frequent ambushes along the road.

As part of the Battle of Ban Me Thuot in March 1975, the PAVN blocked Route 19 preventing the movement of ARVN reinforcements towards Pleiku and preventing its use in the subsequent evacuation of the Central Highlands.
