= Chu Pong Massif =

Mountain in Central Highlands, Vietnam

The Chu Pong Massif (also known as the Chu Prong), in the Central Highlands of Vietnam, is a mountain with complex topography, valleys, and forests that stretches into Cambodia. The Chu Pong is situated north of the Gia Lai river, south of the Ia Krel river, and lies within Vietnam's Chư Prông District.

The Chu Pong Massif was the site of the 1965 Battle of Ia Drang during the Vietnam War. In March 1966 US Armed Forces conducted Operation Hot Tip, one of a series of deforestation efforts through firebombing, targeting the Chu Pong Massif because it had been used as a base by Viet Cong and North Vietnamese forces. The operation initially bombed the forests of the Massif with napalm and the desiccant Agent Blue in mid February. Then in mid March US forces bombed the mountain again with eleven napalm strikes and M-35 bomblets delivered from B-52 bombers. The operation successfully destroyed much of the vegetation of the Chu Pong Massif but was not able to produce self-sustaining fire in its forests.
