= Pleiku campaign =

1965 Vietnam War campaign

Coordinates: 13°35′N 107°43′E

- Part of the Vietnam War
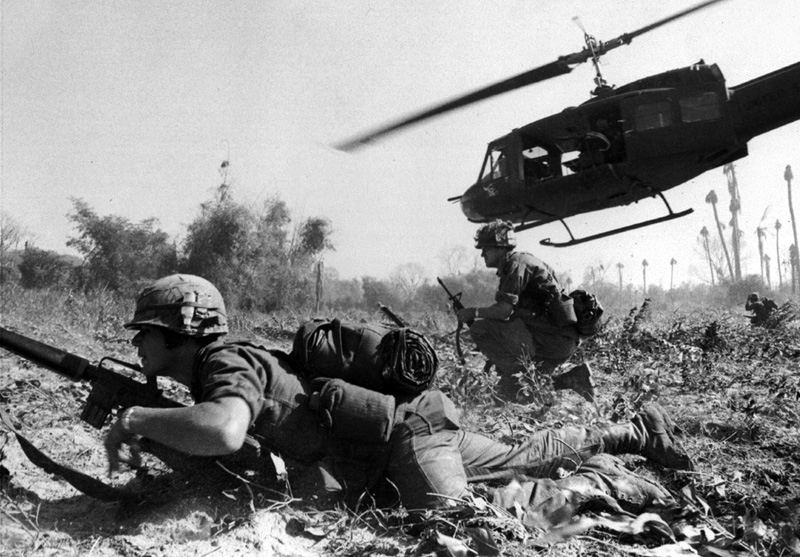
- Bruce P. Crandall's UH-1 Huey helicopter and U.S. Army Air Cavalrymen under fire at LZ X-Ray
Date	27 October – 26 November 1965
Location	Chu Pong-Ia Drang complex, Central Highlands, South Vietnam
Result	Pleime camp relieved; NVA bases in Chu Pong-Ia Drang dismantled/NVA survivors fled into Cambodia

Belligerents
South Vietnam; United States	North Vietnam; Viet Cong

Commanders and leaders
Vĩnh Lộc (ARVN III Corps); Robert McNamara (US Secretary of Defense); Stanley R. Larsen (IFFV HQ); Harry Kinnard (1ACD HQ); Richard T. Knowles (1ACD FCP); Harlow Clark (1st AC Brigade); Ray Lynch (2nd AC Brigade); Thomas W. Brown (3rd AC Brigade); Harold G. Moore (1/7); Robert McDade (2/7); Walter B. Tully (2/5)	Chu Huy Mân (B3 Field Front); Nguyễn Hữu An (Fwd CP); Tô Định Khẩn (32nd Rgt); Vũ Sắc (33rd Rgt); Lê Tiến Hòa (66th Rgt); Phạm Công Cửu (66th Deputy Cmdr) †; Lã Ngọc Châu (66th Political Commissar); Lê Xuân Phôi (8/66) †; Nguyễn Văn Định (9/66)

Units involved
II Corps Force; 1st Air Cavalry Division; 3AC B-52 bombers (Guam).	B3 Field Front Force (three regiments, ~5,500 men)

Casualties and losses
~600 (excluding Battle of Ia Drang)	U.S claimed: ~6,000

The Pleiku campaign took place from 23 October to 26 November 1965. II Corps Command named it Pleime campaign, with a slightly different starting date of 20 October instead of 23 October, consisted of three operations:

- Operation Dân Thắng 21(20 to 26 October 1965), the first Pleime preparatory phase, was the relief operation of the besieged Pleime camp.
- Operation Long Reach, which was the Chu Pong phase, comprising two operations: Operation All the Way (27 October – 9 November 1965) conducted by the 1st Air Cavalry Brigade and Operation Silver Bayonet I (9–18 November 1965) conducted by the 3rd Air Cavalry Brigade against the NVA, which culminated in the Battle of Ia Drang occurring from 14 to 18 November 1965.
- Operation Than Phong 7 (18–26 November 1965) conducted by the ARVN Airborne Brigade in conjunction with the 2nd Air Cavalry Brigade conducting Operation Silver Bayonet II in the Ia Drang area. It was the final Ia Drang exploitation phase.

This joint ARVN-US campaign was characterized by a special procedure of "common operational concept, common intelligence, common reserve, and separate command".

== Background ==
=== NVA B3 Field Front Command ===
In July 1965, General Chu Huy Man was assigned commander of B3 Field Front in preparation for the Winter–Spring 1965 campaign to conquer the Central Highlands.

The B3 Field Front Command employed three regiments in the effort to conquer the Central Highlands: the 32nd to set up the ambush to destroy the ARVN relief column; the 33rd to put a siege of the Pleime camps; and the 66th to join force with the 32nd and 33rd to overrun Pleiku city.

=== Chinese Communist aid ===
The North Vietnamese Communist Government got help from the Chinese Communist Government in terms of military, financial aid, and Chinese advisors.

A Chinese Advisors Group established its headquarters in Phnom Penh to coordinate the logistics aspect of the NVA Pleime attack.

=== Intelligence ===
In the exercise of the campaign, II Corps Command had a unique source of intelligence. This intelligence source consisted of radio intercepts of the communications between the Chinese Advisors that II Corps Command alluded to as "Special Agents". LTC Hal Moore got a sample of this type of intelligence in the Mandarin dialect on the eve of the LZ X-Ray air assault,

It allowed the planning for every aspect of the operations on "current(real-time) intelligence". It also permitted the accurate scheduling of the B-52 strikes.

This source of intelligence was generated at J2/MACV level (Brigadier General McChristian) and disseminated to G2/ACDF (Brigadier General Knowles) through the channel of G2/IFFV (Major General Larsen).

=== Ground/Air Counter-Attack ===
In September 1965, prior to attack of the Pleime camp, a B-52 strike – to destroy the NVA B3 Field Front Forces comprising the three 32nd, 33rd and 66th Regiments as they assembled in the bases set up in the Chu Pong areas to stage the attack of the Pleime camp scheduled for December 1962, – was in the planning on the desk of J2/MACV.

When the B3 Field Command decided for an earlier attack on 19 October with only the 32nd and the 33rd, the plan was modified with the introduction of Operation Dân Thắng 21 (Pleime) and Operation Long Reach (Chupong) with the purpose to allowing the three 32nd, 33rd and 66th to regroup as available targets for B-52 bombers. The plan was code-named "Plei Me/Chupong Campaign" and narrated in Brigadier General McChristian's report, "Intelligence Aspect of Plei Me/Chu Pong Campaign".

A target becomes available for B-52 strike when it can be pinpointed in a one square kilometer spot. On November 11, intelligence source notified Brigadier Knowles all three NVA regiments had assembled within one square kilometer area with the 66th being the last one reaching that condition (center of mass Vic YA 9104), and the 32nd (YA 820070) and the 33rd (YA 940010) less than one square kilometer. It was on that day that Brigadier General Knowles presented the original B-52 strike plan of J2/MACV through Major General Larsen to Brigadier General DePuy in order for the chief J3/MACV to execute the B-52 strike.

A particularity of the B-52 strike operation at Chu Pong, is that 3AC/SAC was able to reduce the reaction strike time down to 14 hours and 17 minutes from the normal required 24 hours DePuy "stated that this is the fastest a strike of this nature ".

After three consecutive days of B-52 strikes, II Corps Command estimated the B3 Field Front Forces had lost 2/3 of its strength and after 5 consecutive days, its rear bases with trenches and bunkers were destroyed and the back door into was Cambodia closed. The ARVN Airborne Brigade was brought in to "finish' em'".

=== Air Cavalry Division ===
Upon its arrival in Viet Nam in September 1965, the 1st Air Cavalry Division was put under the command of I Field Force Viet Nam (IFFV) and to operate in the II Corps areas of responsibility. The 1st Air Cavalry immediately established its headquarters named Camp Halloway in pleiku Central Highlands, while its newly arrived troops started to conduct operations in the Bong Son coastal area of Qui Nhon.

The Air Cavalry participated in the campaign in two steps: Operation Ingram (from 23 to 26 October) then Operation Long Reach (from 27 October to 26 November).

Operation Long Reach derives from trường chinh (in Vietnamese). It was assigned – on 26 October – by the II Corps Command to the 1st Air Cavalry Division with the mission to pursue the enemy into the Ia Drang-Chu Pong complex. The ARVN Airborne Brigade was put on the standby as reserved force during the Chu Pong phase, until it became the main force during the Ia Drang phase.

=== USAF's role ===
The U.S. Air Force had a decisive role in repulsing the attacking troops at the camp and the ambush sites, with 696 day and night strike sorties and with 74 strike sorties, respectively.

== Pleime, the first preparatory phase (20–26 October) ==
On 19 October, the NVA 33rd Regiment launched the attack of the Pleime camp. The attack was a luring tactic aiming to attract the II Corps main force out of Pleiku to destroy it with an ambush. II Corps Command took up the challenge. At the beginning of the siege, IFFV Commander in Nhatrang inquired who in the II Corps Headquarters was in charge of the counter-attack in the absence of the Commanding General and got the answer that it was the II Corps Chief of Staff.

On 20 October, he immediately reacted by establishing a relief Armored Task Force to rescue the camp and at the same time dispatched a two ARVN-US Special Forces company team to reinforce the camp.

On 22 October the ARVN-US Special Forces team entered the camp after being helilifted to a location North East Pleime. Meanwhile, to counter the NVA mobile ambush tactic, the Relief Armored Task Force was ordered to linger around Phu My as to give the appearance of conducting a patrol operation while waiting for more reinforcement.

On 23 October, II Corps Command made a request for reinforcement from IFFV (General Stanley R.Larsen) to replace the 22nd Ranger Battalion that was needed to reinforce the relief column in the task of securing the Pleiku Airfield and Pleiku city. At 1300 hours the US reinforcement (Ingram Task Force comprising 1/12 Air Cavalry Infantry Battalion and the one battery 2/19 Arty) arrived in Pleiku.

On 24 October, the Relief Armored Task Force received order to push toward the camp, and the 2/19 Air Cavalry Arty battery moved from Pleiku Airfield to position at 10 km South of Phu My to provide artillery support to the relief column. After failing to achieve the ambush, the 32nd Regiment received the order to retreat with 120 killed and 75 crew-served and individual weapons captured.

On 25 October, the Relief Armored Task Force pushed through the ambush site and entered the camp at dusk.

On 26 October, Operation Dân Thắng 21 ended with the retreat of the 33rd Regiment and with about 400 casualties on the NVA side.

=== Repulsing Force ===
II Corps Command relied on the USAF's firepower of B-57s, AIEs, F-100s, F-8s and AC-47s in repulsing the enemy attacking troops both at the Pleime camp and at the ambush sites.

== Chu Pong, the main phase (27 October-17 November) ==
On 26 October, while the relief of the Pleime camp was wrapping up, II Corps Command requested I Field Force Vietnam (IFFV) Command have the 1st Air Cavalry Division pursue the withdrawing troops of the 32nd and 33rd Regiments. It was approved and the operation was named Operation Long Reach (Trường Chinh in Vietnamese). To entice the B3 Field Front to wanting to attack the Pleime camp again with its three 32nd, 33rd and 66th Regiments together this time, while expanding the Tactical Operational Area of Responsibility of the Air Cavalry, the Pleime Camp was maintained under the responsibility of II Corps. To enhance the ability to work closely with the ARVN in the execution of Operation Long Reach, Brigadier General Knowles set up his tactical Command Post, co-located with II Corps Headquarters in Pleiku.

=== Operation All the Way ===
On 27 October, the 1st Air Cavalry Brigade commenced Operation All the Way as the first part of Operation Long Reach while the lead elements of the 33rd had closed on it assembly area at the village Kro.

On 28 October, the 32nd Regiment had nearly reached its base on the north bank of Ia Drang.

On 29 October, the 33rd Regiment closed on it base at Anta Village.

On 1 November, units of the 1st Air Cavalry Brigade had the first engagement with battalion size enemy force at the 33rd Regiment aid station.

On 2 November, the 32nd Regiment Command Post had arrived at Hill 762, but the remaining of the regiment troops still stretched back to near Pleime, and the 66th Regiment was moving into assembly areas in the Chu Pong-Ia Drang area.

On 3 November, units of the 1st Air Cavalry Brigade ambushed the 8/66 Battalion.

On 4 November, the 33rd Regiment moved out of its base at Hill 732 onto the eastern slopes of Chu Pong with its battalions taking up positions from Hill 732 down through Anta Village to the north bank of the Ia Meur.

==== A Walk in the Park ====
The purpose of Operation All the Way was not to search out and destroy the enemy troops of the 33rd Regiment in retreat, but rather to herd them back in rejoining its two sister regiments in the Chu Pong rear bases. Armed helicopters gunships interdicted scattered enemy troops to linger on the withdrawal paths between the Pleime camp and the Chu Pong rear bases, while the regimental headquarters on the move was spare of harassment. Intentional few engagements with the enemy troops were sought out, resulting in Operation All the Way conducted by the 1st Air Cavalry Brigade to be characterized as "a walk in the Park".

On 6 November the 6/33 Battalion was almost annihilated after an engagement with the 2/8 Air Cavalry Battalion.

On 9 November, the 33rd Regiment gathered the last of its units.

=== Operation Silver Bayonet I ===
On 10 November, the 3rd Air Cavalry Brigade replaced the 1st Air Cavalry Brigade and the operations were shifted from west to east in a diversionary maneuver to entice the B3 Field Front to regroup its three regiments in assembly area to regain its early advantage with a second attack of the Pleime camp. It set the D-day for 16 November.

On 11 November, the 66th Regiment was along the north bank of the Ia Drang (center of mass Vic YA 9104); the 32nd Regiment was also up north (YA 820070); and the 33rd Regiment was in the vicinity of the Anta Village (YA 940010). All three regiments became available targets for B-52 strike. Brigadier General Knowles notified Brigadier General DePuy to initiate the execution of the B-52 strike.

On 12 November, B3 Field Front units continued preparations and rehearsals for the scheduled attack on Pleime. Major General Larsen, IFFV Commander issued order to General Knowles to revert the operations to the west in preparation to perform a diversionary maneuver to keep the three B3 Field Front regiments at their assembly areas.

On 13 November, some recon parties and transportation units had moved out heading toward Pleime. Colonel Brown, 3rd Air Cavalry Brigade Commander, issued order to Lieutenant Colonel Hal Moore, 1/7 Air Cavalry Battalion to prepare for an air assault into LZ X-Ray the next day.

==== LZ X-Ray Battle ====
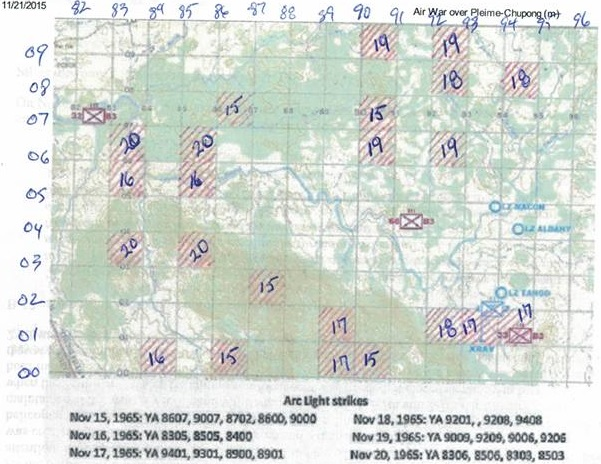
B-52 strike on NVA troop positions, November 15–20

On November 14, an ARVN intelligence source by intercept of radio communication indicated that before dawn, some assault elements of the NVA B3 Field Front started moving out of their assembly areas to attack the Pleime camp.

At 10:48, the 1/7 Air Cavalry was inserted at LZ X-Ray, followed by the 2/7 Air Cavalry Battalion. The B3 Field Front reacted by postponing the scheduled movement to attack the Pleime camp and threw in the battlefield to engage the Air Cavalry troops with the 7/66 and 9/66 Battalions. In the afternoon, Colonel Brown moved the 2/5 Air Cavalry Battalion to LZ Victor in preparation for the withdrawal of the 1/7 Air Cavalry Battalion.

On the same day, at 12:00, Brigadier General DePuy, J3/MACV, notified 3A/SAC to launch the B-52 strike.

On 15 November, at 09:30, Colonel Brown landed at LZ X-Ray to make preparation to withdraw the 1/7 Air Cavalry Battalion, deeming its job of drawing the attention of the enemy away from attacking the Pleime camp done. By 1200 hours, the 2/5 Air Cavalry Battalion closed in the LZ X-Ray after a five-hour march from LZ Victor in preparation to allow the 1/7 Air Cavalry Battalion to withdraw the next day.

On the same day, at precisely 16:00, B-52's first wave of carpet bombings fell about 7 kilometers west of LZ X-Ray while the 32nd Regiment held its positions at 12–14 kilometers. At 16:30, Brigadier General Knowles, 1st Air Cavalry Division Forward, landed at the LZ X-Ray to announce the withdrawal of the 1/7th Air Cavalry Battalion set for the next day.

On 16 November, the 1/7 Air Cavalry Battalion was helilifted out of the LZ X-Ray, covered by the 2/7 and the 2/5 Air Cavalry Battalions. Meanwhile, B-52 bombers performed more sorties and struck various enemy troop positions all over the Chu Pong-Ia Drang complex.

===== Diversionary Maneuver =====
As soon as the insertion of the 1/7 Air Cavalry Battalion caught the attention of the B3 Field Front Command causing it to postpone the movement to attack the Pleime camp, on the late afternoon of 14 November, Colonel Brown started making preparations to withdraw the battalion.

==== LZ Albany ====
On 17 November, the 2/7 and 2/5 Air Cavalry Battalions were ordered to march out the landing zone heading north bound toward LZ Albany and north-northeast bound toward LZ Columbus to make way for the B-52 bombers to strike the enemy troops remaining in LZ X-Ray areas and various other locations of the Chu Pong-Ia Drang complex. Upon approaching the LZ Albany vicinity, the 2/7 Air Cavalry walked into a "meeting engagement" with units of the 1/33 and 8/66 Battalions, which neither side had anticipated. The Air Cavalry troops sustained heavy casualties with 151 killed in action and 121 wounded in action. The enemy's casualties were much heavier with 403 body count killed, a further estimated 100 killed and 112 weapons captured. During the day, B-52 bombers continued carpet bombing the Chu Pong-Ia Drang complex.

== Ia Drang, the final exploitation phase (18–26 November) ==
On 17 November, after two days of B-52 strike, II Corps Command based on estimated the enemy force had lost 2/3 of its strength, decided to "finish off" the campaign with Operation Thần Phong 7 conducted by the ARVN Airborne Brigade. A new firepower base was established at LZ Crooks to give artillery support to the Airborne Brigade. It was secured by the 2/5 Air Cavalry Battalion conducting Operation Silver Bayonet II.

On 18 November, the Airborne Brigade set up its forward command post at the Duc Co camp alongside the five Airborne Battalions. From 1500H to 1600H, the 52nd Aviation comprising ten UH1Ds, twelve UH1Bs and eleven UH1Bs (A), reinforced by twenty UH1Ds and six UH1Bs (A) from the 229th Avn Bn, 1st Air Cav Div helilifted 1,500 troops of the 3rd, 5th and 6th Airborne Battalions from Duc Co to landing zone YA 841092. During the day, B-52 bombers continued carpet bombing the Chu Pong-Ia Drang complex.

On 19 November, in the morning, the 3rd and 6th Airborne swept the areas marching in two parallel prongs toward Plei The. B-52 bombers continued carpet bombing the Chu Pong-Ia Drang complex.

On 20 November, by noon the 3rd Battalion veered down toward the position of the 6th Battalion at YA 805080. At 1440H, the NVA 634th Battalion marched into the ambush site. Nearly 200 VC were killed in this ambush. Around 16:00H, the 3rd, 5th and 6th Battalions were ordered to march toward an assembly area located at YA822075. At 1745H, the 8th Airborne Battalion was helilifted to this spot to secure it. During the day, B-52 bombers continued carpet bombing the Chu Pong-Ia Drang complex.

On 22 November, at 11:00H, the 2nd Battalion and the 7th Battalion were helilifted to the assembly area where the 3rd, 5th and 6th Battalions closed in at 13:50H.

On 23 November, the Airborne Brigade planned an ambush for the following morning. 75 VC were killed and 58 weapons were captured in this ambush.

On 26 November, witnessing no further contact, the ARVN Airborne Brigade withdrew from the area.

== Results ==
ARVN II Corps recapitulated the NVA losses as following:

– Phase I: 220 KIA(BC), 228 KIA(est), 115 WIA, 6 CIA, 24 weapons (crew served), 81 weapons(individual).

– Phase II: 1515 KIA(BC), 2042 KIA(est), 1178 WIA, 163 CIA, 126 weapons (crew served), 897 weapons(individual).

– Phase III: 265 KIA(BC), n/a KIA(est), n/a WIA, 10 CIA, 19 weapons (crew served), 49 weapons(individual).

– Total: 4,254 KIA(BC), 2,270 KIA(est), 1293 WIA, 179 CIA, 169 weapons (crew served), 1,027 weapons(individual).

NVA casualty figures advanced by II Corps Command were relied especially on NVA regimental command posts' own loss reports, intercepted by ARVN radio listening stations. Furthermore, they include NVA troop casualties caused by the 5 day Arc Light airstrike that the NVA and US sides fail to take into account.

Note: Each of the three NVA regiments had a total of 2,200 soldiers comprising: 1st Bn 500, 2nd Bn 500, 3rd Bn 500, Mortar Co 150, Anti-Aircraft Co 150, Signal Co 120, Transportation Co 150, Medical Co 40, Engineer Co 60, Recon Co 50.

The campaign achieved its mission of destroying the B3 Field Front's stronghold located in the Chu Pong-Ia Drang complex and wiping out its entire three regimental forces. However, the sanctuaries established in the Cambodian territory provided a safe haven to the B3 Field Front Forces. The three torn off NVA regiments were replaced by new contingents infiltrated from the North and the B3 Field Front was renamed as the NVA Lê Lợi Division Headquarters. It resumed its activities across the border in April 1966.
