= Ia Drang River =

River in Vietnam and Cambodia

Coordinates: 13°18′58″N 107°20′18″E

Ia Drang River (Vietnamese: Sông Ia Drăng), also known as the Prêk Drang in Cambodia, is a tributary of the Srepok River in the Mekong river system that flows through Vietnam and Cambodia.

The river originates from the hills in southern Pleiku, the provincial capital of Gia Lai province in the Central Highlands region of Vietnam. It then flows southwestwards, through Chư Prông district and enters the Ou Ya Dav District of Ratanakiri province in northeast Cambodia, before joining the Srepok River.

The valley northeast of the Chư Prông massif, through which the river flows, is the site of the Battle of Ia Drang in November 1965, during the Vietnam War.

== See also ==
- Battle of Ia Drang
