= Battle of Ia Drang =

1965 battle of the Vietnam War

Battle of Ia Drang Valley
- Part of the Vietnam War (Operation Silver Bayonet I, Pleiku campaign 1965)
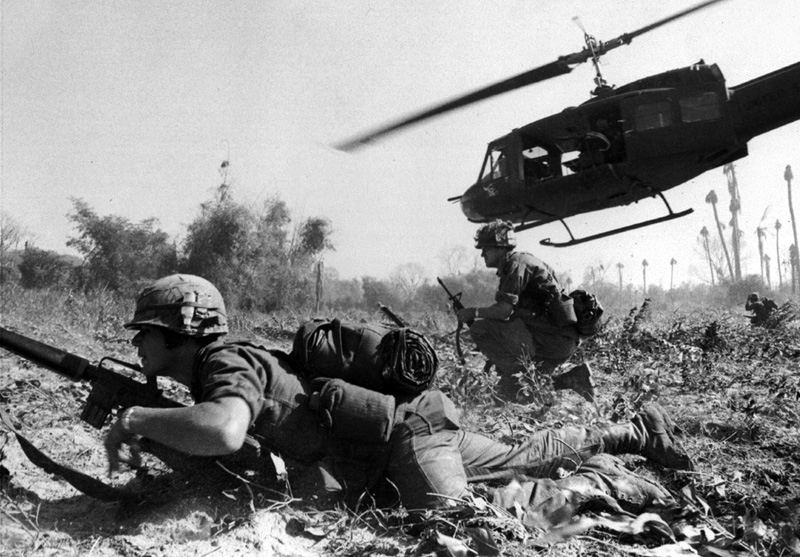
- U.S. Army soldiers air-lifted into LZ X-Ray.
| Date | November 14–18, 1965 (5 days) |
| Location | 13°35′N 107°43′E Chu Pong-Ia Drang complex, Central Highlands, South Vietnam |
| Result | See Effect and aftermath section |

Belligerents
| United States; Supported by: South Vietnam | North Vietnam |

Commanders and leaders
| Richard T. Knowles 1st Air Cavalry Division Fwd CP; Thomas W. Brown 3rd Air Cavalry Brigade; Harold G. Moore, 1st Battalion, 7th Cavalry; Robert McDade, 2nd Battalion, 7th Cavalry; Robert B. Tully, 2nd Battalion, 5th Cavalry | Nguyễn Hữu An B3 Front Fwd CP commander Đặng Vũ Hiệp B3 Front Fwd CP commissar Phạm Công Cửu 66th Deputy CO; Lã Ngọc Châu 66th PO; Lê Xuân Phôi 8/66 †; Nguyễn Văn Định 9/66 |

Units involved
| (United States) 1st Cavalry Division (Airmobile): 3rd Brigade: 1st Bn, 7th Cavalry; 2nd Bn, 7th Cavalry; 2nd Brigade: 2nd Bn, 5th Cavalry; 1st Battalion, 21st Artillery: Two batteries of artillery (included 24 M2 howitzers); 3AC Fleet/SAC | (Vietnam) 33rd Regiment: 1st Battalion; 3rd Battalion; (Vietnam) 66th Regiment: 7th Battalion; 8th Battalion; 9th Battalion |

Strength
| Total: ~1,000 U.S. cavalry troops and ~900 ARVN troops Two battalions of artillery Elements of multiple aircraft and helicopter support units flew 740 CAS sorties, along with 5 B-52 missions with 96 sorties | Total: ~2,500 troops Separate 12.7 mm anti-aircraft gun and mortar units |

Casualties and losses
| United States: 237 killed, 258 wounded, and 4 missing (~50% of troop strength); South Vietnam 132 killed, 248 wounded, and 18 missing | U.S. claimed: 1,037–1,745 killed PAVN report: 554 killed and 669 wounded (~49% of troop strength) |
- See Casualties section

The Battle of Ia Drang (Vietnamese: Trận Ia Đrăng, [iə̯ ɗrăŋ]; in English /ˈiːə dræŋ/) was the first major battle between the United States Army and the People's Army of Vietnam (PAVN), as part of the Pleiku campaign conducted early in the Vietnam War, at the eastern foot of the Chu Pong Massif in the central highlands of Vietnam, in 1965. It is notable for being the first large scale helicopter air assault and also the first use of Boeing B-52 Stratofortress strategic bombers in a tactical support role. Ia Drang set the blueprint for the Vietnam War with the Americans relying on air mobility, artillery fire and close air support, while the PAVN neutralized that firepower by quickly engaging American forces at very close range.

Ia Drang comprised two main engagements, centered on two helicopter landing zones (LZs), the first known as LZ X-Ray, followed by LZ Albany, farther north in the Ia Drang Valley.

LZ X-Ray involved the 1st Battalion, 7th Cavalry Regiment and supporting units under the command of Lieutenant Colonel Hal Moore, and took place November 14–16, at LZ X-Ray. Surrounded and under heavy fire from a numerically superior force, the American forces were able to hold back the North Vietnamese forces over three days, largely through the support of air power and heavy artillery bombardment, which the North Vietnamese lacked. The Americans claimed LZ X-Ray as a tactical victory, citing a 10:1 kill ratio.

The second engagement involved the 2nd Battalion, 7th Cavalry Regiment plus supporting units under the command of Lieutenant Colonel Robert McDade, and took place on November 17 at LZ Albany. When an American battalion was ambushed in close quarters, they were unable to use air and artillery support due to the close engagement of the North Vietnamese and the Americans suffered a casualty rate of over 50% before being extricated. Both sides claimed victory.

The battle at LZ X-Ray was documented in the CBS special report Battle of Ia Drang Valley by Morley Safer and the critically acclaimed book We Were Soldiers Once... And Young by Hal Moore and Joseph L. Galloway. In 1994, Moore, Galloway and men who fought on both the American and North Vietnamese sides, traveled back to the remote jungle clearings where the battle took place. At the time the U.S. did not have diplomatic relations with Vietnam. The risky trip which took a year to arrange was part of an award-winning ABC News documentary, They Were Young and Brave produced by Terence Wrong. Randall Wallace depicted the battle at LZ X-Ray in the 2002 movie We Were Soldiers starring Mel Gibson and Barry Pepper as Moore and Galloway, respectively.

Galloway later described Ia Drang as "the battle that convinced Ho Chi Minh he could win".

== Background ==
By early 1965, the majority of rural South Vietnam was under limited Viet Cong (VC) control, increasingly supported by People's Army of Vietnam (PAVN) regulars from North Vietnam. Military Assistance Command, Vietnam (MACV) General William C. Westmoreland had secured the commitment of upward of 300,000 U.S. regulars from President Lyndon B. Johnson and a build-up of forces took place in the summer of 1965.

VC forces were in nominal control of most of the South Vietnamese countryside by 1965 and had established military infrastructure in the Central Highlands, to the northeast of the Saigon region. Vietnamese communist forces had operated in this area during the previous decade in the First Indochina War against the French, winning a notable victory at the Battle of Mang Yang Pass in 1954. There were few reliable roads into the area, making it an ideal place for the VC forces to form bases, relatively immune from attack by the generally road-bound Army of the Republic of Vietnam (ARVN) forces. During 1965, large groups of PAVN regulars moved into the area to conduct offensive operations. Attacks to the southwest from these bases threatened to cut South Vietnam in two.

By 1964 North Vietnam had established the B3 Front in the central highlands of South Vietnam. By early November 1965, three PAVN regiments – the 32nd, 33rd and 66th – and the H15 Local Force Battalion had been assembled in the area. The B3 Front commander, Maj. Gen. Chu Huy Mân, planned to target South Vietnamese positions in Kon Tum and Pleiku provinces. The city of Pleiku was the location of the South Vietnamese II Corps headquarters, commanded by Maj. Gen. Vĩnh Lộc, who had at his disposal nine South Vietnamese battalions: four Ranger, three Airborne and two Marine.

The U.S. command saw this as an ideal area to test new air mobility tactics. Air mobility called for battalion-sized forces to be delivered, supplied and extracted from an area of action using helicopters. Since the heavy weapons of a normal combined-arms force could not follow, the infantry would be supported by coordinated close air support, artillery and aerial rocket fire, arranged from a distance and directed by local observers. The new tactics had been developed in the U.S. by the 11th Air Assault Division (Test), which was renamed as the 1st Cavalry Division (Airmobile). The division's troopers dubbed themselves the "Air Cav" (Air Cavalry) and in July 1965 began deploying to Camp Radcliff, An Khê, Vietnam. By November, most of the division's three brigades were ready for operations.

The U.S. deployment caused the B3 Front Command to bring forward an attack on the U.S. Army Special Forces Plei Me camp, some 45 km southwest of Pleiku, which was originally planned for December. The assault was instead launched October 19 with only two Regiments, the 32nd and 33rd, instead of the planned three, before the Air Cavalry troops were combat ready. The plan was to attack the camp with the 33rd Regiment while the 32nd Regiment would lie in wait to ambush the ARVN relief force that would inevitably be sent from Pleiku. Once the relief force was destroyed, the two regiments were to join and take the camp. The initial attack was repulsed with the help of strong air support, and a small relief force reinforced the camp on the morning of the 22nd. The main relief force, advancing south from Pleiku on route 6C, was duly ambushed at 18:00 the next day. After a two-hour battle the ambushing forces were beaten off, but the ARVN, discouraged from moving any further, set up a defensive position, and did not reach the camp at Plei Me until dusk on the 25th. The PAVN forces withdrew west towards the Chu Pong Massif.

At the end of October, after the siege of Plei Me was lifted, General Westmoreland ordered General Harry Kinnard to take his division on to the offensive and seize the initiative in Pleiku province. Initial operations were conducted by 1st Brigade, and on November 1 they captured a PAVN aid station south west of Plei Me. Further engagements over the next few days revealed the arrival of the PAVN 66th Regiment. Having taken increasing casualties, 1st Brigade was relieved by 3rd Brigade, the handover being completed over the period November 7–12.

On November 11, intelligence source revealed the disposition of the three PAVN regiments: the 66th at vicinity YA9104, the 33rd at YA 940010 and the 32nd at YA 820070. On November 12, the 3rd Brigade was given orders by General Stanley R. Larsen, I Field Force, Vietnam, commander, and General Richard T. Knowles, 1st Air Cavalry Division Forward Headquarters commander, to prepare for "an air assault near the foot of the Chu Pongs", at 13°34′11″N 107°40′54″E, 14 miles (23 km) west of Plei Me.

On November 13, 3rd Brigade Commander Colonel Thomas W. Brown, acting following the order issued by Gen. Larsen and Gen. Knowles, met with Lieutenant Colonel Hal Moore the commander of the 1st Battalion, 7th Cavalry Regiment, and told him "to conduct an airmobile assault the following morning" and to conduct search and destroy operations through 15 November. Meanwhile, an ARVN intelligence source by intercept of radio communication indicated that some PAVN B3 Front recon elements and transportation units had already moved out of their assembly areas to attack the Plei Me camp.

Landing zones

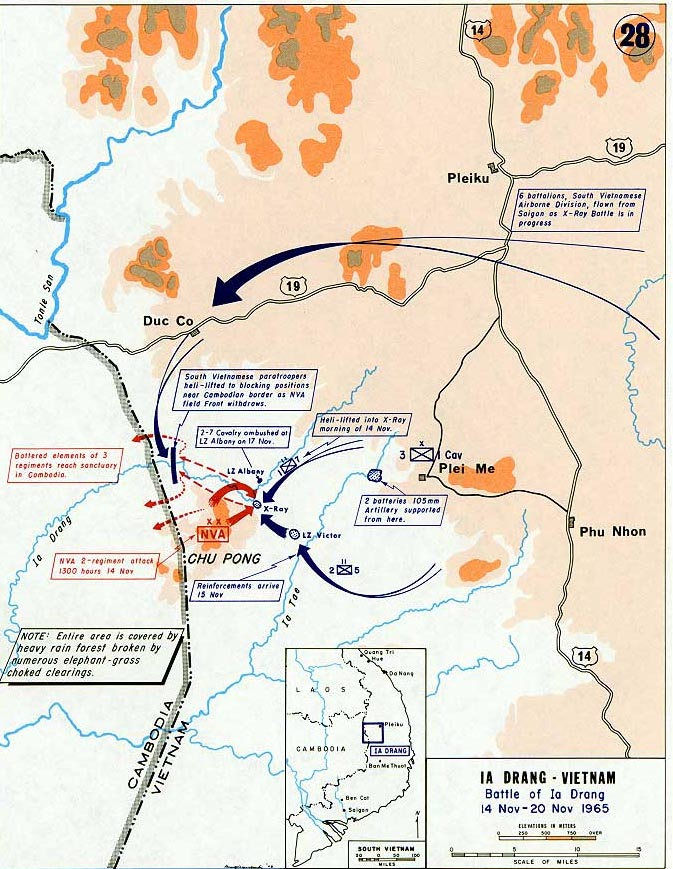
The Battle of Ia Drang (1965)

Col. Brown selected Lt. Col. Moore and his men for the mission, with the explicit orders not to attempt to scale the mountain. There were several clearings in the area that had been designated as possible helicopter landing zones, typically named for a letter of the NATO phonetic alphabet. Moore selected:

- LZ X-Ray: at 13°34′4.6″N 107°42′50.4″E as his landing zone, a flat clearing surrounded by low trees at the eastern base of the Chu Pong Massif and bordered by a dry creek bed on the west. The Ia Drang River was about 2 km (1 mi) to the northwest.
- LZ Albany: about 2.5 km (2 mi) to the northeast of X-Ray at 13°35′43″N 107°42′55″E
- LZ Columbus: about 2.2 km (1 mi) east of Albany at 13°35′20.8″N 107°44′29″E
- LZ Tango: about 2 km (1 mi) to the north of X-Ray at 13°35′28.8″N 107°42′46″E
- LZ Yankee: a similar distance south of X-Ray at 13°33′14.1″N 107°43′1.3″E. LZ Yankee was on sloping ground and could only fit about 6–8 helicopters at one time.
- LZ Whiskey: 2.1 km (1 mi) south-east at 13°33′17.8″N 107°43′40.8″E
- LZ Victor: at 13°33′33″N 107°43′47.8″E about 6 km (4 mi) to the south-southeast.

Artillery support would be provided from fire support base "FSB Falcon", about 8 km (5 mi) to the northeast of X-Ray at 13°37′22″N 107°45′51″E.

General Knowles stated that he had selected the initial landing zone used by Hal Moore and his troops, knowing quite well that the PAVN lacked anti-aircraft guns and heavy mortars that had been destroyed during the attack on the Plei Me camp and that the PAVN could have positioned on the hillsides overlooking the landing zone to gun down the helicopters and to decimate the cavalry troops landing on the ground.

LZ X-Ray was approximately the size of a misshapen football field, some 100 meters in length (east to west). It was estimated that only eight UH-1 Hueys could fit in the clearing at a given time. The 1st Battalion, 7th Cavalry (1/7) was typical for U.S. Army units of the time, consisting of three rifle companies and a heavy weapons company: A-Alpha Company, B-Bravo Company, C-Charlie Company and D-Delta Company... about 450 men in total of the 765 of the battalion's authorized strength. They were to be shuttled by 16 Huey transport helicopters, which could generally carry 10 to 12 equipped troopers, so the battalion would have to be delivered in several "lifts" carrying just less than one complete company each time. Each lift would take about 30 minutes. Moore arranged the lifts to deliver Bravo Company first, along with his command team, followed by Alpha and Charlie Companies, and finally Delta Company. Moore's plan was to move Bravo and Alpha Companies northwest past the creek bed, and Charlie Company south toward the mountain. Delta Company, which comprised special weapons forces including mortar, recon, and machine gun units, was to be used as the battlefield reserve. In the center of the LZ was a large termite hill that was to become Moore's command post. Furthermore, the Bravo Company of the 2nd Battalion, 7th Cavalry closed in at 18:00.

== LZ X-Ray ==
=== Day 1: November 14, 1965 ===
==== Landings ====
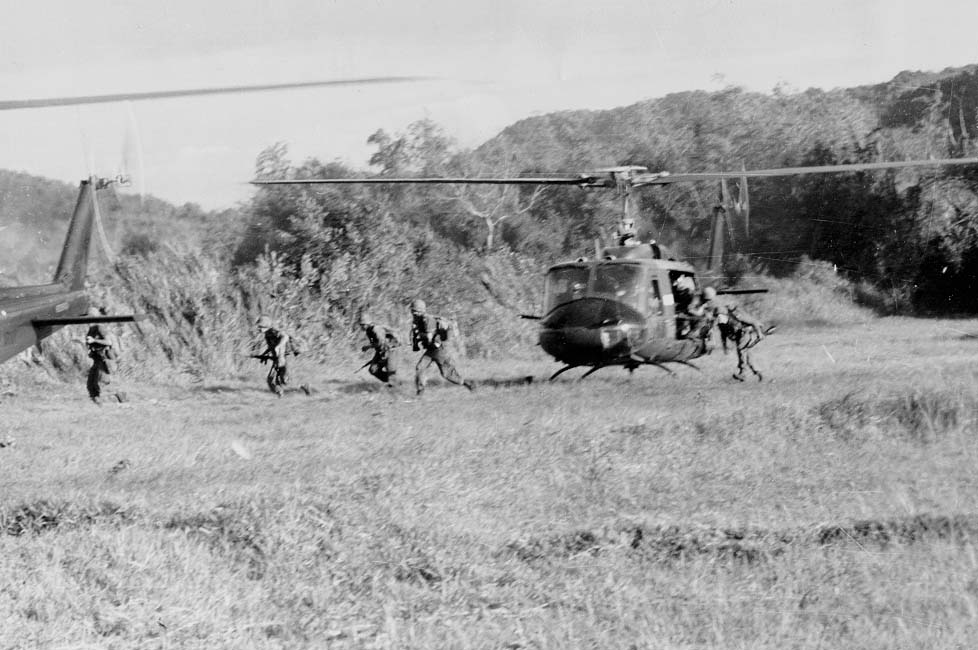
1st Battalion, 7th Cavalry troopers landing at LZ X-Ray

On November 14, an ARVN intelligence source by intercept of radio communication indicated that before dawn, some assault elements of the PAVN B3 Front started moving out of their assembly areas to attack the Plei Me camp.

At 10:48, the first troops of the 1st Battalion, 7th Cavalry (1/7) arrived at LZ X-Ray with members of B Company touching down after about 30 minutes of bombardment via artillery, aerial rockets and air strikes. The troops were inserted about 200 meters from the position of the PAVN 9th Battalion, 66th Regiment.

The air assault insertion had the effect of causing the B3 Front to postpone the attack on the Plei Me camp. B3 Front Command fell for the subterfuge, decided to postpone the attack on Plei Me camp, and met the new threat with its 7th and 9th Battalions, while the remaining units of its force were put on hold at their staging positions.

Accompanying Captain John Herren's B Company were Moore and his 1st Battalion command group. Instead of attempting to secure the entire landing zone with such a limited force, most of B Company was kept near the center of the LZ as a strike force, while smaller units were sent out to reconnoiter the surrounding area. Following their arrival, Herren ordered B Company to move west past the creek bed. Within approximately 30 minutes, one of his squads under Sgt. John Mingo surprised and captured an unarmed deserter from the PAVN 33rd Regiment. The prisoner revealed that there were three PAVN battalions on the Chu Pong Massif – an estimated 1,600 troops compared to fewer than 200 American soldiers on the ground at that point. At 11:20, the second lift from the 1st battalion arrived, with the rest of B Company and one platoon of Capt. Tony Nadal's A Company. Fifty minutes later, the third lift arrived, consisting of the other two platoons of A Company. A Company took up positions to the rear and left flank of B Company along the dry creek bed, and to the west and to the south facing perpendicular down the creek bed.

At 12:15, the first shots were fired on the three platoons of B Company that were patrolling the jungle northwest of the dry creek bed. Five minutes later, Herren ordered his 1st Platoon under Lt. Al Devney and 2nd Platoon under Lt. Henry Herrick to advance abreast of each other and the 3rd Platoon (under Lt. Dennis Deal) to follow as a reserve unit. Lt. Devney's 1st Platoon led approximately 100 yards (91 m) west of the creek bed, with Herrick's 2nd Platoon to his rear and right flank. Just before 13:00, Devney's 1st platoon was heavily assaulted on both flanks by the PAVN, taking casualties and becoming pinned down in the process. It was around this point that Herrick radioed in that his 2nd Platoon were taking fire from their right flank, and that he was pursuing a squad of PAVN in that direction.

Knowles called Kinnard to report that the 1st Battalion, 7th Cavalry had engaged the enemy and requested an additional battalion – the 2nd Battalion, 5th Cavalry – to counter the PAVN 7th and 9th Battalions.

==== Herrick's platoon is cut off ====
In pursuit of the PAVN on his right flank, Herrick's 2nd Platoon, B Company, was quickly spread out over a space of around 50 meters, and became separated from the rest of 1/7 by approximately 100 meters. Soon, Herrick radioed in to ask whether he should enter or circumvent a clearing that his platoon had come across in the bush. Herrick expressed concerns that he might become cut off from the battalion if he tried to skirt the clearing and therefore would be leading his men through it in pursuit of the enemy. An intense firefight quickly erupted in the clearing; during the first three or four minutes his platoon inflicted heavy losses on the PAVN who streamed out of the trees, while his men did not take any casualties. Herrick soon radioed in that the enemy were closing in around his left and right flanks. Capt. Herren responded by ordering Herrick to attempt to link back with Devney's 1st Platoon. Herrick replied that there was a large enemy force between his men and 1st Platoon. The situation quickly disintegrated for Herrick's 2nd Platoon, which began taking casualties as the PAVN attack persisted. Herrick ordered his men to form a defensive perimeter on a small knoll in the clearing. Within approximately 25 minutes, five men of 2nd Platoon were killed, including Herrick who, before dying, radioed Herren to report that he was hit and was passing command over to Sgt. Carl Palmer, ordered the signals codes to be destroyed and artillery support to be called in. 2nd Platoon was technically under the command of SFC Mac McHenry, but he was positioned elsewhere on the perimeter. Sgts. Palmer and Robert Stokes were also dead, leaving Sgt. Ernie Savage, 3rd Squad Leader, to assume command by virtue of being close to the radio, and proceeded to call in repeated artillery support around the 2nd Platoon's position. By this point, eight men of the platoon had been killed and 13 wounded.

Under Savage's leadership, and with the extraordinary care of the 2nd Platoon's medic Charlie Lose, the platoon held the knoll for the duration of the battle at X-Ray. Spec. Galen Bungum, 2nd Platoon, B Company, later said of the stand at the knoll: "We gathered up all the full magazines we could find and stacked them up in front of us. There was no way we could dig a foxhole. The handle was blown off my entrenching tool and one of my canteens had a hole blown through it. The fire was so heavy that if you tried to raise up to dig you were dead. There was death and destruction all around." Savage later recalled of the repeated PAVN assaults: "It seemed like they didn't care how many of them were killed. Some of them were stumbling, walking right into us. Some had their guns slung and were charging bare-handed. I didn't run out of ammo – had about thirty magazines in my pack. And no problems with the M16. An hour before dark three men walked up on the perimeter. I killed all three of them 15 feet away."

==== Fight for the creek bed ====
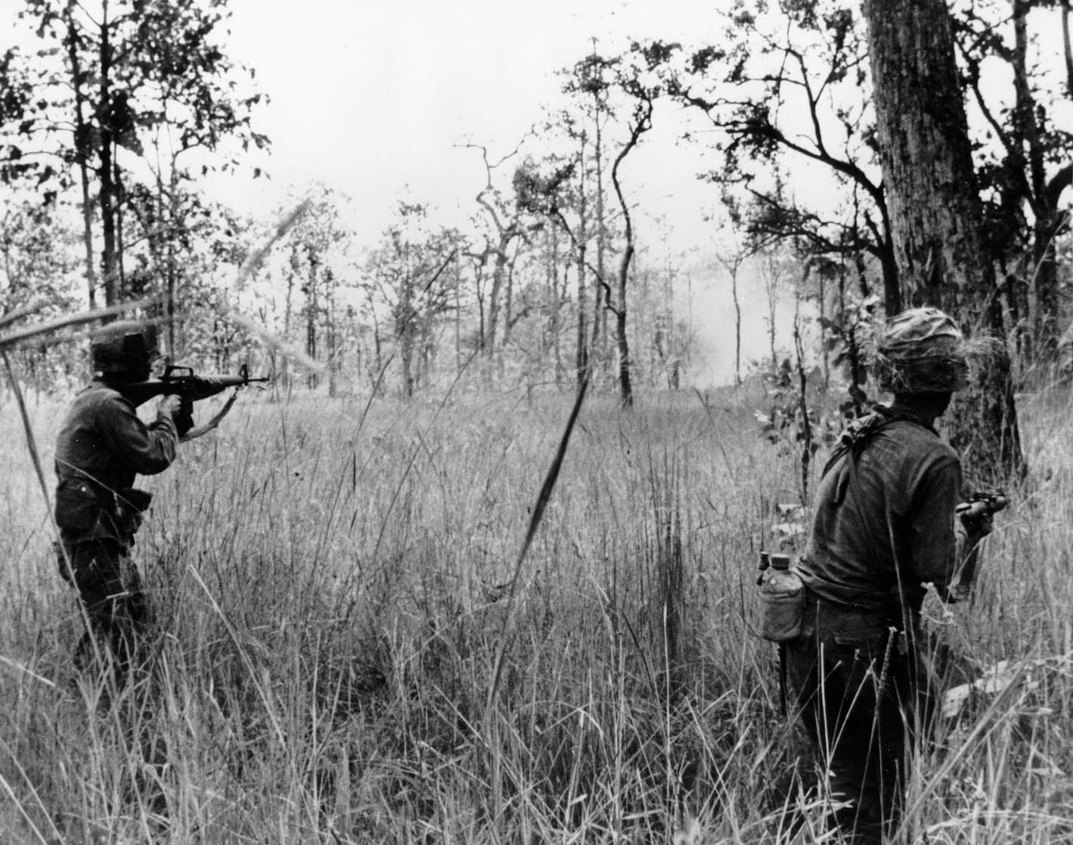
1st Cavalry troops engage PAVN

With 2nd Platoon, B Company cut off and surrounded, the rest of 1/7 fought to maintain a perimeter. At 13:32, C Company under Capt. Bob Edwards arrived, taking up positions along the south and southwest facing the mountain. At around 13:45, through his operations officer flying above the battlefield (Capt. Matt Dillon), Moore called in air strikes, artillery and aerial rocket artillery on the mountain to prevent the North Vietnamese from advancing on the battalion's position.

Lt. Bob Taft's 3rd Platoon, A Company, confronted approximately 150 PAVN soldiers advancing down the length and sides of the creek bed (from the south) toward the battalion. The platoon's troopers were told to drop their packs and move forward for the assault. The resulting exchange was particularly costly for the platoon — its lead forces were quickly cut down. 3rd Platoon was forced to pull back, and its leader Lt. Taft was killed. Sgt. Lorenzo Nathan, a Korean War veteran, took command of 3rd Platoon which was able to halt the PAVN advance down the creek bed. The PAVN forces shifted their attack to 3rd Platoon's right flank in an attempt to flank B Company. Their advance was quickly stopped by Lt. Walter "Joe" Marm's 2nd Platoon, A Company, situated on B Company's left flank. Moore had ordered Captain Nadal (A Company) to lend B Company one of his platoons, in an effort to allow Herren (B Company) to attempt to fight through to Herrick's (2nd Platoon, B Company) position. From Lt. Marm's (2nd Platoon, A Company) new position, his men killed some 80 PAVN troops with close range machine gun, rifle, and grenade assault. The surviving PAVN made their way back to the creek bed, where they were cut down by fire from the rest of A Company. Taft's (3rd Platoon, A Company) dog tags were discovered on the body of a PAVN soldier who had been killed by Taft's platoon. Upset that Taft's body had been left on the battlefield, Nadal (A Company commander) and his radio operator, Sgt. Jack Gell, brought his and the bodies of other Americans back to the creek bed under heavy fire.

==== Attack from the south ====
At 14:30, the last troops of C Company (1/7) arrived, along with the lead elements of D Company (1/7) under Capt. Ray Lefebvre. The insertion took place with intense PAVN fire pouring into the landing zone, and the Huey crews and newly arrived 1/7 troopers suffered many casualties. The small contingent of D Company took up position on A Company's left flank. C Company, assembled along the south and southwest in full strength, was met within minutes by a head-on assault. C Company's commander, Capt. Edwards, radioed in that an estimated 175 to 200 PAVN troops were charging his company's lines. With a clear line of sight over their sector of the battlefield, C Company was able to call in and adjust heavy ordnance support with precision, inflicting devastating losses on the PAVN forces. Many PAVN soldiers were burned to death as they scrambled from their bunkers in a hasty retreat, while others were caught in a second barrage of artillery shells. By 15:00 the attack had been stopped, and one hour after launching the assault the PAVN forces withdrew.

==== Attack on Alpha and Delta Companies ====
At approximately the same time, A Company and the lead elements of D Company (which had accompanied Alpha Company at the perimeter in the vicinity of the creek bed) were subjected to a fierce PAVN attack. Covering the critical left flank were two of A Company's machine gun crews positioned 75 yards (70 m) southwest of the company's main position. Spec. Theron Ladner (with his assistant gunner PFC Rodriguez Rivera) and Spec. 4 Russell Adams (with his assistant gunner Spec. 4 Bill Beck) had positioned their guns 10 yards (9 m) apart, and proceeded to pour heavy fire into the PAVN forces attempting to cut into the perimeter between C and A Companies. Moore later credited the two gun teams with preventing the PAVN from rolling up Alpha Company and driving a wedge into the battalion between Alpha and Charlie Companies. Spec. 4 Adams and Pfc. Rivera were severely wounded in the attack. After the two were carried to the battalion's collection point at Moore's command post to await evacuation by air, Spec. 4 Beck, Spec. Ladner and Pfc. Edward Dougherty (an ammo bearer) continued their close range suppression of the PAVN advance. Spec. 4 Beck later said of the battle: "When Doc Nall was there with me, working on Russell, fear, real fear, hit me. Fear like I had never known before. Fear comes, and once you recognize it and accept it, it passes just as fast as it comes, and you don't really think about it anymore. You just do what you have to do, but you learn the real meaning of fear and life and death. For the next two hours I was alone on that gun, shooting at the enemy."

Delta Company's troopers also experienced heavy losses in repelling the PAVN assault and Captain Lefebvre was wounded soon after arriving at LZ X-Ray. One of his platoon leaders, Lt. Raul Taboada, was also severely wounded, and Lefebvre passed command of D Company to SSgt. George Gonzales (who, unknown to Lefebvre, had also been wounded). While medical evacuation helicopters (medevacs) were supposed to transport the battalion's increasing numbers of casualties, they evacuated only two before the pilots called off their mission under intense PAVN fire. Casualties were loaded onto the assault Hueys (lifting the battalion's forces to X-Ray), whose pilots carried load after load of wounded from the battlefield. 1st Battalion, 7th Cavalry's intelligence officer Capt. Tom Metsker (who had been wounded) was fatally hit when helping Lefebvre aboard a Huey.

==== 360-degree perimeter ====
Capt. Edwards (C Company) ordered SSgt. Gonzales who had been given command of D Company by its commander, to position D Company on C Company's left flank, extending the perimeter to cover the southeast side of X-Ray. At 15:20, the last of the 1st battalion arrived and Lt. Larry Litton assumed command of D Company. It was during this lift that one Huey, having approached the landing zone too high, crash-landed on the outskirts of the perimeter near the command post (those on board were quickly rescued by the battalion). With Delta Company's weapons teams on the ground, its mortar units were concentrated with the rest of the battalion's in a single station to support Alpha and Bravo Companies. D Company's reconnaissance platoon (commanded by Lieutenant James Rackstraw) was positioned along the north and east of the landing zone, establishing a 360-degree perimeter over X-Ray. Had the PAVN forces circled around to the north of the U.S. positions prior to this point, they would have found their approach unhindered.

==== Second push to the lost platoon ====
As the PAVN attack on Alpha Company diminished, Moore organized another effort to rescue 2nd Platoon, B Company. At 15:45, Moore ordered Alpha Company and Bravo Company to evacuate their casualties and pull back from engagement with the PAVN. Shortly after, Alpha and Bravo Companies began their advance from the creek bed toward 2nd Platoon, B Company and soon suffered casualties. At one point, B Company's advance was halted by a firmly entrenched PAVN machine-gun position at a large termite hill. Lt. Marm, 2nd Platoon, A Company, fired a light anti-tank weapon (LAW) at the machine-gun position, charged the position with grenades while under fire, and killed the remaining PAVN at the machine-gun position with rifle fire. The following day, a dozen dead PAVN troops (including one officer) were found in the position. Marm was wounded in the neck and jaw in the assault and was later awarded the Medal of Honor for his lone assault. The second push had advanced just over 75 yards (70 m) toward the lost platoon's position before being stopped by the PAVN. Alpha Company's 1st Platoon, leading the advance, was at risk of becoming separated from the battalion, and at one point it was being engaged by an American M60 machine gun that had been taken by the PAVN from a dead 2nd Platoon gunner. The impasse lasted between 20 and 30 minutes before Nadal (A Company) and Herren (B Company) requested permission to withdraw back to X-Ray (to which Moore agreed).

==== Americans dig in for the night ====
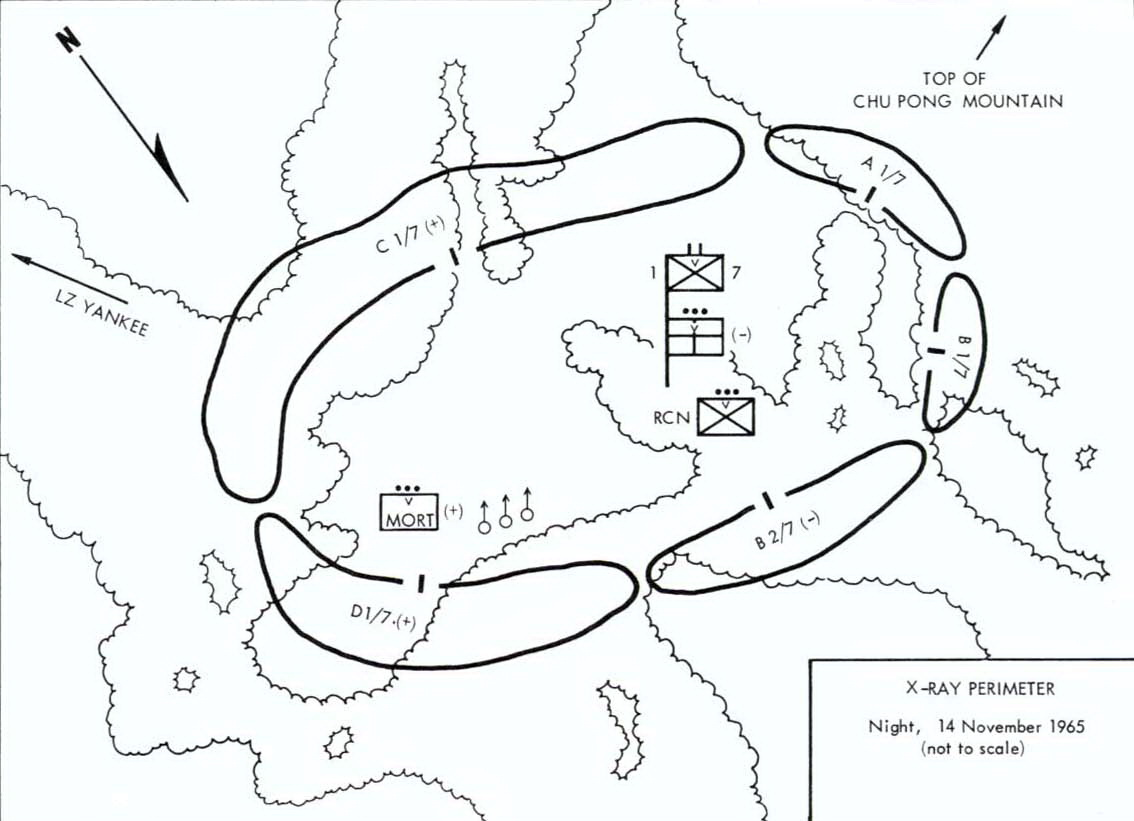
X-Ray perimeter, night of November 14

Near 17:00, the lead elements of Bravo Company of 2nd Battalion, 7th Cavalry (2/7) arrived at LZ X-Ray to reinforce the embattled 1st Battalion; the company closed in at 18:00 hours. In preparation for a defensive position to last the night, Moore ordered Bravo Company's commander Capt. Myron Diduryk to place two of his platoons between B/1/7 and D/1/7 on the northeast side of the perimeter. Diduryk's 2nd Platoon, B Company (under Lt. James Lane), was used to reinforce C/1/7's position (which was stretched over a disproportionately long line). By nightfall, the battle had taken a heavy toll on Moore's battalion (1/7): B company had taken 47 casualties (including one officer) and A Company had taken 34 casualties (including three officers); C company had taken four casualties.

Around this time, Colonel Brown ordered the 2nd Battalion, 5th Cavalry to be heli-lifted to LZ Victor, at 5 kilometers from LZ X-Ray to be ready to reinforce the 1st Battalion, 7th Cavalry and the 2nd Battalion, 7th Cavalry the next morning. The American forces were placed on full alert throughout the night. Under the light of a bright moon, the PAVN probed every company on the perimeter (with the exception of D/1/7) in small squad-sized units. The Americans exercised some level of restraint in their response. The M60 gun crews, tactically positioned around the perimeter to provide for multiple fields of fire, were told to hold their fire until otherwise ordered (so as to conceal their true location from the PAVN). Second Platoon of B Company (1/7) under the leadership of Sgt. Savage, suffered three sizable assaults of the night (one just before midnight, one at 03:15, and one at 04:30). The PAVN, using bugles to signal their forces, were repelled from the knoll with artillery, grenade and rifle fire. Savage's "lost platoon" survived the night without taking additional casualties.

At 18:50, Gen. Kinnard discussed with Gen. Larsen the possibility of having a B-52 strike at the area of LZ X-Ray. At 21:00 the 1st Air Cavalry selected coordinates for B-52 strike in Code – YA 870000, YA 830000, YA 830070, YA 870070 with alternative targets (in Code) YA 8607, YA 9007, YA 9000, YA 8600.

=== Day 2: November 15 ===
==== Attack at dawn ====
At 06:00 J3/MACV notified 1st Air Cavalry that the time over target of the B-52 strike was set for 16:00.

Just before dawn at 06:20, Moore ordered his battalion's companies to put out reconnaissance patrols to probe for PAVN forces. At 06:50, patrols from Charlie Company's 1st Platoon (under Lt. Neil Kroger) and 2nd Platoon (under Lt. John Geoghegan) had advanced 150 yards (140 m) from the perimeter before coming into contact with PAVN troops. A firefight broke out, and the patrols quickly withdrew to the perimeter. Shortly after, an estimated 200-plus PAVN troops charged 1st and 2nd Platoons of C Company on the south side of the perimeter. Heavy ordnance support was called in, but the PAVN were soon within 75 yards (70 m) of the 1st Battalion's lines. Their fire began to cut through Charlie Company's positions and into the command post and the American lines across the LZ. 1st and 2nd platoons suffered significant casualties in this assault, including Lts. Kroger and Geoghegan. Geoghegan was killed while attempting to rescue one of his wounded men, Pfc. Willie Godboldt (who died of his wounds shortly thereafter). Two M60 crews (under Spec. James Comer and Spec. 4s Clinton Poley, Nathaniel Byrd and George Foxe) were instrumental in preventing the PAVN advance from completely overrunning Geoghegan's lines. Following this attack, Charlie Company's 3rd Platoon under Lt. William Franklin came under assault. C Company's commander, Capt. Edwards was seriously wounded and Lt. John Arrington assumed command of the company and was himself wounded while receiving instructions from Edwards. C Company's command then passed to Platoon Sgt. Glenn A. Kennedy. Lt. Franklin was also seriously wounded. The battalion was being attacked in two directions.

==== Three-pronged attack ====
At 07:45, the PAVN launched an assault on Crack Rock, near its connection with the beleaguered C/1/7. Enemy fire started to hit the 1st Battalion command post, which suffered one medic killed and several other troops wounded (including one of Moore's own radio operators, Spec. 4 Robert Ouellette). Under heavy attack on three sides, the battalion fought off repeated waves of PAVN infantry. It was during this battle that Spec. Willard Parish of Charlie Company, situated on Delta Company's lines, earned a Silver Star for suppressing an intense PAVN assault in his sector. After expending his M60 ammunition, Parish resorted to his .45 sidearm to repel PAVN forces that advanced within 20 yards (18 m) of his foxhole. After the battle, more than 100 dead PAVN troops were discovered around his position.

As the battle along the southern line intensified, Lt. Charlie W. Hastings (U.S. Air Force liaison forward air controller) was instructed by Moore (based on criteria established by the Air Force) to transmit the code phrase "Broken Arrow", which relayed that an American combat unit was in danger of being overrun. In so doing, Hastings was calling on all available support aircraft in South Vietnam to come to the 1st Battalion, 7th Cavalry's defense, drawing on a significant arsenal of heavy ordnance support. On Charlie Company's broken lines, PAVN troops walked the lines for several minutes, killing wounded Americans and stripping their bodies of weapons and other items. It was around this time, at 07:55, that Moore ordered his men to throw colored smoke grenades to mark the battalion perimeter. Aerial fire support was then called in on the PAVN at close range – including those along Charlie Company's lines. Shortly afterwards, Moore's command post was subjected to a friendly fire incident by two F-100 Super Sabre dropping napalm. Seeing the approaching F-100's about to drop their bombs dangerously close to the American positions, Hastings frantically radioed them to abort the attack and change course. The pilot of the second F-100, Lt.Col. Harold Comstock, complied and disengaged, but the ordnance from the first F-100 had already been dropped. Despite Hastings' best efforts, several American soldiers were wounded or killed by this air strike. News reporter Joe Galloway, who helped carry one of the badly wounded men (who died two days later) to an aid station, tried to attach a name to the death occurring around him, discovering that this particular soldier's name was Pfc. Jimmy Nakayama of Rigby, Idaho who had been a 2nd Lt. in the National Guard. Galloway later shared how that same week Nakayama became a father. Galloway also noted "[a]t LZ XRay 80 men died and 124 were wounded, many of them terribly", and that the death toll for the entire battle was 234 Americans killed and perhaps as many as 2,000 North Vietnamese soldiers.

At 08:00, the 2nd Battalion, 5th Cavalry set out on foot from LZ-Victor to reinforce LZ X-Ray.

At 09:10, the first elements of Alpha Company (2/7), under Capt. Joel Sugdinis, arrived at X-Ray. Capt. Sugdinis's forces reinforced the survivors of Charlie Company (1/7). By 10:00, the PAVN had begun to withdraw from the battle, although sporadic fire still continued to harass the Americans. Charlie Company, having inflicted scores of losses on the PAVN, had suffered 42 killed in action (KIA) and 20 wounded in action (WIA) over the course of the 2 1/2-hour assault. Lt. Rick Rescorla, a platoon leader of Capt. Diduryk's Bravo Company (2/7) after having policed up the battlefield in Charlie Company's sector following the assaults, later remarked: "There were American and NVA bodies everywhere. My area was where Lt. Geoghegan's platoon (2nd Platoon, C Company) had been. There were several dead NVA around his platoon command post. One dead trooper was locked in contact with a dead NVA, hands around the enemy's throat. There were two troopers – one black, one Hispanic – linked tight together. It looked like they had died trying to help each other."

At 09:30, Col. Brown, the commander of the 3rd Brigade, 1st Cavalry Division (Airmobile), landed at LZ X-Ray to make preparation to withdraw the 1st Battalion, 7th Cavalry, deeming its job done. He intended to establish a 3rd Air Cavalry Brigade forward command post in order to take over the command of the battlefield with the presence of the 1st Battalion, 7th Cavalry, the 2nd Battalion, 7th Cavalry and the 2nd Battalion, 5th Cavalry on the ground at LZ X-Ray. When Moore refused to relinquish the command of his battalion, Brown contented to notify him before leaving that the 1st Battalion, 7th Cavalry was withdrawn the next day.

==== Reinforcements ====
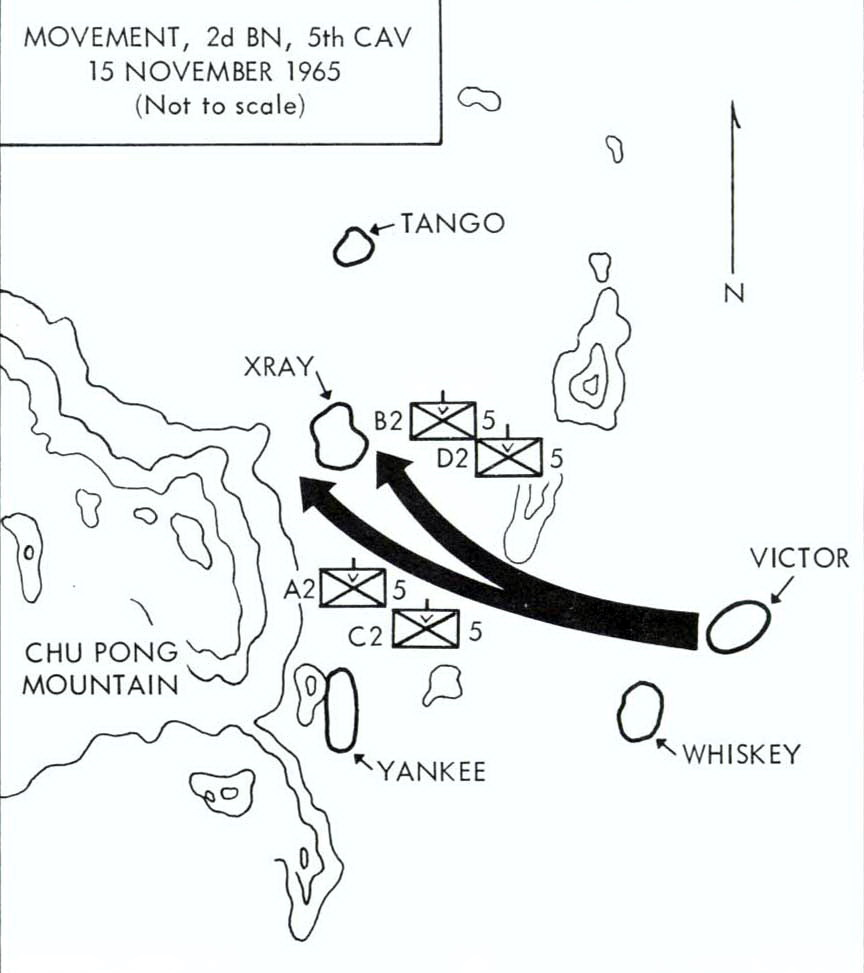
Relief of LZ X-Ray on November 15

Given the tempo of combat at LZ X-Ray and the losses being suffered, other units of the 1st Cavalry Division (Airmobile) planned to land nearby and then move overland to X-Ray. The 2nd Battalion, 5th Cavalry (2/5), was to be flown into LZ Victor, about 3.5 kilometers east-southeast of LZ X-Ray. 2/5 flew in at 08:00 and quickly organized to move out, the trip taking about 4 hours. Most of this was uneventful until they were approaching X-Ray. At about 10:00, some 800 yards (730 m) to the east of the LZ, Alpha Company (2/7) received some light fire and had to set up a combat front. At 12:05, Lt. Col Tully's 2/5 troopers had arrived at the LZ.

Because the 2nd Battalion, 5th Cavalry stealthily closed in the battlefield by foot instead of by heli-lift, B3 Front was unaware that the opponent troop ratio had switched from 2:2 to 3:2.

At 10:30 General DePuy, J3/MACV called Colonel Barrow to make sure that the B-52 had been cleared with General Vĩnh Lộc and if the elements of 1st Cavalry had received the time on target 16:00 hours restriction and would comply.

==== Third push to the lost platoon ====
Using a plan devised by Moore, Tully (2/5) commanded B/1/7, A/2/5, and C/2/5 in a third major effort to relieve the lost B Company platoon of 1/7 under Sgt. Ernie Savage. Making use of fire support, the relief force slowly made its way to the knoll without encountering PAVN. 2nd Platoon, B Company had survived but at great cost; out of the 29 men, 9 were KIA and 13 WIA. At around 15:30, the relief force started to encounter sniper fire and began carrying the wounded and dead of the lost platoon back to X-Ray. The expanded force at X-Ray, consisting of Moore's weakened 1/7, two companies of the 2/7, and Tully's 2/5, consolidated at X-Ray for the night. At the LZ, the wounded and dead were evacuated, and the remaining American forces dug in and fortified their lines.

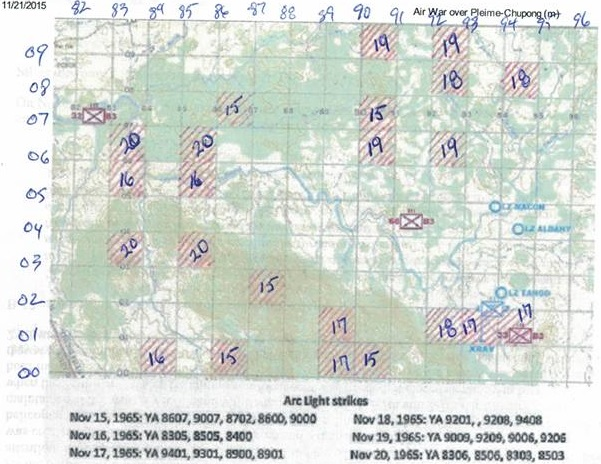
B-52 strike on PAVN positions, November 15–20

At precisely 16:00, the first wave of B-52 carpet bombings fell at YA 8702 (about 7 kilometers west of LZ X-Ray), aiming mainly to strike the units of the 32nd Regiment that were located about 5 kilometers further west and would carry on for 5 consecutive days. Lt. Col. Nguyễn Hữu An was on his way from his forward command post to the LZ X-Ray to meet with Lã Ngọc Châu, 66th Regiment Political Commissar, when he first saw the waves of B-52 carpet bombings raining down. Air Cavalry units at the scene reported seeing three .50 caliber machine gun positions firing at the aircraft that were directly in path of strike. General DePuy, J3/MACV, who executed this B-52 airstrike stated that "this is the fastest a strike of this nature had ever been laid-on."

At 16:30, Brigadier General Knowles, 1st Cavalry Division (Airmobile) Forward CP Commander, landed at the LZ X-Ray to announce the withdrawal of the 1st Battalion, 7th Cavalry set for the next day.

At 20:40, 1st Air Cavalry requested for second B-52 strike with primary targets set for YA 830050, YA 850050, YA 843000 and alternative set for YV 890980, YV 910980, YV 890950, YV 910950.

Around midnight, Moore received from Lt. Colonel Edward C. (Shy) Meyer, 3rd Brigade executive officer, a message saying that Westmoreland's headquarters wanted him to "leave X-Ray early the next morning for Saigon to brief him and his staff on the battle." He vehemently objected to the order and was allowed to remain with his battalion until its withdrawal planned for the next morning.

=== Day 3: November 16 ===
The American lines at X-Ray were harassed during the night of 15 November by PAVN probes. Shortly before 04:00 of the third day grenade booby traps and trip flares set by Diduryk's Bravo Company (2/7) began to erupt. At 04:22 the PAVN launched a fierce assault against Diduryk's men. Bravo fought off this attack by an estimated 300 PAVN in minutes. A decisive factor in this stand, in addition to rifle and machine gun fire from B Company's lines, was the skilled placement of artillery strikes by Diduryk's forward observer, Lt. Bill Lund. Making use of four artillery batteries, Lund organized fire into separate concentrations along the battlefield with devastating consequences for the waves of advancing PAVN.

The PAVN repeated their assault on Diduryk's lines 20 minutes after the first attack as flares dropped from American C-123 Provider aircraft illuminated the battlefield to B Company's advantage. For around 30 minutes B Company fought off the PAVN advance with a combination of small arms and Lund's skilled organization of artillery strikes. Shortly after 05:00 a third attack was launched against B Company, which was repelled by Lt. James Lane's platoon within 30 minutes. At almost 06:30 the PAVN launched a fourth attack on Diduryk's men – this time in the vicinity of B Company's command post. Again, Lund's precision in ordering artillery strikes cut down scores of PAVN soldiers, while Diduryk's men repelled those who survived using rifle and machine gun fire. At the end of these attacks, with daybreak approaching, Diduryk's Company had only six lightly wounded men among its ranks – with none killed.

==== LZ X-Ray secured ====
At 08:30, Gen. DePuy asked Gen. Knowles if he had plans for exploitation of yesterday's strike, and if he had a plan to commit another battalion for a total of 5 – besides the 1/7, 2/7, 2/5 and 1/9 Air Cav Battalions in the area. At 09:15, Knowles wanted the cavalry units on the ground to organize an exploitation of B-52 strike target operation. Moore responded that he had plans to send in 1st Cav, although at the present time all units were engaged.

Around 10:30 a.m., 1st Battalion, 7th Cavalry received orders to withdraw from the battle zone while 2nd Battalion, 7th Cavalry and 2nd Battalion, 5th Cavalry took up defensive positions for the night. According to the assessment of ARVN Gen. Vĩnh Lộc, at the LZ X-Ray battle, the PAVN did not have anti-aircraft weapons and heavy mortars and had to resort to "human wave" tactics: "The enemy has lost nearly all their heavy crew-served weapons during the first phase ... Their tactics relied mostly on the 'human waves.'"

The battle was ostensibly over. The PAVN forces had suffered hundreds of casualties and were no longer capable of fighting. U.S. forces had suffered 79 killed and 121 wounded and had been reinforced to levels that would guarantee their safety. Given the situation, there was no reason for U.S. forces to stay in the field, their mission was complete and a success. Moreover, Colonel Brown (3rd Brigade commander), in overall command, was worried about reports that additional PAVN units were moving into the area over the border. He wanted to withdraw the units but Westmoreland demanded that the 2/7 and 2/5 stay at X-Ray to avoid the appearance of a retreat.

The U.S. reported the bodies of 634 PAVN soldiers were found in the vicinity and estimated that 1,215 PAVN were killed a distance away by artillery and airstrikes. Six PAVN were captured. Six PAVN crew-served weapons and 135 individual weapons were captured, and an estimated 75–100 weapons were destroyed. The normal ratio of enemy soldiers killed to weapons captured as later established by the Department of Defense was 3 or 4 to one.

At 12:53, Gen. Westmoreland enquired if the Cavalry had sufficient air support and if the troops were fine. At 16:25, 1st Air Cavalry TOC made an Arc Light request for YV 932985, YV 936996, YA 898005, YA 898019 at 13:00, not later than 17:00. At 18:50, II Corps commanding general concurred with the Arc Light request. Around 20:25, DePuy finalized the plan to have B-52 bombers strike the LZ X-Ray the next day by noon. He received Brown's assurance that the friendly troops had enough lead time and would meet the 3 km safety limits by then.

== LZ Albany ==
=== Day 4: November 17 ===
At 09:00, 1st Air Cavalry TOC submitted an Arc Light request to J3/MACV for 13:00 on 18 November.

Meanwhile, the two remaining battalions abandoned LZ X-Ray and began a tactical march to new landing zones. Lt. Col. Bob Tully, commanding the 2nd Battalion, 5th Cavalry, went to LZ Columbus about 4 km (2 mi) to the northeast, and Lt. Col. Robert McDade, commanding the 2nd Battalion, 7th Cavalry, went to LZ Albany about 4 km (2 mi) to the north-northeast, close to the Ia Drang. Tully's men moved out at 09:00; McDade's followed 10 minutes later. B-52s were on their way from Guam, and their target for the third day of bombing was the slopes of the Chu Pong massif and LZ X-Ray itself. The U.S. ground forces had to move outside a 2 miles (3.2 km) safety zone by midmorning to be clear of the bombardment. With the two remaining battalions quietly abandoning the landing zone by land instead of by helicopters to make way for the B-52 strike, any PAVN troops of the 7th and 9th Battalions at the vacated X-Ray area were caught by surprise.

==== Events leading to an ambush ====
The first indication of PAVN presence was observed by the reconnaissance platoon's point squad, leading the American column. SSgt. Donald J. Slovak, the squad leader, saw "Ho Chi Minh sandal foot markings, bamboo arrows on the ground pointing north, matted grass and grains of rice." After marching about 2,000 meters, Alpha Company (2/7) leading 2/7, headed northwest, while 2/5 continued on to LZ Columbus. Alpha Company came upon some grass huts, which they were directed to burn. At 11:38, Tully's men of 2/5, were logged into its objective, LZ Columbus. PAVN troops in the area consisted of elements the 8th Battalion, 66th Regiment, 1st Battalion, 33rd Regiment and the headquarters of the 3rd Battalion, 33rd Regiment. The 33rd Regiment's battalions were under strength from casualties incurred during the battle at the Plei Me camp, the 8th Battalion was Gen. Mân's reserve battalion, fresh and rested.

The elements of the two PAVN battalions that were involved in the clash with the Air Cavalry troops were: 1st Company, 1st Battalion, 33rd Regiment, 2nd Company, 1st Battalion, 33rd Regiment, 6th Company, 8th Battalion, 66th Regiment, 7th Company, 8th Battalion, 66th Regiment and 8th Company, 8th Battalion, 66th Regiment. While the 2nd Battalion, 7th Cavalry was moving up northwest toward the position of 1st Battalion CP, 33rd Regiment nested at the east side of Ia Drang river, the 8th Company, 8th Battalion, 66th Regiment marched down southeast along the Ia Drang river, and the 6th Company, 8th Battalion, 66th Regiment and 7th Company, 8th Battalion, 66th Regiment marched down on a collision path toward the Air Cavalry unit. The 8th Battalion was led by Lê Xuân Phối.

Alpha Company noticed the sudden absence of air cover and their commander, Capt. Joel Sugdinis, wondered where the aerial rocket artillery choppers were. He soon heard the sound of distant explosions to his rear; the B-52s were making their bombing runs on the Chu Pong massif. Lt. D. P. (Pat) Payne, the recon platoon leader, was walking around some termite hills when he suddenly came upon a PAVN soldier resting on the ground. Payne jumped on the soldier and took him prisoner. Simultaneously, about 10 yards away, his platoon sergeant captured a second PAVN soldier. Other members of the PAVN recon team may have escaped and reported to the headquarters of the 1st Battalion, 33rd Regiment. The PAVN then began to organize an assault on the American column. As word of the capture reached him, McDade ordered a halt as he went forward from the rear of the column to interrogate the prisoners personally. The two captured PAVN soldiers were policed up about 100 yards from the southwestern edge of the Albany clearing, the report of which reached division forward at Pleiku at 11:57.

McDade then called his company commanders of 2/7 forward for a conference; most of whom were accompanied by their radio operators. Alpha Company moved forward to LZ Albany; McDade and his command group were with them. Following orders, the other company commanders were moving forward to join McDade. Delta Company, which was next in the column following Alpha Company, was holding in place; so was Charlie Company, which was next in line. Second Battalion Headquarters Company followed and Alpha Company, 1/5, brought up the rear of the column. The American column was halted in unprepared, open terrain and strung out in 550-yard (500 m) line of march. Most of the units had flank security posted, but the men were worn out from almost 60 hours without sleep and four hours of marching. The elephant grass was chest-high so visibility was limited. The radios for air or artillery support were with the company commanders.

An hour and 10 minutes after the PAVN recon soldiers were captured, Alpha Company and McDade's command group had reached the Albany clearing. McDade and his group walked across the clearing and into a clump of trees. Beyond that clump of trees was another clearing. The remainder of the battalion was in a dispersed column to the east of the LZ. Battalion SgtMaj. James Scott and Sgt. Charles Bass then attempted to question the prisoners again. While they were doing this, Bass heard Vietnamese voices and the interpreter confirmed that these were PAVN talking. Alpha Company had been in the LZ about five minutes and about then, small arms fire began.

==== 2nd Battalion ambushed ====
Lt. Pat Payne's reconnaissance platoon had walked to within 200 yards (180 m) of the headquarters of the PAVN 3rd Battalion, 33rd Regiment; the 550 men of the 8th Battalion, 66th Regiment had been bivouacked to the northeast of the American column. As the Americans rested in the tall grass, PAVN soldiers were coming toward them by the hundreds. It was 13:15. The close quarters battle lasted for 16 hours. PAVN forces first struck at the head of 2nd Battalion, 7th Cavalry's column and rapidly spread down the right or east side of the column in an L-shaped ambush. PAVN troops ran down the length of the column, with units peeling off to attack the outnumbered American soldiers, engaging in hand-to-hand combat.

The 6th Company, 8th Battalion, 66th Regiment made contact head on with 2nd Battalion, 7th Cavalry, the 1st Company, 1st Battalion, 33rd Regiment and 2nd Company, 1st Battalion, 33rd Regiment maneuvered eastward and attacked the lower and upper flanks respectively and the 8th Company, 8th Battalion, 66th Regiment switched its direction north-westward and attacked the column from behind. McDade's command group made it into the clump of trees between the two clearings of LZ Albany. They took cover from rifle and mortar fire within the trees and termite hills. The reconnaissance platoon and 1st Platoon, Alpha Company, provided initial defense at the position. By 13:26, they had been cut off from the rest of the column; the area whence they had come was full of PAVN soldiers. While they waited for air support, the Americans holding LZ Albany drove off any PAVN assaults on them and sniped at the exposed enemy wandering around the perimeter. It was later discovered that the PAVN were mopping up, looking for wounded American soldiers in the tall grass and killing them.

All the while the noise of battle could be heard in the woods as the other companies fought. The 2nd Battalion, 7th Cavalry had been reduced to a small perimeter at Albany composed of survivors of Alpha Company, the recon platoon, survivors from the destroyed Charlie and Delta Companies and the command group. There was also a smaller perimeter at the rear of the column about 500–700 yards due south: Capt. George Forrest's Alpha Company, 1st Battalion, 5th Cavalry. Forrest had run a gauntlet all the way from the conference called by McDade back to his company when the PAVN mortar rounds started coming in. Charlie and Alpha companies lost 70 men in the first few minutes. Charlie Company suffered 45 dead and more than 50 wounded, the heaviest casualties of any unit that fought on Albany. USAF A-1E Skyraiders soon provided support by dropping napalm bombs, but because of the fog of war and the inter-mixing of American and PAVN troops, it is likely that air and artillery strikes killed NVA and American soldiers indiscriminately. During the battle, Lê Xuân Phôi, the PAVN field commander of 8th Battalion, 66th Regiment, was mortally wounded around one hour into the battle while personally leading one of the PAVN attacks and died from his wounds a few hours later after nightfall. Phôi was the only high-ranking officer on either side killed in action during the battle at LZ Albany.

==== American reinforcements arrive ====
At 12:00, B-52s struck the areas further up north of LZ Albany and a battle damage assessment (BDA) was conducted by elements of the Cavalry in the afternoon. At 14:55, Bravo Company, 1st Battalion, 5th Cavalry under Capt. Buse Tully began marching from LZ Columbus to the rear of the 2nd Battalion, 7th Cavalry column that was about 2 miles (3.2 km) away. By 16:30, they came into contact with the Alpha Company (1/5) perimeter under Capt. Forrest. A one-helicopter landing zone was secured and the wounded were evacuated. Tully's men in 2/5 then began to push forward toward where the rest of the ambushed column would be. PAVN soldiers contested their advance and the Americans came under fire from a wood line. Tully's men assaulted the tree line and drove off the PAVN. At 18:25, orders were received to secure into a two-company perimeter for the night. They planned to resume the advance at daybreak.

At around 16:00, Capt. Myron Diduryk's Bravo Company, 2nd Battalion, 7th Cavalry, veterans of the fight at LZ X-Ray, got the word that they would be deployed in the battalion's relief. At 18:45 the first helicopters swept over the Albany clearing and the troopers deployed into the tall grass. Lt. Rick Rescorla, the sole remaining platoon leader in Bravo Company, led the reinforcements into the Albany perimeter, which was expanded to provide better security. The wounded at Albany were evacuated at around 22:30 that evening, the helicopters receiving intense ground fire as they landed and took off. The Americans at Albany then settled down for the night.

=== Day 5: November 18 ===
As Friday, November 18, dawned on the battlefield, U.S. soldiers began to gather up their dead comrades. This task took the better part of two days, as American and PAVN dead were scattered all over the field of battle. Rescorla described the scene as, "a long, bloody traffic accident in the jungle." While securing the battlefield, Rescorla recovered a large, battered, old French army bugle from a dying PAVN soldier. The American soldiers finally left LZ Albany for LZ Crooks at 13°40′5.6″N 107°39′10″E, 6 miles (9.7 km) away, on November 19. The battle at LZ Albany cost the United States Army 155 men killed or missing and 124 wounded. One U.S. soldier, PFC Toby Braveboy, was recovered on November 24 when he waved down a passing Bell H-13 Sioux scout helicopter. About half of the approximately 300 American deaths in the 35 days of Operation Silver Bayonet occurred in this 16-hour fight. The United States reported 403 PAVN troops were killed in this battle and an estimated 150 were wounded, probably a large overestimation. Weapons captured included 112 rifles, 33 light machine-guns, three heavy machine-guns, two rocket launchers and four mortars.

== Effect and aftermath ==
On the last day of the battle (November 18), General Westmoreland visited the 1st Battalion, 7th Cavalry. They were briefed by Lt. Col. Moore about the battle at LZ X-Ray. Westmoreland told them they were being recommended for a Presidential Unit Citation. They then flew to the 3rd Air Cavalry Brigade commanded by Col. Brown who gave them a briefing and they flew over the operation area. Before leaving Pleiku, they also had a meeting with General Vĩnh Lộc, II Corps commander, and General Larsen, IFFV commander, who were involved in the battle at corps level. In this session, with Brown's presence, they reviewed and agreed that the execution of the Battle of Ia Drang was in line with the National Campaign Plan developed by General Thang and General DePuy, the two J-3's of the JGS and MACV. They then flew to Qui Nhơn and went to the hospital to visit the troops of the 2nd Battalion, 7th Cavalry who were wounded in the LZ Albany engagement. After the battle, Westmoreland instructed his J2 and J3 Chiefs to gain more improvements and "to bring a B-52 strike down within seven hours after acquiring suitable intelligence".

As the fight at LZ Albany was coming to an end, the ARVN II Corps Command decided to "finish off" the campaign by introducing the ARVN Airborne Brigade into the battlefield on November 17 with the establishment of a new artillery support base at LZ Crooks, secured by the 2nd Battalion, 5th Cavalry. The 5-day B-52 airstrike operation were carried on for two more days: on November 19, the carpet bombing aimed at the positions of units of the 66th and 33rd Regiments; and on November 20, units of the 32nd Regiment. The ARVN Airborne Brigade pursued the two remaining 635th and 334th Battalions of the 320th Regiments and executed two ambushes: the first on November 20 at the north side and the second on November 24 on the south side of the Ia Drang River. On November 26, with no further contact, the ARVN withdrew from the area.

A 1966 PAVN Central Highlands Front report claimed that in five major engagements with U.S. forces, PAVN forces suffered 559 soldiers killed and 669 wounded. PAVN histories claim the United States suffered 1,500 to 1,700 casualties during the Ia Drang Campaign. The official PAVN history claimed that the Plei Me Campaign, which included Ia Drang, eliminated 1,700 U.S. and 1,270 ARVN troops, shot down 59 helicopters, and destroyed 89 vehicles. The U.S. military confirmed 305 killed and 524 wounded (including 234 killed and 242 wounded between November 14 and 18, 1965), and claimed 3,561 PAVN were killed and more than 1,000 were wounded during engagements with the 1st Cavalry Division troops.

According to ARVN intelligence sources, each of the three PAVN regiments' initial strength was 2,200 soldiers: 1st Battalion-500, 2nd Battalion-500, 3rd Battalion-500, Mortar Company-150, Anti-Aircraft Company-150, Signal Company-120, Transportation Company-150, Medical Company-40, Engineer Company-60, Recon Company-50.

ARVN's II Corps Command recapitulates the losses of the PAVN from 18 October to 26 November as follows: KIA (body count) 4,254, KIA (estimated) 2,270, WIA 1293, captured 179, weapons (crew served) 169, (individual) 1,027. PAVN casualty figures advanced by II Corps Command relied especially on PAVN regimental command posts' own loss reports (as indicated by Maj. Gen. Kinnard), intercepted by ARVN radio listening stations. Furthermore, they include PAVN troop casualties caused by the 5-day Arc Light airstrike that the PAVN and U.S. sides fail to take into account.

As the outcome of the entire campaign, the ARVN claimed that the PAVN were unable to achieve their objectives of overrunning the camp and destroying the relief column at Plei Me, which is confirmed in the B3 Front commander's account, as well as that the entire B3 Field Force strength had been wiped out and the survivors pushed over the Cambodian border.

This battle can be seen as a blueprint for tactics by both sides. The Americans used air mobility, artillery fire and close air support to accomplish battlefield objectives. The PAVN learned that they could neutralize that firepower by quickly engaging American forces at very close range. PAVN Col. Nguyễn Hữu An included his lessons from the battle at X-ray in his orders for Albany, "Move inside the column, grab them by the belt, and thus avoid casualties from the artillery and air." Both Westmoreland and An thought this battle to be a success. This battle was one of the few set piece battles of the war and was one of the first battles to popularize the U.S. concept of the "body count" as a measure of success, as the U.S. claimed that the kill ratio was nearly 10 to 1. The vast majority of casualties inflicted on US forces was through small-arms and light-mortar fire, with Moore noting the PAVN's accurate shooting, well-placed ambushes and coordinated targeting of officers had overwhelmed U.S. positions in small-unit tactics. On the other hand, US forces had emerged from the battle by inflicting casualties through B-52 strikes, aerial rockets and artillery and relying on overwhelming firepower.

Both sides probably inflated the estimates of their opponent's casualties. Lewy states that, according to DOD officials, US "body count" claims of PAVN/VC casualties were inflated at least 30 percent for the Vietnam War as a whole. The U.S. claim of 403 PAVN battle dead at Landing Zone Albany seems an overestimate. McDade (2/7) later claimed he did not report any estimate of PAVN casualties at LZ Albany and had not seen even 200 bodies of PAVN soldiers. Similarly, Moore also acknowledged that the PAVN casualty figures in the fight at LZ X-Ray were inaccurate. He lowered the original body count figure of 834 submitted by his men to 634, considering the former number too high.

In the late 1940s, Gen. Võ Nguyên Giáp wrote about the Việt Minh war against the French: "The enemy will pass slowly from the offensive to the defensive. The blitzkrieg will transform itself into a war of long duration. Thus, the enemy will be caught in a dilemma: He has to drag out the war in order to win it and does not possess, on the other hand, the psychological and political means to fight a long-drawn-out war." After this battle, he said: "We thought that the Americans must have a strategy. We did. We had a strategy of people's war. You had tactics, and it takes very decisive tactics to win a strategic victory... If we could defeat your tactics — your helicopters — then we could defeat your strategy. Our goal was to win the war."

Commenting later on the battle, Moore said, The "peasant soldiers [of North Vietnam] had withstood the terrible high-tech fire storm delivered against them by a superpower and had at least fought the Americans to a draw. By their yardstick, a draw against such a powerful opponent was the equivalent of a victory."

=== Casualties ===
Both sides routinely exaggerated the number of casualties inflicted on the other, and figures vary considerably depending on source.

| Source | Action | US Killed | US Wounded | US Missing | PAVN Killed (body count) | PAVN Killed (estimated) | PAVN Captured |
|---|---|---|---|---|---|---|---|
American (excluding ARVN)
| American (excluding ARVN) | LZ X-Ray | 79 | 121 | – | 634 | 1,215 | 4–6 |
| American (excluding ARVN) | LZ Albany | 155 | 124 | 4 | 403 | 503 | 2 |
| American (excluding ARVN) | LZ Columbus | 3 | 13 | – | – | 27 | – |
| American (excluding ARVN) | Total | 237 killed, 258 wounded, and 4 missing (excluding ARVN) | | | 1,037–1,745 killed | | |
| North Vietnamese | Total | 1,500–1,700 U.S. and 1,275 ARVN | | | 1,228 (559 killed and 669 wounded) | | |

Four American helicopters were shot down and 55 damaged. One USAF A-1E Skyraider was hit by automatic weapons and crashed, killing the pilot.

According to ARVN, they lost 132 killed, 248 wounded, and 18 missing

=== Casualty notification ===
The U.S. Army had not set up casualty-notification teams this early in the war. The notification telegrams at this time were handed over to taxi cab drivers for delivery to the next of kin. Moore's wife, Julia Compton Moore, followed in the wake of the deliveries to widows in the Fort Benning housing complex, grieving with the wives and comforting the children and attended the funerals of all the men killed under her husband's command who were buried at Fort Benning. Her complaints about the notifications prompted the Army to quickly set up two-man teams to deliver them, consisting of an officer and a chaplain. Mrs. Frank Henry, the wife of the battalion executive officer and Mrs. James Scott, wife of the battalion command sergeant major, performed the same duty for the dead of the 2nd Battalion, 7th Cavalry.

== Notable award recipients ==
Although many decorations have been awarded to veterans of the Battle of Ia Drang, in his book We Were Soldiers Once...And Young, Lt. Gen. Harold Moore writes:

We had problems on the awards... Too many men had died bravely and heroically, while the men who had witnessed their deeds had also been killed... Acts of valor that, on other fields, on other days, would have been rewarded with the Medal of Honor or Distinguished Service Cross or a Silver Star were recognized only with a telegram saying,"The Secretary of the Army regrets..." The same was true of our sister battalion, the 2nd of the 7th.

Medal of Honor

- 2nd Lt. Walter Marm, Company A, 1st Battalion, 7th Cavalry, received the Medal of Honor on Nov. 15, 1967, for his actions while serving as a platoon leader on 14 November during the 3-day battle at LZ X-Ray. His medal citation recounts exemplary acts of conspicuous gallantry, some of them performed while severely wounded.
- Helicopter pilots during the battle Capt. Ed Freeman and Maj. Bruce Crandall were each awarded the Medal of Honor on July 16, 2001, and Feb. 26, 2007, respectively, for Freeman's 14 and Crandall's 22 volunteer flights in their unarmed Hueys into LZ X-Ray while enemy fire was so heavy that medical evacuation helicopters refused to approach. With each flight, Crandall and Freeman delivered much needed water and ammunition and extracted wounded soldiers, saving countless lives.

Distinguished Service Cross, Silver Star, and Bronze Star Medal

- Lt. Col. Harold "Hal" Moore, commanding officer of the 1st Battalion, 7th Cavalry Regiment was awarded the Distinguished Service Cross for his actions at LZ X-Ray. His DSC citation commends his "leadership by example", his skill in battle against overwhelming odds and his unwavering courage.
- Sgt. Ernie Savage's precise placement of artillery throughout the siege of the "Lost Platoon" enabled the platoon to survive the long ordeal. For his "gallantry under relentless enemy fire on an otherwise insignificant knoll in the valley of the Ia Drang", Ernie Savage received the Distinguished Service Cross.
- 2nd Lt. John Geoghegan was posthumously awarded the Silver Star, Bronze Star, Purple Heart, and the Air Medal. He was killed during the battle when he rushed to the aid of a soldier in his platoon, Private Willie Godbolt, who was wounded by hostile fire.
- Specialist 4 Bill Beck and Specialist 4 Russell E. Adams (Platoon 3, Company A, 1st Battalion, 7th Cavalry) were awarded the Bronze Star with Valor in 1996.
- Journalist Joseph Galloway is the only civilian awarded the Bronze Star Medal for heroism during the Vietnam War. On Nov. 15, 1965, he disregarded his own safety to help rescue two wounded soldiers while under fire. He was decorated on January 8, 1998.

ARVN Unit Citation

- The 1st Battalion, 7th Cavalry was awarded the RVN Gallantry Cross with Palm by Major General Vĩnh Lộc, II Corps commander.

Presidential Unit Citation

- The 1st Cavalry Division (Airmobile) and Attached Units: Presidential Unit Citation, DAGO 40, 1967: 23 Oct. to 26 Nov. 1965: Distinguished themselves by outstanding performance of duty and extraordinary heroism against an armed enemy in the Republic of Vietnam, becoming the first unit so honored for actions during the Vietnam War.

== In media ==
=== Films ===
- The short film The Battle of Ia Drang Valley (1965) is available for free viewing and download at the Internet Archive.
- We Were Soldiers (2002), war film based on Moore and Galloway's book

=== Literature ===
- Alley, J. L. Bud (2016). The Ghosts of the Green Grass., an account of the ambush of 2nd battalion at LZ Albany
- Gwin, Larry (1999). Baptism -- A Vietnam Memoir., Gwin was Exec Officer, Alpha Company, 2nd Battalion, 7th Cavalry at Ia Drang
- Mason, Robert (1983). Chickenhawk.
- Moore, Harold G.; Galloway, Joseph L. (1992). We Were Soldiers Once... And Young.
- Terry, Wallace (1984). Bloods: An Oral History of the Vietnam War by Black Veterans. Random House. ISBN 0-394-53028-4. (ISBN 978-0-394-53028-4), a book which includes accounts by multiple soldiers who recounted the Battle of Ia Drang

=== Television ===
- Vietnam in HD (November 8–11, 2011), a six-part American documentary television miniseries on The History Channel that covered the Battle of Ia Drang in its first episode.
- The Vietnam War (September 17–28, 2017), a ten-part American documentary by Ken Burns that covered the Battle of Ia Drang in its third episode.

== General and cited sources ==
- Carland, John M. (2000). Combat Operations: Stemming the Tide, May 1965 to October 1966. Government Printing Office. ISBN 978-0-16-087310-2.
- Cash, John A.; Albright, John; Sandstrum, Allan W. (1985) [1970]. "Fight at Ia Drang". Seven Firefights in Vietnam. Washington, D.C.: The United States Army Center of Military History. Archived from the original on 2013-11-05.
- Coleman, J. D. (1988). Pleiku: The Dawn of Helicopter Warfare in Vietnam. New York: St. Martin's Press.
- G3 Journal/I Field Force Vietnam, November 14–26, 1965 generalhieu.com - generalhieu Resources and Information, Archived 2021-06-27 at the Wayback Machine; generalhieu.com - generalhieu Resources and Information, Archived 2019-12-31 at the Wayback Machine; generalhieu.com - generalhieu Resources and Information, Archived 2019-12-31 at the Wayback Machine; generalhieu.com - generalhieu Resources and Information, Archived 2021-06-29 at the Wayback Machine. Document stored at the National Archive, College Park, Maryland.
- Harris, J. P.; Eward, J. Kenneth (2020). Ia Drang 1965: The Struggle for Vietnam's Pleiku Province. Osprey Campaign Series #345. Osprey Publishing. ISBN 978-1-4728-3515-4.
- Head, William P. (2020). "Chapter 3. A Re-assessment of the Battle of Ia Drang Valley, 1965: The Role of Airpower, Heroic Soldiers and the Wrong Lessons". Storms Over the Mekong: Major Battles of the Vietnam War. Texas A&M University Press. pp. 27–55. ISBN 9781623498368.
- Hobson, Chris (2002). Vietnam Air Losses: USAF, USN, USMC, Fixed-Wing Aircraft Losses in Southeast Asia 1961–1973. North Branch, Minnesota: Specialty Press. ISBN 1-85780-115-6.
- Kinnard, William (1966). Pleiku Campaign, After Action Report. Archived from the original on 2017-07-03.
- McChristian, J. A. (1966). Intelligence Aspects of Pleime/Chupong Campaign, J2/MACV. Archived from the original on 2019-12-31.
- Melyan, Wesley R. C. (15 September 1967). Arc Light 1965–1966. HQ PACAF: Checo project, Tactical Evaluation Center.
- Moore, Harold G.; Galloway, Joseph L. (1992). We Were Soldiers Once ... and Young—Ia Drang: The Battle That Changed the War in Vietnam. New York: Harper Perennial. ISBN 0-06-097576-8.
- Nguyễn Hữu An (2005). Chiến Trường Mới, Hồi Ức. Hà Nội: Nhà xuất bản Quân đội Nhân dân.
- Porter, Melvin F. (February 24, 1966). The Siege of Pleime. HQ PACAF: CheCo project, Tactical Evaluation Center.
- Porter, Melvin F. (February 26, 1966). Silver Bayonet. HQ PACAF: CheCo project, Tactical Evaluation Center.
- Vĩnh Lộc (1966). Pleime Trận Chiến Lịch Sử. Viet Nam: Bộ Thông Tin. Archived from the original on 2015-06-28.
- Vinh Loc (1966). Why Pleime. Viet Nam: Information Printing Office. Archived from the original on 2018-09-29.
- Westmoreland, William. General Westmoreland's History Notes (29 August–29 November 1965) generalhieu.com - generalhieu Resources and Information. Archived 2016-10-12 at the Wayback Machine, unpublished MACV files.
