= 20th Field Artillery Regiment (United States) =

- Active: 1916
- Country: United States of America
- Branch: United States Army
- Type: Field artillery
- Motto: "Duty Not Reward"
- Equipment: Multiple Launch Rocket System

Insignia
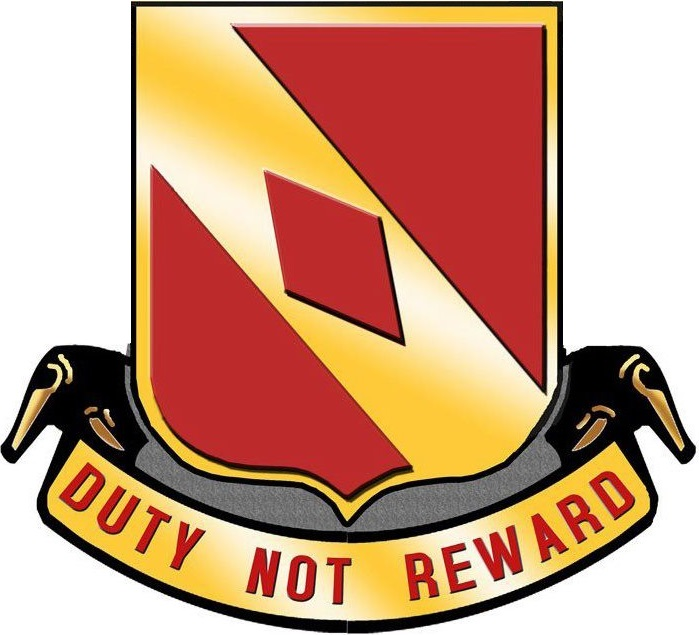
- Distinctive unit insignia: 20th FA

The 20th Field Artillery Regiment is a field artillery regiment of the United States Army constituted 1 July 1916 in the Regular Army. It served in France during the First World War with the 5th Division, at St. Mihiel and Lorraine before inactivation on 5 September 1921 at Camp Bragg, North Carolina.

The regiment's distinctive unit insignia was originally approved for the 20th Field Artillery on March 28, 1933. It was redesignated as 20th Field Artillery Battalion on August 12, 1948; redesignated as 20th Artillery on June 13, 1958; and redesignated for the 20th Field Artillery on September 1, 1971.

In 1966-67, the 6th Battalion (155 mm) was stationed at Fort Carson CO under the 5th Mechanized Infantry Division. During the Vietnam War, it had the mission to train and maintain Basic Combat Training and Field Artillery Advanced Individual Training. The 6th Battalion was awarded the Belgium Fourrager for its actions in WWII.

Currently, the regiment has only a single battalion on active service; the 2nd Battalion.

== 2nd Battalion ==
The 2nd Battalion, nicknamed "Deep Strike", is currently assigned to 75th Field Artillery Brigade, Fort Sill, Oklahoma, and equipped with the M270 Multiple Launch Rocket System. In the event of a contingency, the Texas Army National Guard's 2nd Battalion, 131st Field Artillery Regiment and Delta Battery, 2/20th Field Artillery would round it out.

The regiment and the battalion was reactivated in June 1940 at Fort Benning, Georgia, as an element of the 4th Division, later re-designated as the 4th Infantry Division. During World War II, the unit participated in the Normandy Campaign, and subsequent campaigns in Northern France, the Rhineland, Ardennes-Alsace and Central Europe. In 1957 the 2nd Battalion was assigned to the 1st Cavalry Division and activated in Korea. In 1960 the battalion was re-designated the 2nd Rocket Howitzer Battalion, 20th Field Artillery until taking its present moniker of 2nd Battalion, 20th Field Artillery in a 1971 redesignation.

During the Vietnam War the 2/20th was an aerial rocket artillery battalion, equipped with UH-1 B and C model and Bell AH-1 Cobra (G model) helicopters. It was known as "Blue Max." In 1972, the battalion was relieved from assignment to the 1st Cavalry Division, assigned to the 4th Infantry Division, and activated at Fort Carson, Colorado.

In 1976 the battalion was attached to the 8th Infantry Division in Wiesbaden, Germany, where it would remain until it was inactivated in 1984, subsequently reactivated in 1987 and again inactivated in 1992. In September 1998, 9–1 Field Artillery was reflagged as the 2nd Battalion, 20th Field Artillery Battalion. In 2001 the battalion supported the Army’s testing and fielding of the M270A1 launcher and became the first M270A1 MLRS unit in the Army. Soldiers with the 2nd Battalion, 20th Field Artillery Regiment, held a launching ceremony 17 April to present the new MLRS to the 4th Infantry Division. The ceremony consisted of a live-fire exercise attended by key members of the 4th Infantry Division and the 49th Armored Division, Texas Army National Guard.

=== Iraq War deployment ===
In March 2003 the battalion took part in the 2003 invasion of Iraq, where they performed not only their traditional field artillery tasks, including firing the Division’s first deep missile fires in combat, but performed armed reconnaissance missions, joint security patrols, cordon and searches, raids, and a wide variety of civil military operations. The battalion redeployed in March 2004.

Upon returning to Fort Hood the unit underwent training equipment maintenance until it was once again called into action in support of Operation Iraqi Freedom in December 2005. Upon return from deployment in December 2006 it was increased in size by the addition of a 3rd Firing Battery (Charlie), and adding a radar unit (A/26 FA). In addition, a previous support company, the 67th FSC, which had only been temporarily (ad hoc) attached at the beginning of the deployment was made a permanent part of the battalion. The addition of the 67th FSC thus increased the potency of the battalion.

The unit deployed in OIF 07-08 to Taji to conduct MLRS fires.

The unit deployed again in OIF 08-09 in Wasit Province, Iraq conducting counterinsurgency operations. The battalion served as the last unit on a 15-month deployed cycle.
