= Walter Joseph Marm Jr. =

American military officer

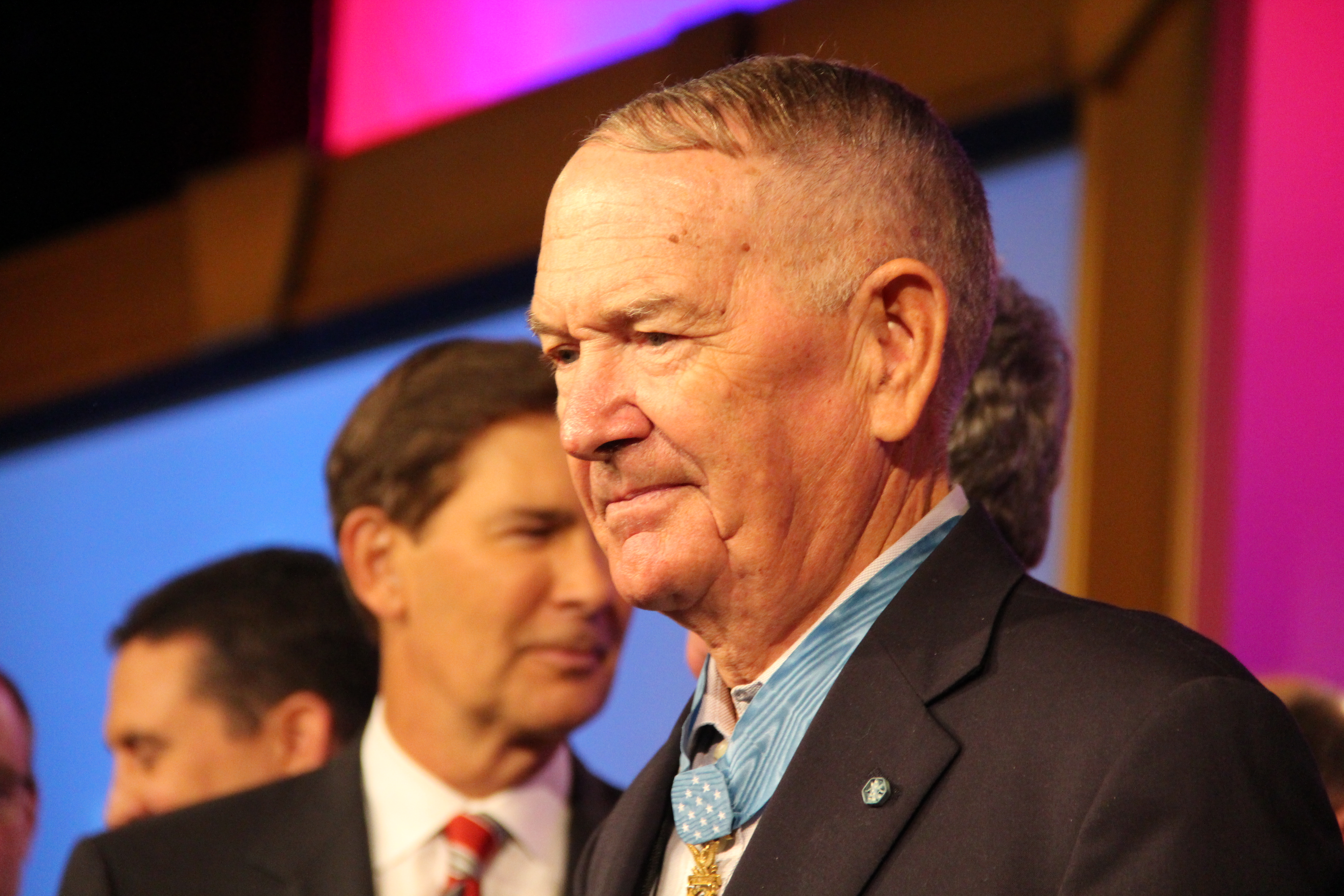
- Walter Marm in 2014
- Born: November 20, 1941 (age 84); Washington, Pennsylvania
- Military career
- Allegiance: United States
- Branch: United States Army
- Service years: 1965–1995
- Rank: Colonel
- Nickname: Joe
- Units: A Company, 1st Battalion, 7th Cavalry
- Conflicts: Vietnam War: Battle of Ia Drang
- Awards: Medal of Honor; Purple Heart

Walter Joseph "Joe" Marm Jr. (born November 20, 1941) is a retired United States Army colonel and a recipient of the United States military's highest decoration for valor, the Medal of Honor, for his actions in the Vietnam War.

== Early life ==
Marm was born in Washington, Pennsylvania, to Walter and Dorothy Marm, a Pennsylvania State police officer and retail clerk, respectively. He graduated from Duquesne University with a business degree in 1964. He then joined the United States Army from Pittsburgh, Pennsylvania, graduated from Officers Candidate School, and Ranger School.

== Military career ==
By September 1965, Marm was serving in the Republic of Vietnam (South Vietnam). On November 14, he was a second lieutenant and platoon leader of 2nd Platoon, A Company, 1st Battalion, 7th Cavalry Regiment, 1st Cavalry Division (Airmobile). On that day, during the Battle of Ia Drang, he single-handedly destroyed an enemy machine-gun position and several of its defenders, suffering severe wounds in the process. Marm survived his wounds and was subsequently promoted to first lieutenant; on December 19, 1966, he was awarded the Medal of Honor for his actions.

Marm reached the rank of colonel before retiring from the army in 1995. Marm is an Eagle Scout. As such, he is one of only eleven known Eagle Scouts who also received the Medal of Honor. Member of the Knights of Columbus 1966.

== Medal of Honor citation ==
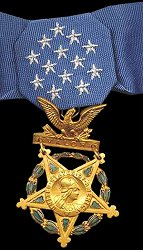
Medal of Honor

First Lieutenant Marm's official Medal of Honor citation reads:

For conspicuous gallantry and intrepidity at the risk of life above and beyond the call of duty. As a platoon leader in the 1st Cavalry Division (Airmobile), 1st Lt. Marm demonstrated indomitable courage during a combat operation. His company was moving through the valley to relieve a friendly unit surrounded by an enemy force of estimated regimental size. 1st Lt. Marm led his platoon through withering fire until they were finally forced to take cover. Realizing that his platoon could not hold very long, and seeing four enemy soldiers moving into his position, he moved quickly under heavy fire and annihilated all 4. Then, seeing that his platoon was receiving intense fire from a concealed machine gun, he deliberately exposed himself to draw its fire. Thus locating its position, he attempted to destroy it with an antitank weapon. Although he inflicted casualties, the weapon did not silence the enemy fire. Quickly, disregarding the intense fire directed on him and his platoon, he charged 30 meters across open ground, and hurled grenades into the enemy position, killing some of the 8 insurgents manning it. Although severely wounded, when his grenades were expended, armed with only a rifle, he continued the momentum of his assault on the position and killed the remainder of the enemy. 1st Lt. Marm's selfless actions reduced the fire on his platoon, broke the enemy assault, and rallied his unit to continue toward the accomplishment of this mission. 1st Lt. Marm's gallantry on the battlefield and his extraordinary intrepidity at the risk of his life are in the highest traditions of the U.S. Army and reflect great credit upon himself and the Armed Forces of his country.

== Political endorsement ==
Marm, a conservative Republican, endorsed Donald Trump for president in 2016. Marm traveled with Trump to election rallies and appeared on stage with him at numerous locations including Selma, North Carolina, on November 3, 2016. During Trump's remarks at Fort Bragg on June 10, 2025, he mentioned Marm's heroism at Ia Drang. Marm was in the audience.

== See also ==
- List of Medal of Honor recipients for the Vietnam War
