= Aerial rocket artillery =

2nd Bn, 20th Artillery
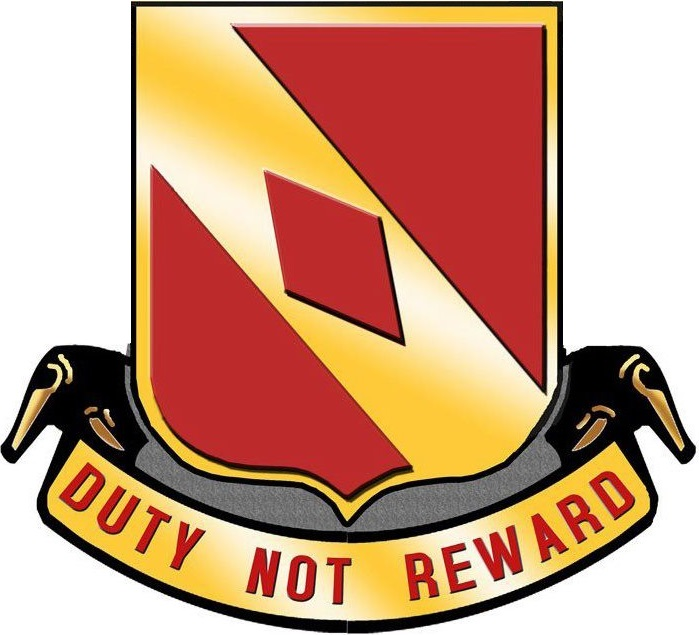
- 20th Artillery distinctive unit insignia
- Active: 1965–1972
- Country: United States
- Allegiance: USA
- Branch: Army
- Type: Aerial artillery
- Role: General support artillery
- Part of: 1st Cavalry Division
- Nickname: Blue Max
- Motto: "Duty not Reward"

4th Bn, 77th Artillery
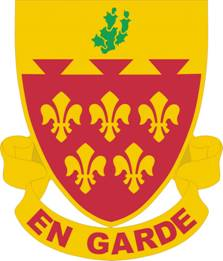
- 77th Artillery distinctive unit insignia
- Active: 1969–1972
- Country: United States
- Allegiance: United States of America
- Branch: Army
- Type: Aerial artillery
- Role: General support artillery
- Part of: 101st Airborne Division
- Motto: "En Garde"

Battery F, 79th Artillery
- Distinctive unit insignia
- Active: 1972
- Country: United States
- Branch: Army
- Type: Aerial artillery
- Role: General support artillery
- Part of: 3d Brigade, 1st Cavalry Division
- Motto: "Our Country – Our Regiment"

Aerial rocket artillery (abbreviated ARA, also called aerial artillery) is a type of armed helicopter unit that was part of the artillery component of the United States Army's two airmobile divisions during the Vietnam War. Controlled by division artillery and not the aviation group, the 2nd Battalion, 20th Artillery, 1st Cavalry Division and the 4th Battalion, 77th Artillery, 101st Airborne Division, along with Battery F, 79th Artillery, 1st Cavalry Division, were the only ARA units fielded during that conflict. The ARA concept disappeared from Army aviation by the mid-1970s, replaced by more generic attack aviation units.

== History ==
After the helicopter demonstrated its early battlefield capabilities in the Korean War, the United States Army began experimenting with expanded roles and missions for them. This culminated in 1962 with the formation of the Tactical Mobility Requirements Board, which strongly recommended the adaptation of helicopters in a variety of roles and missions. In 1963, the 11th Air Assault Division was activated to test a number of the Board's concepts and recommendations about air mobility. Because the 155mm howitzers then assigned to Army divisions as medium support artillery were not transportable by helicopters, the concept of aerial rocket artillery (ARA) was developed as a substitute. The original test unit for rocket-armed helicopters within the 11th Air Assault Division was the 2nd Battalion, 42nd Artillery (later designated the 3rd Battalion, 377th Artillery). When the 11th Air Assault was redesignated as the 1st Cavalry Division and sent to Vietnam, the 3/377th became the 2nd Battalion, 20th Artillery (using the radio call sign "Blue Max"). This was the first unit designated and organized as ARA to take part in combat operations. The 4/77th Artillery joined the 101st Airborne Division in 1969 when the 101st was converted to an airmobile division, becoming the second active ARA battalion. Battery F, 79th Artillery, was formed to serve with the separate 3d Brigade of the 1st Cavalry Division when the rest of the division was withdrawn from Vietnam. It was the final ARA unit to see combat service.

== Organization and equipment ==
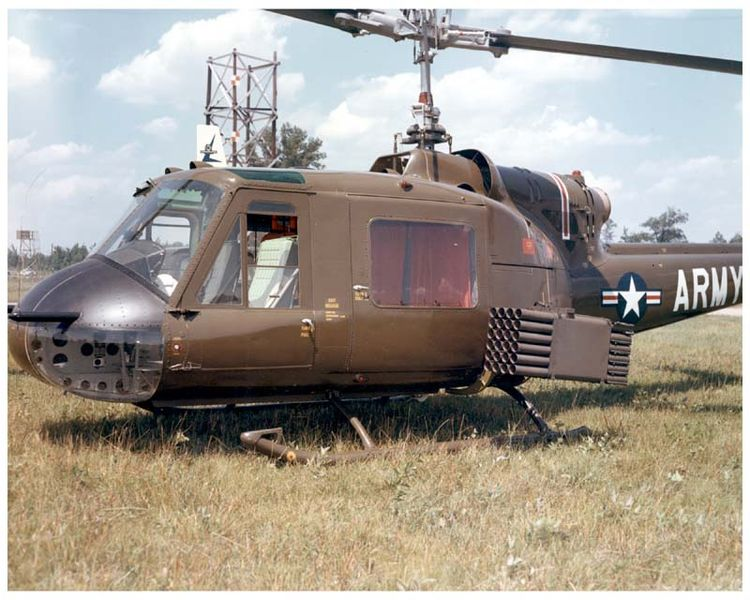
An early UH-1B in an ARA configuration without door guns.

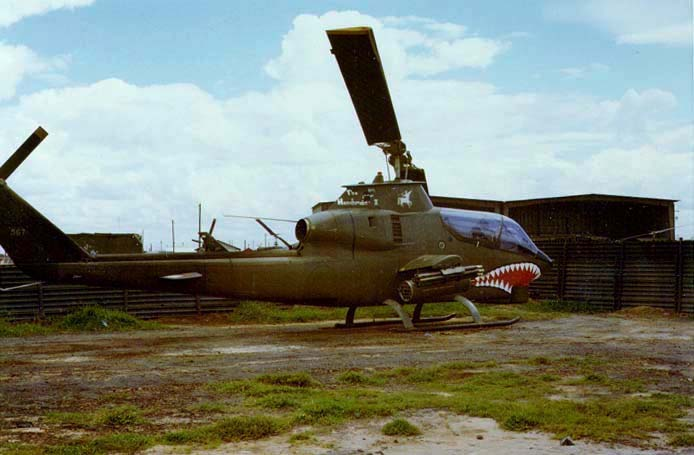
An AH-1G assigned to 3/4 Cavalry. It is in gunship, not ARA, configuration.

While there are current U.S. Army aviation units with an attack mission (such as the combat aviation brigade), ARA was unique because it was controlled by division artillery and not the aviation group (or an aviation brigade to use 2012 U.S. Army terminology). This allowed the artillery commander (usually a colonel) to coordinate ARA activities with other fire support missions (howitzers, air strikes, and so on). ARA was not the only location for attack helicopters within the Vietnam-era airmobile division (both the cavalry squadrons and standard lift battalions had attack aviation as part of their organization; with 12 gunships in Company D of each lift battalion and attack helicopters in each air cavalry troop), but it was the most concentrated and centralized element of attack aviation.

Each ARA battalion consisted of one H&HB (Headquarters & Headquarters Battery) and three firing batteries (Alpha, Bravo and Charlie). A firing battery was equipped with 12 attack helicopters. Initially the units were supplied with Bell UH-1B and UH-1C model helicopters, but these were replaced with the newer AH-1G Huey Cobra as they became available. According to one historian's authoritative account of the First Cavalry Division's actions in Vietnam, the conversion to Cobras gave the 2/20th ARA "the firepower equivalent to three conventional artillery batteries."

The primary weapon of the ARA units was the 2.75" Folding Fin Aerial Rocket (FFAR). While the B and C model UH-1s could carry up to 48 of these rockets in two racks of 24 each (XM-3 subsystem), the faster, more powerful Cobras could carry 76. In addition to the rockets, the UH-1s carried two M60 machine guns mounted in the cargo doors as defensive weapons operated by the aircraft's crew chief and a door gunner, while the Cobras were armed with a 7.62mm minigun and a 40 mm grenade launcher in a nose turret. Some UH-1s were also armed with the AGM-22/SS-11 wire guided missile.

== Missions ==
An ARA battery could perform any type of fire support mission conducted by conventional artillery, but with a much greater range (limited only by a helicopter's combat radius) than tube artillery. These missions included support of ground troops, landing zone (LZ) preparatory fire, interdiction, and counter-battery fire. In addition to normal artillery missions, the helicopters were also employed as escorts for medevac and re-supply helicopters. They also were teamed with light observation helicopters to perform tactical reconnaissance, although this mission was more commonly performed by the airmobile division's air cavalry squadron.

Like all aircraft, ARA units had difficulty conducting missions during bad weather or at night (although this was less of a consideration for the more advanced AH-1G). Tube artillery could fire in any conditions (bad weather, day, or night), and the 1st Cavalry Division ended up having a 155 mm howitzer battery (1st Battalion, 30th Artillery) attached to the division in Vietnam to provide medium artillery support in situations when ARA might not be able to fly. The 1st Cavalry Division locally designed and produced slings, allowing the 155 mm guns to be moved by their heavy CH-54 "Flying Crane" helicopters. When the 101st Airborne Division converted to an airmobile unit, the 2nd Battalion, 11th Artillery (155 mm) was similarly attached.

== Notable achievements ==
ARA participated in both the first and last major battles in Vietnam for US ground troops. UH-1B gunships from the 2/20th provided critical fire support during the Pleiku campaign in late 1965. The unit received a Presidential Unit Citation for demonstrating the validity of the ARA concept in combat. The 2/20th would also later be awarded the Valorous Unit Award in 1967. In 1971 the 4/77th provided fire support for ARVN units involved in the invasion of Laos (Operation Lam Son 719).

At the battle of An Loc, on April 13, 1972, an AH-1G from Battery F, 79th Artillery became the first helicopter in history to engage and destroy an enemy tank, reinforcing the helicopter's place on the modern battlefield.

Perhaps the greatest lasting accomplishment of ARA was to fully validate the concept of armed helicopters. Evolving from test units, ARA gunships (along with those assigned to lift companies and air cavalry troops) provided a source of supporting fire in Vietnam known for its "flexibility, accuracy, and immediate response" to any combat situation within range. The AH-1G Cobra was a direct result of the successes of the early armed UH-1Bs and UH-1Cs and remained in service well after the last ARA battery was decommissioned.

== Further development ==
In 1970 the designation ARA was changed to AFA (Aerial Field Artillery). As the Army began reorganizing for new missions, many Vietnam-era units and missions changed shape. The 1st Cavalry Division became a test division for the TRICAP concept (a division that could perform armor, airmobile, and air cavalry missions simultaneously), and later reorganized as an armored division. The 101st Airborne Division retained an airmobile (later air assault) role, but during the various reorganizations of the 1970s its AFA/ARA battalion disappeared. With attack aviation folded into the various aviation groups and brigades, ARA ceased to be a core artillery mission.
