= Robert McDade =

United States Army colonel (1922–2009)

- Lieutenant Colonel Robert McDade
- Born: August 11, 1922; New York City, New York, U.S.
- Died: October 14, 2009 (aged 87); Sag Harbor, New York, U.S.
- Burial place: Oakland Cemetery, Sag Harbor, New York
- Relatives: Elinor Van Ingen (m. 1974)
- Military career
- Allegiance: United States
- Branch: United States Army
- Service years: 1942–1975
- Rank: Colonel
- Commands: 2nd Battalion, 7th Cavalry Regiment
- Conflicts: World War II; Korean War; Vietnam War: Battle of Ia Drang
- Awards: Silver Star (2); Legion of Merit; Bronze Star Medal (3) with "V" Device; Purple Heart (4)

Robert Alexander McDade (August 11, 1922 – October 14, 2009) was a United States Army colonel. He is best known for commanding the 2nd Battalion, 7th Cavalry Regiment during the Battle of la Drang in 1965, during the Vietnam War.

== Military career ==
McDade was one of relatively few officers to serve with an infantry unit in three wars – the South Pacific in World War II, where he commanded a rifle platoon, the Korean War, where he commanded a rifle company, and the Vietnam War, where he commanded an infantry battalion. He was wounded in action four times. Besides his combat assignments, McDade held military posts in Washington, D.C., New York City, Germany and Panama.

=== Battle of Ia Drang ===
The Battle of la Drang was the first major battle between the United States Army and the People's Army of Vietnam, referred to by U.S. fighting units as the North Vietnamese Army (NVA), during the Vietnam War. The two-part battle began on November 14, 1965, and was focused on landing zone (LZ) X-Ray. This part of the battle was fought primarily by the 1st Battalion, 7th Cavalry Regiment, 1st Cavalry Division (Airmobile), led by Lieutenant Colonel Hal Moore, although elements of Alpha and Bravo Companies of the 2nd Battalion, 7th Cavalry (2/7), participated. The rest of the 2/7 arrived by the morning of November 16.

Only three weeks before the battle, Lieutenant Colonel McDade had been the 1st Cavalry Division's personnel officer, and had not commanded troops in ten years. His orders were to march the 2/7 to another landing zone, LZ Albany, 4 kilometers to the north-northeast. On the march, through high grass and thick vegetation, McDade declined an offer of artillery assistance from the 2nd Battalion, 5th Cavalry Regiment, and allowed the middle ranks of soldiers to march single file with little regard for security. On breaks, exhausted soldiers sprawled on the grass.

At midday, two NVA soldiers were captured. McDade moved forward to interrogate the prisoners himself, and called his company commanders forward for a conference. Most were accompanied by their radio operators. The American column was halted in unprepared, open terrain, and strung out in 550-yard (500 m) line of march. Meanwhile, NVA troops were organizing an assault.

The NVA opened fire, and Charlie Company took the worst of it, losing 20 killed and many more wounded in the first minute. The lead unit, Alpha Company, lost two platoons, 50 men, in the first minutes. The North Vietnamese were in among the Americans and up in the trees, so American artillery fire killed men from both sides. The commander of the 1st Cavalry Division, Lieutenant General Harry W.O. Kinnard and his second-in-command, Brigadier General Richard Knowles, later said the brigade commander, Colonel Brown, had not alerted them. Brown said he could get no coherent report from McDade. "We had ample resources at hand to reinforce Albany–Hal Moore's men would have gone in a minute–but no one asked," said Kinnard.

Reinforcements arrived in the late afternoon and evening, and wounded were evacuated late in the evening, and the battle was over. The casualty toll for the 2nd Battalion, 7th Cavalry, was 155 killed, 125 wounded and at least four men missing in action. The battle lasted 16 hours. McDade would continue to lead the 2nd Battalion until March 1966.

== Family ==
McDade met his wife, Elinor Tibbets Van Ingen (December 14, 1922 – April 11, 2012), in Saigon, where she was working for the State Department. They married in 1974. The McDades owned and managed The Goat Alley Gallery in Sag Harbor for twenty three years.

== Military awards ==
McDade's decorations and awards include:

Badge	Combat Infantryman Badge with 2 Stars (denoting 3rd award)			
1st Row	Silver Star w/ Oak Leaf Cluster	Legion of Merit	Bronze Star w/ two Oak Leaf Clusters and "V" Device	Air Medal
2nd Row	Army Commendation Medal with Oak Leaf Cluster	Purple Heart w/ three Oak Leaf Clusters	American Campaign Medal	Asiatic Pacific Campaign Medal w/ two 3/16" bronze stars
3rd Row	World War II Victory Medal	National Defense Service Medal w/ 3/16" bronze star	Korean Service Medal w/ three 3/16" bronze stars	Vietnam Service Medal w/ two 3/16" bronze stars
4th Row	Armed Forces Reserve Medal	Republic of Vietnam Gallantry Cross with Palm	United Nations Korea Medal	Republic of Vietnam Campaign Medal w/ 1960- device
