= Harry Kinnard =

United States Army general (1915–2009)

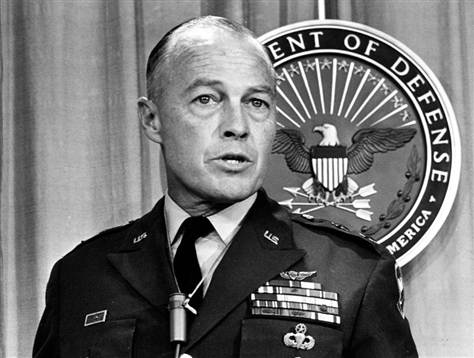
- Born: May 7, 1915; Dallas, Texas
- Died: January 5, 2009 (aged 93); Arlington County, Virginia
- Burial place: Arlington National Cemetery
- Military career
- Allegiance: United States
- Branch: United States Army
- Service years: 1939–1969
- Rank: Lieutenant General
- Service number: 0-21990
- Commands: 1st Cavalry Division; 1st Battalion, 501st Parachute Infantry Regiment
- Conflicts: World War II; Pearl Harbor; Battle of Normandy; Operation Market Garden; Battle of the Bulge; Vietnam War; Battle of Ia Drang; Battle of Bong Son
- Awards: Distinguished Service Cross; Army Distinguished Service Medal (2); Silver Star; Legion of Merit (2); Bronze Star Medal; Purple Heart; Knight 4th Class of the Military Order of William (Netherlands)

Harry William Osborne Kinnard II (May 7, 1915 – January 5, 2009) was a senior United States Army officer who, during the Vietnam War, pioneered the airmobile concept of sending troops into battle using helicopters. Kinnard retired from the military as a lieutenant general.

== Military career ==
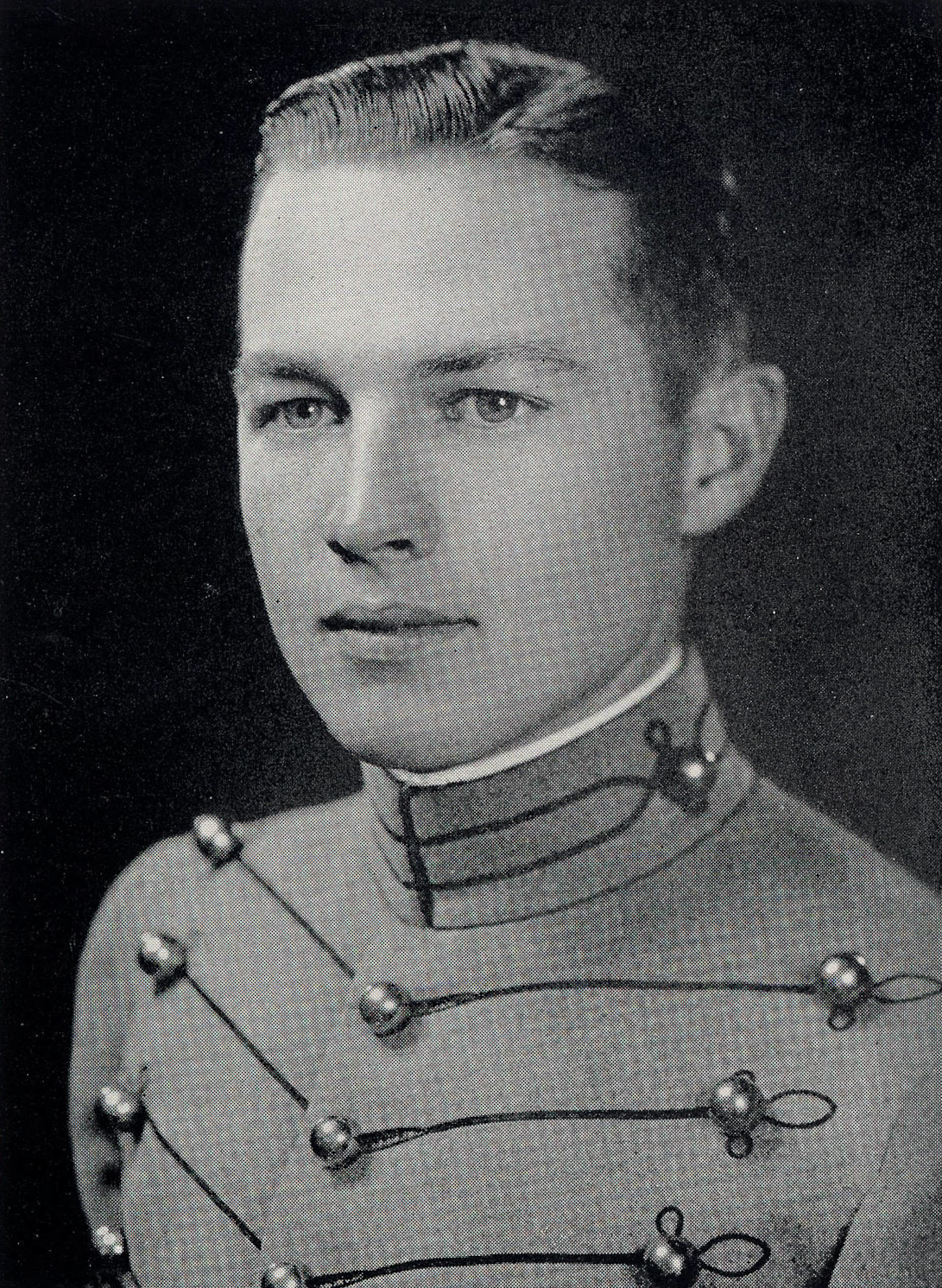
Kinnard as a West Point cadet in 1939

Kinnard grew up in Dallas, Texas. After graduating from the United States Military Academy at West Point in 1939, he entered military service.

=== World War II ===
On December 7, 1941, Kinnard was stationed at Pearl Harbor, and manned a machine gun to defend the base on the morning of the Japanese attack. He parachuted into France in the early hours of the Normandy Landings in June 1944, and was awarded the Distinguished Service Cross for his heroism during Operation Market Garden, as part of the Allied airborne attack against German forces in the Netherlands in September 1944.

==== Bastogne ====
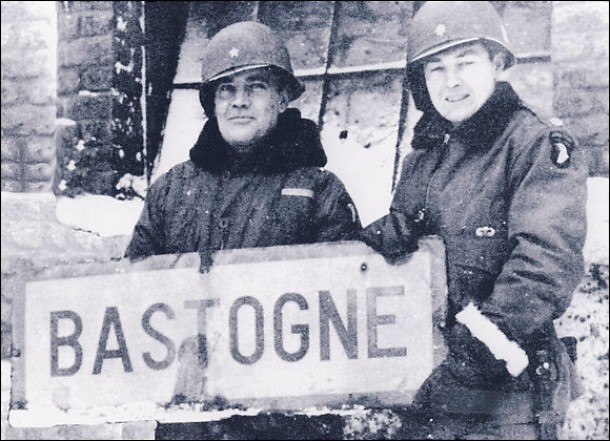
Acting commander of the 101st Airborne Division, Brigadier General Anthony McAuliffe, and Lieutenant Colonel Harry Kinnard, commanding officer of the 1st Battalion, 501st Parachute Infantry, at Bastogne after successfully defending the city.

In December 1944, during the Battle of the Bulge, German forces surrounded the town of Bastogne, a town in Belgium then held by the U.S. 101st Airborne Division and located at a crossroads that could have allowed the Germans to break through the American lines and reach their goal of retaking the port city of Antwerp. With the American forces surrounded, short on supplies and suffering the effects of the bitter cold weather, two German officers approached the American lines with a demand that the U.S. forces surrender or face destruction.

Brigadier general Anthony McAuliffe was acting division commander when he was handed the German demand. Lieutenant Colonel Kinnard, the division's operations officer, recounted later that McAuliffe had laughed and said "Us surrender? Aw, nuts." After considering the German demand, McAuliffe said he did not know what to say in response, to which Kinnard replied, "That first remark of yours would be hard to beat." As recounted by The New York Times in his 2009 obituary, "McAuliffe said, 'What do you mean?' I answered, 'Sir, you said, 'Nuts.' All members of the staff enthusiastically agreed. McAuliffe then wrote down: 'To the German Commander, Nuts! The American Commander.'"

McAuliffe's response was passed on to the two German officers who did not understand its meaning. Colonel Joseph H. Harper, commanding the 327th Glider Infantry Regiment, who had delivered the message, explained to the Germans, "If you don’t know what 'nuts' means, in plain English it is the same as 'go to hell.'"

McAuliffe asked Kinnard to compose a message that he delivered to the troops in Bastogne on Christmas Day, 1944. The message has been variously recorded as:

What's merry about all this, you ask? Just this: We have stopped cold everything that has been thrown at us from the North, East, South and West. We have identifications from four German Panzer divisions and one German parachute division. The Germans surround us, their radios blare our doom. Their commander demanded our surrender, and received the following reply... 'NUTS!' We are giving our country and our loved ones at home a worthy Christmas present, and, being privileged to take part in this gallant feat of arms, are truly making for ourselves a Merry Christmas.

With improving weather allowing air support to assist the troops, the American forces were able to hold Bastogne. "Nuts" came to symbolize the American determination to overcome against the odds.

After the war, William Wellman's film Battleground, based on the experiences of the 101st, was filmed and released in 1950. The script was written by Robert Pirosh, a veteran of the battle, and Kinnard served as the Technical Advisor.

Twenty years after the Battle of the Bulge, Kinnard drew criticism from members of the 101st Airborne Division for his comments in a newspaper interview where he said, "We never felt we would be overrun. We were beating back everything they threw at us. We had the houses, and we were warm. They were outside the town, in the snow and cold". Many members of Easy Company of the 506th Parachute Infantry sent military historian Stephen Ambrose, the author of "Band of Brothers", the article containing the comments with their own opinion, the mildest comment by an E Company member being, "What battle was he in?".

=== Airmobile ===
After the war, Kinnard served as commanding officer of the Aviation Test Section at Fort Bragg. In 1963, in response to the Howze Board directive to test all aspects of airmobility as a unit of the Regular Army, he was selected to command the 11th Air Assault Division (Test) at Fort Benning. He and others developed an organizational structure and plans in less than four months for a division that would use helicopters to move one-third of its infantry battalions and supporting units in one single helicopter lift.

When the test was concluded, the assets of the 11th Air Assault Division (Test) and the 2nd Infantry Division were merged into a single unit. The colors and subordinate unit designations of the 1st Air Cavalry Division were transferred from its post in South Korea. On 3 July 1965, in Doughboy Stadium at Fort Benning, the colors of the 11th Air Assault Division (Test) were cased and retired and the 1st Air Cavalry Division colors were moved onto the field and passed to the commander of the former 11th Air Assault Division, Major General Kinnard. At the same time the personnel and units of the 1st Cavalry Division that remained in Korea were reflagged as a new 2nd Infantry Division.

=== Vietnam War ===
In July 1965 the 1st Air Cavalry Division was ordered to South Vietnam.

Kinnard commanded an operation in October 1965, in which 5,000 troops took control of the Suoi Ca Valley, Vietnam, which placed the crop-rich valley under South Vietnamese control. Associated Press reporter Bob Poos who rode for two days with 1st Squadron, 9th Cavalry Regiment of the 1st Air Cavalry Division during the operation, described the innovative use of the "Sky Cavalry", combining light infantry on armed helicopters, as constituting "the first cavalry charge of modern warfare".

Kinnard was ordered by COMUSMACV General William Westmoreland at the end of October 1965 to take the 1st Air Cavalry on the offensive and seize the initiative in Pleiku province. During this action, the division conducted 35 days of continuous airmobile operations. The opening Battle of Ia Drang resulted in heavy North Vietnamese casualties at the cost of 300 American deaths. It was described in the book We Were Soldiers Once… And Young, which was also the basis of the subsequent Mel Gibson film We Were Soldiers. The unit also earned the first Presidential Unit Citation presented to a division during the Vietnam War.

As a result of Kinnard's leadership, helicopters became an essential part of US military doctrine.

Kinnard retired from the army in 1969.

== Honors and awards ==

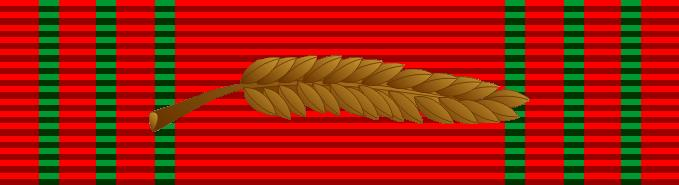

1st Row		Distinguished Service Cross		
2nd Row	Distinguished Service Medal with Oak Leaf Cluster	Silver Star	Legion of Merit with Oak Leaf Cluster	Bronze Star Medal
3rd Row	Air Medal	Army Commendation Medal	Purple Heart	American Defense Service Medal with one bronze star
4th Row	American Campaign Medal	Asiatic-Pacific Campaign Medal with one campaign star	European-African-Middle Eastern Campaign Medal with four campaign stars	World War II Victory Medal
5th Row	Army of Occupation Medal	National Defense Service Medal with one bronze star	Vietnam Service Medal with one campaign star	French Croix de Guerre 1939–1945 with Palm
6th Row	Belgian Croix de Guerre 1940–1945 with Palm	Belgian Order of the Crown – Officer Grade	Netherlands Military William Order – Knight Grade	Vietnam Gallantry Cross with Palm

On November 14, 1946, by Royal Decree, Kinnard was knighted by Queen Wilhelmina, with the rank of Knight 4th Class of the Military Order of William. The Order is the highest and oldest honour of the Kingdom of the Netherlands, which is bestowed for "performing excellent acts of Bravery, Leadership and Loyalty in battle".

== Kinnard in Museums ==
World War II memorabilia from Kinnard can be seen in Belgium where he fought during the Battle of the Bulge in December 1944, at December 44 Museum, La Gleize.

Kinnard Mission Training Center, a digital systems training complex at Fort Campbell, Kentucky is named for him. His awards, decorations and several historical items of interest relating to him are on display in its lobby.

== Personal ==
Kinnard died at age 93 on January 5, 2009, in Arlington, Virginia. He was survived by his wife, Libby; two sons, three daughters, a stepson, two stepdaughters, 16 grandchildren and 15 great-grandchildren.
