= Chư Prông district =

Coordinates: 13.500°N 107.750°E

Chư Prông district Huyện Chư Prông
- District
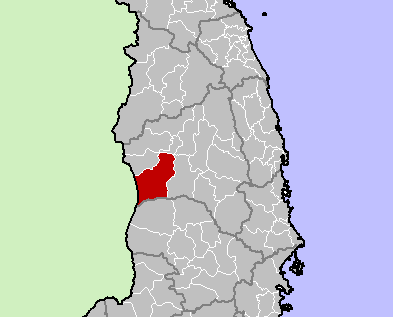
- Location in Gia Lai province
- Country: Vietnam
- Region: Central Highlands
- Province: Gia Lai province
- Capital: Chư Prông

Area
  - Total: 654.02 sq mi (1,693.91 km^{2})

Population (31/12/2024)
  - Total: 143,463
  - Density: 219.355/sq mi (84.6934/km^{2})
- Time zone: UTC+7 (Indochina Time)

Chư Prông is a district (huyện) of Gia Lai province in the Central Highlands region of Vietnam.

As of 2003 the district had a population of 76,255. The district covers an area of 1,688 km^{2}. The district capital lies at Chư Prông.
