= National Army =

The term national army typically means the lawful army of the state, as distinct from rebel armies or private armies that may operate there.

National Army may also refer to:

- National Revolutionary Army, the national army of the Republic of China in 1925–1947, known has the National Army after 1928
- Korean Liberation Army, the national army of the Republic of Korea in 1941–1946, known has the National Army after 1943
- National Army, the 1917 army of the United States of America
- National Army (Ireland) (1921–1924), the army of the Irish Free State in its formative years
- Suriname National Army, the name of the Surinamese military since 1980
- Nationalist faction (Spanish Civil War), (Spanish: Ejército Nacional), Nationalist rebel forces in the Spanish Civil War
- Syrian National Army, Syrian opposition group
- National Army of Colombia, the land military force of the government of Colombia and the largest service of the Colombian Armed Forces
- Armed Forces of Guatemala, (Spanish: Ejercito Nacional de Guatemala), a branch of the military of Guatemala
- National Army of Uruguay, (Spanish: Ejército Nacional), a branch of the military of Uruguay
- National Army of Venezuela, one of the four professional branches of the Armed Forces of Venezuela
- Libyan National Army, military forces of the Libyan House of Representatives

== See also ==
- National Liberation Army (disambiguation)
- National Salvation Army (disambiguation)
- Nationalist army (disambiguation)
- 國軍 (disambiguation)
