= 88th Readiness Division =

88th Division 88th Infantry Division 88th Army Reserve Command 88th Regional Support Command 88th Regional Readiness Command 88th Readiness Division
- 88th Infantry Division shoulder sleeve insignia.
- Active: 5 August 1917–10 June 1919 (National Army); 24 June 1921–24 October 1947 (Organized Reserve); 24 October 1947–26 October 1954 (TRUST); 26 December 1967–16 April 1996 (88th ARCOM); 16 April 1996–16 July 2003 (88th RSC); 16 July 2003–19 August 2017 (88th RRC); 19 August 2017–present (88th Readiness Div.)
- Country: United States of America
- Branch: United States Army Reserve
- Type: Readiness
- Size: Division
- Part of: United States Army Reserve Command
- Nicknames: "Fighting Blue Devils" "Clover Leaf Division"
- Mottos: 88th Readiness Div. - Veritas Caput (Latin: True Head); 88th Infantry Div. - Signa Fidelis (Latin: Faithful Signs)
- Engagements: World War I; Alsace 1918; World War II; Rome-Arno; North Apennines; Po Valley
- Decorations: French Croix de guerre with palm

Commanders
- Current commander: Maj. Gen. Joseph A. Ricciardi
- Command Sergeant Major: CSM Douglas D. Dieckman
- Notable commanders: Paul Wilkins Kendall

Insignia
- Distinctive Unit Insignia

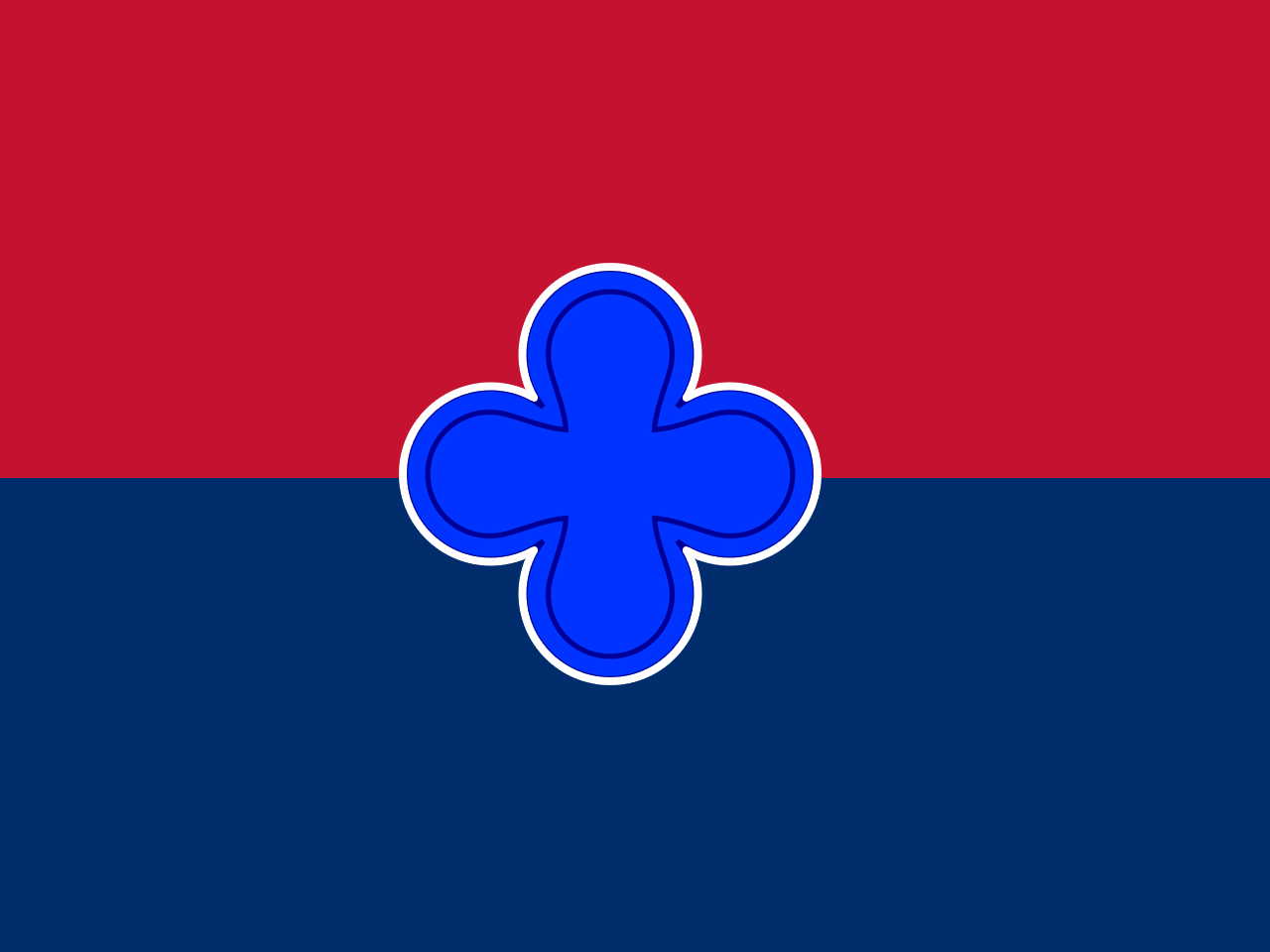
- Flag of the United States Army 88th Readiness Division

The 88th Readiness Division is an administrative formation of the United States Army Reserve. It traces its history to the 88th Infantry Division, a infantry division of the United States Army that saw service in both World War I and World War II. It was one of the first of the Organized Reserve divisions to be called into federal service, created nearly "from scratch" after the implementation of the draft in 1940. Previous divisions were composed of a core of either Regular Army or National Guard personnel plus draftees. Much of the experience in reactivating it was used in the subsequent expansion of the U.S. Army.

By the end of the Second World War the division fought its way to the northernmost extreme of Italy. In early May 1945 troops of its 349th Infantry Regiment joined the 103d Infantry Division of the VI Corps of the U.S. Seventh Army, which had raced south through Bavaria into Innsbruck, Austria, in Vipiteno in the Italian Alps.

== History ==
=== World War I ===
- Activated: 5 August 1917, Camp Dodge, Iowa
- Overseas: 7 September 1918
- Casualties: Total-78 (KIA-12; WIA-66)
- Commanders:
  - Maj. Gen. Edward H. Plummer (25 August 1917)
  - Brig. Gen. Robert N. Getty (27 November 1917)
  - Maj. Gen. Edward H. Plummer (19 February 1918)
  - Brig. Gen. Robert N. Getty (15 March 1918)
  - Brig. Gen. William D. Beach (24 May 1918)
  - Maj. Gen. William Weigel (10 September 1918)
- Inactivated: 10 June 1919, Camp Dodge, Iowa

Initial personnel for the division were Selective Service men from Illinois, Iowa, Minnesota, and North Dakota, and the division was at full strength of 20,000 by the end of September 1917. The 88th Division, like many National Army divisions, subsequently suffered heavily from transfers to other new units or units that were more advanced in their training and preparing to go overseas, delaying its combat readiness. In October 1917, 3,000 men were transferred to the 34th Division and 1,000 to the 33rd Division, while in November 8,000 went to the 87th Division. The strength of the 88th Division was only 8,000 men in January 1918, but the next month, 12,000 men arrived from Iowa and Minnesota to bring the division to full strength. Subsequently, 16,000 men were transferred from the division, the majority to the 82nd Division, and others to the 30th, 33rd, 35th and 90th Divisions. At the end of April, the 88th Division was left with less than 8,500 men, but during May and June more than 10,000 fresh drafts joined, many from Missouri, Nebraska, and South Dakota, and during July, more fresh drafts and transfers completed the division. The division sailed in stages to England in August and September 1918, and moved to France. Elements of the division participated in training near the front lines with the French Army, and occupied quiet sectors of the front in Alsace beginning in early October 1918. The Armistice of 11 November 1918 ended the war a month later.

==== Order of battle ====
The division was composed of the following units:

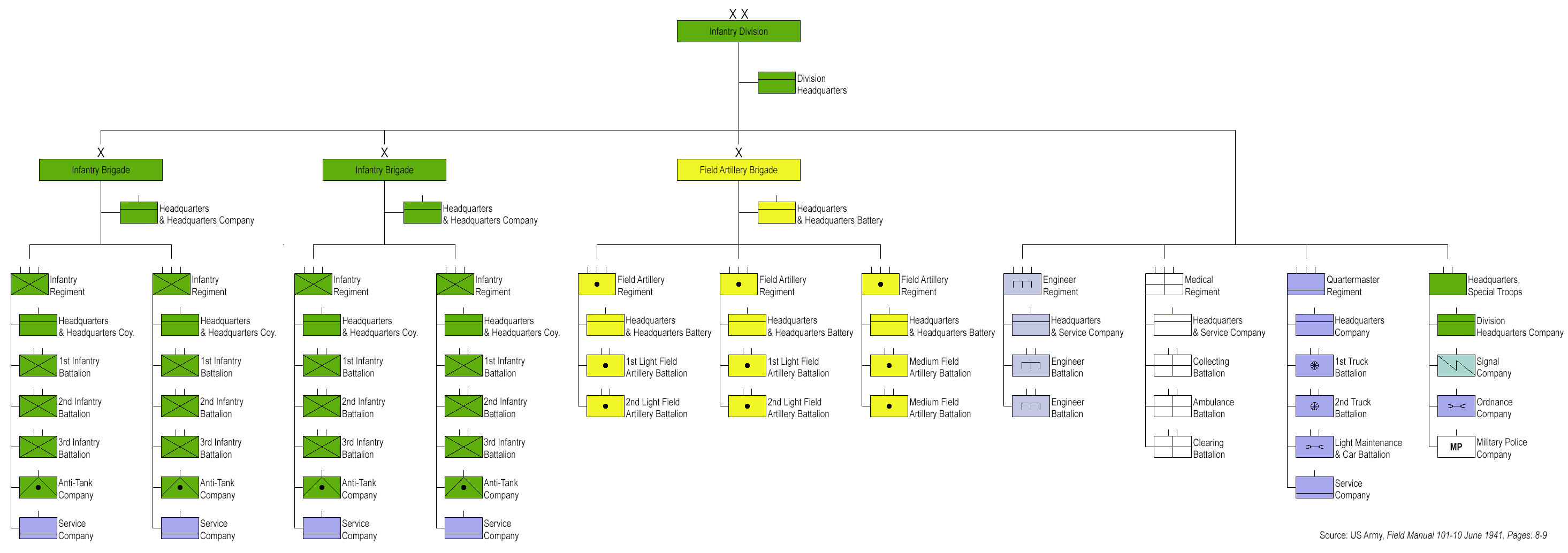
Square Division example: 1940 US Infantry Division. On the far left can be seen two Brigades of two Regiments each

- Headquarters, 88th Division
- 175th Infantry Brigade
  - 349th Infantry Regiment
  - 350th Infantry Regiment
  - 338th Machine Gun Battalion
- 176th Infantry Brigade
  - 351st Infantry Regiment
  - 352nd Infantry Regiment
  - 339th Machine Gun Battalion
- 163rd Field Artillery Brigade
  - 337th Field Artillery Regiment (75 mm)
  - 338th Field Artillery Regiment (75 mm)
  - 339th Field Artillery Regiment (155 mm)
  - 313th Trench Mortar Battery
- Headquarters Troop, 88th Division
- 337th Machine Gun Battalion
- 313th Engineer Regiment
- 313th Field Signal Battalion
- 313th Train Headquarters and Military Police
  - 313th Ammunition Train
  - 313th Supply Train
  - 313th Engineer Train
  - 313th Sanitary Train
    - 349th-352nd Ambulance Companies and Field Hospitals

=== Interwar period ===
The 88th Division headquarters arrived at the port of Newport News, Virginia, aboard the USS Pocahontas on 1 June 1919 and was demobilized on 10 June 1919 at Camp Dodge. Pursuant to the National Defense Act of 1920, the 88th Division was reconstituted in the Organized Reserve on 24 June 1921, allotted to the Seventh Corps Area, assigned to the XVII Corps, and further allotted to the states of Minnesota, Iowa, and North Dakota. The division headquarters was organized on 2 September 1921 at 1684 Van Buren Street in St. Paul, Minnesota. It was relocated to the Kasota Building in Minneapolis, Minnesota, on 29 September 1921, to 835 Palace Building in August 1924, and to the new Post Office Building in July 1937, where it remained until activated for World War II. In the first years after World War I, many officers of the division were chaplains, doctors, engineers, or other men with prior military service commissioned directly from civilian life. As the 1920s turned to the 1930s, many of the World War I veteran officers began to retire, and the single largest cohort of officers in the division became college graduates from the Reserve Officers Training Corps. The primary sources for these new Reserve lieutenants were Coe College, the State University of Iowa, and Iowa State College of Agriculture and Mechanic Arts in Iowa, the University of Minnesota in Minnesota, and North Dakota Agricultural College and the University of North Dakota in North Dakota.

The designated mobilization and training station for the division was Camp Dodge. For annual training the headquarters and staff usually trained with the staff of the 14th Infantry Brigade, either at Fort Crook, Nebraska, or Fort Snelling, Minnesota. The infantry regiments held their annual training primarily with the 3rd Infantry Regiment at Fort Snelling, or with the 17th Infantry Regiment at Fort Des Moines, Iowa. Other units, such as the special troops, artillery, engineers, aviation, medical, and quartermaster, trained at various posts in the Sixth and Seventh Corps Areas, often with the active units of the 7th Division or other Regular Army units. For example, the division artillery trained at Camp McCoy, Wisconsin; the 313th Engineer Regiment trained at Fort Riley, Kansas, with Troop A, 9th Engineer Squadron; the 313th Medical Regiment trained at the medical corps training camp at Fort Snelling; and the 313th Observation Squadron trained with the 16th Observation Squadron at Marshall Field, Kansas. The infantry regiments also rotated responsibility to conduct the Citizens Military Training Camps held at Fort Snelling, Fort Des Moines, and Fort Lincoln, North Dakota, each year. The division sometimes participated in Seventh Corps Area and Fourth Army command post exercises with other Regular Army, National Guard, and Organized Reserve units, but unlike the Regular and Guard units, the 88th Division did not participate in the Seventh Corps Area maneuvers and the Fourth Army maneuvers of 1937, 1940, and 1941 as an organized unit due to lack of enlisted personnel and equipment. Instead, the officers and a few enlisted reservists were assigned to Regular and Guard units to bring the units up to war strength for the exercises. Additionally, some were assigned duties as umpires or as support personnel. In the United States Army's precautionary mobilization in 1940-1941 prior to the Japanese attack on Pearl Harbor, most Organized Reserve officers were ordered to active duty individually and assigned to fill vacancies in existing or newly organized Regular Army and National Guard units. As a result, the 88th Division was almost completely depleted of personnel, particularly company-grade officers (lieutenants and captains).

=== World War II ===
- Ordered into active military service: 15 July 1942, Camp Gruber, Oklahoma
- Overseas: 6 December 1943
- Distinguished Unit Citations: 3
- Campaigns: Rome-Arno, North Apennines, Po Valley
- Days of combat: 344
- Awards: Medal of Honor-3; Distinguished Service Cross (United States)-40; Distinguished Service Medal (United States)-2; Silver Star-522; Legion of Merit-66; Soldier's Medal-19; Bronze Star Medal-3,784.
- Unit citations: Third Battalion, 351st Infantry Regiment (action vicinity Laiatico; 9–13 July 1944). Second Battalion, 350th Infantry Regiment (action on Mt. Battaglia, 27 Sept – 3 Oct 1944). Second Battalion, 351st Infantry Regiment (action vicinity Mt. Cappello, 27 Sept – 1 Oct 1944).
- Commanders:
  - Maj. Gen. John E. Sloan (July 1942 – September 1944)
  - Maj. Gen. Paul W. Kendall (September 1944 – July 1945)
  - Brig. Gen. James C. Fry (July–November 1945)
  - Maj. Gen. Bryant Moore (November 1945 to inactivation)
- Inactivated: 24 October 1947 in Italy

==== Mobilization ====
Before Organized Reserve infantry divisions were ordered into active military service, they were reorganized on paper as "triangular" divisions under the 1940 tables of organization. The headquarters companies of the two infantry brigades were consolidated into the division's cavalry reconnaissance troop, and one infantry regiment was removed by inactivation. The field artillery brigade headquarters and headquarters battery became the headquarters and headquarters battery of the division artillery. Its three field artillery regiments were reorganized into four battalions; one battalion was taken from each of the two 75 mm gun regiments to form two 105 mm howitzer battalions, the brigade's ammunition train was reorganized as the third 105 mm howitzer battalion, and the 155 mm howitzer battalion was formed from the 155 mm howitzer regiment. The engineer, medical, and quartermaster regiments were reorganized into battalions. In 1942, divisional quartermaster battalions were split into ordnance light maintenance companies and quartermaster companies, and the division's headquarters and military police company, which had previously been a combined unit, was split.

The 88th Infantry Division, commanded by Major General John E. Sloan, was ordered into active military service on 15 July 1942 at Camp Gruber, Oklahoma, around a cadre of officers and men from the 9th Infantry Division, National Guard and Organized Reserve officers, and men from infantry replacement training centers at Camp Wheeler, Georgia, and Camp Wolters, Texas. The first group of draftee fillers for the division arrived in early August, coming predominantly from New England and the Mid-Atlantic states. Other groups, mainly from the Great Lakes and Midwest but also hailing from the Southwest and Far West, arrived in October and early November to round out the division.

==== Division organization ====
The division consisted of the following units:

88th Infantry Division organization (click to enlarge)

- 88th Infantry Division
  - 88th Infantry Division Headquarters
  - 88th Cavalry Reconnaissance Troop (Mechanized) (M3 scout cars and then M8 Greyhound armored cars)
  - 349th Infantry Regiment
    - Headquarters and Headquarters Company
    - 3× Infantry battalions
      - each battalion consists of: 1× Headquarters and Headquarters Company, 3× Rifle companies, 1× Heavy Weapons Company
    - Cannon Company (T12 Gun Motor Carriages and T19 Howitzer Motor Carriages, later replaced by either M3 105mm towed howitzers or M7 Priest self propelled howitzers)
    - Anti-Tank Company (M3 37mm anti-tank guns, which were replaced by 1944 with M1 57mm anti-tank guns)
    - Service Company
  - 350th Infantry Regiment
    - same organization as 349th Infantry Regiment
  - 351st Infantry Regiment
    - same organization as 349th Infantry Regiment
  - 88th Infantry Division Artillery
    - Headquarters and Headquarters Battery
    - 337th Field Artillery Battalion
      - Headquarters and Headquarters Battery
      - 3× Batteries (M2 105mm towed howitzers)
      - Service Battery
    - 338th Field Artillery Battalion
      - same organization as 337th Field Artillery Battalion
    - 339th Field Artillery Battalion
      - Headquarters and Headquarters Battery
      - 3× Batteries (M1 155mm towed howitzers)
      - Service Battery
    - 913th Field Artillery Battalion
      - same organization as 337th Field Artillery Battalion
  - Headquarters Special 337th
    - Headquarters Company, 88th Infantry Division
    - 88th Signal Company
    - 88th Quartermaster Company
    - 788th Ordnance Light Maintenance Company
    - Military Police Platoon
    - 88th Infantry Division Band (attached)
  - 313th Engineer Combat Battalion
    - Headquarters and Headquarters and Service Company
    - 3× Engineer combat companies
  - 313th Medical Battalion
    - Headquarters and Headquarters Detachment
    - 3× Collecting companies
    - Clearing Company

The division was unique among U.S. Army infantry divisions during World War II in that it suffered relatively little from factors that caused personnel turbulence or other delays to the date on which it was judged to be "ready" for combat service and shipped to a theater of war. The Army's officer candidate schools (OCS) expanded dramatically in scope in 1942. One requirement for entry was that men have at least six months of service in the Army; the majority of the 88th Infantry Division's personnel did not become eligible for OCS until January 1943, around which time the Army reconsidered the troop basis, eliminating the need for many infantry officers as their future units were no longer contemplated for organization. OCS quotas in the combat arms were reduced dramatically until 1944. There was also little pressure for the division to provide candidates for the Army Specialized Training Program (ASTP), which went into operation early in 1943, as units on maneuvers or under alert orders were exempted from providing candidates. The 88th Infantry Division went on maneuvers in Louisiana beginning in June 1943 and was alerted for overseas movement in September, soon after completing them. The division also had not progressed far enough in its training to be a victim of the stripping of stateside units in 1942 to obtain men needed to fill out units slated for participation in the Allied landings in North Africa in November 1942. In addition, it moved overseas just as the stripping of stateside units to fill emergency requirements and provide additional sources of trained replacements became a formalized policy beginning in fall 1943, resulting in near-continuous personnel losses to many units until late summer 1944. According to the Army Ground Forces, the 88th's three sister divisions activated in July 1942, the 80th, 89th, and 95th, respectively lost seven, fourteen, and eight months of training time to personnel turbulence caused by withdrawal of ASTP/OCS candidates or time lost because of other factors not attributed to personnel turbulence.

==== Combat chronicle ====
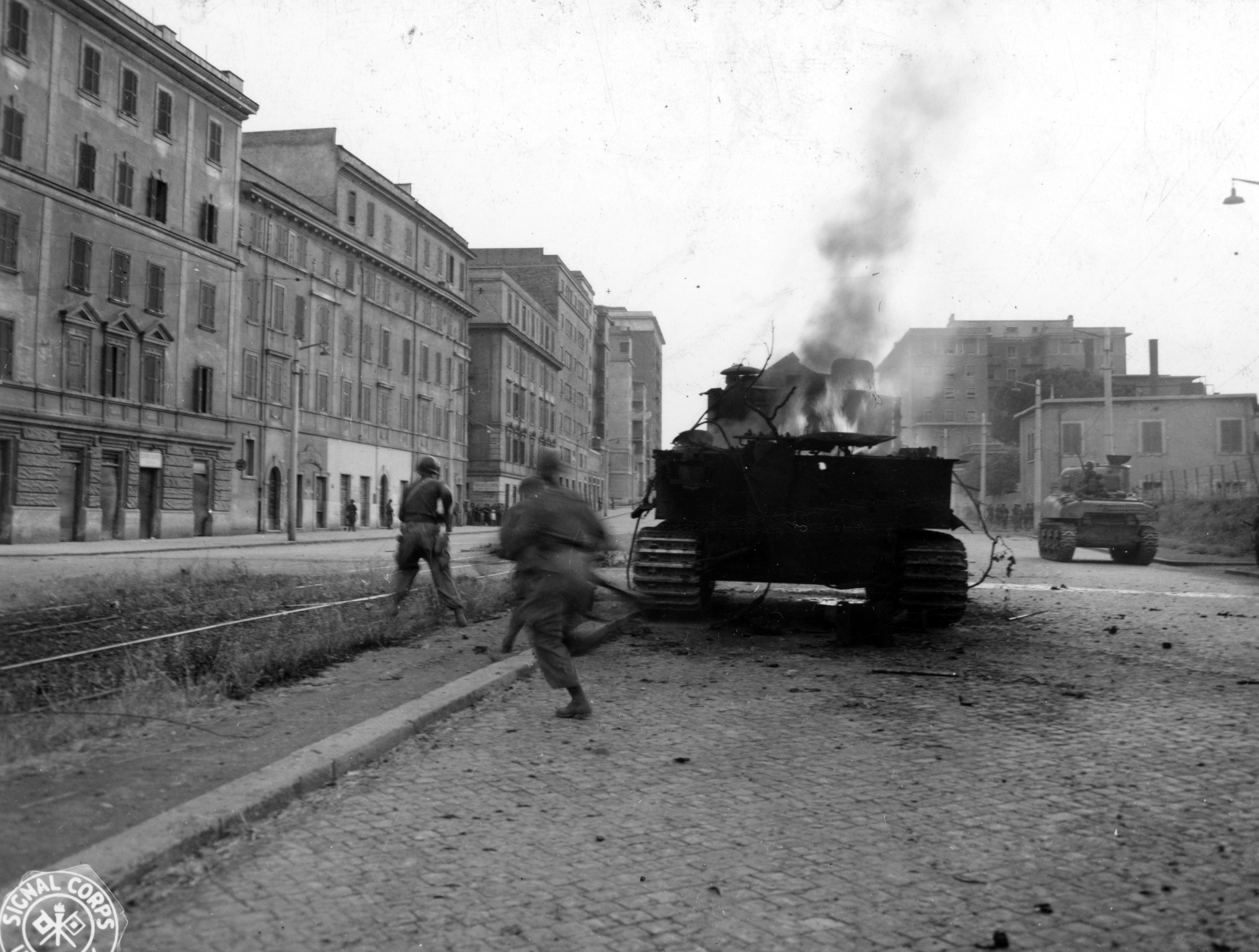
Soldiers of the 88th Infantry Division pass a burning German tank during the capture of Rome in June 1944

- First Entered combat: Advance party on night of 3–4 January 1944 in support of Monte Cassino attacks.
- First Organization Committed to Line: 2nd Battalion, 351st Infantry Regiment plus attachments
- First combat fatality: 3 January 1944
- Began post war POW Command: 7 June 1945. Responsible for guarding and later repatriating 324,462 German POWs.

The 88th Infantry Division arrived at Casablanca, French Morocco on 15 December 1943, and moved to Magenta, Algeria, on 28 December for intensive training. Destined to spend the war fighting on the Italian Front, the division arrived at Naples, Italy on 6 February 1944, and concentrated around Piedimonte d'Alife for combat training. The 88th Infantry Division, along with the 85th Infantry Division, were the first United States Army divisions composed essentially entirely of draftees to enter combat. An advance element went into the line before Monte Cassino on 27 February, and the entire division relieved the battered British 46th Infantry Division along the Garigliano River in the Minturno area on 5 March. A period of defensive patrols and training followed. The 88th formed part of Major General Geoffrey Keyes's II Corps, part of the U.S. Fifth Army, under Lieutenant General Mark W. Clark.

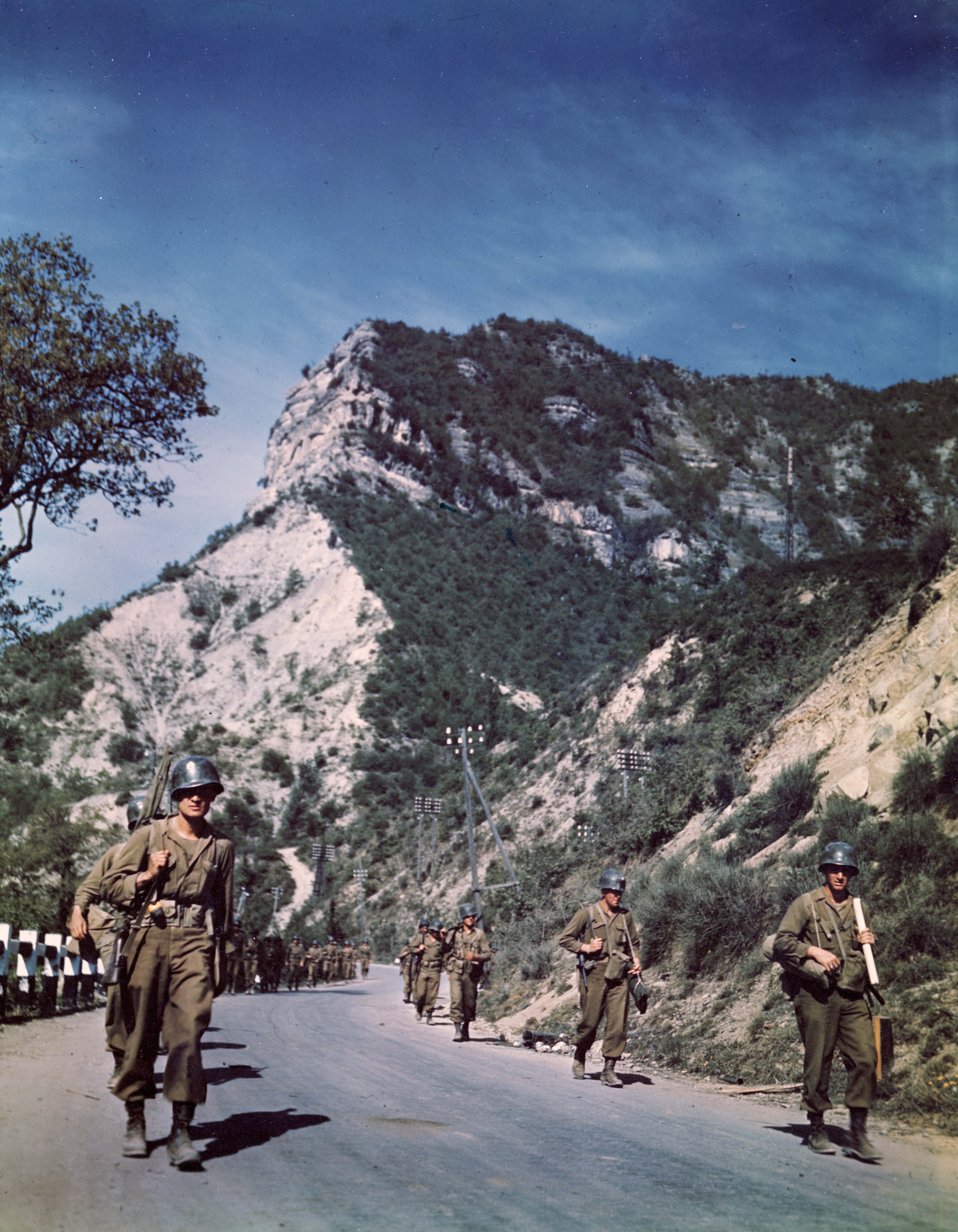
88th Division infantrymen near Bologna

After being inspected by the Fifth Army commander on 5 May, the 88th Division, six days later, drove north to take Spigno, Mount Civita, Itri, Fondi, and Roccagorga, reached Anzio, 29 May, and pursued the enemy into Rome, being the first unit of the Fifth Army into the city on 4 June, two days before the Normandy landings, after a stiff engagement on the outskirts of the city. An element of the 88th is credited with being first to enter the Eternal City. After continuing across the Tiber to Bassanelio the 88th retired for rest and training, 11 June. The division went into defensive positions near Pomerance on 5 July, and launched an attack toward Volterra on the 8th, taking the town the next day. Laiatico fell on the 11th, Villamagna on the 13th, and the Arno River was crossed on the 20th although the enemy resisted bitterly.

After a period of rest and training, the 88th Division, now commanded by Major General Paul Wilkins Kendall, opened its assault on the Gothic Line on 21 September, and advanced rapidly along the Firenzuola-Imola road, taking Monte Battaglia (Casola Valsenio, RA) in the Battle of Monte Battaglia on the 28th. The enemy counterattacked savagely and heavy fighting continued on the line toward the Po Valley. The strategic positions of Mount Grande and Farnetto were taken on 20 and 22 October. From 26 October 1944 to 12 January 1945, the 88th entered a period of defensive patrolling in the Mount Grande-Mount Cerrere sector and the Mount Fano area. From 24 January to 2 March 1945, the division defended the Loiano-Livergnano area and after a brief rest returned to the front. The drive to the Po Valley began on 15 April. Monterumici fell on the 17th after an intense artillery barrage and the Po River was crossed at Revere-Ostiglia on 24–25 April, as the 88th pursued the enemy toward the Alps. The cities of Verona and Vicenza were captured on the 25th and 28th and the Brenta River was crossed on 30 April. The 88th was driving through the Dolomite Alps toward Innsbruck, Austria where it linked up with the 103rd Infantry Division, part of the U.S. Seventh Army, when the hostilities ended on 2 May 1945.

"On 3 May the 85th and 88th [Infantry] Divisions sent task forces north over ice and snow 3 feet deep to seal the Austrian frontier and to gain contact with the American Seventh Army, driving southward from Germany. The 339th Infantry reached Austrian soil east of Dobbiaco at 0415, 4 May; the Reconnaissance Troop, 349th Infantry met troops from [103rd Infantry Division] VI Corps of Seventh Army at 1051 at Vipiteno, 9 miles south of Brenner."

The end of World War II in Europe came six days later. Throughout the war the 88th Infantry Division was in combat for 344 days.

==== Casualties ====
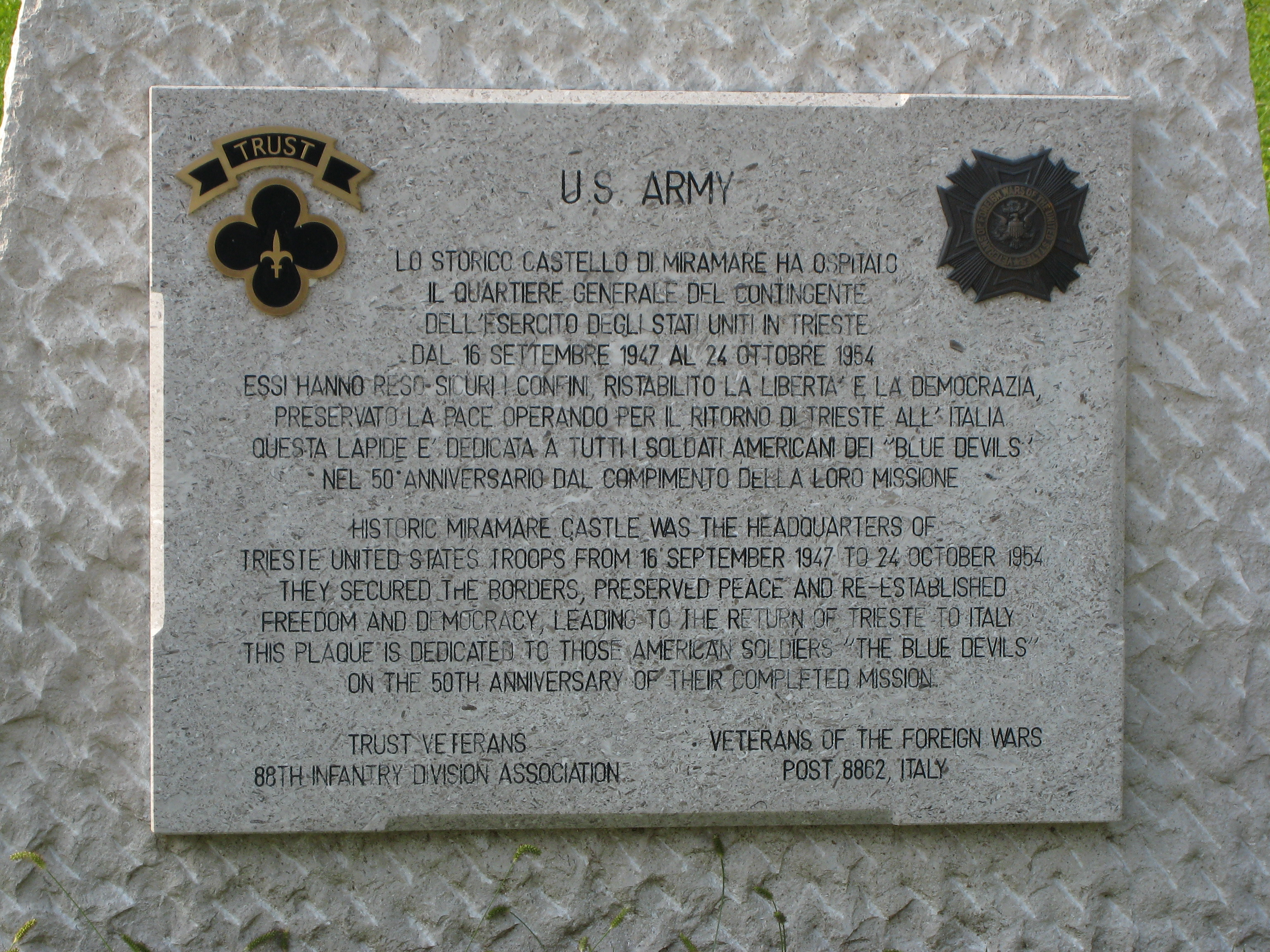
Free Territory of Trieste- Miramare Park – Blue Devils Plaque

- Total battle casualties: 13,111
- Killed in action: 2,298
- Wounded in action: 9,225
- Missing in action: 941
- Prisoner of war: 647

=== Post war ===
After the war, the 88th Infantry Division absorbed some personnel and units from the 34th Infantry Division and served on occupation duty in Italy guarding the Morgan Line from positions in Italy and Trieste.

The 351st Infantry was relieved from assignment to the division on 1 May 1947 and served as temporary military Government of the Free Territory of Trieste, securing the new independent State between Italy and Yugoslavia on behalf of the United Nations Security Council. It became the core of Trieste United States Troops (TRUST), which served as the front line in the Cold War from 1947 to 1954, including confrontations with Yugoslavian forces.

The division's occupation duty continued until 15 September 1947 when the Italian peace treaty came into force.

The division was inactivated on 24 October 1947 in Italy.

=== Cold War and beyond ===
The 88th Army Reserve Command (ARCOM) was activated at Fort Snelling on December 26, 1967, as one of 18 ARCOMs which were organized to provide command and control to Army Reserve units. It became fully operational from January 1968.

The initial area of responsibility for the 88th ARCOM included Minnesota and Iowa, and this area was later expanded to include Wisconsin. Army Reserve Commands were authorized to use the number and shoulder sleeve insignia of infantry divisions with the same number. However, ARCOMs did not inherit the lineage and honors of the divisions because it was against Department of the Army policy for a Table of Distribution and Allowances organization, such as an ARCOM, to perpetuate the lineage and honors of a Table of Organization and Equipment formation, like the 88th Infantry Division.

By 1990-91, the 83rd, 86th, and 88th ARCOMS were under Fourth United States Army, located at Fort Sheridan, Ill. The Headquarters, 88th ARCOM was located at Building 506 at Fort Snelling, and the Command mobilized 14 units for Desert Storm.

In 1996, when the Army Reserve's command structure was revised, the 88th Regional Support Command (88th RSC) was established at Fort Snelling. Its mission was to command Army Reserve units in a six state region, which included Minnesota, Wisconsin, Illinois, Indiana, Michigan and Ohio. In addition, the 88th RSC ensured operational readiness, provided area support services, and supported emergency operations in its area of responsibility.

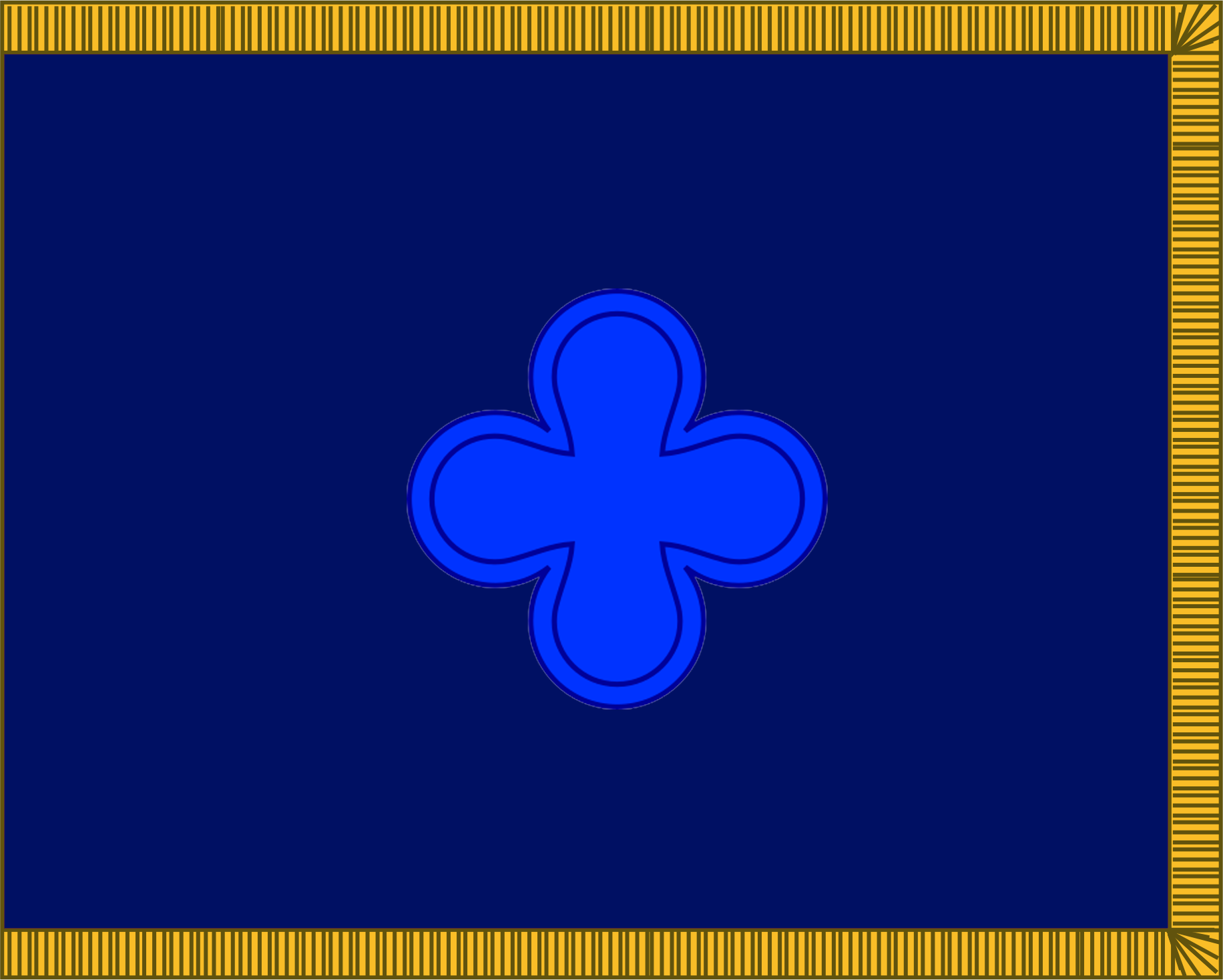
88th Readiness Command Flag

In 2003, the Army Reserve's command structure was again revised, and the 88th Regional Readiness Command (88th RRC) was formed at Fort Snelling with responsibility for USAR units in the same six states included in the 88th RSC. Various Combat Support units mobilized and deploy to Operation Iraqi Freedom in late 2003-mid 2004.

In its 2005 BRAC Recommendations, DoD recommended that the 88th Regional Readiness Command at Fort Snelling, MN be disestablished. This recommendation was part of a larger recommendation to re-engineer and streamline the Command and Control structure of the Army Reserve that would create the Northwest Regional Readiness Command at Fort McCoy, Wisconsin.

In 2008, the 88th RRC moved to Fort McCoy, Wisconsin. The mission was changed to provide base operations support to the new 19 state region, Welcome Home Warrior ceremonies, and the Yellow Ribbon weekends. The units assigned to the 88th RSC include 6 Army Reserve Bands and the Headquarters Company. It may supervise the 643rd Area Support Group at Whitehall, Ohio.

In 2017, the 88th RSC was reorganized as the 88th Readiness Division at Fort McCoy.

=== Operation Allies Welcome ===
The 88th was ordered to support Operation Allies Refuge in August 2021 as the core of Task Force McCoy. From August 2021 until February 2022, the task force assisted in feeding, housing, clothing, and providing assistance to the more than 12,600 Afghans resettling in the United States. Major subordinate elements of the task force included the Fort McCoy Garrison, the 181st Infantry Brigade, 302nd Maneuver Enhancement Brigade, 720th MP Battalion, and the 1st Squadron, 32nd Cavalry.

== Units in 2025 ==
The division is a subordinate geographic command of the United States Army Reserve Command. The division provides programs and services that enhance individual and unit readiness for mobilization and deployment of Army Reserve forces in the states of Colorado, Idaho, Illinois, Indiana, Iowa, Kansas, Michigan, Minnesota, Missouri, Montana, Nebraska, North Dakota, Ohio, Oregon, South Dakota, Utah, Washington, Wisconsin, and Wyoming. As of December 2025 the division consists of the following units:

- 88th Readiness Division, at Fort Snelling (MN)
  - I Corps Main Command Post — Operational Detachment (MCP-OD), at Joint Base Lewis–McChord (WA)
  - 7th Infantry Division — Army Reserve Element, at Joint Base Lewis–McChord (WA)

Public Affairs units:
- 318th Theater Public Affairs Support Element, in Arlington Heights (IL)
  - 220th Public Affairs Detachment, in Southfield (MI)
  - 350th Public Affairs Detachment, in Indianapolis (IN)
  - 367th Mobile Public Affairs Detachment, in Whitehall (OH)
  - 368th Public Affairs Detachment, in Milwaukee (WI)
- 364th Theater Public Affairs Support Element, at Fort Snelling (MN)
  - 203rd Public Affairs Detachment, at Fort Des Moines (IA)
  - 207th Public Affairs Detachment, in Wichita (KS)
  - 304th Public Affairs Detachment, at Joint Base Lewis–McChord (WA)
  - 358th Public Affairs Detachment, at Fort Douglas (UT)
  - 366th Mobile Public Affairs Detachment, in Denver (CO)

Military History Detachments:
- 29th Military History Detachment, at Joint Base Lewis–McChord (WA)
- 48th Military History Detachment, in Forest Park (IL)
- 49th Military History Detachment, in Forest Park (IL)
- 50th Military History Detachment, at Fort Douglas (UT)
- 90th Military History Detachment, at Fort Douglas (UT)
- 101st Military History Detachment, in Lawrence (KS)

Chaplain Detachments:
- 93rd Chaplain Detachment, in Denver (CO)
- 116th Chaplain Detachment, at Joint Base Lewis–McChord (WA)
- 117th Chaplain Detachment, at Fort Douglas (UT)
- 118th Chaplain Detachment, at Fort Des Moines (IA)
- 120th Chaplain Detachment, in Indianapolis (IN)
- 123rd Chaplain Detachment, in Tacoma (WA)
- 125th Chaplain Detachment, in Denver (CO)
- 126th Chaplain Detachment, at Camp Withycombe (OR)
- 131st Chaplain Detachment, in Jeffersonville (IN)

Army Bands:
- 204th Army Band, in Vancouver (WA) and at Fort Snelling (MN)
- 312th Army Band, in Lawrence (KS)
- 338th Army Band, in Whitehall (OH) and Livonia (MI)
- 484th Army Band, in Milwaukee (WI) and Arlington Heights (IL)

== Insignia and Lineage ==
The division's shoulder patch is A blue (for Infantry) quatrefoil, formed by two Arabic numeral "8s". A rocker above it with the nickname "Blue Devils" was often worn. During World War II, the Germans thought the 88th was an elite stormtrooper Division. This was most likely due to parallels between the "Blue Devil" nickname and patch rocker and the German SS's use of the Totenkopf death's head insignia.

== Decorations ==
Ribbon	Award	Year	Orders
	Army Meritorious Unit Commendation	Afghanistan Retrograde 2021-2022	Permanent Orders 032-0001 announcing award of the Army Meritorious Unit Commendation

== Notable personnel ==
- 1st Lieutenant James Henry Taylor
- Sgt Keith Matthew Maupin
