= Paul Wilkins Kendall =

American military officer (1898–1983)

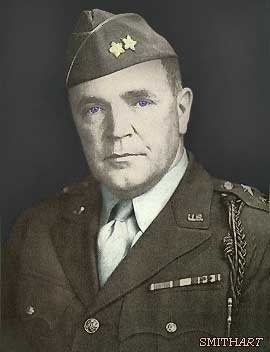
- Born: July 17, 1898; Baldwin City, Kansas, United States
- Died: October 3, 1983 (aged 85); Palo Alto, California, United States
- Burial place: West Point Cemetery, West Point, New York
- Military career
- Allegiance: United States
- Branch: United States Army
- Service years: 1918–1955
- Rank: Lieutenant General
- Service number: O-12199
- Unit: Infantry Branch
- Commands: 88th Infantry Division; 2nd Infantry Division; VI Corps; I Corps; Allied Land Forces Southeastern Europe
- Conflicts: Siberian Campaign; World War II; Korean War
- Awards: Distinguished Service Cross; Army Distinguished Service Medal (2); Silver Star (3); Legion of Merit; Bronze Star (2)

Lieutenant General Paul Wilkins Kendall (July 17, 1898 – October 3, 1983) was a senior United States Army officer who served during World War I, World War II and Korean War.

== Early life and military career ==
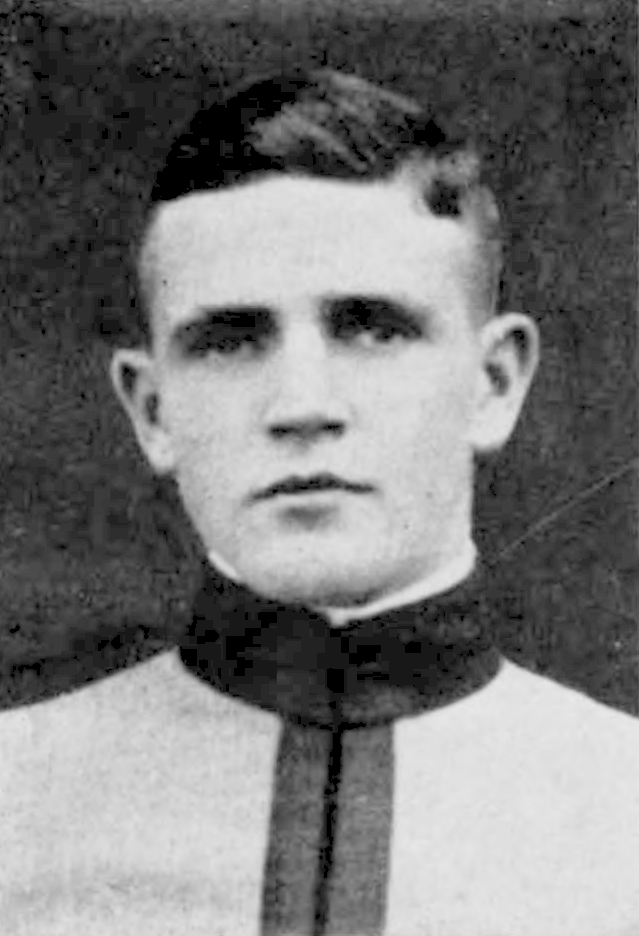
At West Point in 1918

Kendall was born on July 17, 1898, in Baldwin City, Kansas, and raised in Sheridan, Wyoming. In 1916, during World War I (although the American entry into World War I did not occur until April 1917), he obtained an appointment to the United States Military Academy (USMA) at West Point, New York, from which he graduated in November 1918, receiving his commission as a second lieutenant into the Infantry Branch of the United States Army. By the time he graduated, the war had come to an end with the signing of the Armistice.

== Siberian Campaign ==
Kendall attended the Infantry School of Arms at Fort Benning, Georgia, from late 1918 to early 1919.

After completing his training, he was assigned to the 27th Infantry Regiment during the Siberian Campaign. Kendall participated in an action on January 10, 1920, for which he received the Distinguished Service Cross. The citation for the medal reads:

The President of the United States of America, authorized by Act of Congress, July 9, 1918, takes pleasure in presenting the Distinguished Service Cross to Second Lieutenant (Infantry) Paul W. Kendall, United States Army, for extraordinary heroism while serving with 27th Infantry, 33d Division, A.E.F. (Siberia), in action at Posolskaya, Siberia, 10 January 1920. Lieutenant Kendall was in command of a detachment of his company when attacked by an armored train at 1 a.m. The detachment under his leadership and inspired by his example attacked and disabled the armored train and caused its surrender.

== Post-Siberian Campaign ==
Kendall carried out a variety of assignments in the 1920s and '30s, including a posting to Fort Logan, Colorado with the 38th Infantry Regiment in 1923 and served as an instructor in the Department of English and History at the United States Military Academy from 1925 to 1930 and later at Northwestern Military and Naval Academy. Kendall also performed duty in China, Hawaii and the Philippines.

In 1936, Kendall graduated from the Command & General Staff College. In the early 1940s, he served in a staff assignment at the Office of the Chief of Staff in Washington, D.C.

== World War II ==
At the start of World War II, Kendall was assigned as Chief of Staff of the 85th Infantry Division. He then served as Assistant Division Commander of the 84th Infantry Division, receiving a promotion to brigadier general.

From September 1944 to July 1945, Kendall was commander of the "Blue Devils" of the 88th Infantry Division and was promoted to major general. The division's second World War II commander, he led it during its assault through Italy, including the capture of Vicenza and Verona.

During the war, Kendall received the Silver Star for heroism on three occasions, two in 1944 and one in 1945.

== Post-World War II ==
From June 1946 to May 1948, Kendall was commander of the 2nd Infantry Division. In 1951, Kendall was assigned to occupation duty in Austria as commander of the American Zone. He was in that position until 1952, then he returned to the United States for a short assignment as commander of VI Corps at Camp Atterbury, Indiana.

== Korean War ==
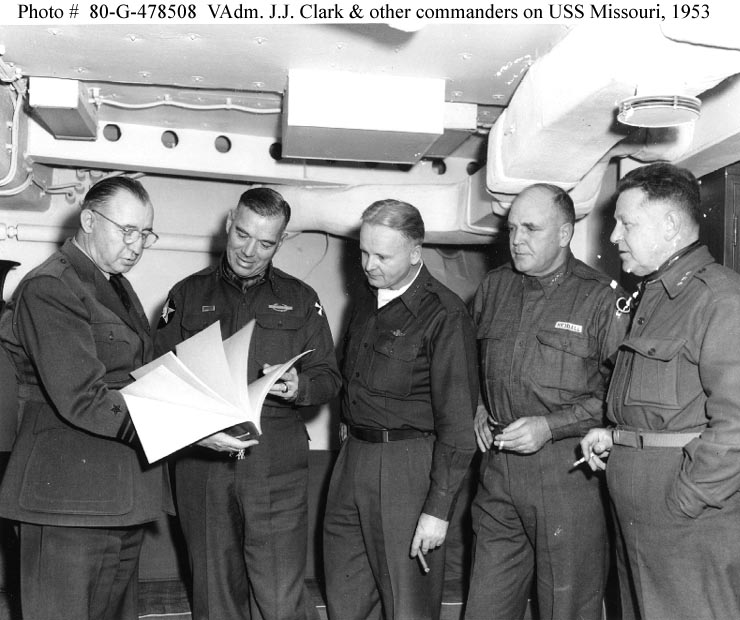
Senior commanders meet on board Seventh Fleet flagship off Korean waters. (Left to right): Vice Admiral Joseph J. Clark, USN, Commander, Seventh Fleet; General James A. Van Fleet, Commanding General, Eighth Army; Lieutenant General Glenn O. Barcus, Commanding General, Fifth Air Force; Lieutenant General Paul W. Kendall, Commanding General, First Army Corps; and Lieutenant General Reuben E. Jenkins, Commanding General, Ninth Army Corps.

In June 1952, Kendall became commander of I Corps, receiving promotion to lieutenant general. He led the corps as it manned a defensive line until the end of 1952. In January 1953, the corps took part in an offensive with troops of the 1st Republic of Korea (ROK) Division, attacking the enemy at Big Nori. Beginning in March, the North Koreans and Chinese continually attacked I Corps positions, and I Corps began a phased withdrawal that resulted in numerous enemy casualties. Kendall turned command of I Corps over to Bruce C. Clarke in April 1953.

== Post-Korean War ==
After leaving I Corps, Kendall was assigned as Deputy Commanding General, US Army Forces Far East, in Manila, Philippines.

In 1954, Kendall was assigned as commander of Allied Land Forces Southeastern Europe in İzmir, Turkey, where he served until his 1955 retirement.

== Personal life ==
General Kendall was married to Ruth Child Pistole (November 10, 1900 – January 29, 1985). They had two daughters, Jean and Elizabeth. Jean was the wife of Navy officer Neal D. Baumgardner and Elizabeth was the wife of Army officer Raymond O. Miller.

== Retirement and death ==
Kendall retired to Palo Alto, California, where he died on October 3, 1983. He was buried at West Point Cemetery.

=== Ribbon bar ===
Below is the ribbon bar of Lieutenant General Kendall:

| 1st Row | Distinguished Service Cross | | Army Distinguished Service Medal w/ Oak Leaf Cluster | |
| 2nd Row | Silver Star w/ two Oak Leaf Clusters | Legion of Merit | Bronze Star Medal w/ Oak Leaf Cluster | Purple Heart |
| 3rd Row | World War I Victory Medal w/ Siberia Clasp | Army of Occupation of Germany Medal | American Defense Service Medal | American Campaign Medal |
| 4th Row | European-African-Middle Eastern Campaign Medal w/ one silver and two bronze service stars | World War II Victory Medal | Army of Occupation Medal | National Defense Service Medal |
| 5th Row | Korean Service Medal | Commander of the Order of the Bath (United Kingdom) | Officer of the Legion of Honour (France) | French Croix de guerre 1914–1918 with Palm |
| 6th Row | French Croix de guerre 1939–1945 with Palm | Commander of the Order of Saints Maurice and Lazarus (Italy) | Czechoslovak War Cross 1918 | United Nations Korea Medal |

Military offices
| Preceded by John E. Sloan | Commanding General 88th Infantry Division; 1944–1945 | Succeeded by James C. Fry |
| Preceded by Edward Almond | Commanding General 2nd Infantry Division; 1946–1948 | Succeeded by Harry J. Collins |
