= General Fry =

General Fry may refer to:

- Birkett D. Fry (1822–1891), Confederate States Army brigadier general
- James Barnet Fry (1827–1894), Union Army brigadier general and brevet major general
- James C. Fry (1897–1982), U.S. Army major general
- Robert Fry (born 1951), Royal Marines lieutenant general
- Speed S. Fry (1817–1892), Union Army brigadier general
- William Fry (British Army officer) (1858–1934), British Army major general

== See also ==
- Joseph Frye (1712–1794), Massachusetts Militia general
