= James Fry =

James Fry may refer to:

- James Fry (politician) (1880–1948), member of the Queensland Legislative Assembly
- James Barnet Fry (1827–1894), American soldier and author
- James C. Fry (1897–1982), United States Army general
