= NSF =

NSF may stand for:

== Political organizations ==
- National Socialist Front, a Swedish National Socialist party
- NS-Frauenschaft, the women's wing of the former German Nazi party
- National Students Federation, a leftist Pakistani students' political group
- Norsk Syndikalistisk Forbund, a Norwegian anarcho-syndicalist group
- National Salvation Front (disambiguation), various organizations
- National Secessionist Forces, a fictional rebel group in the video game Deus Ex

== Other organizations ==
- Naga Students' Federation, student organization of the Naga people
- National Science Foundation, a United States government agency
- National Service Framework, one of various British health policies
- National Sleep Foundation, a U.S. nonprofit organization that promotes public understanding of sleep and sleep disorders
- NSF International, formerly the National Sanitation Foundation at the University of Michigan, a food safety standards group
- North Sea Fleet
- Nykterhetsrörelsens Scoutförbund, a Swedish scouting organization
- Norges Speiderforbund, a Norwegian scouting organization
- Palestinian National Security Forces
- NASASpaceFlight.com, a news website and forum covering spaceflight and aerospace engineering news
- Nederlandsche Seintoestellen Fabriek, defunct radio and television transmitter company in the Netherlands

== Medicine ==
- Nephrogenic systemic fibrosis, a disease
- N-ethylmaleimide sensitive fusion protein, an enzyme and gene

== Computing ==
- NES Sound Format (.nsf), an audio file format for the Nintendo Entertainment System
- Notes Storage Facility (.nsf), the file type for IBM Lotus Notes databases

== Other uses ==
- Non-sufficient funds, a cause for a bank to reject a check
- New Small Family, an automobile model range
- National Service Full-time, a type of conscription in Singapore
- Thiazyl fluoride, an unstable gas with the chemical formula NSF
- NSF, one of the call signs used by the radio station at the Anacostia Naval Air Station in Washington, D.C.
