= Robert Nelson Getty =

United States Army officer (1855–1941)

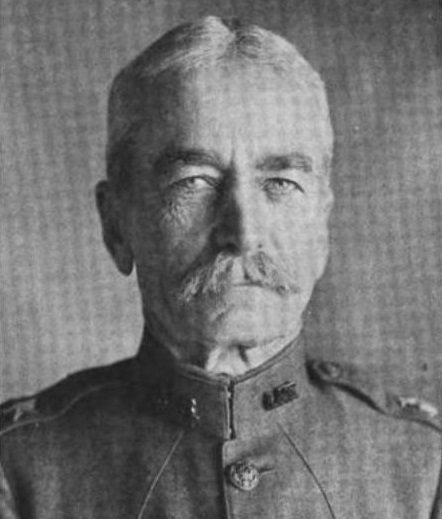
- From 1919's The 88th Division in the World War of 1914-1918
- Born: January 17, 1855; Fort Hamilton, New York, United States
- Died: April 15, 1941 (aged 86); California, United States
- Burial place: San Francisco National Cemetery, California, United States
- Spouse: Cornelia T. Colegate
- Relatives: George W. Getty (father)
- Military career
- Allegiance: United States
- Branch: United States Army
- Service years: 1878–1919
- Rank: Brigadier general
- Service number: 0-13361
- Unit: Infantry Branch
- Commands: 175th Brigade; 88th Division
- Conflicts: Ute Wars; Sioux Wars; Spanish–American War; World War I
- Awards: Silver Star

Brigadier General Robert Nelson Getty (January 17, 1855 – April 15, 1941) was a United States Army officer in the late 19th and early 20th centuries. He served in several conflicts, including the Sioux Wars, Spanish–American War, and World War I. He was the son of Major General George W. Getty.

== Military career ==
Getty was born in Fort Hamilton on January 17, 1855. He graduated from the United States Military Academy in 1878.

Getty was commissioned into the 22nd Infantry Regiment, and he did frontier duty from 1878 to 1896. During this time, he participated in the Ute War on 1884 and the Sioux War on 1890 and 1891. Getty also participated in the Spanish–American War, taking part in the Battle of El Caney, the Battle of San Juan Hill, and the Siege of Santiago. He served in the Sanitary Corps and received a Silver Star for his efforts there. After serving in the Philippines from 1900 to 1911, Getty commanded the Recruit Depot at Fort Logan from 1914 to 1917.

Getty was promoted to the rank of brigadier general on August 5, 1917, shortly after the American entry into World War I, and he commanded the 175th Infantry Brigade at Camp Dodge. From November 27, 1917, to February 19, 1918, and again from March 15 to May 24, 1918, Getty commanded the 88th Division, which did not go into combat. Getty retired from the Army in 1919 at his permanent rank of colonel.

Getty lived in Warrenton, Virginia, during his retirement. Congress restored his brigadier general rank in June 1930. He died in California on April 15, 1941.

== Personal life ==
Getty married Cornelia T. Colegate on October 14, 1885.

== Bibliography ==
- Davis, Henry Blaine Jr. (1998). Generals in Khaki. Raleigh, North Carolina: Pentland Press. ISBN 1571970886. OCLC 40298151.
- Marquis Who's Who (1975). Who Was Who In American History – The Military. Chicago, Illinois: Marquis Who's Who. ISBN 0837932017.

Military offices
Preceded by Edward H. Plummer	Commanding General 88th Division; 1917–1918	Succeeded by Edward H. Plummer
Preceded by Edward H. Plummer	Commanding General 88th Division; March–May 1918	Succeeded by William D. Beach
