= 30th Field Artillery Regiment (United States) =

- Active: 1918
- Country: United States
- Branch: Army
- Type: Field artillery
- Motto: Striving To The Highest

Commanders
- Notable commanders: John E. Sloan (1918)

Insignia
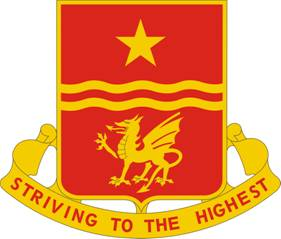
- Distinctive unit insignia

The 30th Field Artillery Regiment is a field artillery regiment of the United States Army, first constituted in 1918 in the National Army (USA).

== Lineage ==
Constituted 5 July 1918 in the National Army as the 30th Field Artillery and assigned to the 10th Division

Organized 10 August 1918 at Camp Funston, Kansas

Demobilized 5 February 1919 at Camp Funston, Kansas

Reconstituted 24 March 1923 in the Regular Army as the 30th Field Artillery

Activated 4 June 1941 at Camp Roberts, California

Regiment broken up 18 May 1944 and its elements reorganized and redesignated as follows:

Headquarters and Headquarters Battery as Headquarters and Headquarters Battery, 30th Field Artillery Group 1st and 2d Battalions as the 521st and 550th Field Artillery Battalions, respectively

After 18 May 1944 the above units underwent changes as follows:

Headquarters and Headquarters Battery, 30th Field Artillery Group, inactivated 31 July 1946 in Germany Activated 20 March 1951 at Camp Polk, Louisiana Inactivated 1 June 1958 in Germany; concurrently redesignated as Headquarters and Headquarters Battery, 30th Artillery Group

521st Field Artillery Battalion redesignated 1 May 1945 as the 30th Field Artillery Battalion Inactivated 9 February 1949 at Fort Bragg, North Carolina Activated 22 February 1950 at Fort Bragg, North Carolina Inactivated 25 June 1958 at Fort Lewis, Washington

550th Field Artillery Battalion inactivated 8 February 1946 at Camp Swift, Texas Headquarters and Headquarters Battery, 550th Field Artillery Battalion, redesignated 1 August 1946 as the 550th Field Artillery Battery and activated at Fort Benning, Georgia (organic elements concurrently disbanded) Battery inactivated 23 November 1948 at Fort Benning, Georgia Activated 1 February 1952 at Fort Bragg, North Carolina Redesignated 25 October 1952 as the 550th Field Artillery Rocket Battery Reorganized and redesignated 15 March 1957 as Headquarters, Headquarters and Service Battery, 550th Field Artillery Rocket Battalion (Battery A and Medical Detachment, 550th Field Artillery Battalion, concurrently reconstituted in the Regular Army, redesignated as Battery A and Medical Detachment, 550th Field Artillery Rocket Battalion, and activated at Fort Bliss, Texas) Battalion inactivated 25 June 1956 at Fort Bliss, Texas

Headquarters and Headquarters Battery, 30th Artillery Group; 30th Field Artillery Battalion; and the 550th Field Artillery Rocket Battalion consolidated, reorganized, and redesignated 31 July 1959 as the 30th Artillery, a parent regiment under the Combat Arms Regimental System

Redesignated 1 September 1971 as the 30th Field Artillery

Withdrawn 16 July 1988 from the Combat Arms Regimental System, reorganized under the United States Army Regimental System, and transferred to the United States Army Training and Doctrine Command

== Distinctive unit insignia ==
- Description

A Gold color metal and enamel device 1 1/8 inches (2.9 cm) in height overall consisting of a shield blazoned: Gules, two barrulets wavy between a mullet and a lindwurm passant Or. Attached below and to the sides of the shield a Gold scroll inscribed "STRIVING TO THE HIGHEST" in Red letters.

- Symbolism

The field is red for the Field Artillery. The barrulets wavy symbolize the Pacific and Atlantic Ocean areas of service, with the North Star indicating Aleutian honors and the lindwurm (a German dragon) representing service in that theater.

- Background

The distinctive unit insignia was originally approved for the 30th Field Artillery Battalion on 24 August 1951. It was redesignated for the 30th Artillery Regiment on 12 November 1958. The insignia was redesignated for the 30th Field Artillery Regiment effective 1 September 1971.

== Coat of arms ==
- Blazon
- Shield

Gules, two barrulets wavy between a mullet and a lindwurm passant Or.

- Crest

On a wreath Or and Gules, in front of a bank of clouds Sable a tower of the first with three windows of the second above a cross of the third. Motto STRIVING TO THE HIGHEST.

- Symbolism
- Shield

The field is red for the Field Artillery. The barrulets wavy symbolize the Pacific and Atlantic Ocean areas of service, with the North Star indicating Aleutian honors and the lindwurm (a German dragon) representing service in that theater.

- Crest

The design of the crest refers to the unit's service in Germany during the critical years between 1951 and 1957. The tower stands for strength and vigilance. In addition, the tower with three windows is the symbol of St. Barbara, patroness of Artillerymen. The cross is taken from the arms of the city of Bonn, Capital of the Federal Republic of Germany which the organization stood ready to defend. The black clouds refer to the threat of war which hung over Europe during the above years when the organization was one of the units manning our first line of defense in Western Europe.

- Background

The coat of arms was originally approved for the 30th Field Artillery Battalion on 24 August 1951. It was redesignated for the 30th Artillery Regiment on 12 November 1958. It was amended to add a crest on 4 November 1964. The insignia was redesignated for the 30th Field Artillery Regiment effective 1 September 1971.

== Current configuration ==
=== Active Elements ===
- 1st Battalion 30th Field Artillery Regiment

=== Inactive Elements ===
- 2d Battalion 30th Field Artillery Regiment
- 3d Battalion 30th Field Artillery Regiment
- 4th Battalion 30th Field Artillery Regiment
- 5th Battalion 30th Field Artillery Regiment
- 6th Battalion 30th Field Artillery Regiment

== Campaign participation credit ==
World War II: Aleutian Islands; Rhineland; Central Europe

Vietnam Defense: Counteroffensive; Counteroffensive, Phase II; Counteroffensive, Phase III; Tet Counteroffensive; Counteroffensive, Phase IV; Counteroffensive, Phase V; Counteroffensive, Phase VI; Tet 69/Counteroffensive; Summer-Fall 1969; Winter-Spring 1970; Sanctuary Counteroffensive; Counteroffensive, Phase VII

== Decorations ==
Valorous Unit Award for FISH HOOK

Meritorious Unit Commendation (Army) for VIETNAM 1966-1967

Meritorious Unit Commendation (Army) for VIETNAM 1968

Meritorious Unit Commendation (Army) for VIETNAM 1968-1969

== See also ==
- Field Artillery Branch (United States)
