= George W. Getty =

United States Army general (1819–1901)

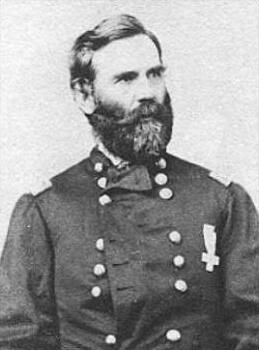
- Born: October 2, 1819; Washington, D.C., US
- Died: October 1, 1901 (aged 81); Forest Glen, Maryland, US
- Relatives: Robert Nelson Getty (son)
- Military career
- Allegiance: United States of America; Union
- Branch: United States Army; Union Army
- Service years: 1840–1883
- Rank: Brigadier General; Brevet Major General
- Commands: IX Corps; VII Corps; VI Corps
- Conflicts: Mexican–American War: Battle of Contreras; Battle of Churubusco; Seminole Wars; American Civil War: Peninsula Campaign; Battle of South Mountain; Battle of Antietam; Battle of Fredericksburg; Siege of Suffolk; Battle of the Wilderness; Battle of Opequon; Battle of Fisher's Hill; Battle of Cedar Creek; Third Battle of Petersburg

George Washington Getty (October 2, 1819 – October 1, 1901) was a career military officer in the United States Army, most noted for his role as a division commander in the Army of the Potomac during the final full year of the American Civil War.

== Early life ==
Getty was born in Georgetown, Washington, D.C. He was appointed to the United States Military Academy at West Point, New York, at the age of 16, and graduated 15th out of 42 graduates in the Class of 1840. Among his classmates were future Civil War generals William T. Sherman and George H. Thomas of the Union Army and Richard S. Ewell and Bushrod R. Johnson of the Confederate States Army. He was assigned to the artillery as a second lieutenant. During the Mexican–American War, he campaigned with Winfield Scott's army and received a brevet appointment as captain for gallantry at Contreras and Churubusco. He fought against the Seminole Indians in Florida in the last two Seminole Wars, seeing action in 1849–50 and again in 1856–57.

== Civil War ==
At the beginning of the Civil War, Getty was a captain in the 4th U.S. Artillery. In September, 1861, he was appointed lieutenant colonel. He commanded a brigade of regular army artillery batteries in Maj. Gen. George B. McClellan's 1862 Peninsula Campaign and Seven Days Campaign. Named Chief of Artillery of Maj. Gen. Ambrose Burnside's IX Corps, he served at the battles of South Mountain and Antietam during the Maryland Campaign. On September 25, 1862, Getty was promoted to the rank of brigadier general of volunteers and assigned to the infantry. During the Battle of Fredericksburg in December, he commanded the 3rd Division of IX Corps. In March, 1863, Getty's division was sent to Suffolk, Virginia, where the Federal Army under Maj. Gen. John A. Dix successfully resisted Lt. Gen. James Longstreet's investment of the town, which guarded the southern approaches to Norfolk and Hampton Roads.

After subsequent engineering duty and command of a diversion to the South Anna River during the Gettysburg campaign, Getty served as acting Inspector General of the Army of the Potomac. In early 1864, Getty was assigned to command 2nd Division, VI Corps and fought with great bravery and determination to hold a vital road intersection at the Battle of the Wilderness on May 5–6, 1864. He was wounded in the Battle of the Wilderness, but recovered to lead his troops during the lengthy Siege of Petersburg, and later in Maj. Gen. Philip Sheridan's Shenandoah Valley Campaign. Getty became acting commander of VI Corps when Brig. Gen. James B. Ricketts was wounded leading the corps at the Battle of Cedar Creek. On December 12, 1864, President Abraham Lincoln nominated Getty for appointment to the brevet grade of major general of volunteers, to rank from August 1, 1864, confirmed by the U.S. Senate on February 14, 1865. Getty's division, including the famed Vermont Brigade, made the initial breakthrough at Petersburg on April 2, 1865, and took part in the final campaign of the Army of the Potomac, which concluded with the surrender of Robert E. Lee at Appomattox Court House. On July 17, 1866, President Andrew Johnson nominated Getty for appointment to the brevet grade of major general, U.S. Army (Regular Army), to rank from March 13, 1865, which the U.S. Senate confirmed the appointment on July 23, 1866. Getty was mustered out of the volunteer force on October 9, 1866.

== Postbellum career ==
Getty was in command of the District of Baltimore, Maryland., Aug. 9, 1865, to January, 29th, 1866. Then he was in command of the District of the Rio Grande, February 19 to August 31, 1866. During this time on July 28, 1866, Getty was appointed colonel of the 37th U.S. Infantry in the regular army.

He next served in command of the District of Texas, from August 31 to October 9, 1866, during which time he was mustered out of Volunteer Service, on September 1, 1866. Following a leave of absence, awaiting orders, he was given command of the District of New Mexico, from April 11, 1867, to January 11, 1871.

He transferred to command the 3rd U.S. Infantry, March 15, 1869. Getty then transferred to the 3rd U.S. Artillery on December 31, 1870, and then commanded the Artillery School at Fortress Monroe, Virginia, for six years. In 1875 Getty extended the curriculum, previously restricted to technical aspects of artillery handling, to include "military art and science" - geography, military history and law. From June 24 to July 25, 1877, Getty was detached in command of troops along the Baltimore and Ohio Railroad during labor strikes.

Getty was a member of the Board of Conduct which exonerated former V Corps commander Maj. Gen. Fitz John Porter in 1879. He transferred to the 4th U.S. Artillery on July 17, 1882.

General Getty was a member of several military societies including the Aztec Club of 1847, the Military Order of the Loyal Legion of the United States and the Military Order of Foreign Wars.

After he retired from the Army on October 2, 1883, Getty lived on a farm near Forest Glen, Maryland, until his death there on October 1, 1901. Getty was buried in Section 1 of Arlington National Cemetery.

General Getty Neighborhood Park, located near his farm in Forest Glen, is named after him.

== Family ==
General Getty's son, Robert Nelson Getty (1855–1941), graduated from West Point in 1878 and served until he reached the mandatory retirement age of 64 in 1919. He was a veteran of the Indian Wars, the Spanish–American War, the Philippine Insurrection and the First World War, during which he was promoted to brigadier general.
