= Nationalist army =

Nationalist army may refer

- The Nationalist Army of Africa in Spain under Franco
- The National Revolutionary Army of the Republic of China
  - The Republic of China Armed Forces the armed forces of the Republic of China now on Taiwan.
- The Republic of Korea Armed Forces of South Korea

== See also ==
- 國軍 (disambiguation) (in Chinese characters)
