= National Salvation Front =

The term National Salvation Front has been used by political parties in several countries:

- National Salvation Front (Benin)
- National Salvation Front (Cambodia)
- National Salvation Front (Egypt)
- National Salvation Front (Lebanon)
- National Salvation Front (Romania)
- National Salvation Front (Russia)
- National Salvation Front (Tunisia)
- National Front for Salvation (Tunisia)
- National Salvation Front (Sri Lanka)
- National Front for the Salvation of Libya
- National Salvation Front (South Sudan)
- National Salvation Front in Syria

== See also ==
- National Salvation Army (disambiguation)
- National Salvation Movement (Colombia)
- National Salvation Government (Libya)
- National Salvation Junta (Portugal)
- National Salvation Committee (Ukraine)
- National Salvation Party (Turkey)
