= 國軍 =

國軍 (pinyin: Guó jūn; Kana: こくぐん Kokugun, Hangul: 국군 Gukgun) may refer to:

- Imperial Japanese Armed Forces (大日本帝國軍)
- National Revolutionary Army (國民革命軍)
- Republic of China Armed Forces (中華民國國軍)
- Republic of Korea Armed Forces (대한민국 국군, 大韓民國 國軍)

== See also ==
- Nationalist army (disambiguation)
