= John E. Sloan =

US Army major general (1887–1972)

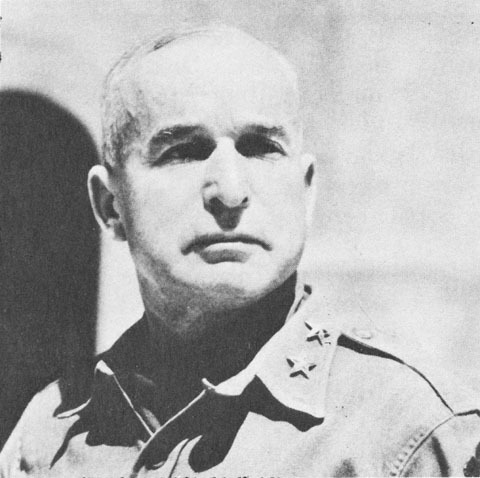
- Sloan as 88th Infantry Division commander during World War II
- Born: January 31, 1887; Greenville, South Carolina, US
- Died: October 15, 1972 (aged 85); Asheville, North Carolina, US
- Burial place: Arlington National Cemetery
- Alma mater: United States Naval Academy; United States Army Command and General Staff College; United States Army War College
- Spouse(s): Helen Worrell Moore (m. 1912–1917) Amy Vance Eubank (m. 1919–1971)
- Children: 1
- Relatives: John Sloan Brown (grandson)
- Military career
- Service: United States Navy; United States Army
- Service years: 1910–1911 (Navy); 1911–1946 (Army)
- Rank: Major General
- Service number: O3018
- Unit: US Army Field Artillery Branch
- Commands: Army Decorations Board; 88th Infantry Division; 76th Field Artillery Regiment; 17th Field Artillery Regiment; Civilian Conservation Corps Camp 1711; Fourth Army Umpire School; 30th Field Artillery Regiment
- Wars: World War I World War II
- Awards: Army Distinguished Service Medal; Silver Star; Legion of Merit

John Emmitt Sloan (31 January 1887 – 15 October 1972) was a career officer in the United States Army. A veteran of World War I and World War II, he attained the rank of major general as commander of the 88th Infantry Division during the Second World War. Sloan served from 1910 until retiring in 1946, and his awards and decorations included the Army Distinguished Service Medal, Silver Star, and Legion of Merit.

Sloan was born and raised in Greenville, South Carolina and attended Furman University before beginning studies at the United States Naval Academy, from which he graduated in 1910. He served in the United States Navy from 1910 to 1911, then transferred his military membership to the United States Army. Initially assigned to the Coast Artillery, he was subsequently reassigned to the Field Artillery. During World War I, he rose in rank to temporary colonel and command of the 30th Field Artillery Regiment. After the war, he continued to serve in command and staff assignments as he advanced through the ranks, including command of a Civilian Conservation Corps Camp in Kansas and command of the Fourth Army Umpire School that trained evaluators for World War II's Louisiana Maneuvers and Carolina Maneuvers.

During the Second World War, Sloan organized and trained the 88th Infantry Division, which he led in combat in Italy until illness compelled his return to the United States. He was then appointed president of the Army Decorations Board, which considered and acted on recommendations for awards to recognize wartime heroism. Sloan retired from the army in 1946. He died in Asheville, North Carolina on 15 October 1972 and was buried at Arlington National Cemetery.

== Early life ==
John E. Sloan was born in Greenville, South Carolina on 31 January 1887, a son of Thomas Majors Sloan and Anna Lucia (Johnston) Sloan. He was raised and educated in Greenville, and attended Furman University as a member of the class of 1907. In 1905, he began attendance at the United States Naval Academy, and he graduated in 1910 ranked 38th of 129. According to regulations then in force, which required Naval Academy graduates to serve for two years before receiving commissions as ensigns, after graduation Sloan was posted to the armored cruiser USS North Carolina as a midshipman.

In February 1911, Sloan transferred to the United States Army and received his commission as a second lieutenant of Coast Artillery. Initially assigned to the 41st Coast Artillery Company, in March he began the basic course for Coast Artillery Officers at Fort Monroe, Virginia. Subsequently assigned to the 118th Coast Artillery Company, in September 1911 he was transferred to the 141st Coast Artillery Company. He was promoted to first lieutenant in July 1916 and captain in May 1917.

== Early career ==
Sloan served in Coast Artillery assignments until 1917, including a posting to Panama. During World War I, he transferred from Coast Artillery to Field Artillery. After completing the Field Artillery Officer Basic Course as a student, he remained at Fort Sill's Field Artillery School as an instructor. He was promoted to temporary major in June 1918, temporary lieutenant colonel in September 1918, and temporary colonel in October 1918. In late 1918, Sloan commanded the 30th Field Artillery Regiment during its organization and training. In March 1920, he returned to his permanent rank of captain, and he was promoted to permanent major in July 1920.

After the war, Sloan continued to serve in the Field Artillery. He graduated from the Field Artillery Officer Advanced Course in 1924, completed the United States Army Command and General Staff College as a distinguished graduate in 1924, and was a 1932 graduate of the United States Army War College. During the 1920s and 1930s, his assignments included the Coast Artillery defenses of Chesapeake Bay, command of the 17th Field Artillery Regiment, executive officer of the 13th Field Artillery Brigade and 11th Field Artillery Brigade, and command of the 76th Field Artillery Regiment.

Additional postings Sloan carried out prior to World War II included professor of military science and tactics at Texas A&M University, instructor at the Command and General Staff College, and professor of military science and tactics at Oregon State University. In addition, he commanded Civilian Conservation Corps Camp 1711, which was located in Pittsburg, Kansas. In 1939, he organized and led the Fourth Army Umpire School, which trained the umpires who adjudicated the results of the Louisiana Maneuvers, Carolina Maneuvers, and other military exercises. At the start of the Second World War, Sloan took part in the organization and training of the 7th Infantry Division Artillery and 8th Infantry Division Artillery.

== Continued career ==
In July 1942, Sloan was assigned to command the 88th Infantry Division. At age 55, he was past the wartime age for appointment to command of a division, but his skills as an organizer and trainer led to his assignment to lead this all-draftee unit. After completing pre-deployment requirements at Camp Gruber, Oklahoma, the 88th Division departed for the European theatre in late 1943. It arrived in Casablanca in December 1943, then moved to Magenta, El Hacaiba, Algeria. In January 1944, the 88th Division departed for Italy, disembarked in Naples, and occupied an area near Piedimonte Matese, where it underwent final training and preparations for entering combat. The division took part in the Rome-Arno, North Apennines, and Po Valley campaigns in 1944 and 1945, and Sloan remained in command until September 1944, when illness led to his reassignment.

Upon returning to the United States, Sloan was appointed president of the Army Decorations Board. This panel reviewed requests to award top-tier decorations including the Medal of Honor, and either took action or recommended approval or disapproval to the chief of staff of the U.S. Army, depending on the level of the award. He retired on 31 October 1946. Sloan's wartime decorations included the Army Distinguished Service Medal, Silver Star, and Legion of Merit from the United States. In addition, he received the Legion of Honor (Officer) from France and the division was awarded the Croix de Guerre with palm, both for participation with French troops in the Italian campaign's 1944 Battle of Garigliano. In addition, he received the Order of Merit of Savoy (Commander) from Italy and the Order of the Military from Morocco.

=== Silver Star citation ===
The President of the United States of America, authorized by Act of Congress July 9, 1918, takes pleasure in presenting the Silver Star to Major General John Emmit Sloan (ASN: 0-3018), United States Army, for gallantry in action on 19 May 1944, near Itri, Italy. Commanding General of the 88th Infantry Division, elements of which were attacking the enemy in Itri on 19 May 1944, Major General Sloan entered the town at about 1200 hours to determine the progress of his troops. At that moment the enemy launched a heavy counter-attack, supported by tanks and observed artillery and mortar fire, on the town. Observing that the attack of his troops had been stopped, Major General Sloan, without regard for his own safety moved forward and personally issued orders to his troops to continue the assault. His personal presence and gallant action so inspired the assaulting troops that they pushed forward, broke up the enemy counter-attack and drove the enemy from the town. Major General Sloan’s intrepid leadership and heroic conduct were an inspiring example to the members of his command, and are in keeping with the highest traditions of the Armed Forces of the United States.

Service: United States Army Rank: Major General Division: 88th Infantry Division Action Date: May 19, 1944 Orders: Headquarters, II Corps, General Orders No. 60 (1944)

== Retirement ==
In retirement, Sloan resided in Weaverville, North Carolina and Asheville, North Carolina. He was long active in civic causes, including leadership roles with the Boy Scouts and Girl Scouts, Salvation Army, Red Cross, Tuberculosis Association, and Community Chest. He was also a member of the Asheville Military Manpower Committee, Buncombe County Welfare Planning Council, and Asheville Agricultural Development Council.

Sloan died in Asheville on 15 October 1972. He was buried at Arlington National Cemetery.

== Works by ==
- "Instructions To A Reserve Captain On What To Do To Organize A New Battery From Draft Personnel" (PDF). The Field Artillery Journal. Fort Sill, Oklahoma: US Field Artillery Association. September–October 1925. pp. 459–472.

== Dates of rank ==
Sloan's dates of rank were:

- Major General (retired), 31 October 1946
- Major General (Army of the United States), 20 May 1942
- Brigadier General (Army of the United States), 7 April 1941
- Colonel (Army), 1 December 1939
- Lieutenant Colonel (Army), 1 August 1935
- Major (Army), 1 July 1920
- Colonel (National Army), 24 October 1918
- Lieutenant Colonel (National Army), 18 September 1918
- Major (National Army), 19 June 1918
- Captain (Army), 15 May 1917
- First Lieutenant (Army), 1 July 1916
- Second Lieutenant (Army), 3 February 1911
- Midshipman (United States Navy), 8 July 1905
