= National Salvation Army =

National Salvation Army may refer several Chinese armies during the 1931–32 Japanese invasion of Manchuria and the Second Sino-Japanese War:

- Chinese People's National Salvation Army, anti-Japanese
- Heilungkiang National Salvation Army, anti-Japanese
- National Salvation Army (Manchukuo), a Japanese puppet force; see Li Jizhun
- Northeast Anti-Japanese National Salvation Army, anti-Japanese

== See also ==
- National Salvation Front (disambiguation)
- The Salvation Army
- Kuomintang in Burma, military forces organized by Li Mi and formally known as the Yunnan Anti-communist National Salvation Army
