= Edward H. Plummer =

United States Army general

Edward Hinkley Plummer
- Born: September 24, 1855; Elkridge, Maryland, US
- Died: February 11, 1927 (aged 71); Pacific Grove, California, US
- Military career
- Allegiance: United States
- Service years: 1877–1918
- Rank: Brigadier general
- Service number: 0-12123
- Conflicts: World War I

Brigadier General Edward Hinkley Plummer (September 24, 1855 – February 11, 1927) was the Commander of Camp Dodge.

== Early life ==
He was born on September 24, 1855, in Elkridge, Maryland. He was a cadet at the United States Military Academy from July 1, 1873 graduated June 14, 1877.

== Career ==
He was commissioned in the Tenth Infantry and performed frontier duty from 1877 to 1898.

From 1904 to 1907, he commanded Fort Egbert in Eagle, Alaska.

In 1917, he organized and served as the first commander of the Department of the Panama Canal.

He retired on November 30, 1918, at Camp Grant near Rockford, Illinois.

== Death and legacy ==
He died on February 11, 1927, in Pacific Grove, California. He was buried at the Presidio of Monterey, California.

His papers are held by the Defense Language Institute's Foreign Language Center Archives.
