= James C. Fry =

United States Army general

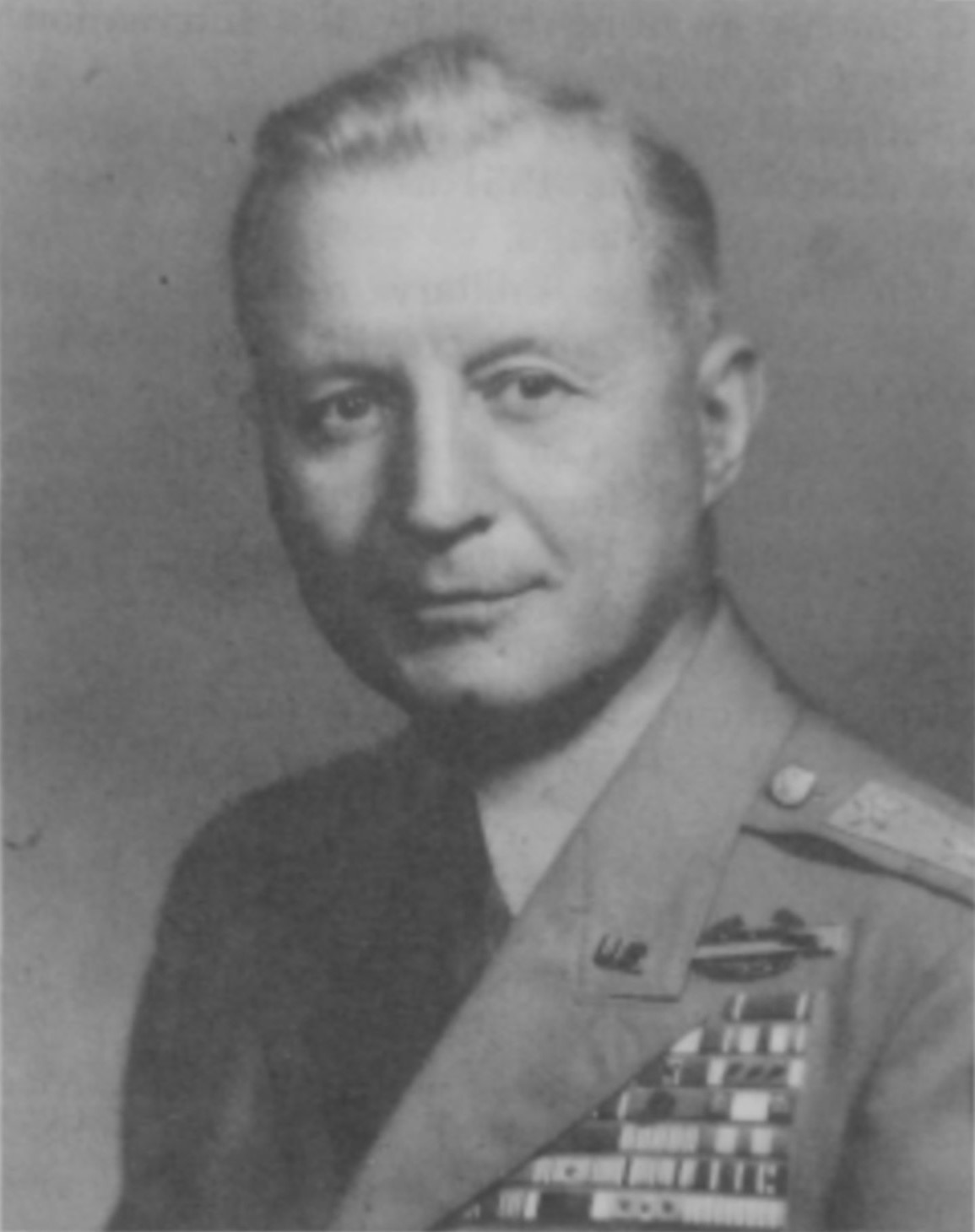
- Born: December 25, 1897; Sandpoint, Idaho
- Died: October 27, 1982 (aged 84); Falls Church, Virginia
- Burial place: Arlington National Cemetery
- Military career
- Allegiance: United States
- Branch: United States Army
- Service years: 1922–1957
- Rank: Major General
- Service number: 0-15023
- Commands: 69th Armored Regiment; 350th Infantry Regiment; 88th Infantry Division; 2nd Infantry Division
- Conflicts: World War II; Korean War
- Awards: Distinguished Service Cross; Distinguished Service Medal; Silver Star; Legion of Merit (2); Bronze Star Medal; Purple Heart (4)

James Clyde Fry (December 25, 1897 – October 27, 1982) was a Major General in the United States Army who served as an infantry regiment and division commander during World War II and the Korean War. Fry was awarded the Distinguished Service Cross for extraordinary heroism during World War II.

== Early life ==
A native of Idaho, Fry grew up on his parents' farm several miles from Sandpoint, Idaho where Fry and his brothers and sisters attended school. Fry quit high school and went to work in the nearby Talache silver mines for a few years. Then one day when walking past a local country store Fry observed two men loafing on the store porch spitting tobacco juice and it was at that moment Fry decided he would return to school as such a life was not for him. Fry graduated from high school in 1919 and was appointed to the United States Military Academy at West Point that same year.

== Military career ==
=== Early career ===
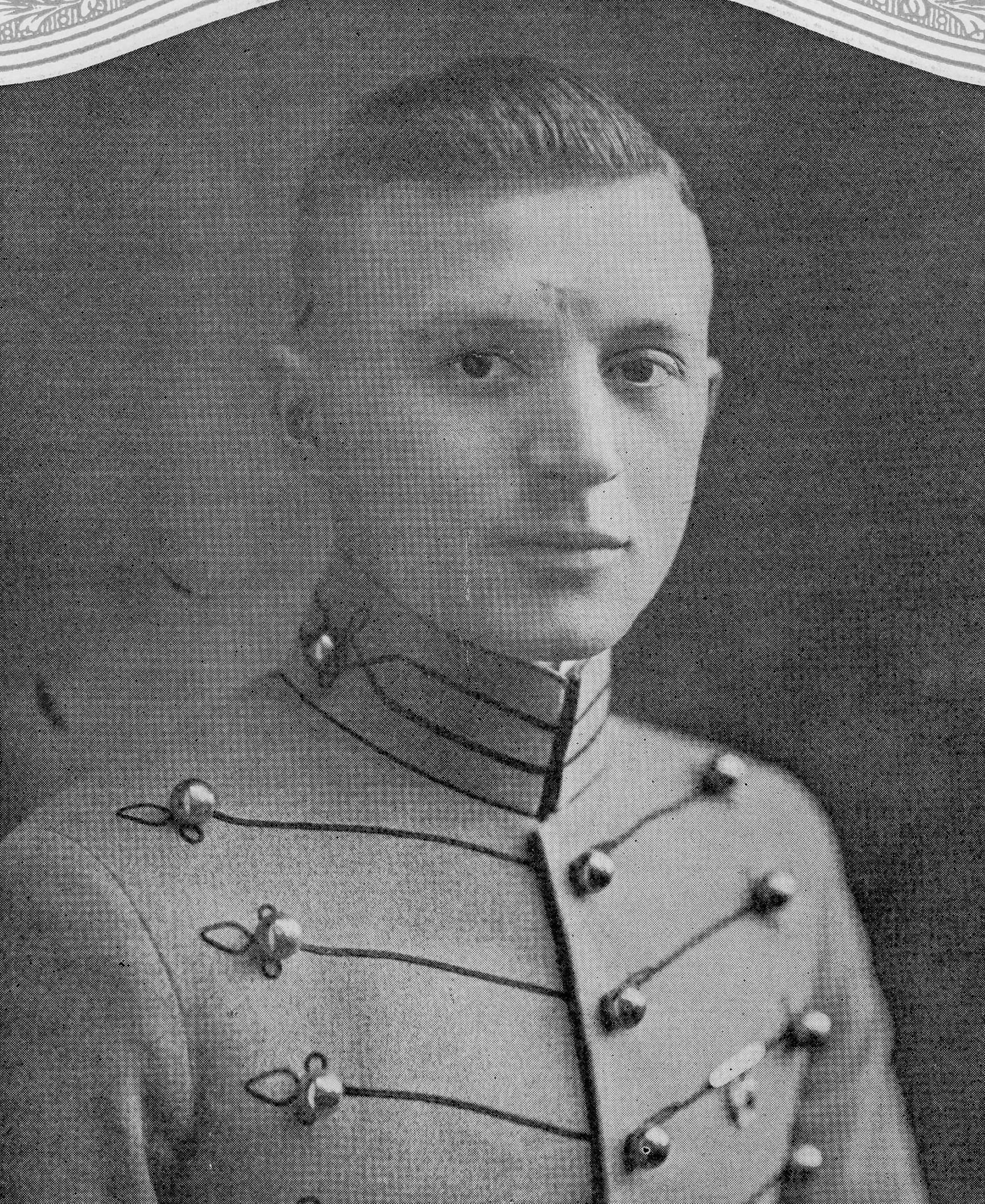
At West Point in 1922

Fry graduated from West Point 29th of 30 in the Class of June 1922 and was commissioned a second lieutenant of infantry in the United States Army. After serving with the 9th Infantry at Fort Sam Houston, Texas, he graduated from the Primary Flying School at Kelly Field, Texas in September 1924. Failing to complete the advanced flying course, Fry returned to the infantry in November. Prior to World War II, his assignments included Schofield Barracks, Hawaii, the Army General Staff, Washington D.C., and the Philippines under General Douglas MacArthur.

Assigned to the 24th Infantry at Fort Benning, Georgia in October 1931, Fry graduated from the Infantry School advanced course in September 1933 and tank course in February 1934.

=== World War II ===
In 1941, Fry volunteered for and was assigned duty as a U.S. Military Observer with the British 8th Army then engaged in combat operations against German and Italian forces in the western Libyan Desert. Upon returning to the United States in 1942 he was assigned to the War Department General Staff in Washington D.C., training duties as commander, 69th Armored Regiment, in the California desert, and subsequently to staff duties as assistant G3 Headquarters Armored Command, Fort Knox, Kentucky. After months of frustrated efforts to obtain a combat assignment Fry was finally given the opportunity to command an infantry regiment in Italy. During U.S. combat operations in Italy from 1943 to the end of the war in 1945, Fry commanded the 350th Infantry Regiment, 88th "Blue Devil" Infantry Division, and was ultimately promoted to assistant division commander. Fry's extraordinary bravery and reputation for personally leading attacks at the front of the forward platoon with no riflemen in front of him earned Fry the nickname "Fearless Fosdick" (after the comics character) and endeared him to his subordinates.

=== Korean War ===
During the Korean War Fry commanded the 2nd Infantry Division during combat operations against Communist Chinese and North Korean forces from May 4, 1952, to May 17, 1953.

=== Military awards and decorations ===
Fry's United States Military awards and decorations include the Distinguished Service Cross, Distinguished Service Medal, Silver Star, Legion of Merit, Bronze Star, Purple Heart with three oak leaf clusters, and the Combat Infantry Badge. His foreign decorations include the Croix de Guerre and Legion of Honor from France, the Order of the Crown of Italy, the Order of Orange-Nassau with Swords from the Netherlands, the Czechoslovak War Cross and the Most Exalted Order of the White Elephant from Thailand.

== Retirement ==
Following his retirement from the United States Army in 1957, Fry became an advocate for military readiness and was a founder, lifetime member, board chairman, and president of the National Association of the Uniformed Services. He was a leading figure in the evolution of Civil War reenactments into their modern form and was the driving force behind the Centennial re-enactment of the First Battle of Bull Run, July 21, 1961.

Fry also wrote the book Combat Soldier, which is a documentary of the U.S. Army World War II Italian Campaign and a tribute to the American "doughboys" who fought there. The book is based on personal notes written by Fry during the war and was published in 1968.

In 1973, Fry served as a member of President Nixon's executive board of the National Citizens Committee for Fairness to the President. During the Cold War, Fry was one of 170 prominent retired generals and admirals who were signatories of a public letter to President Jimmy Carter published in The New York Times urging the president to reinforce Israel's military capability, restore the global military balance between the United States and the Soviet Union and reestablish America's credibility as a leader of the free world, and desist from any arms control agreements with the Soviet Union that would reinforce permanent Soviet strategic superiority. Fry was also one of the original organizers of the 88th Infantry Division Association.

== Personal life ==
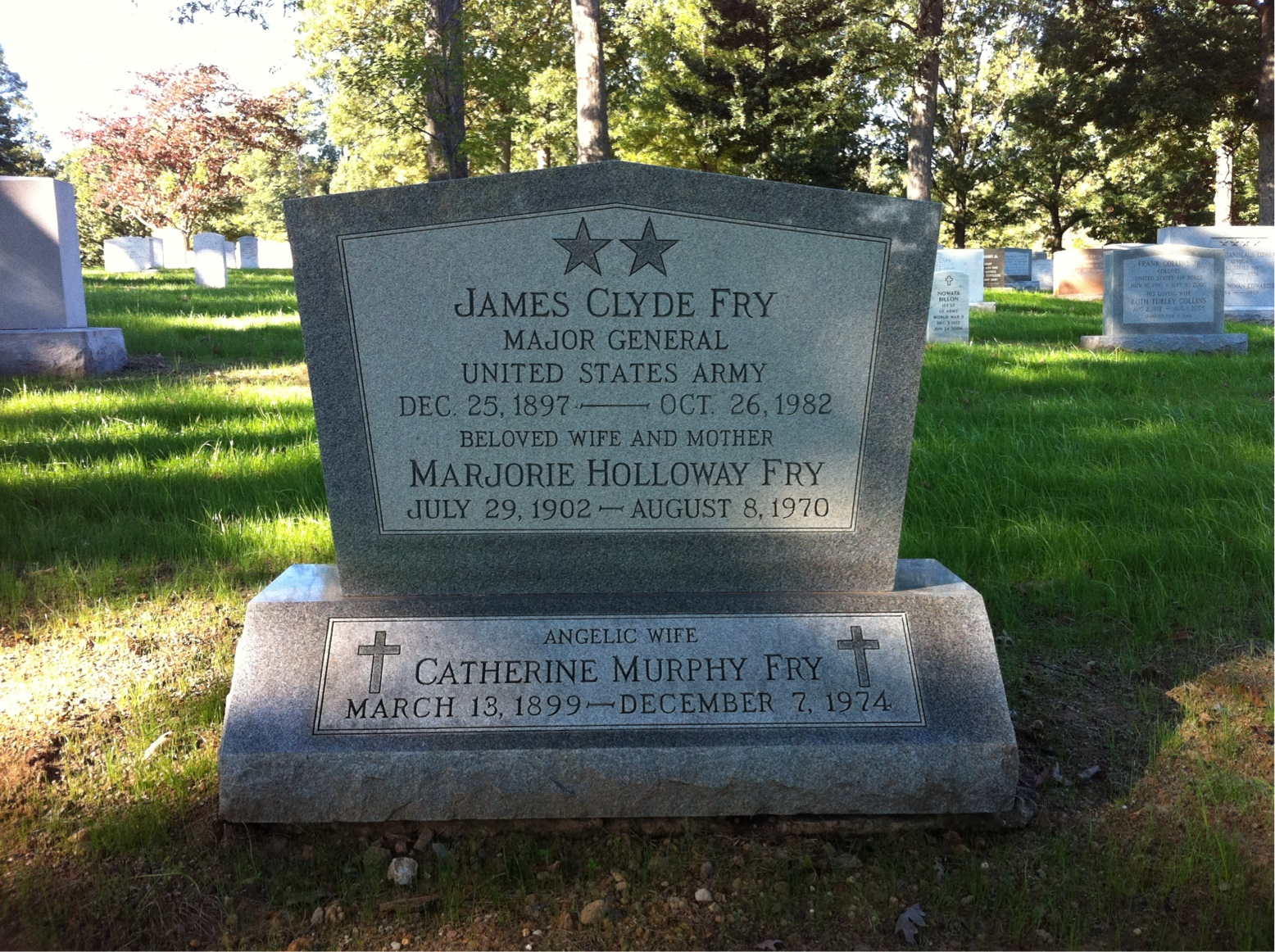
Grave at Arlington National Cemetery

Fry was married to the former Marjorie Holloway of Teaneck, New Jersey in February 1924. Fry and Marjorie had one son, James C. Fry Jr., who was also a United States Military Academy graduate (1948) and served in the United States Army as an infantry officer until 1951. Their son died at age 31 in a boating accident on the Potomac River in 1956, leaving a wife, Patricia Klotts, with five children; three of the children were still in diapers. In August 1970 after a long illness Marjorie died. Fry was subsequently married to Catherine Kiel of College Station, Pennsylvania from 1971 until her death in June 1974. Then in 1975, at the suggestion of his sister Ruby Fry, he contacted his high school sweetheart Helen Ramsey, who was then a widow living in Ellensburg, Washington. The two were soon married in June 1975.

== Death and burial ==
Prior to retirement, Fry purchased a home in Falls Church, Virginia. He continued to live there until his death in 1982. Fry is buried in Arlington National Cemetery along with his first wife, Marjorie Fry (1902–1970) and his second wife, Catherine Fry (1899–1974).

== Distinguished Service Cross citation ==
The official United States Army citation for Fry's World War II Distinguished Service Cross reads:

The President of the United States of America, authorized by Act of Congress, July 9, 1918, takes pleasure in presenting the Distinguished Service Cross to Colonel (Infantry) James Clyde Fry (ASN: 0-15023), United States Army, for extraordinary heroism in connection with military operations against an armed enemy while serving as Commanding Officer of the 350th Infantry Regiment, 88th Infantry Division, in action against enemy forces on 4 October 1944, in Italy. Colonel Fry led his regiment, which was extremely tired from its arduous mountain fighting of the preceding days, in a swift and well executed maneuver towards Mount Battaglia and succeeded in taking this feature before the enemy had fully organized its defenses. The enemy, realizing the strategic importance of Mount Battaglia, launched a series of vicious counterattacks from three directions. Although his regiment was completely exposed on both flanks, and subjected to terrific artillery and mortar fire as well as flame throwers, Colonel Fry planned and supervised his defense in such a manner that the hill was held. During the six days that this hill was held against the determined enemy attacks, Colonel Fry, by his superior tactical skill and calm courage under murderous fire, inspired his troops to repulse intrepidly the terrific enemy assaults. On one occasion while he was with his front line elements, Colonel Fry was wounded in the arm by a shell burst, but remained with his troops until ordered by higher authority to go to the rear for treatment. Colonel Fry's courage and brilliant leadership contributed immeasurably to the success of a vital operation in the Allied advance towards the Po Valley and provided a lasting inspiration to those who served under him. His outstanding leadership, personal bravery and zealous devotion to duty exemplify the highest traditions of the military forces of the United States and reflect great credit upon himself, the 88th Infantry Division, and the United States Army.

== Works ==
- Assault Battle Drill (Harrisburg, Pa., Military Service Pub. Co., 1955) OCLC 3988270
- Combat Soldier (The Washington Press, 1968) OCLC 439851
