= 25th Infantry Division (United States) =

US Army jungle warfare formation

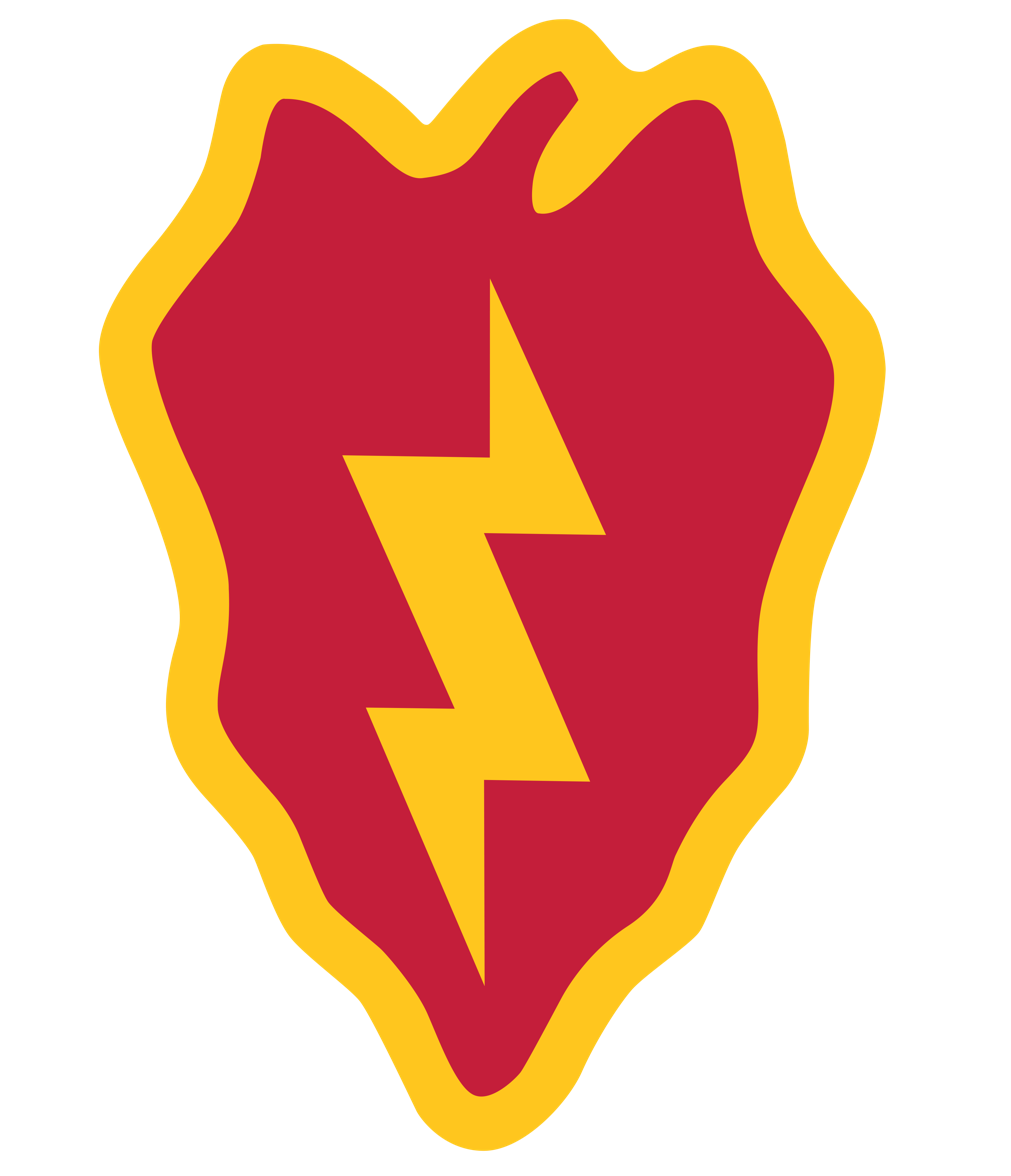
- Shoulder sleeve insignia of the 25th Infantry Division; the overall shape represents a taro leaf, indicating the division's Hawaiian origin. It is nicknamed the "Electric Strawberry".
- Founded: 26 August 1941–present
- Country: United States
- Branch: United States Army
- Role: Maneuver warfare
- Size: Division
- Part of: I Corps
- Garrison/HQ: Schofield Barracks, Wahiawa, Hawaii
- Nickname: "Tropic Lightning" (Special Designation)
- Motto: "America’s Pacific Division"
- Colors: Scarlet and yellow (the traditional colors of Hawaiian royalty)
- Engagements: World War II; Pacific War; Central Pacific; Guadalcanal; Northern Solomons; Luzon (1945); Korean War; UN Defensive; UN Offensive; CCF Intervention; First UN Counteroffensive; CCF Spring Offensive; UN Summer-Fall Offensive; Second Korean Winter; Korea, Summer-Fall 1952; Third Korean Winter; Korea, Summer 1953; Vietnam War; Counteroffensive; Counteroffensive, Phase II; Counteroffensive, Phase Ill; Tet Counteroffensive; Counteroffensive, Phase lV; Counteroffensive, Phase V; Counteroffensive, Phase VI; Tet 69/Counteroffensive; Summer- Fall 1969; Winter- Spring 1970; Sanctuary Counteroffensive; Counteroffensive, Phase VII; Global War on Terrorism; Afghanistan; Operation Freedom's Sentinel; Iraq; Operation Inherent Resolve

Commanders
- Commanding General: MG Jeffrey VanAntwerp
- Deputy Commander – Operations: COL Graham White
- Deputy Commanding General – Support: BG Robert Bryant
- Deputy Commander – interoperability: COL Aidan Shattock, New Zealand Army
- Command Sergeant Major: CSM Michael Eilers
- Notable commanders: General J. Lawton Collins, 1942–1943; Lieutenant General William B. Kean, 1948–1951; Lieutenant General Samuel Tankersley Williams, 1952–1953; Lieutenant General Jonathan O. Seaman, 1960; General Frederick C. Weyand, 1964–1967; General James T. Hill, 1997–1999; Lieutenant General William E. Ward, 1999–2000; Lieutenant General Robert L. Caslen, 2008–2009

Insignia
- Flag

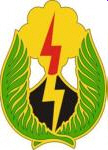
- Distinctive unit insignia 25th Infantry Division Headquarters and Headquarters Battalion

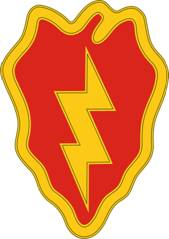
- Combat service identification badge

The 25th Infantry Division (nicknamed "Tropic Lightning") is a United States Army division based at Schofield Barracks in Hawaii. The division, which was activated on 1 October 1941 in Hawaii, conducts military operations primarily in the Asia-Pacific region. Its present deployment is composed of infantry brigade combat team (IBCT) and aviation units. Tropic Lightning soldiers regularly train with other U.S. military branches to practice and maintain joint operations capabilities. The climate and terrain of the Pacific region demands Tropic Lightning soldiers be able to operate in physically demanding and harsh environments. In 2014, the division opened the Jungle Operations Training Center (JOTC) —the first such school in the Army since the closing of the old Jungle Warfare School at Fort Sherman, Panama Canal Zone.

The division was originally activated from Hawaii garrison units during World War II, slightly more than two months before the Japanese attack on Pearl Harbor began the Pacific War. After spending almost a year training, it fought in the Allied counteroffensive during the Guadalcanal campaign from December 1942, helping to end organized Japanese resistance on that island by early February 1943. The 25th spent a period garrisoning the island, then moved on to fight in the New Georgia Campaign in July. After the Japanese defeat in New Georgia, it was sent to New Zealand later in 1943 for rest and training, before moving to New Caledonia for further training. The division returned to combat in the January 1945 invasion of Luzon, reducing Japanese resistance on the island until late June, after which it was pulled out of the line for training. The division then served in the occupation of Japan after the surrender of the latter from September 1945.

When the Korean War began in June 1950, the division was deployed to South Korea, where it fought in the defense of and the breakout from the Pusan Perimeter in mid-1950, with elements advancing as far as the Amnok River in November. After being thrown back by the Chinese Communist intervention in the war, the division eventually took up positions south of Osan. It participated in a series of United Nations counteroffensives in early 1951, then fought in a stalemate close to the 38th parallel from the middle of the year. The division defended Seoul against Chinese Communist attack from May 1953 to the July armistice, returning to Hawaii in late 1954.

After undergoing major reorganizations in 1957 and 1963 to adapt to changing tactics, the division deployed to South Vietnam to fight in the Vietnam War between late 1965 and early 1966. The 25th served in Vietnam until its withdrawal back to Hawaii in 1970–1971, participating in Operation Attleboro, Operation Cedar Falls, Operation Junction City, the Battle of Saigon during the North Vietnamese Tet Offensive, and the Cambodian Incursion. It was reorganized as a light infantry division in 1985, and elements have participated in the Iraq War and the War in Afghanistan.

== History ==
=== Lineage ===
Sources:

- Constituted 26 August 1941 in the Army of the United States as Headquarters, 25th Infantry Division, based on a cadre Force from the former Hawaiian Division.
- Activated 1 October 1941 at Schofield Barracks, Hawaii
- Allotted 27 June 1949 to the Regular Army
- Division headquarters reorganized and redesignated 1 April 1960 as Headquarters and Headquarters Company, 25th Infantry Division
- Reorganized and redesignated 16 November 2005 as Headquarters and Tactical Command Posts, 25th Infantry Division
- Reorganized and redesignated 16 January 2010 as Headquarters and Headquarters Battalion, 25th Infantry Division

=== World War II ===
==== Formation ====
The 25th Division was originally formed in the Army of the United States from the 27th and 35th Infantry Regiments of the Regular Army Hawaiian Division− a pre–World War II "square" division composed of two brigades each with two infantry regiments, and the 298th Infantry Regiment of the Hawaii National Guard. The remaining units of the Hawaiian Division were reorganized in the Regular Army as the 24th Infantry Division.

These steps, part of the "triangular" division reorganization, were undertaken to provide more flexibility, with direct divisional control of the three infantry regiments. On 23 July 1942, the 24th Infantry Division's 299th Infantry Regiment was inactivated after the transfer of many Nisei (second-generation Japanese-American) soldiers to form the 100th Infantry Battalion left its ranks depleted. The Washington National Guard's 161st Infantry Regiment, detached from the 41st Infantry Division and on duty in the Hawaiian Department, was at first attached, and then formally assigned as the 25th Infantry Division's third regiment on 3 August 1942.

==== Division organization ====
The 25th Infantry Division consisted of the following units.

25th Infantry Division organization (click to enlarge)

- 25th Infantry Division
  - 25th Infantry Division Headquarters
  - 25th Cavalry Reconnaissance Troop (Mechanized) (M3 scout cars and then M8 Greyhound armored cars)
  - 27th Infantry Regiment
    - Headquarters and Headquarters Company
    - 3× Infantry battalions
      - each battalion consists of: 1× Headquarters and Headquarters Company, 3× Rifle companies, 1× Heavy Weapons Company
    - Cannon Company (T12 Gun Motor Carriages and T19 Howitzer Motor Carriages, later replaced by either M3 105mm towed howitzers or M7 Priest self propelled howitzers)
    - Anti-Tank Company (M3 37mm anti-tank guns, which were replaced by 1944 with M1 57mm anti-tank guns)
    - Service Company
  - 35th Infantry Regiment
    - same organization as 27th Infantry Regiment
  - 161st Infantry Regiment (Washington Army National Guard; attached from 23 July to 3 August 1942; thereafter assigned)
    - same organization as 27th Infantry Regiment
  - 298th Infantry Regiment (relieved from assignment to the division on 23 July 1942 and transferred to the 24th Infantry Division)
    - same organization as 27th Infantry Regiment
  - 25th Infantry Division Artillery
    - Headquarters and Headquarters Battery
    - 8th Field Artillery Battalion
      - Headquarters and Headquarters Battery
      - 3× Batteries (M2 105mm towed howitzers)
      - Service Battery
    - 64th Field Artillery Battalion
      - same organization as 8th Field Artillery Battalion
    - 89th Field Artillery Battalion
      - same organization as 8th Field Artillery Battalion
    - 90th Field Artillery Battalion
      - Headquarters and Headquarters Battery
      - 3× Batteries (M1 155mm towed howitzers)
      - Service Battery
  - Headquarters Special Troops
    - Headquarters Company, 25th Infantry Division
    - 25th Signal Company
    - 25th Quartermaster Company
    - 725th Ordnance Light Maintenance Company
    - Military Police Platoon
    - 25th Infantry Division Band (attached)
  - 65th Engineer Combat Battalion
    - Headquarters and Headquarters and Service Company
    - 3× Engineer combat companies
  - 25th Medical Battalion
    - Headquarters and Headquarters Detachment
    - 3× Collecting companies
    - Clearing Company

==== Combat chronicle ====
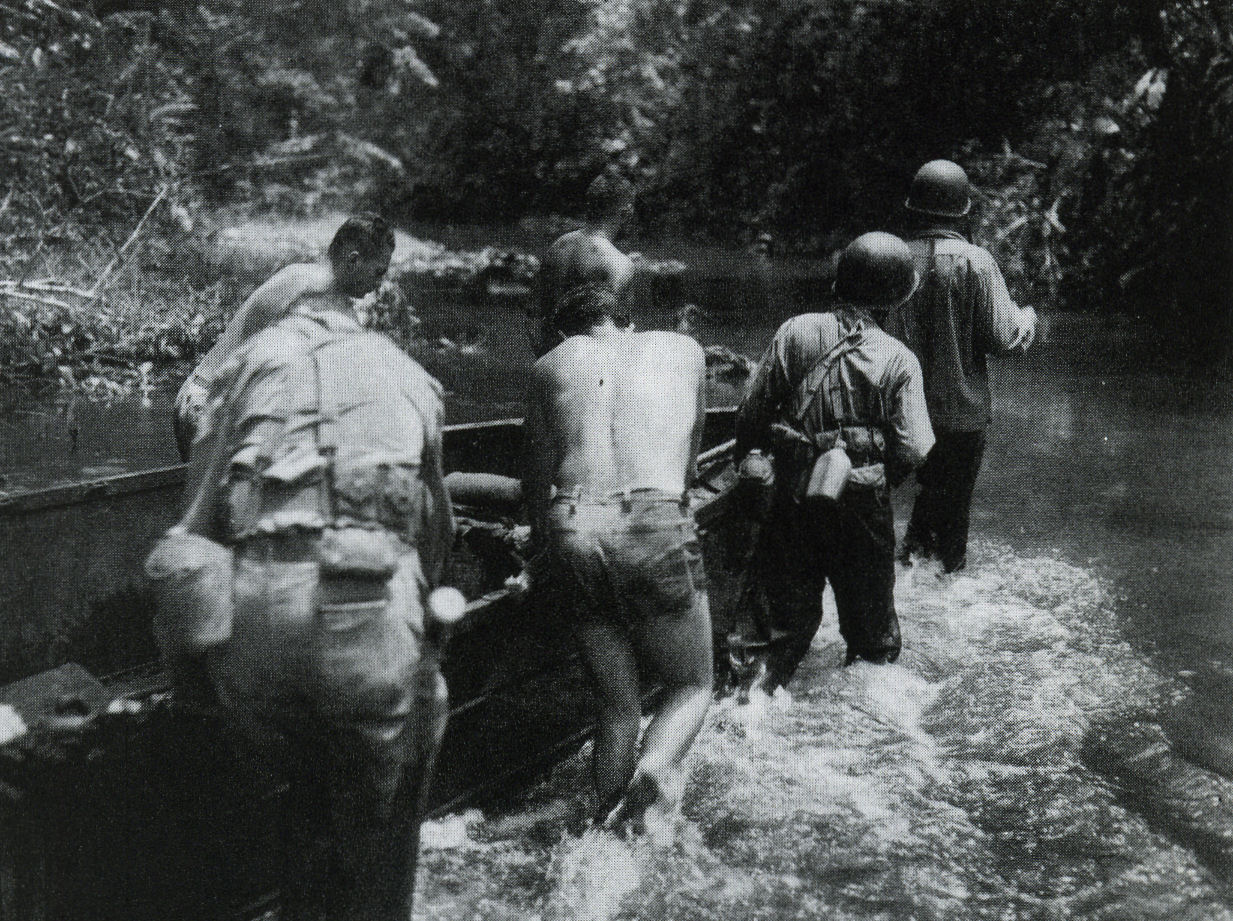
U.S. Army soldiers push supplies up the Matanikau River to support the 25th Infantry Division's offensive on Guadalcanal in January 1943.

After the Japanese air attack on Schofield Barracks on 7 December 1941, the 25th Infantry Division moved to beach positions for the defense of Honolulu and Ewa Point. Following intensive training, the 25th began moving to Guadalcanal, 25 November 1942, to relieve Marines near Henderson Field. First elements landed near the Tenaru River, 17 December 1942.

They entered combat on 10 January 1943, participating in the seizure of Kokumbona and the reduction of the Mount Austen Pocket in some of the bitterest fighting of the Pacific campaign. The threat of large enemy attacks caused a temporary withdrawal, but division elements under XIV Corps control relieved the 147th Infantry and took over the advance on Cape Esperance. The junction of these elements with Americal Division forces near the cape, 5 February 1943, ended organized enemy resistance.

A period of garrison duty followed, ending 21 July: On that date, advance elements debarked on Munda, New Georgia. The 25th Infantry, under the Northern Landing Force, took part in the capture of Vella Lavella, 15 August to 15 September 1943. Meanwhile, other elements landed on New Georgia, took Zieta, marched through jungle mud for 19 days, and captured Bairoko Harbor, winning the island. Elements cleared Arundel Island, 24 September 1943, and Kolombangara island with its important Vila Airport, 6 October. Organized resistance on New Georgia ended, 25 August, and the division moved to New Zealand for rest and training, last elements arriving on 5 December. The 25th was transferred to New Caledonia, 3 February-14 March 1944, for continued training.

The division landed in the San Fabian area of Luzon on 11 January 1945 to enter the struggle for the liberation of the Philippines. It drove across the Luzon Central Plain, meeting the enemy at Binalonan, 17 January. Moving through the rice paddies, the 25th occupied Umingan, Lupao, and San Jose and destroyed a great part of the Japanese armor on Luzon. On 21 February, the division began operations in the Caraballo Mountains in tandem with the 32nd Infantry Division which fought the Battle of Villa Verde Trail. The 25th fought its way along Highway No. 5, taking Digdig, Putlan, and Kapintalan against fierce Japanese counterattacks and captured Balete Pass, 13 May, and opened the gateway to the Cagayan Valley, 27 May, with the capture of Santa Fe. Until 30 June, when the division was relieved, it carried out mopping-up activities. On 1 July, the division moved to Tarlac for training, leaving for Japan, 20 September.

==== Casualties ====
- Total battle casualties: 5,432
- Killed in action: 1,236
- Wounded in action: 4,190
- Missing in action: 4
- Prisoner of war: 2

The division's rapid movements during its campaigns led to the adoption of the nickname "Tropic Lightning". It remained on occupation duty in Japan for the next five years.

=== Korean War ===
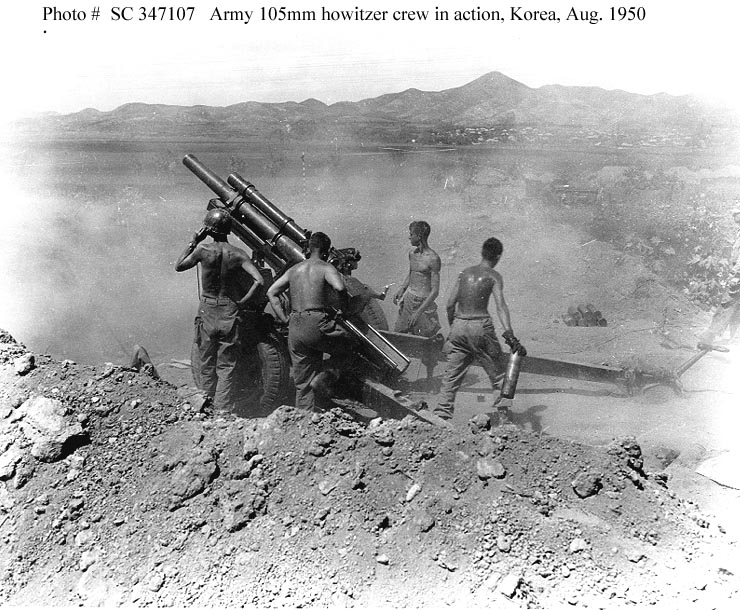
A gun crew of the 64th Field Artillery Battalion, 25th Infantry Division, fire a 105mm howitzer on North Korean positions near Uirson, South Korea, 27 August 1950.

The Korean War began on 25 June 1950 when the North Korean Korean People's Army (KPA) crossed the 38th Parallel to invade South Korea. Acting under United Nations (UN) orders, the division moved from its base in Japan to Korea between 5–18 July 1950 to join the Eighth United States Army. The division, then under the command of Major General William B. Kean, successfully completed its first mission by blocking the approaches to the port city Pusan. For this action, the division received its first Republic of Korea Presidential Unit Citation.

The division participated in the breakout from the Pusan perimeter commencing on 16 September and Eighth Army then began a general offensive northward against crumbling KPA opposition to establish contact with forces of the 7th Infantry Division driving southward from the Inchon beachhead. Major elements of the KPA were destroyed and cut off in this aggressive penetration; the link-up was affected south of Suwon on 26 September. On 23 September the division was assigned to the newly activated US IX Corps.

The UN offensive was continued northwards, past Seoul, and across the 38th Parallel into North Korea on 1 October. The momentum of the attack was maintained, and the race to the North Korean capital, Pyongyang, ended on 19 October when elements of the Republic of Korea Army (ROK) 1st Infantry Division and US 1st Cavalry Division captured the city. The advance continued, but against unexpectedly stiffening resistance. The Chinese People's Volunteer Army (PVA) entered the war on the side of North Korea, making their first attacks in late October.

The UN forces renewed their offensive on 24 November before being stopped by the PVA Second Phase Offensive starting on 25 November. The division was forced to carry out a systematic withdrawal and ordered to take up defensive positions on the south bank of the Chongchon River on 30 November 1950. Eventually, these lines failed and Eighth Army suffering heavy casualties, ordered a complete withdrawal to the Imjin River, near the 38th Parallel.

After a month and a half of planning and reorganization, a new offensive was launched on 25 January 1951 and succeeded in recapturing Inchon and Kimpo Air Base. This was the first of several successful assaults on the PVA/KPA. The division next participated in Operation Ripper, during which it drove the PVA across the Han River. Success continued with Operations Dauntless and Piledriver in early 1951. These offensives secured part of the Iron Triangle which enhanced the UN's bargaining position.

With leaders of four sovereign states now at the negotiating tables in the summer of 1951, Division activity slowed to patrol and defensive actions to maintain the line of resistance. This type of action continued into the winter of 1952. In January 1953 the division was transferred from IX Corps to I Corps and assumed the responsibility of guarding the approaches of Seoul on 5 May 1953. 23 days later, when ceasefire negotiations at Panmunjom stalled, a heavy PVA assault hit the Nevada Complex, the division held its ground; the brunt of the attack was absorbed by the attached Turkish Brigade and the 14th Infantry Regiment.

By successfully defending Seoul from continued attack from May to July 1953, the division earned its second Republic of Korea Presidential Unit Citation. Again, negotiators moved toward peace. In July, the division again moved to reserve status at Camp Casey where it remained through the signing of the armistice 27 July 1953. Fourteen division soldiers were awarded Medals of Honor during the Korean War, making the division one of the most decorated US Army divisions of that war.

The division's 14th Infantry Regiment had three recipients of the Medal of Honor, Donn F. Porter, Ernest E. West and Bryant E. Womack. The 24th Infantry Regiment had two recipients, Cornelius H. Charlton and William Thompson. The 35th Infantry Regiment had three recipients, William R. Jecelin, Billie G. Kanell and Donald R. Moyer. Finally, the 27th Infantry Regiment had five recipients, John W. Collier, Reginald B. Desiderio, Benito Martinez, Lewis L. Millett and Jerome A. Sudut. The divisions patch is sometimes referred to as the "Electric Strawberry".

The division remained in Korea until 1954 and returned to Hawaii from September through October of that year. After a 12-year absence, the 25th Infantry Division had finally returned home.

On 1 February 1957, the division was reorganized as a Pentomic Division. The division's three infantry regiments (the 14th, 27th and 35th) were inactivated, with their elements reorganized into five infantry battle groups (the 1-14 IN, 1-27 IN, 1-35 IN, 2-19 IN and the 2-21 IN).

In August 1963, the division was reorganized as a Reorganization Objective Army Division (ROAD). Three Brigade Headquarters were activated and Infantry units were reorganized into battalions.

=== Vietnam War ===
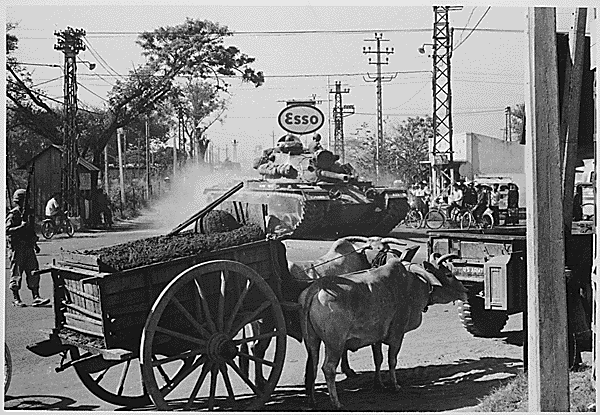
Tank from 1st Battalion, 69th Armor, 25th Infantry Division, moves through Saigon shortly after disembarking from LST at Saigon Harbor, 12 March 1966

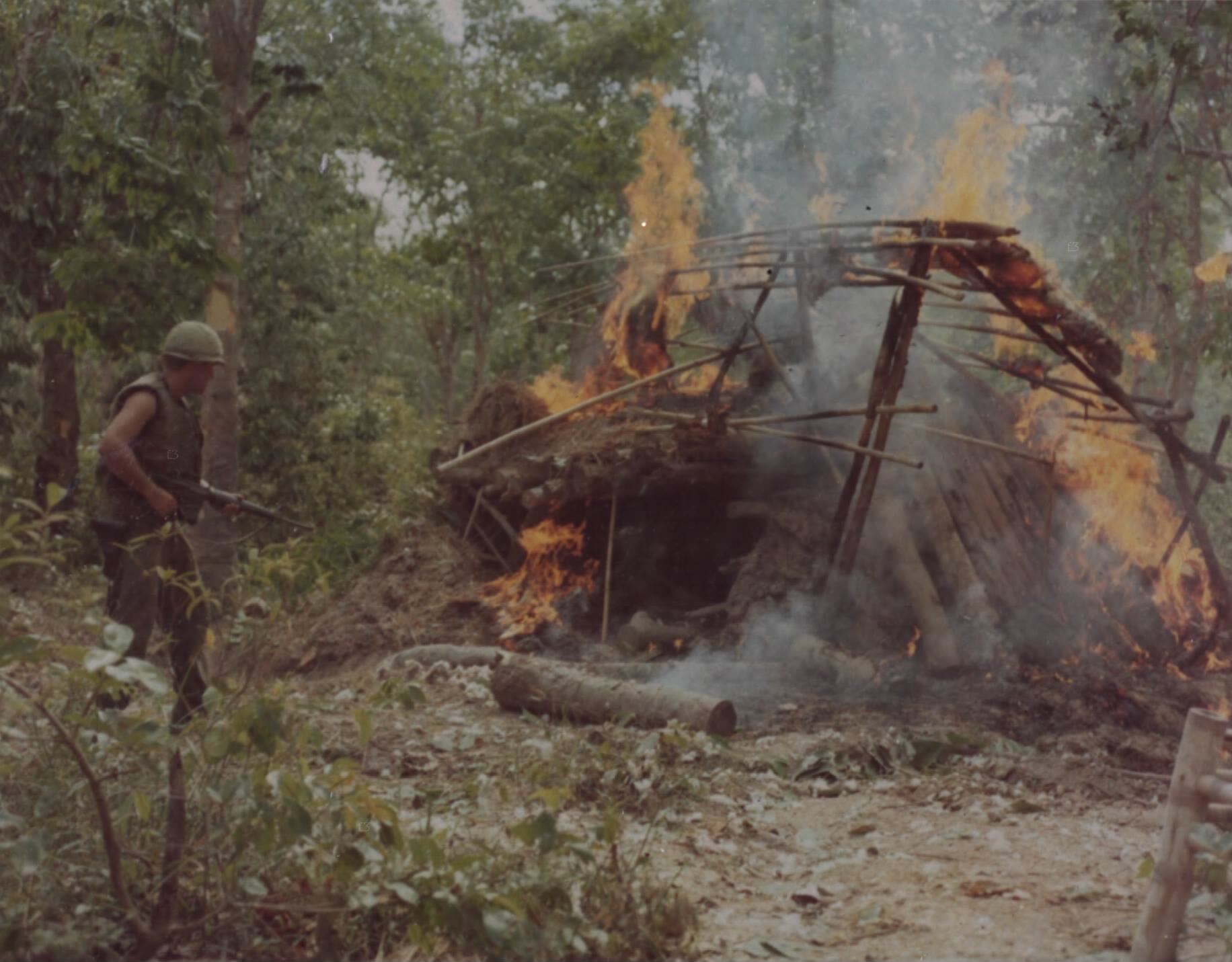
Men of "B" Company, 1st Battalion, 5th (Mechanized) Infantry, 25th Infantry Division set fire to a Viet Cong supply hut during a search and destroy mission in the Michelin Rubber Plantation near Cu Chi Base Camp, 8 April 1966

In response to a request from the U.S. Military Assistance Command, Vietnam (MACV), the division sent 100 volunteer helicopter door-gunners to South Vietnam in late 1962 as part of Operation Shotgun. These soldiers received three weeks of training in Hawaii before serving for twelve weeks in Vietnam. After three months' service, the soldiers returned home to Hawaii and the division deployed in a new batch of three-month volunteers. 1,800 door gunners rotated through Operation Shotgun between the end of 1962 and the end of 1964. By 1965, MACV's door gunner requirement had grown steadily as its helicopter fleet had grown, from 100 men per quarter in 1962 to 340 men per quarter in early 1965, and the command felt the three-month rotation scheme was no longer sustainable. MACV asked that gunners serve for six months rather than three, but the Army rejected the suggestion claiming the longer separation from families would adversely impact morale. The program thus continued as originally designed until November 1965, by which time 2,200 shotgunners had served in the Vietnam.

By August 1965, further division involvement in the coming Vietnam War included the deployment of Company C, 65th Engineer Battalion, to South Vietnam to assist in the construction of port facilities at Cam Ranh Bay. By mid-1965, 2,200 men of the Tropic Lightning Division were involved in Vietnam. The division was again ordered to contribute combat forces in December of that year. Its resupply regiment, the 467th, was commanded by Lieutenant Colonel George S Dotson through the end of the war.

In response to a MACV request, the division deployed the 3rd Brigade, a Reinforced Task Force, with 5,150 infantrymen and 9,000 tons of equipment from Hawaii in 25 days to the Northwest sector of South Vietnam to firmly establish a fortified enclave from which the division could operate. Operation Blue Light was the largest and longest airlift of personnel and cargo into a combat zone in military history before Operation Desert Shield. The brigade deployed its first soldiers from Hickam Air Force Base, Honolulu, to the central highlands at Pleiku. These men arrived in Vietnam 24 December 1965. The 25th Infantry Division had its headquarters at Củ Chi Base Camp, near the Iron Triangle from January 1966 until February 1970. The division was heavily engaged from April 1966 until 1972 throughout the area of operations in Southeast Asia. During this period, Tropic Lightning soldiers fought in some of the toughest battles of the war including Operation Junction City and Operation Pershing.

During the Tet Offensives of 1968 and 1969, Tropic Lightning soldiers were instrumental in defending the besieged capital of Saigon. From May through June 1970, division soldiers participated in US-RVN thrusts deep into enemy sanctuaries located in Cambodia. In these Cambodian Incursions, the division units confiscated thousands of tons of supplies and hundreds of weapons. This operation crippled the Cambodian-based efforts against American units. Following its return from Cambodia to South Vietnam, the division resumed its place in the Vietnamization Program. The withdrawal of U.S. troops was accelerating. By late December 1970, elements of the 25th Infantry Division were able to begin redeployment to Schofield Barracks. Second Brigade was the last element of the division to depart Vietnam. It arrived at Fort Lewis, Washington in the early days of May 1971. Some elements in the 2nd Brigade were originally assigned to the 4th Infantry Division when they arrived in Vietnam. During the war in Vietnam, 22 Medals of Honor were awarded to Tropic Lightning soldiers.

=== Reorganization and light infantry status ===
After its return to Schofield Barracks, the 25th Infantry Division remained the only Army division to have never been stationed in the continental United States. In a time of overall military downsizing, it was reduced to a single brigade numbering 4,000 men. The division was reactivated in March 1972. It was reorganized to include as a "roundout" brigade the 29th Infantry Brigade of the Hawaii Army National Guard which included: the 2nd Battalion, 299th Infantry, Hawaii Army National Guard; 100th Battalion, 442d Infantry, US Army Reserve; and the 1st Battalion, 184th Infantry California Army National Guard. Now reorganized, the 25th Infantry Division trained for the next eight years throughout the Pacific Theater and continued to improve its combat capabilities with troop deployment varying in size from squads, who participated in training missions with Fijian forces, to exercises as large as Team Spirit, where more than 5,000 divisional troops and 1,700 pieces of equipment were airlifted to South Korea for this annual exercise.

In 1985, the division began its reorganization from a conventional infantry division to a light infantry division. The four primary characteristics of this new light infantry division were to be: mission flexibility, rapid deployment and combat readiness at 100 percent strength with a Pacific Basin orientation. Major configuration changes included the addition of a third infantry brigade, an additional direct-support artillery battalion and the expansion of the combat aviation battalion to a brigade-sized unit. With the loss of large quantities of heavy equipment, the 25th Infantry Division earned the designation "light" — the reorganization was completed by 1 October 1986. Training became more sophisticated and more intense. In 1988, the division's first battalions participated in rotations at the Joint Readiness Training Center, Fort Chaffee, Arkansas. This training center provides the most realistic training available to light forces in the Army. Coupled with joint/combined training exercises Cobra Gold in Thailand, Kangaroo in Australia and Orient Shield in Japan, the division's demanding exercise schedule significantly increased the division's fighting capabilities. Until 1993 Operation Team Spirit in Korea remained the division's largest annual maneuver exercise, involving more than half of the division's strength.

==== Structure 1989 ====
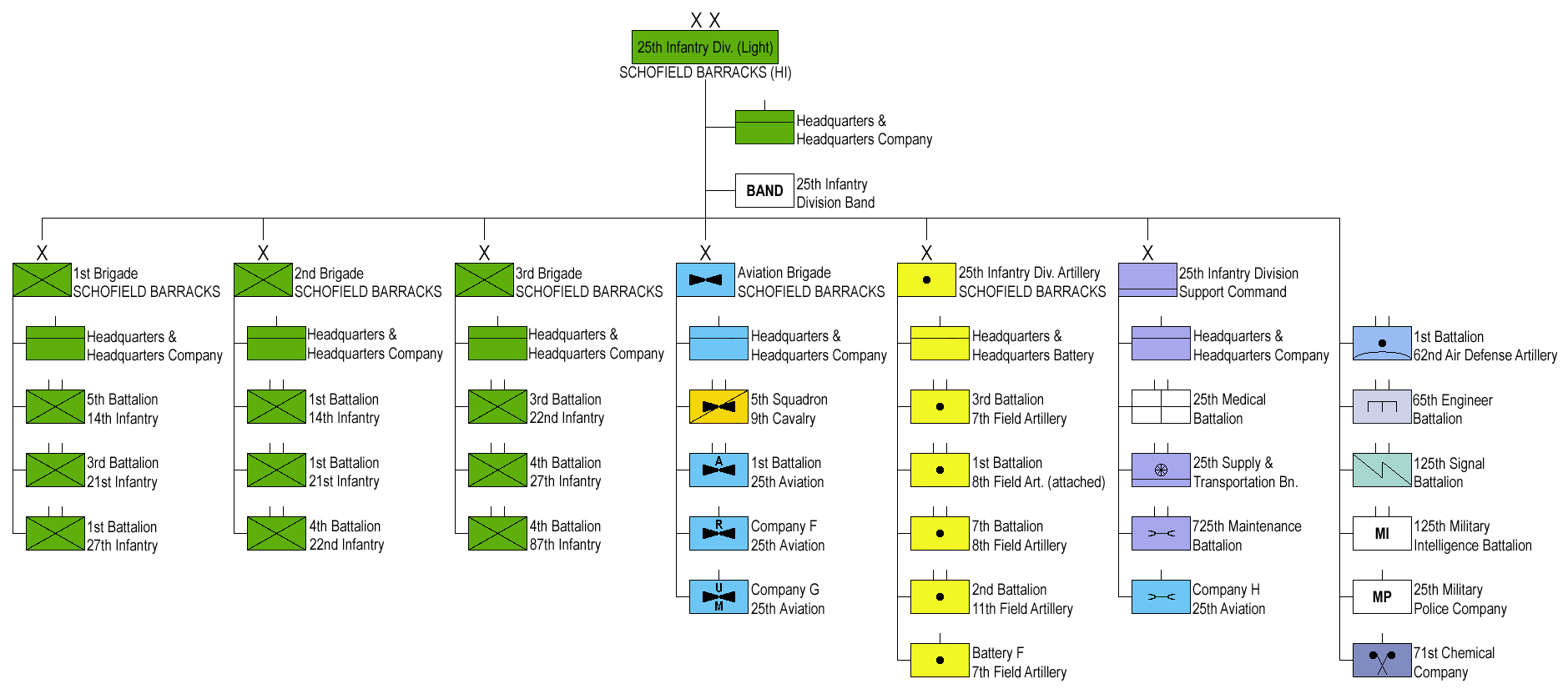
25th Infantry Division (Light) 1989 (click to enlarge)

At the end of the Cold War the division was organized as follows:

- 25th Infantry Division (Light), Schofield Barracks, Hawaii
  - Headquarters & Headquarters Company
  - 1st Brigade
    - Headquarters & Headquarters Company
    - 5th Battalion, 14th Infantry
    - 3rd Battalion, 21st Infantry
    - 1st Battalion, 27th Infantry
  - 2nd Brigade
    - Headquarters & Headquarters Company
    - 1st Battalion, 14th Infantry
    - 1st Battalion, 21st Infantry
    - 4th Battalion, 22nd Infantry
  - 3rd Brigade
    - Headquarters & Headquarters Company
    - 1st Battalion, 27th Infantry
    - 4th Battalion, 27th Infantry
    - 4th Battalion, 87th Infantry
  - Aviation Brigade
    - Headquarters & Headquarters Company
    - 5th Squadron, 9th Cavalry (Reconnaissance)
    - 1st Battalion, 25th Aviation (Attack)
    - Company F, 25th Aviation (General Support)
    - Company G, 25th Aviation (Assault)
  - Division Artillery
    - Headquarters & Headquarters Battery
    - 3rd Battalion, 7th Field Artillery (18 × M102 105 mm towed howitzer)
    - 1st Battalion, 8th Field Artillery (attached 18 × M198 155 mm towed howitzer unit)
    - 7th Battalion, 8th Field Artillery (18 × M102 105 mm towed howitzer)
    - 2nd Battalion, 11th Field Artillery (18 × M102 105 mm towed howitzer)
    - Battery F, 7th Field Artillery (8 × M198 155 mm towed howitzer)
  - Division Support Command
    - Headquarters & Headquarters Company
    - 25th Medical Battalion
    - 25th Supply & Transportation Battalion
    - 725th Maintenance Battalion
    - Company H, 25th Aviation (Aviation Intermediate Maintenance)
  - 1st Battalion, 62nd Air Defense Artillery
  - 65th Engineer Battalion
  - 125th Signal Battalion
  - 125th Military Intelligence Battalion
  - 25th Military Police Company
  - 71st Chemical Company
  - 25th Infantry Division Band

=== Desert Storm and the Post-Cold War era ===
Very few of the division's units participated in Operation Desert Storm, due to the division being earmarked for Pacific contingencies, such as a renewal of hostilities in Korea. However, during the Gulf War, one platoon each from Companies A, B and C, 4th Battalion, 27th Infantry, deployed to Saudi Arabia in January 1991. These Tropic Lightning soldiers were scheduled to be replacement squads in the ground campaign; however, after observing their performance in desert warfare training, the Assistant Commander of Third U.S. Army asked for them to become the security force for the Army's forward headquarters. In that role, the Wolfhound platoons were alerted and attached to Third Army (Forward) into Kuwait City 26 February, where they secured the headquarters area and conducted mop-up operations in the city and its adjacent mine fields. Company A's platoon was separated from the other Wolfhounds following that battle to accompany General H. Norman Schwarzkopf into Iraq 1 March 1991 to provide security at the truce signing. The three platoons returned to Schofield Barracks without casualties on 20 March 1991.

In 1995, the division underwent another reorganization and reduction as a part of the Army's downsizing. First Brigade and its direct support units were inactivated and moved to Fort Lewis, Washington, where they were again reactivated as a detached brigade of the 25th Infantry Division (Light). Today the division is composed of the 2nd Infantry Brigade Combat Teams (based in Schofield Barracks, Hawaii), the 3rd Infantry Brigade Combat Team (Schofield Barracks), a Combat Aviation Brigade, division support command, and a complement of separate battalions. As a major ground reserve force for the U.S. Pacific Command, the "Tropic Lightning" Division routinely deploys from Schofield Barracks to participate in exercises in Japan, South Korea, Thailand, the Philippines, Australia and the Big Island of Hawaii.

=== Afghanistan and Iraq ===
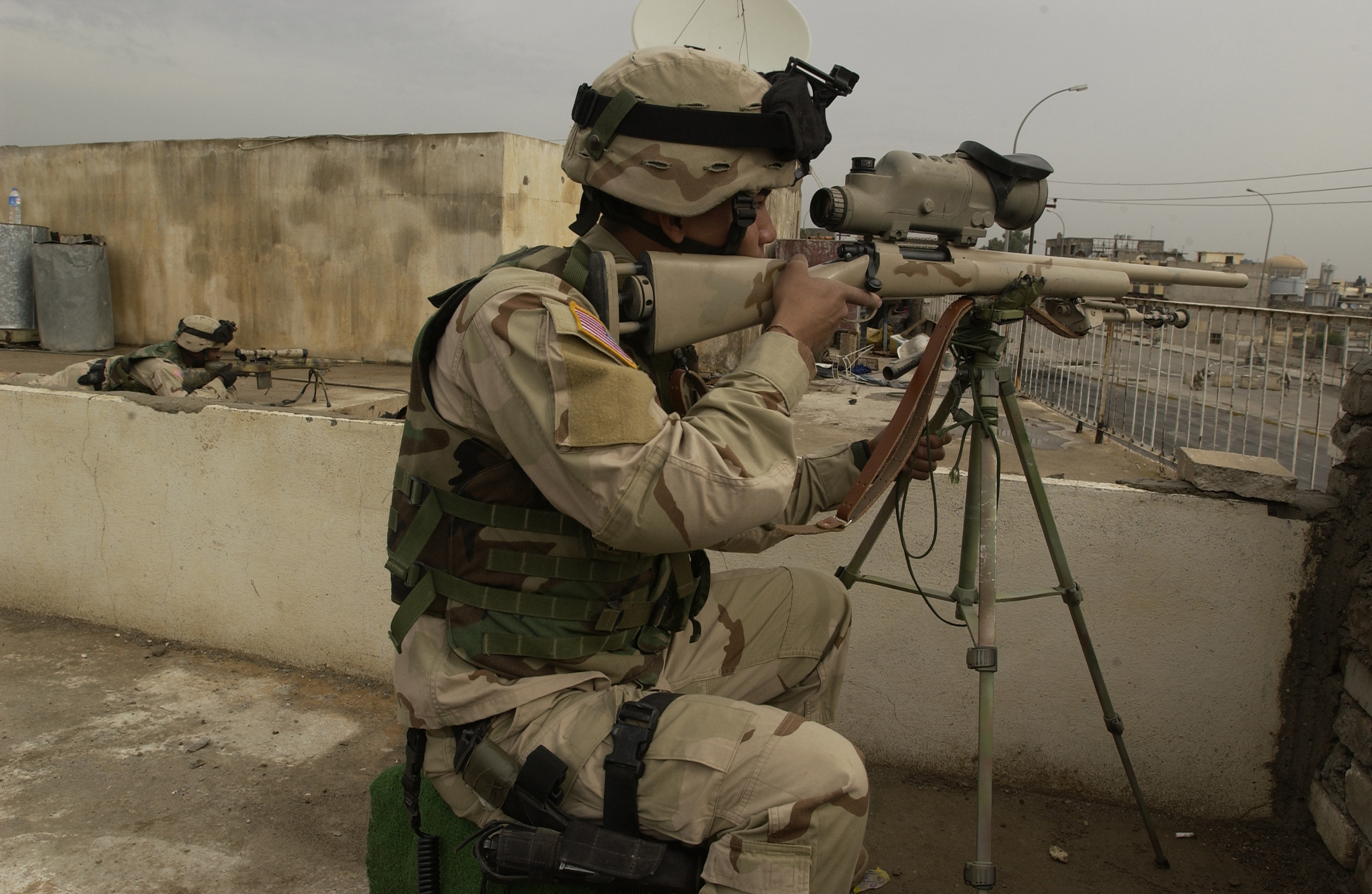
A sniper from the 25th Infantry Division on patrol in Mosul, Iraq.

The division did not take part in the fighting in Afghanistan and Iraq from 2001 to 2003. However, in early 2004, units from the division deployed to Iraq to fight there. The 2d Brigade deployed in January 2004 to Iraq and returned to Schofield Barracks in February of the following year. The 3d Brigade, 25th Infantry Division began deploying to Afghanistan in March 2004. The first element to deploy was 2d Battalion, 27th Infantry Regiment ("Wolfhounds"). They were accompanied by Battery B, 3d Battalion, 7th Field Artillery Regiment. The Wolfhounds operated in the volatile Paktika Province on the border with Pakistan in the Waziristan region. The 25th Infantry Division redeployed to Schofield Barracks Hawaii in April 2005.

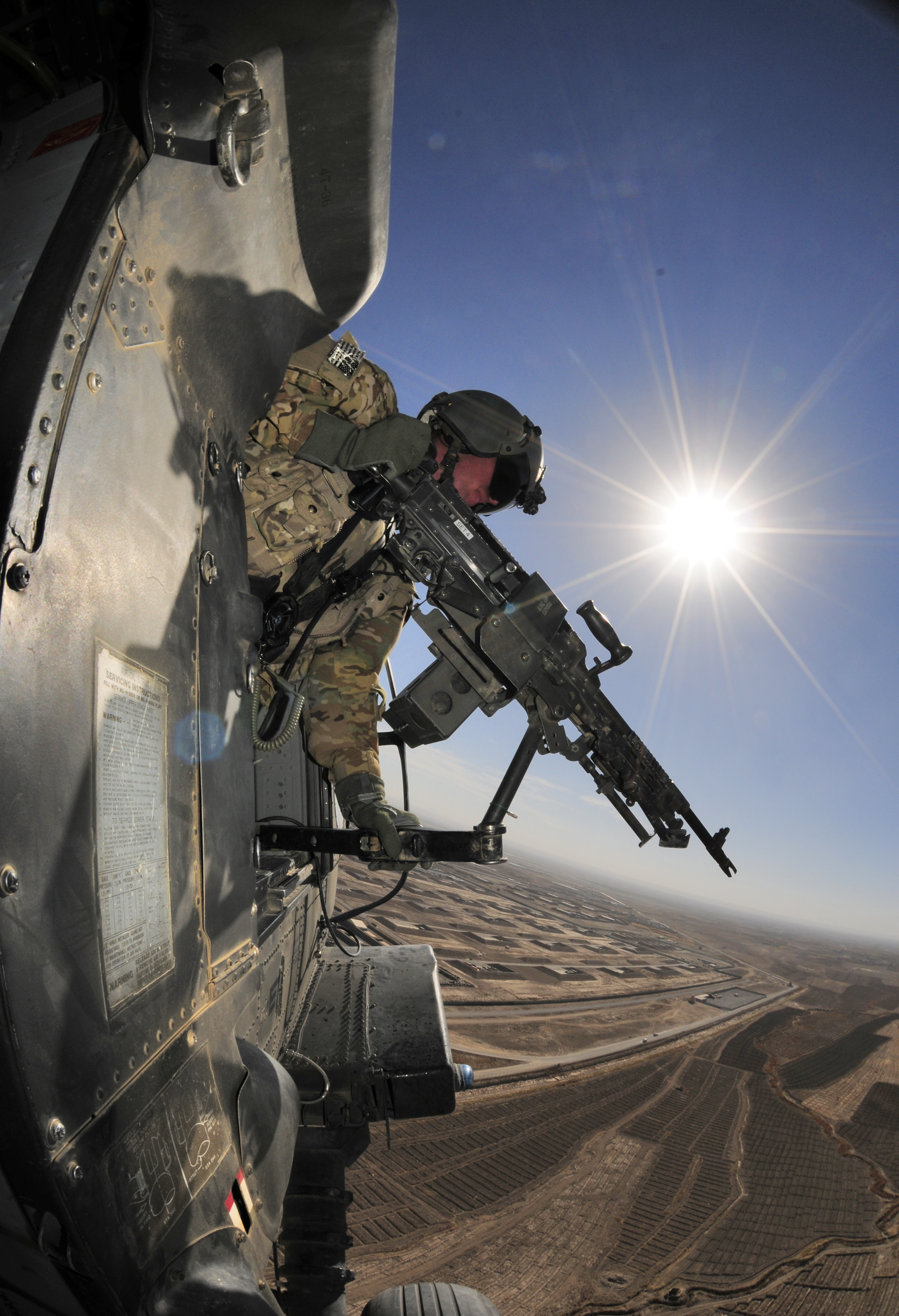
Army Spc. Richard Burton, crew chief with the 25th Infantry Division, provides security in a Black Hawk helicopter during a flight mission over Afghanistan's Kandahar province, 26 Nov. 2012.

The 25th Infantry Division is recognized for the first successful free democratic elections in Afghanistan on 9 October 2004. One of the missions of the 25th Infantry Division was to track down insurgent Taliban and Al-Qaeda members in the mountainous terrain of Afghanistan.

2005-2006 saw reorganization of 25th ID's brigades. 2nd and 3rd BCTs became Stryker and infantry brigade combat teams, respectively. 4th Brigade Combat Team (Airborne), 25th Infantry Division was activated in Fort Richardson, Alaska. The "Light" designation was dropped from the division name in January 2006. On 15 December 2006 the 172nd Stryker Brigade Combat Team was reflagged as the 1st Stryker Brigade Combat Team, 25th Infantry Division. Soldiers of the former 1st Stryker BCT at Fort Lewis, Washington moved to Germany to become part of the new 2nd Stryker Cavalry Regiment.

The 4th "Spartan" Brigade made its first combat deployment in October 2006 in support of Operation Iraqi Freedom, serving for total of 15 months when the brigade was extended as part of the troop surge. 2nd Brigade arrived in Iraq for a fifteen-month tour of duty in November 2007 and was based at Camp Taji northwest of Baghdad. Serving with the Multi-National Division-Baghdad, the brigade was responsible for the rural areas northwest and west of Baghdad with the 1st Battalion operating near Abu Ghuraib. 1st Battalion, 21st Infantry, working closely with their Iraqi counterparts, eliminated terrorist cells and uncovered and destroyed multiple weapons caches. The brigade returned to Schofield Barracks in early 2009.

In 2009, the 1st BCT, 2nd BCT, and 3rd BCT were deployed to Iraq in support of Operation Iraqi Freedom while the 4th BCT deployed to Afghanistan in support of Operation Enduring Freedom.

In June–August 2009, elements of the 25th Division participated in Operation Champion Sword.

December 2010 saw the division headquarters and headquarters battalion (HHBN) deploy to Baghdad Iraq to become the last division headquarters in Iraq. "Task Force Lightning" simultaneously advised and assisted Iraqi security forces, pursued insurgents, and prepared bases and equipment for transfer to Iraqi authorities. On 18 December 2011 the Division Headquarters completed its retrograde, training and security mission and redeployed back to Schofield Barracks Hawaii.

In April 2011, 3rd "Bronco" Brigade returned to Afghanistan for a 12-month deployment. As part of Regional Command- East, 3rd BCT assumed responsibility for security and stability operations for Nangarhar, Kunar and Nuristan provinces located along the border with Pakistan. 1st Brigade followed in May 2011, deploying for 12 months to Kandahar Province. Partnered with the Afghan forces, the brigade conducted offensive operations that resulted in a major reduction of insurgent attacks in the province. In December 2011, the 4th BCT returned to Afghanistan for second time. The brigade was operated in Paktika and Khost Province near the eastern border of Afghanistan. In October 2012, the 4th BCT officially ended its 9-month deployment turning over operational responsibility to the 3rd Brigade Combat Team, 101st Airborne Division.

The Combat Aviation Brigade, 25th Infantry Division was also in Afghanistan, from 1 January 2012 to 1 January 2013. The CAB operated in several key regions of Afghanistan, executing missions ranging from air assault to air movement, resupply and counterinsurgency operations. The CAB's Company F (Pathfinder), 2d Battalion, 25th Aviation Regiment, was on the ground conducting missions alongside Afghan forces. The Pathfinders conducted air assault missions with the 2nd Afghan National Civil Order Patrol SWAT to cut off the export of drugs into the area and keep the weapons from coming into the province. The CAB flew its last mission on 7 January 2013. The CAB, 3d Infantry Division took over 25th's mission.

In late 2017, approximately 1,500 soldiers of the 4th BCT deployed to Afghanistan as part of Operation Freedom's Sentinel.

On summer 2019, 1st Stryker Brigade Combat Team deployed to Iraq as a part of Operation Inherent Resolve. They relieved the 1st Brigade Combat Team, 101st Airborne Division.

=== Restructuring in 2016 ===
The 25th ID was reorganized in 2016. 2nd Brigade transferred its Strykers elsewhere and became an infantry BCT. The brigade also deactivated its 1st Battalion, 14th Infantry Regiment. In addition, the 25th ID CAB's armed reconnaissance squadron swapped its Bell OH-58 Kiowas for Boeing AH-64 Apaches.

In May 2022, Army leadership announced United States Army Alaska would be reflagged to become the 11th Airborne Division. Subsequently, in June 2022 the two 25th ID patch wearing units, the 1st and 4th Brigades, which were under operational control of USARAK, reflagged to 1st and 2nd Brigade Combat Teams, 11th Airborne Division, respectively.

== Division organization ==
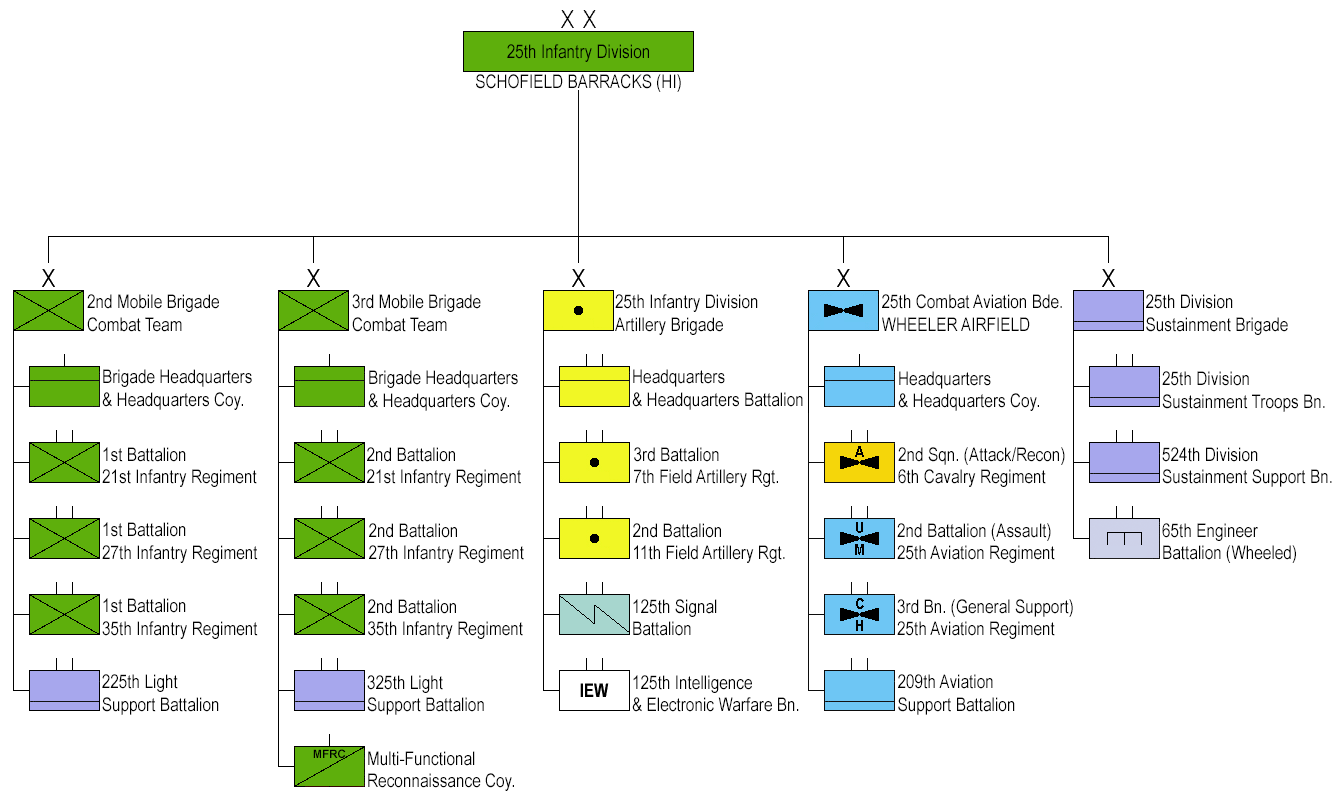
25th Infantry Division organization October 2026

The division consists of two infantry brigade combat teams, a division artillery, a combat aviation brigade, and a division sustainment brigade.

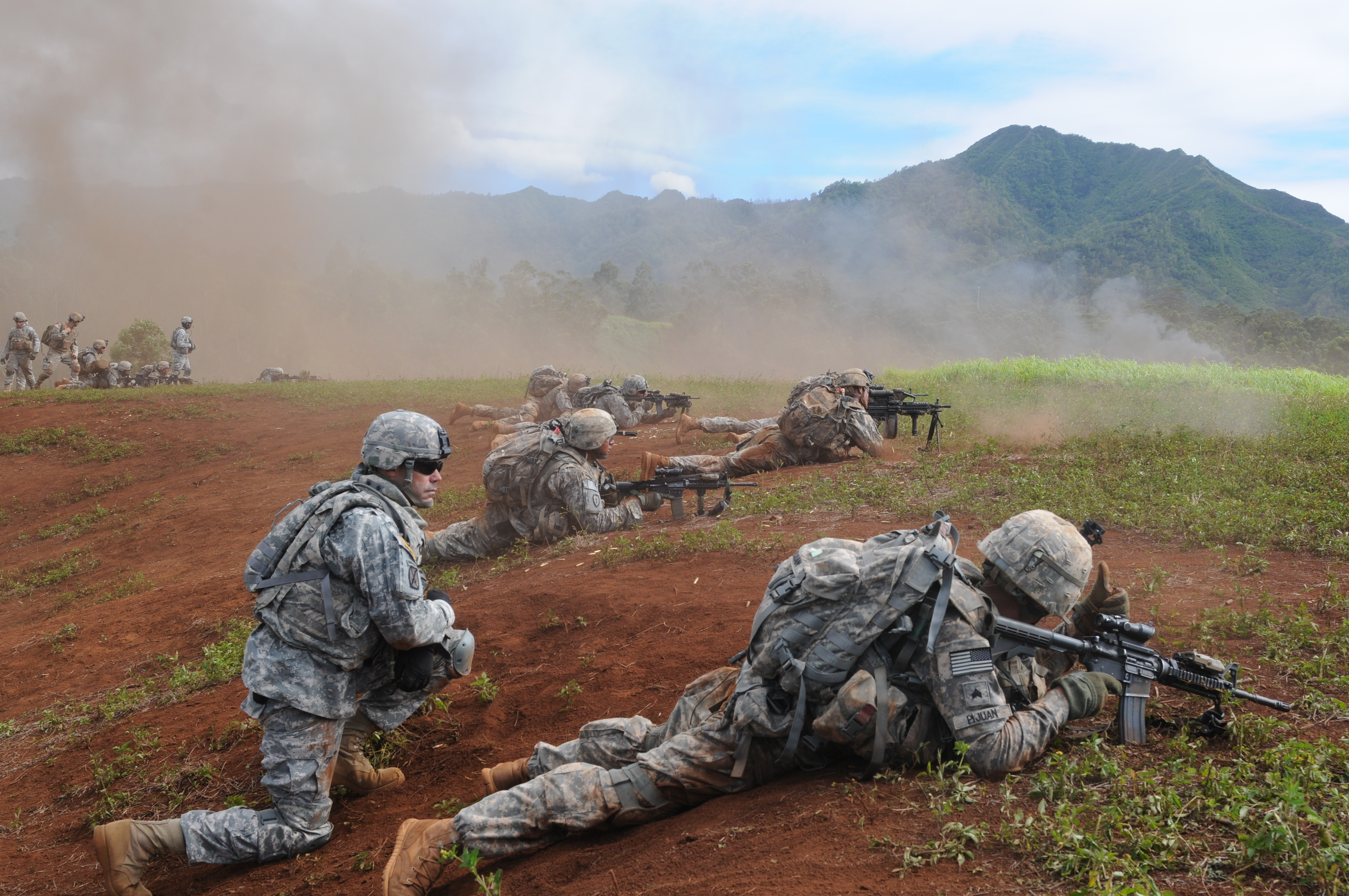
Soldiers from 3rd Brigade engage a simulated enemy during an exercise near Schofield Barracks, Hawaii

A CH-47 from 3-25th GSAB landing on USS Tarawa in the Pacific Ocean

- 25th Infantry Division
  - 2nd Mobile Brigade Combat Team "Warriors" (located at Schofield Barracks, Hawaii)
    - Headquarters and Headquarters Company
    - 1st Battalion, 21st Infantry Regiment "Gimlets"
    - 1st Battalion, 27th Infantry Regiment "Wolfhounds"
    - 1st Battalion, 35th Infantry Regiment
    - 225th Light Support Battalion
  - 3rd Mobile Brigade Combat Team "Broncos" (located at Schofield Barracks, Hawaii)
    - Headquarters and Headquarters Company "Horsemen"
    - 2nd Battalion, 21st Infantry Regiment
    - 2nd Battalion, 27th Infantry Regiment "Wolfhounds"
    - 2nd Battalion, 35th Infantry Regiment "Cacti"
    - 325th Light Support Battalion "Mustangs"
    - Multi-Functional Reconnaissance Company
  - 25th Infantry Division Artillery "Tropic Thunder" (Located at Schofield Barracks, Hawaii)
    - Headquarters and Headquarters Battalion "Phoenix" (former Division Headquarters and Headquarters Battalion)
    - 3rd Battalion, 7th Field Artillery Regiment "Steel"
    - 2nd Battalion, 11th Field Artillery Regiment
    - 125th Intelligence and Electronic Warfare Battalion
    - 125th Signal Battalion
  - 25th Combat Aviation Brigade (located at Wheeler AAF, Hawaii)
    - Headquarters and Headquarters Company
    - 2nd Squadron, 6th Cavalry Regiment, (AH-64E) "Lightning Horse" (Attack Reconnaissance)
    - 2nd Battalion, 25th Aviation Regiment, (UH-60M) "Diamond Head" Assault Helicopter Battalion
    - 3rd Battalion, 25th Aviation Regiment, (CH-47F) (UH-60M) "Hammerhead" General Support Aviation Battalion
    - 209th Aviation Support Battalion, "Lobos" Aviation Support Battalion
  - 25th Division Sustainment Brigade (located at Schofield Barracks, Hawaii)
    - Headquarters and Headquarters Company
    - 25th Division Sustainment Troops Battalion
    - 524th Division Sustainment Support Battalion
    - 65th Engineer Battalion (Wheeled)

== Commanders ==
- MG Maxwell Murray 1941–1942
- MG J. Lawton Collins 1942–1943
- MG Charles L. Mullins Jr. 1943–1948
- BG Everett E. Brown (acting) 1948
- MG William B. Kean 1948–1951
- MG Joseph S. Bradley 1951
- MG Ira P. Swift 1951–1952
- MG Samuel T. Williams 1952–1953
- MG Halley G. Maddox 1953–1954
- BG Oscar W. Koch (acting) 1954
- MG Leslie D. Carter 1954
- MG Herbert B. Powell 1954–1956
- MG Edwin J. Messinger 1956–1957
- MG Archibald W. Stuart 1957–1958
- MG John E. Theimer 1958–1960
- MG Jonathan O. Seaman 1960
- MG James L. Richardson 1960–1962
- MG Ernest F. Easterbrook 1962–1963
- MG Andrew J. Boyle 1963–1964
- MG Frederick C. Weyand 1964–1967
- MG John C. F. Tillson, III 1967
- MG Fillmore K. Mearns 1967–1968
- MG Ellis W. Williamson 1968–1969
- MG Harris W. Hollis 1969–1970
- MG Edward Bautz, Jr. 1970–1971
- MG Ben Sternberg 1971
- MG Thomas W. Mellen 1971–1972
- MG Robert N. Mackinnon 1972–1974
- MG Harry W. Brooks, Jr. 1974–1976
- MG Willard W. Scott, Jr. 1976–1978
- MG Otis C. Lynn 1978–1980
- MG Alexander M. Weyand 1980–1982
- MG William H. Schneider 1982–1984
- MG Claude M. Kicklighter 1984–1986
- MG James W. Crysel 1986–1988
- MG Charles P. Otstott 1988–1990
- MG Fred A. Gorden 1990–1992
- MG Robert L. Ord III 1992–1993
- MG George A. Fisher Jr. 1993–1995
- MG John J. Maher 1995–1997
- MG James T. Hill 1997–1999
- MG William E. Ward 1999–2000
- MG James M. Dubik 2000–2002
- MG Eric T. Olson 2002–2005
- MG Benjamin R. Mixon 2005–2008
- BG Mick Bednarek February–May 2008
- MG Robert L. Caslen Jr. 2008–2009
- MG Bernard S. Champoux 2010–2012
- MG W. Kurt Fuller 2012–2014
- MG Charles A. Flynn 2014–2016
- MG Christopher G. Cavoli 2016–2018
- MG Ronald P. Clark 2018–2019
- MG James B. Jarrard 2019–2021
- MG Joseph A. Ryan, 2021–2023
- MG Marcus S. Evans, 2023–2025
- MG James B. Bartholomees 2025–present

== Honors ==
=== Campaigns ===
- World War II:
1. Central Pacific;
2. Guadalcanal;
3. Northern Solomons;
4. Luzon
- Korean War:
1. UN Defensive;
2. UN Offensive;
3. CCF Intervention;
4. First UN Counteroffensive;
5. CCF Spring Offensive;
6. UN Summer-Fall Offensive;
7. Second Korean Winter;
8. Korea, Summer-Fall 1952;
9. Third Korean Winter;
10. Korea, Summer 1953
- Vietnam:
1. Counteroffensive;
2. Counteroffensive, Phase II;
3. Counteroffensive, Phase III;
4. Tet Counteroffensive;
5. Counteroffensive, Phase IV;
6. Counteroffensive, Phase V;
7. Counteroffensive, Phase VI;
8. Tet 69/Counteroffensive;
9. Summer-Fall 1969;
10. Winter-Spring 1970;
11. Sanctuary Counteroffensive;
12. Counteroffensive, Phase VII

=== Medal of Honor recipients ===
- WORLD WAR II:
1. SGT Fournier, William G.
2. Technician 5th Grade Hall, Lewis
3. CPT Davis, Charles W.
4. Technician 4th Grade Parrish, Laverne
5. MSG McGaha, Charles L.
6. SSG Cooley, Raymond H.
- KOREA:
1. PFC Thompson, William
2. MSG Handrich, Melvin O.
3. CPL Collier, John W.
4. SGT Jecelin, William R.
5. CPT Desiderio, Reginald B.
6. CPT Millett, Lewis L.
7. SFC Moyer, Donald R.
8. SGT Charlton, Cornelius H.
9. PVT Kanell, Billie G.
10. 2LT Sudut, Jerome A.
11. PFC Womack, Bryant E.
12. CPL Martinez, Benito
13. SGT Porter, Donn F.
14. PFC West, Ernest E.
- VIETNAM
1. SPC Fernandez, Daniel
2. 1LT Ray, Ronald Eric
3. PFC Baker, John F., Jr.
4. CPT Foley, Robert F.
5. 1LT Grant, Joseph Xavier
6. SGT Belcher, Ted
7. 1SG Yabes, Maximo
8. 1LT Karopczyc, Stephen Edward
9. 1LT Sargent, Ruppert L.
10. SPC Stumpf, Kenneth E.
11. CPT Pitts, Riley L.
12. SPC Cutinha, Nicholas J.
13. SSG Lambers, Paul Ronald
14. SSG Young, Marvin R.
15. 1LT Warren, John E., Jr.
16. CPL Bennett, Thomas W.
17. SSG Hartsock, Robert W.
18. 1LT Doane, Stephen Holden
19. SGT Fleek, Charles Clinton
20. SSG Bowen, Hammett L., Jr.
21. SPC Petersen, Danny J.
22. 1LT Steindam, Russell A.
23. SPC Copas, Ardie R.

=== Decorations ===
- Valorous Unit Award (Army) for 1/25th (SBCT) OIF III 2005
- Meritorious Unit Commendation (Army) for VIETNAM 1969
- Meritorious Unit Commendation (Army) for OIF 2007
- Meritorious Unit Commendation (Army) (1st Brigade) for OIF 2008-9 (This unit citation was not presented until 30 September 2013 by General Orders no. 2013–63.)
- Meritorious Unit Commendation (Army) for 3rd Battalion 25th Aviation Regiment OIF 2010 Order number 225-09 13, August 2010
- Meritorious Unit Commendation (Army) (HHBN) for OND 2010-2011
- Philippine Presidential Unit Citation for 17 OCTOBER 1944 TO 4 JULY 1945
- Republic of Korea Presidential Unit Citation for:
1. MASAN-CHINJU
2. MUNSAN-NI
- Republic of Vietnam Cross of Gallantry with Palm for:
1. VIETNAM 1966–1968
2. VIETNAM 1968–1970
- Republic of Vietnam Civil Action Honor Medal, First Class for VIETNAM 1966–1970

== Division memorial ==
The 25th Infantry Division Memorial, which is located at Schofield Barracks, consists of four statues. The first statue was unveiled in June 2005. Cast in bronze, it depicts a war on terrorism infantry soldier, representing the more than 4,000 soldiers of the division who have served in Afghanistan and Iraq since the war began in 2001. The other three statues represent the division's soldiers who served in World War II, Korea, and Vietnam.

The war on terrorism statue was sculpted by local artist Lynn Liverton. An active-duty soldier, wounded in Iraq, was selected by the Army in 2005 as the model for the statue. He is shown in full infantry uniform (bearing his surname), looking at a deceased comrade's boots, weapon, and helmet, set up as a field cross.

== Depictions in media ==
- James Jones' 1962 novel The Thin Red Line focuses on a company of soldiers of the 27th Infantry Regiment fighting around the Galloping Horse on Guadalcanal in 1942–43.
- In the 1946 film The Best Years of Our Lives, the character of Al Stephenson (Fredric March) has just been discharged from service with the 25th Infantry Division; his shoulder patch clearly identifies the division.
- The 1953 Academy Award-winning movie From Here to Eternity depicts scenes and troop housing billets of Schofield Barracks, Hawaii, the headquarters of the 25th Infantry Division.
- In Oliver Stone's 1986 Vietnam War film Platoon, the fictional military unit is depicted by its shoulder patches as being part of the 25th Infantry Division.
- The stories in The 'Nam, a Marvel Comics series about the Vietnam War, are about the 4th Battalion, 23rd Infantry, part of the 25th Infantry Division.
- The shoulder patches that the tunnel rats in 1968: Tunnel Rats wear depict the 25th Infantry Division.
- The film Tropic Thunder takes its title from the 25th Infantry's nickname, "Tropic Lightning".
- Johnny Rico based his book Blood Makes the Grass Grow Green: A Year in the Desert with Team America on his experience with the 25th Infantry Division in Afghanistan.
- In Command & Conquer: Red Alert, the American officers in the Allied campaign's final mission briefing have the 25th Infantry's patch.
- In the FX TV series Sons of Anarchy, John Teller, the long dead father of protagonist Jax Teller, and one of the founders of the Sons of Anarchy motorcycle club, is said to have served in the 25th Infantry in the Vietnam War along with fellow founder Piney Winston.
- In the CBS military action-drama series, The Unit, Colonel Tom Ryan and Sergeant First Class Hector Williams are identified as former members of the 25th Infantry Division by the unit badges displayed on their class-A dress uniforms.

== Notable members ==
- Logan D. Coffey, president and founder of Tactical Tailor Inc., served in the 25th Infantry Division in the 1990s. He was assigned to the Scout Platoon.
- James Jones, who wrote the novel From Here to Eternity based on his time served leading up to the attack on Pearl Harbor.
