= Johnny Rico =

Johnny Rico may refer to:

- Johnny Rico Cafe Flesh
- Johnny Rico (Starship Troopers)
- Johnny Rico (author), freelance journalist
