= Donald R. Moyer =

United States Army Medal of Honor recipient

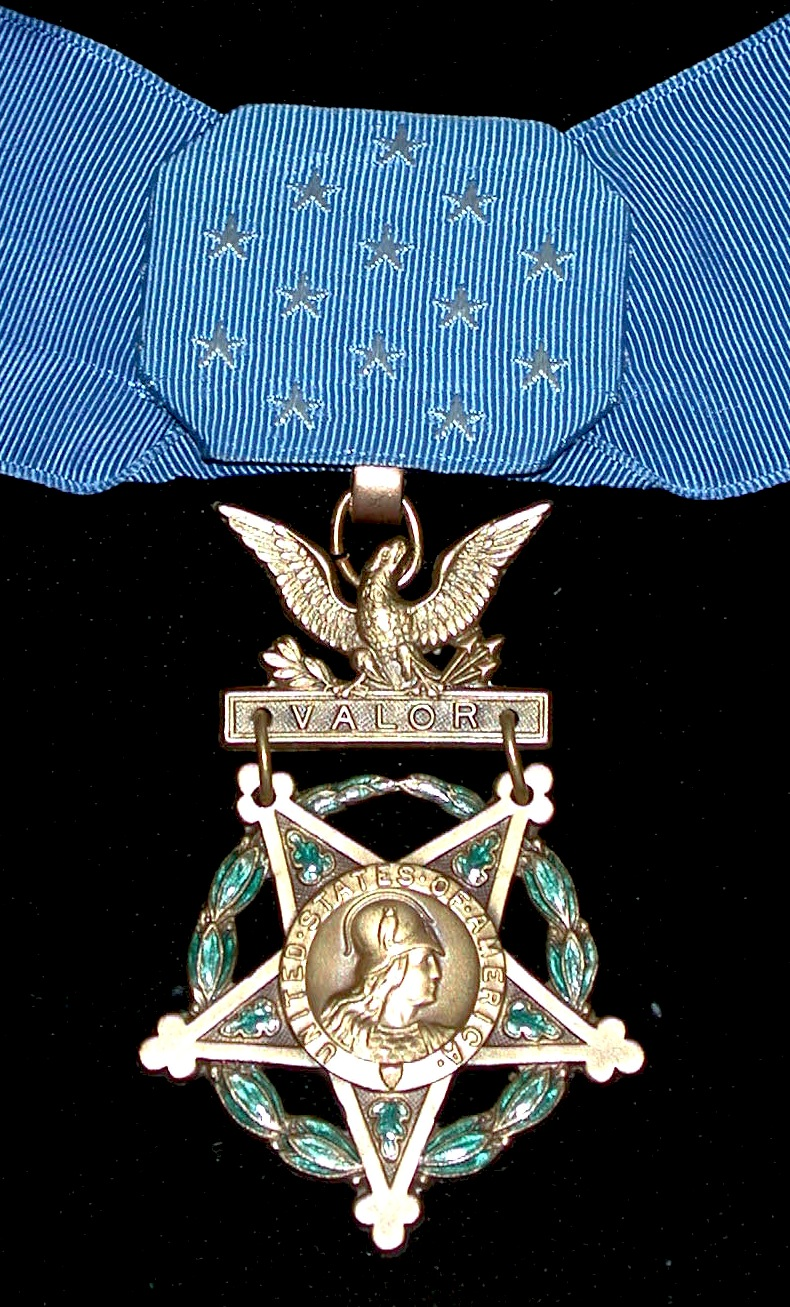
- Medal of Honor recipient
- Born: April 15, 1930; Pontiac, Michigan, US
- Died: May 20, 1951 (aged 21) near Seoul, Korea
- Burial place: Perry Mount Park Cemetery, Pontiac, Michigan
- Military career
- Allegiance: United States of America
- Branch: United States Army
- Service years: 1948–1951
- Rank: Sergeant First Class
- Units: Company E, 35th Infantry Regiment, 25th Infantry Division
- Conflicts: Korean War: UN May–June 1951 counteroffensive †
- Awards: Medal of Honor; Bronze Star; Purple Heart

Donald Raymond Moyer (April 15, 1930 – May 20, 1951) was a soldier in the United States Army during the Korean War. He posthumously received the Medal of Honor for his actions on May 20, 1951, during the UN May–June 1951 counteroffensive.

Moyer joined the Army from Keego Harbor, Michigan in 1948. He died May 20, 1951, near Seoul, Korea and is buried in Perry Mount Park Cemetery Pontiac, Michigan.

== Medal of Honor citation ==
Rank and organization: Sergeant First Class, U.S. Army, Company E, 35th Infantry Regiment, 25th Infantry Division

Place and date: Near Seoul, Korea, May 20, 1951

Entered service at: Keego Harbor, Michigan Born: April 15, 1930, Pontiac, Michigan

G.O. No.: 19, February 1, 1952

Citation:

Sfc. Moyer assistant platoon leader, Company E, distinguished himself by conspicuous gallantry and intrepidity at the risk of his life above and beyond the call of duty in action against an armed enemy of the United Nations. Sfc. Moyer's platoon was committed to attack and secure commanding terrain stubbornly defended by a numerically superior hostile force emplaced in well-fortified positions. Advancing up the rocky hill, the leading elements came under intense automatic weapons, small-arms, and grenade fire, wounding the platoon leader and platoon sergeant. Sfc. Moyer, realizing the success of the mission was imperiled, rushed to the head of the faltering column, assumed command and urged the men forward. Inspired by Sfc. Moyer's unflinching courage, the troops responded magnificently, but as they reached the final approaches to the rugged crest of the hill, enemy fire increased in volume and intensity and the fanatical foe showered the platoon with grenades. Undaunted, the valiant group forged ahead, and as they neared the top of the hill, the enemy hurled a grenade into their midst. Sfc. Moyer, fully aware of the odds against him, unhesitatingly threw himself on the grenade, absorbing the full blast of the explosion with his body. Although mortally wounded in this fearless display of valor, Sfc. Moyer's intrepid act saved several of his comrades from death or serious injury, and his inspirational leadership and consummate devotion to duty contributed significantly to the subsequent seizure of the enemy stronghold and reflect lasting glory on himself and the noble traditions of the military service.

== Awards and Decorations ==
Sergeant First Class Moyer was awarded the following medals for his service in Korea

Badge	Combat Infantryman Badge		
1st row	Medal of Honor	Bronze Star Medal with "V" Device	Purple Heart with 1 Oak leaf cluster
2nd row	Army Good Conduct Medal	Army of Occupation Medal with 'Japan' clasp	National Defense Service Medal
3rd row	Korean Service Medal with 3 Campaign stars	United Nations Service Medal Korea	Korean War Service Medal Retroactively Awarded, 2003
Unit awards	Presidential Unit Citation		Korean Presidential Unit Citation

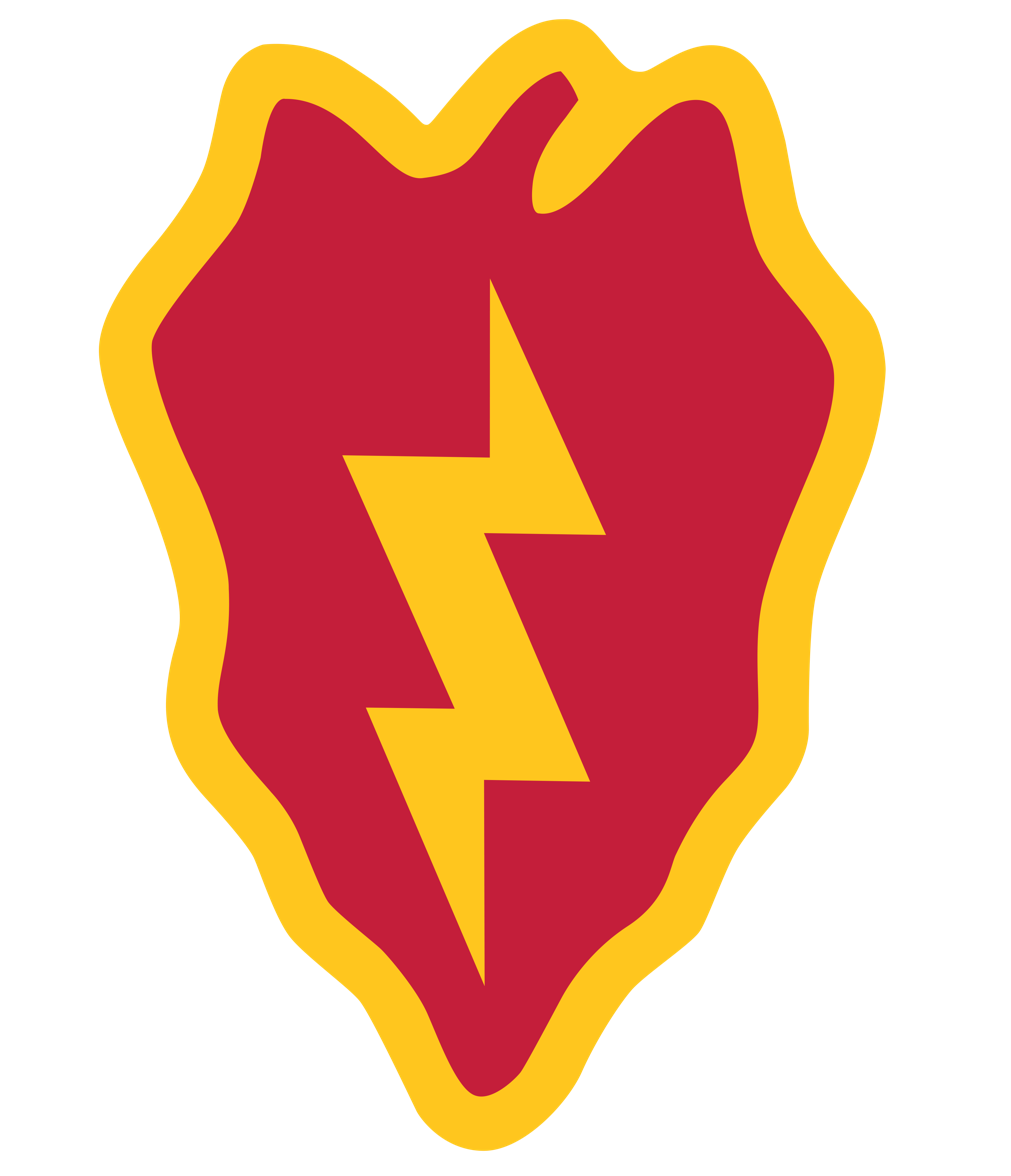

25th Infantry Division Insignia

== See also ==
- List of Medal of Honor recipients
- List of Korean War Medal of Honor recipients
