= Billie G. Kanell =

United States Army Medal of Honor recipient (1931–1951)

- Born: June 26, 1931; Poplar Bluff, Missouri, US
- Died: September 7, 1951 (aged 20) near Pyonggang, Korea
- Burial place: Fairdealing Cemetery, Fairdealing, Missouri
- Military career
- Allegiance: United States
- Branch: United States Army
- Service years: to 1951
- Rank: Private
- Units: 35th Infantry Regiment, 25th Infantry Division
- Conflicts: Korean War (DOW)
- Awards: Medal of Honor; Purple Heart

Billie Gene Kanell (June 26, 1931 – September 7, 1951) was a United States Army soldier in the Korean War who was posthumously awarded the U.S. military's highest decoration, the Medal of Honor. He was awarded the medal for twice falling on a grenade to protect his fellow soldiers during a 1951 battle.

== Biography ==
Born on June 26, 1931, in Poplar Bluff, Missouri, Kanell later joined the United States Army from that city. By September 7, 1951, he was serving in Korea as a private in Company I of the 35th Infantry Regiment, 25th Infantry Division. On that day, near Pyonggang, his unit was attacked by a numerically superior force. When a grenade was thrown into his emplacement, he smothered the blast with his body to protect two nearby soldiers. Although severely wounded in the explosion, he used his body to shield his comrades from another grenade which was thrown seconds later. Mortally wounded in this act, Kanell was posthumously awarded the Medal of Honor nine months later, on June 13, 1952.

== Medal of Honor citation ==
Kanell's official citation reads:

Pvt. Kanell, a member of Company I, distinguished himself by conspicuous gallantry and outstanding courage above and beyond the call of duty in action against the enemy. A numerically superior hostile force had launched a fanatical assault against friendly positions, supported by mortar and artillery fire, when Pvt. Kanell stood in his emplacement exposed to enemy observation and action and delivered accurate fire into the ranks of the assailants. An enemy grenade was hurled into his emplacement and Pvt. Kanell threw himself upon the grenade, absorbing the blast with his body to protect 2 of his comrades from serious injury and possible death. A few seconds later another grenade was thrown into the emplacement and, although seriously wounded by the first missile, he summoned his waning strength to roll toward the second grenade and used his body as a shield to again protect his comrades. He was mortally wounded as a result of his heroic actions. His indomitable courage, sustained fortitude against overwhelming odds, and gallant self-sacrifice reflect the highest credit upon himself, the infantry, and the U.S. Army.

== See also ==
- List of Korean War Medal of Honor recipients
