= Harris W. Hollis =

United States Army general

Harris Whitton Hollis
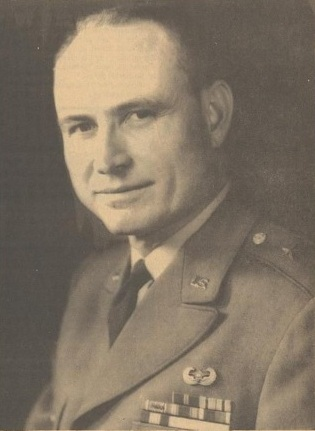
- Hollis as a brigadier general in 1967
- Born: 25 June 1919; Richburg, South Carolina
- Died: 21 March 1999 (aged 79)
- Burial place: Arlington National Cemetery
- Military career
- Branch: United States Army
- Service years: 1942–1974
- Rank: Lieutenant general
- Commands: 25th Infantry Division; 9th Infantry Division; 2nd Brigade, 3rd Infantry Division; 1st Battalion, 19th Infantry Regiment; Company C, 326th Glider Infantry Regiment
- Conflicts: World War II; Vietnam War
- Awards: Distinguished Service Medal (2); Legion of Merit; Distinguished Flying Cross; Bronze Star; Air Medal (12)

Lieutenant General Harris Whitton Hollis (25 June 1919 – 21 March 1999) was a United States Army officer who served in World War II and the Vietnam War.

== Early life ==
Hollis was born in Richburg, South Carolina. He graduated from Oakley Hall High School in 1936 and from Clemson University in 1942.

== Military career ==
He was commissioned as a Second lieutenant of infantry in the Army Reserve.

During World War II he commanded Company C, 326th Glider Infantry Regiment. He saw action in southern France and the Rhineland. He was integrated into the regular army in 1947. He attended the Officers Advanced Course at the Infantry School in 1948 moving to far East Command in 1949 where he served in intelligence activities of GHQ, Far East Command.

He returned to the United States in 1952 and attended the Command and General Staff College at Fort Leavenworth. From 1953 until July 1956 he served as staff officer with the Directorate of Strategic Plans, Office of the Deputy Chief of Staff for Military Operations, Headquarters, Department of the Army.

During late 1956 and 1957 he served in South Korea first as Regimental Executive Officer and later as Commanding Officer, 1st Battalion, 19th Infantry Regiment.

In 1958 he attended the Armed Forces Staff College at Norfolk, Virginia. From there he was assigned as a Military Assistant to the Assistant Secretary of the Army and later in 1961 in the same capacity to the Under Secretary of the Army. He attended the 1961-2 course in Naval Warfare at the Naval War College in Newport, Rhode Island. In August 1962 he was assigned to United States Army Europe (USAREUR), where he worked in the operations division of the headquarters. From September 1963 to May 1965 he commanded the 2nd Brigade, 3rd Infantry Division. In May 1965 he joined headquarters, VII Corps as Assistant Chief of Staff, G-3.

Returning to the United States in March 1966 he was assigned as deputy director for Readiness, Office of the Deputy Chief of Staff for Operations and in June 1967 assumed duties as Director of Operations.

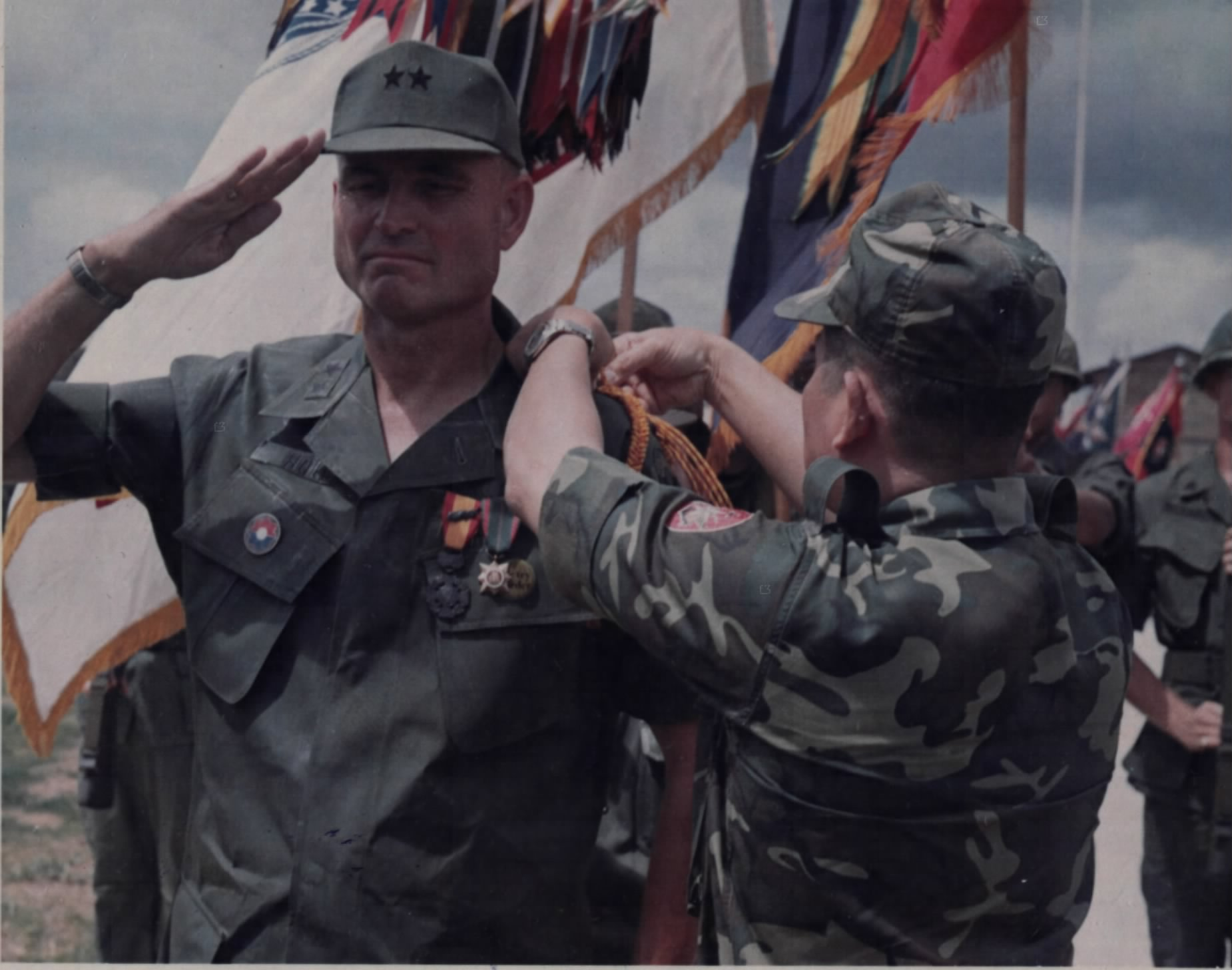
Hollis is decorated with South Vietnamese awards, 5 July 1969

In November 1968 he became Deputy Commanding General, I Field Force, Vietnam and on 2 April 1969 assumed command of the 9th Infantry Division. Upon redeployment of the 9th Infantry Division from South Vietnam he assumed command of the 25th Infantry Division in September 1969.

On 20 April 1970 he joined Headquarters, USAREUR, as Deputy Chief of Staff, Personnel. On 1 October 1971 he became Chief, Office of Reserve Components, Department of the Army.

== Later life ==
He is buried at Arlington National Cemetery.

== Decorations ==
His decorations included the Distinguished Service Medal with Oak Leaf Cluster, Legion of Merit, Distinguished Flying Cross, Bronze Star and Air Medal (12).
