= Jerome A. Sudut =

United States Army Medal of Honor recipient

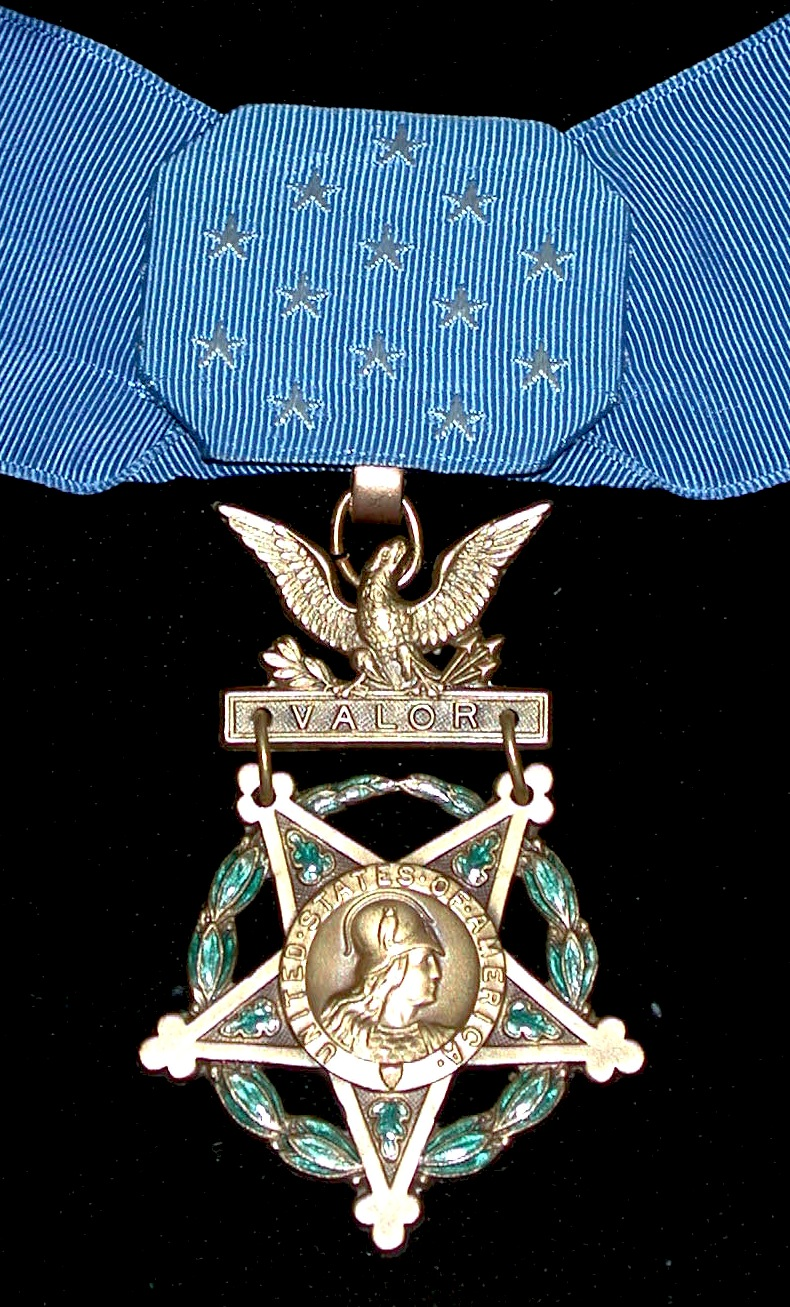
- Medal of Honor recipient
- Born: October 20, 1930; Wausau, Wisconsin, U.S.
- Died: September 12, 1951 (aged 20) near Kumhwa, North Korea
- Burial place: Restlawn Memorial Park Cemetery, Wausau, Wisconsin
- Military career
- Allegiance: United States of America
- Branch: United States Army
- Service years: 1946–1951
- Rank: Second Lieutenant
- Units: 1st Battalion, 27th Infantry Regiment, 25th Infantry Division
- Conflicts: Korean War †
- Awards: Medal of Honor; Purple Heart

Jerome Aubrey Sudut (October 20, 1930 – September 12, 1951) was a soldier in the United States Army during the Korean War. He posthumously received the Medal of Honor for his actions on September 12, 1951, during the Battle of Heartbreak Ridge.

Sudut joined the Army in 1946, at age 16. He received a battlefield commission in July 1951.

== Medal of Honor citation ==
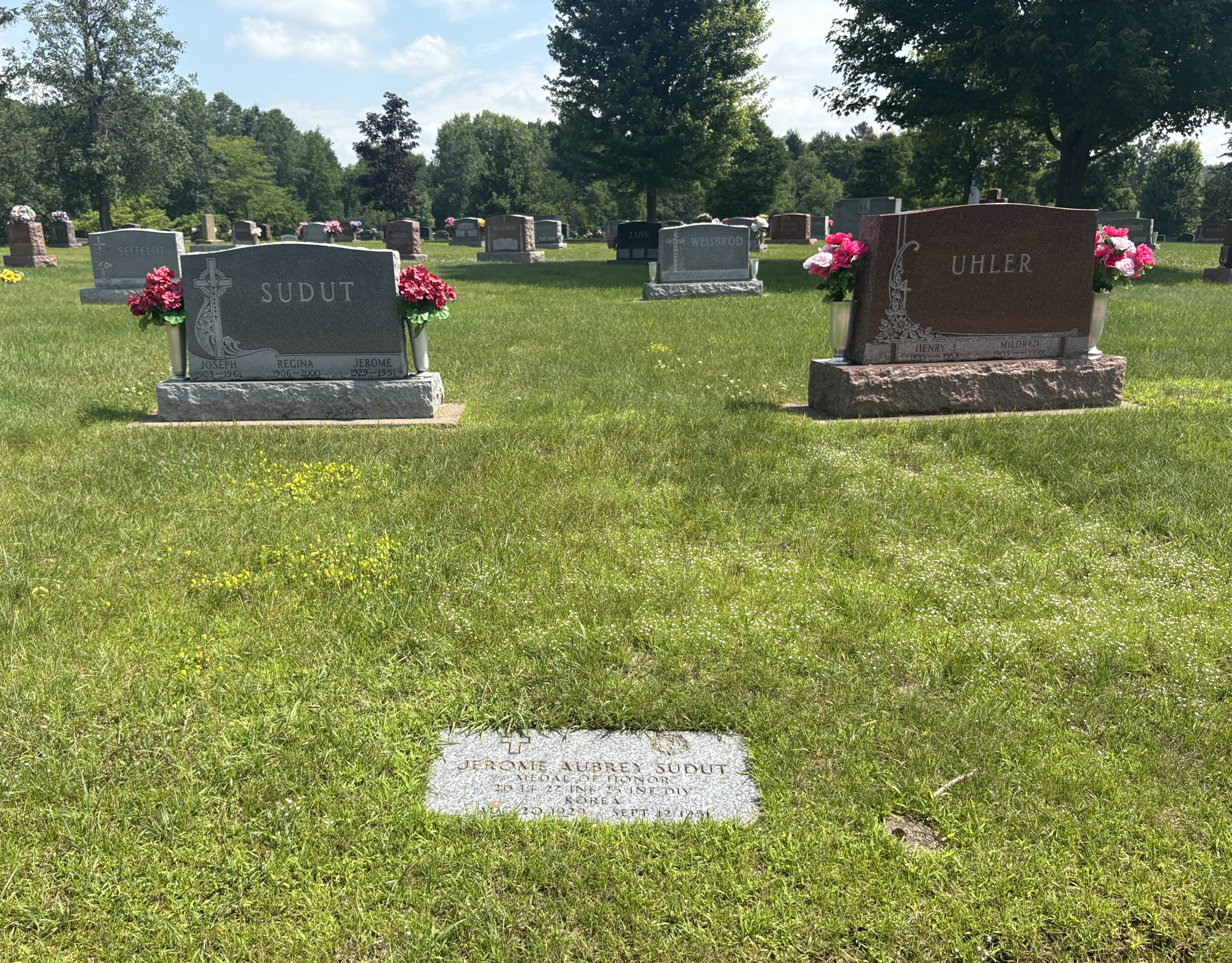
Sudut's grave at Restlawn Memorial Park, Wausau

Rank and organization: Second Lieutenant, U.S. Army, Company B, 27th Infantry Regiment, 25th Infantry Division

Place and date: Near Kumhwa, Korea, September 12, 1951

Entered service at: Wisconsin. Birth: Wausau, Wisconsin

G.O. No.: 31, March 21, 1952

Citation:

2d Lt. Sudut distinguished himself by conspicuous gallantry above and beyond the call of duty in action against the enemy. His platoon, attacking heavily fortified and strategically located hostile emplacements, had been stopped by intense fire from a large bunker containing several firing posts. Armed with submachinegun, pistol, and grenades, 2d Lt. Sudut charged the emplacement alone through vicious hostile fire, killing 3 of the occupants and dispersing the remainder. Painfully wounded, he returned to reorganize his platoon, refused evacuation and led his men in a renewed attack. The enemy had returned to the bunker by means of connecting trenches from other emplacements and the platoon was again halted by devastating fire. Accompanied by an automatic-rifleman 2d Lt. Sudut again charged into close-range fire to eliminate the position. When the rifleman was wounded, 2d Lt. Sudut seized his weapon and continued alone, killing 3 of the 4 remaining occupants. Though mortally wounded and his ammunition exhausted, he jumped into the emplacement and killed the remaining enemy soldier with his trench knife. His single-handed assaults so inspired his comrades that they continued the attack and drove the enemy from the hill, securing the objective. 2d Lt. Sudut's consummate fighting spirit, outstanding leadership, and gallant self-sacrifice are in keeping with the finest traditions of the infantry and the U.S. Army.

== See also ==
- List of Medal of Honor recipients
- List of Korean War Medal of Honor recipients
