= Kenneth E. Stumpf =

United States Army Medal of Honor recipient (1944–2022)

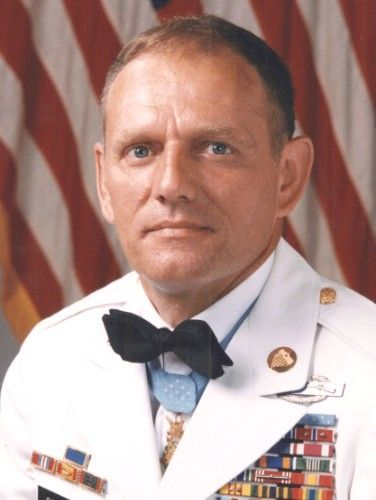
- Stumpf in dress uniform, mid-1980s
- Born: September 28, 1944; Neenah, Wisconsin, U.S.
- Died: April 23, 2022 (aged 77); Tomah, Wisconsin, U.S.
- Burial place: Arlington National Cemetery
- Military career
- Allegiance: United States
- Branch: United States Army
- Service years: 1965–1994
- Rank: Sergeant Major
- Units: 1st Battalion, 35th Infantry Regiment, 25th Infantry Division
- Conflicts: Vietnam War
- Awards: Medal of Honor; Legion of Merit; Bronze Star Medal (3); Purple Heart

Kenneth Edward Stumpf (September 28, 1944 – April 23, 2022) was a United States Army soldier and a recipient of the United States military's highest decoration, the Medal of Honor, for his actions in the Vietnam War.

== Military career ==
Stumpf joined the United States Army from Milwaukee, Wisconsin, and by April 25, 1967, was serving as a specialist four in Company C, 1st Battalion, 35th Infantry Regiment, 25th Infantry Division. On that day, during Operation Baker near Đức Phổ in the Republic of Vietnam, Stumpf rescued three wounded comrades despite heavy fire and single-handedly disabled an enemy bunker. He was subsequently promoted to staff sergeant and awarded the Medal of Honor for his actions.

Stumpf reached the rank of sergeant major before retiring from the army.

== Medal of Honor citation ==
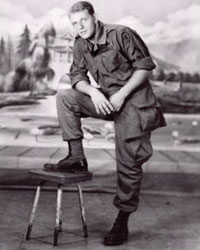
Stumpf in uniform

Staff Sergeant Stumpf's official Medal of Honor citation reads:

For conspicuous gallantry and intrepidity in action at the risk of his life above and beyond the call of duty. SSG Stumpf distinguished himself while serving as a squad leader of the 3d Platoon, Company C, on a search and destroy mission. As SSG Stumpf's company approached a village, it encountered a North Vietnamese rifle company occupying a well fortified bunker complex. During the initial contact, 3 men from his squad fell wounded in front of a hostile machinegun emplacement. The enemy's heavy volume of fire prevented the unit from moving to the aid of the injured men, but SSG Stumpf left his secure position in a deep trench and ran through the barrage of incoming rounds to reach his wounded comrades. He picked up 1 of the men and carried him back to the safety of the trench. Twice more SSG Stumpf dashed forward while the enemy turned automatic weapons and machineguns upon him, yet he managed to rescue the remaining 2 wounded squad members. He then organized his squad and led an assault against several enemy bunkers from which continuously heavy fire was being received. He and his squad successfully eliminated 2 of the bunker positions, but one to the front of the advancing platoon remained a serious threat. Arming himself with extra hand grenades, SSG Stumpf ran over open ground, through a volley of fire directed at him by a determined enemy, toward the machinegun position. As he reached the bunker, he threw a hand grenade through the aperture. It was immediately returned by the occupants, forcing SSG Stumpf to take cover. Undaunted, he pulled the pins on 2 more grenades, held them for a few seconds after activation, then hurled them into the position, this time successfully destroying the emplacement. With the elimination of this key position, his unit was able to assault and overrun the enemy. SSG Stumpf's relentless spirit of aggressiveness, intrepidity, and ultimate concern for the lives of his men, are in the highest traditions of the military service and reflect great credit upon himself and the U.S. Army.

== See also ==
- List of Medal of Honor recipients for the Vietnam War
