= 35th Infantry Regiment (United States) =

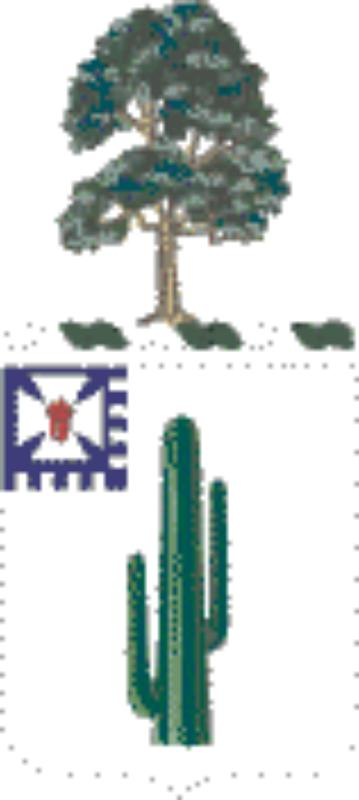
- Coat of arms
- Active: 1916-present
- Country: United States
- Branch: United States Army
- Type: Light infantry
- Garrison/HQ: 1st Battalion, Schofield Barracks, Hawaii 2nd Battalion, Schofield Barracks, Hawaii
- Nickname: "Cacti" (special designation)
- Motto: Take Arms!
- Engagements: Mexican Border War; World War II; Korean War; Vietnam War; Afghanistan Campaign; Iraq Campaign
- Decorations: Presidential Unit Citation (2); Valorous Unit Award; Meritorious Unit Commendation (4); Philippine Presidential Unit Citation; Republic of Korea Presidential Unit Citation (3)

Commanders
- Notable commanders: Gerald C. Kelleher

Insignia
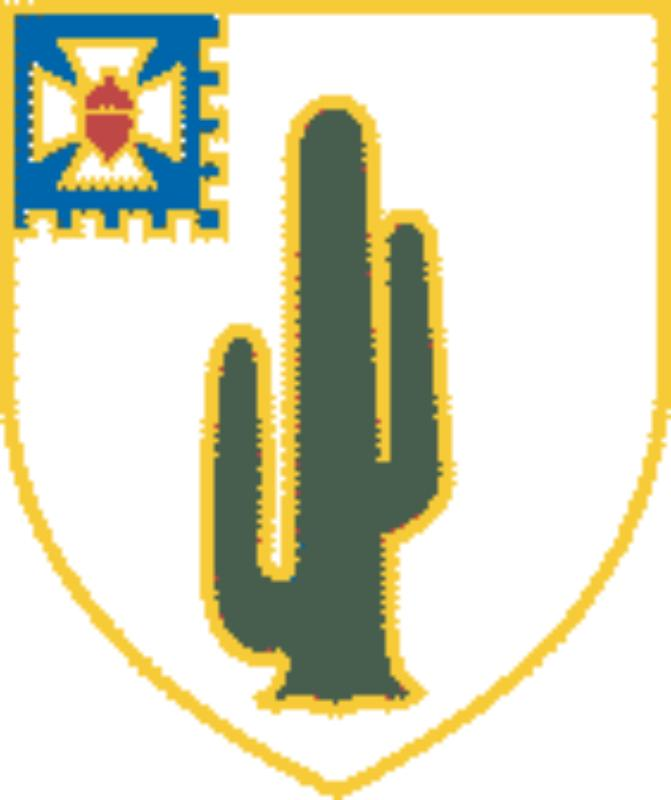
- Distinctive unit insignia

The 35th Infantry Regiment ("Cacti") was created on 1 July 1916 at Douglas, Arizona from elements of the 11th, 18th and 22nd Infantry Regiments. The 35th served on the Mexico–US border during the First World War and was stationed at Nogales, Arizona in 1918. It fought a border skirmish on 27 August 1918 during the Battle of Ambos Nogales.

In World War II, Korea, and Vietnam it served as part of the 25th Infantry (Tropic Lightning) Division.

As of 2012, the only active element of the regiment is the 2nd Battalion, which is assigned to the 3rd Brigade Combat Team (Infantry), 25th Infantry Division.

In October 2025, the 1st Battalion was activated and assigned to the 2nd Mobile Brigade Combat Team, 25th Infantry Division.

== Heraldry ==
The regiment's coat of arms and its distinctive unit insignia reflect its history. The regiment was originally formed in Arizona from elements of the 11th, 18th, and 22nd Infantry Regiments. These organizations are represented on the canton of the crest, in the upper left-hand corner. The white Maltese cross represents the 11th Regiment, the red acorn represents the 18th Regiment, and the embattled partition line of the canton represents the 22nd Regiment. The cactus represents the original service along the Mexico–US border against the revolutionaries of General Francisco Villa.

=== Distinctive unit insignia ===
The following is a direct quote from the US Army The Institute of Heraldry regarding the 35th Regiment.

Description/blazon
A gold color metal and enamel device 1 1/16 inches (2.7 cm) in height overall consisting of a shield blazoned: Argent, a giant cactus Vert. On a canton embattled (for the 22nd Infantry) Azure, a cross patée of the field (for the 11th Infantry) charged with an acorn Gules (for the 18th Infantry).

Symbolism
This regiment was originally organized in Arizona with personnel from the 11th, 18th and 22nd Infantry. These organizations are shown on the canton. During the Civil War the predecessor of the 11th Infantry was in the 2nd Division, V Corps, the badge of which was a white Maltese cross; the 18th Infantry was in the 1st Division, XIV Corps, with a red acorn as the badge. The 22nd Infantry is represented by the embattled partition line of the canton. The cactus represents the original service of the 35th Infantry on the Mexico–US border.

Background
The distinctive unit insignia was originally approved on 28 Jun 1923. It was amended to change the method of wear on 30 Apr 1926.

=== Coat of arms ===
The following is a direct quote from the US Army The Institute of Heraldry regarding the 35th Regiment.

Description/Blazon
Shield
Argent, a giant cactus Vert. On a canton embattled (for the 22nd Infantry) Azure, a cross patée of the field (for the 11th Infantry) charged with an acorn Gules (for the 18th Infantry).
Crest
On a wreath of the colors (Argent and Vert) a walnut tree Proper.
Motto
TAKE ARMS.

Symbolism
Shield
This regiment was organized at Douglas, Arizona, in July 1916 from the 11th, 18th and 22nd regiments of Infantry. These organizations are shown on a canton. In the Civil War the predecessor of the 11th Infantry was in the 2nd Division, V Corps, the badge of which was a white Maltese cross; the 18th Infantry was in the 1st Division, 14th Army Corps, with a red acorn as the badge. The 22nd Infantry was originally the 2nd Battalion, 13th Infantry and as such distinguished itself at the Siege of Vicksburg, receiving the name "First at Vicksburg." This is shown by the embattled partition line of the canton. The cactus represents the original border service of the 35th Infantry.

Crest
The crest commemorates the baptism of fire of the regiment at Nogales, the Spanish for walnut trees.

Background
The coat of arms was approved on 9 Apr 1920.

=== Motto ===
The regimental motto is "Take Arms!" During the Battle of Ambos Nogales in 1918 when the alarm went out, officers, non-commissioned officers and soldiers shouted out, "Take Arms! Take Arms!"

== World War I and Mexican Border War ==
In March 1917, the 35th Infantry moved to Camp Stephen D. Little, near Nogales, Arizona. It was assigned on 7 August 1918 to the 18th Division. The regiment was in the midst of relocating to Camp Travis, near San Antonio, Texas, to join the rest of the 18th Division when, on 27 August, at about 4:10 pm, a gun battle erupted unintentionally when a Mexican civilian attempted to pass through the border back to Mexico without being interrogated at the U.S. Customs house. After the initial shooting, reinforcements from both sides rushed to the border line. Hostilities quickly escalated and several soldiers were killed, and others wounded.

The 35th Infantry border post had about 15–18 men, and requested reinforcements from their garrison. When they arrived, they requested the Buffalo Soldiers of the 10th Cavalry. The 10th, commanded by Lieutenant Colonel Frederick Herman, came to their aid from their camp outside of town. After observing the situation for a few moments, Herman ordered an attack on the Mexican and German held hilltops overlooking the border town. Defensive trenches and machine gun placements had been seen being dug there in the previous weeks. Herman wanted Americans there before Mexican reinforcements got there.

Under heavy fire, the 35th Infantry soldiers and dismounted 10th Cavalry troopers advanced across the Mexico–US border through the buildings and streets of Nogales, Sonora and up onto the nearby hilltops. This was done while other units of the 35th Infantry held the main line near the border post. About 7:45 pm, the Mexicans waved a large white flag of surrender over their customs building. Lt. Colonel Herman observed, and then ordered an immediate ceasefire. Snipers on both sides continued shooting for a little while after the ceasefire but were eventually silenced upon orders from their superiors.

== Interwar period ==
The 35th Infantry Regiment was relieved from the 18th Division on 14 February 1919, and was transferred on 16 November 1919 to Camp Lewis, Washington. It sailed for the Territory of Hawaii on 20 September 1920 on the troopship USAT Great Northern. It arrived at Schofield Barracks on 25 September 1920, and was assigned to the Provisional Infantry Brigade; it was assigned to the 21st Infantry Brigade on 4 February 1921, and further assigned to the Hawaiian Division on 1 March 1921. It was relieved from the 21st Infantry Brigade on 14 October 1922 and assigned to the 22nd Infantry Brigade. The regiment's primary wartime mission was to conduct a mobile defense of the beaches and inland sectors of the southern half of the island of Oahu. It was assigned on paper to the 25th Infantry Division on 26 August 1941, with the headquarters of that unit activated on 1 October 1941.

== World War II ==
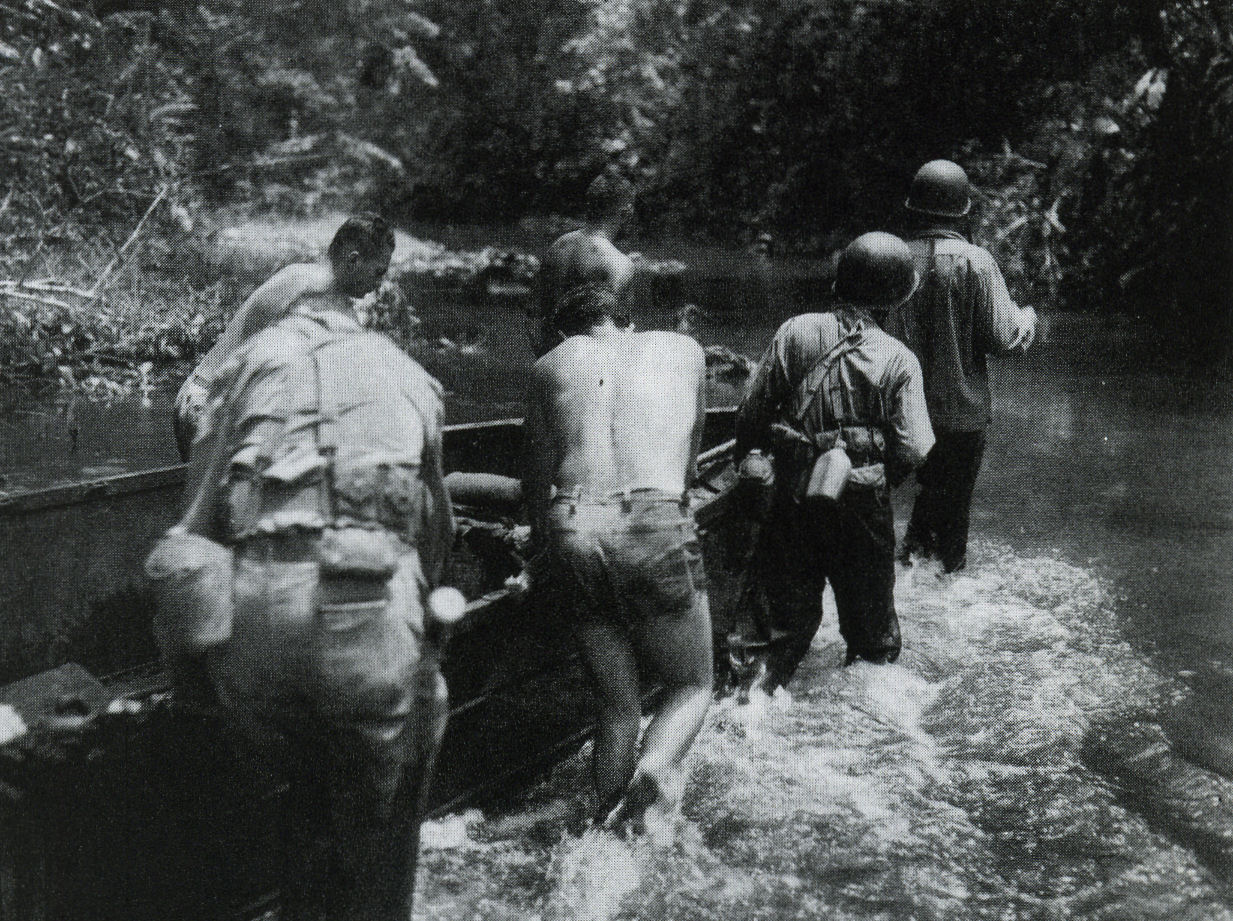
U.S. Army soldiers push supplies up the Matanikau River to support the 25th Infantry Division's offensive on Guadalcanal in January 1943.

The regiment was sent to Guadalcanal, 25 November 1942, to relieve Marines near Henderson Field. First elements landed near the Tenaru River, 17 December 1942, and entered combat, 10 January 1943, participating in the seizure of Kokumbona and the reduction of the Mount Austen Pocket alongside the 27th Infantry Regiment, in some of the bitterest fighting of the Pacific campaign. With other units on 5 February 1943, it helped end organized enemy resistance.

A period of garrison duty followed, ending 21 July: On that date, advance elements debarked on Munda, New Georgia. The 35th Infantry, under the Northern Landing Force, took part in the capture of Vella Lavella, 15 August to 15 September 1943. Organized resistance on New Georgia ended, 25 August, and the division moved to New Zealand for rest and training, last elements arriving on 5 December. The 25th was transferred to New Caledonia, 3 February – 14 March 1944, for continued training.

The division landed in the San Fabian area of Luzon, 11 January 1945, to enter the struggle for the liberation of the Philippines. It drove across the Luzon Central Plain, meeting the enemy at Binalonan, 17 January. Moving through the rice paddies, the 25th occupied Umingan, Lupao, and San Jose and destroyed a great part of the Japanese armor on Luzon. On 21 February, the division began operations in the Caraballo Mountains. It fought its way along Highway No. 5, taking Digdig, Putlan, and Kapintalan against fierce enemy counterattacks and took Balete Pass, 13 May, and opened the gateway to the Cagayan Valley, 27 May, with the capture of Santa Fe. Until 30 June, when the division was relieved, it carried out mopping-up activities. On 1 July, the division moved to Tarlac for training, leaving for Japan, 20 September. At the end of the war the 35th was involved with occupation duty in Japan.

The regiment had three Medal of Honor recipients during World War II, William G. Fournier, Lewis R. Hall and Charles L. McGaha.

== Korean War ==
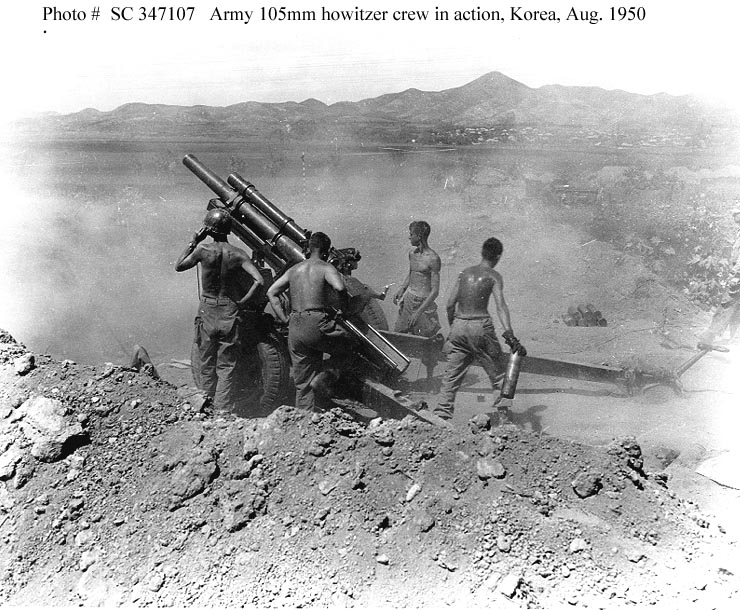
Gun crew of the 64th Field Artillery Battalion, 25th Infantry Division, fire a 105mm howitzer on North Korean positions near Uirson, South Korea, 27 August 1950.

Open warfare once again flared in Asia, now the 25th division's primary area of concern, on 25 June 1950. The North Korean People's Army crossed the 38th Parallel on that day in an attack on the Republic of Korea (South Korea). Acting under United Nations orders, the Tropic Lightning Division moved from its base in Japan to Korea between 5–18 July 1950. The 35th fought out of the Pusan perimeter and was part of the successful drive into North Korea in October 1950. In a sudden and unexpected reversal, however, an overwhelming number of Chinese Communist troops crossed the Yalu and pushed back United Nations forces all along the front. The 35th Regiment was forced to carry out a systematic withdrawal and ordered to take up defensive positions on the south bank of the Chongchon River 30 November 1950. Eventually, these lines failed. However, after a series of short withdrawals a permanent battle line was established south of Osan. Then followed the see-saw battles that finally evolved into static warfare along the Iron Triangle into 1952.

The 35th Regiment with the rest of the 25th Infantry Division assumed the responsibility of guarding the approaches of Seoul 5 May 1953. 23 days later, when ceasefire negotiations at Panmunjom stalled, a heavy PVA assault hit the Nevada Complex, the Division held its ground; the brunt of the attack was absorbed by the attached Turkish Brigade and the 14th Infantry Regiment. By successfully defending Seoul from continued attack from May to July 1953, the division earned its second Republic of Korea Presidential Unit Citation. Again, negotiators moved toward peace. In July, the division again moved to reserve status at Camp Casey where it remained through the signing of the armistice 27 July 1953. Fourteen division soldiers were awarded Medals of Honor during the Korean War, making the division one of the most decorated US Army divisions of that war.

The regiment remained in Korea until 1954 and returned to Hawaii from September through October of that year. After a 12-year absence, the 25th Infantry Division had finally returned home.

The 35th Infantry Regiment had three Medal of Honor recipients in Korea, William R. Jecelin, Billie G. Kanell and Donald R. Moyer.

== Vietnam ==
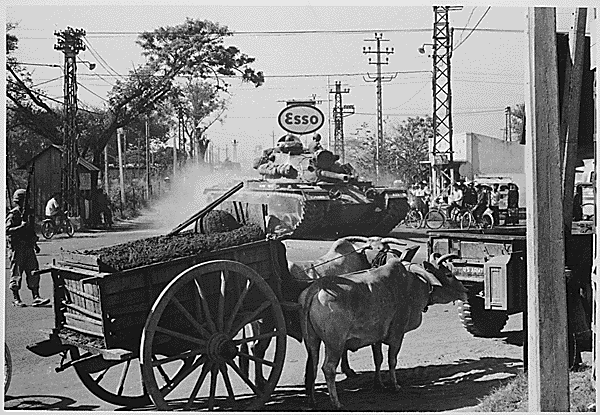
Tank from 1st Battalion, 69th Armor, 25th Infantry Division, moves through Saigon shortly after disembarking from LST at Saigon Harbor, 12 March 1966

In August 1965, elements of the 35th Infantry started their rotation into the Vietnam War, arriving in South Vietnam. The 1st and 2nd battalions, along with the 1st Battalion, 14th Infantry, and the 2nd Battalion, 9th Artillery provided the core combat units of the 3rd Brigade, 25th Infantry Division and were deployed to the Central Highlands at Pleiku. Final units arrived by Christmas 1965. The battalions of the 35th Infantry were heavily engaged from January 1966 until 1972 throughout the I Corps and II Corps areas of operations (the Central Highlands and central coastal areas of Vietnam). In August 1967, operational control of the two battalions of the 35th Infantry and all of the other parts of the 3rd Brigade were transferred from the 25th Infantry Division to the 4th Infantry Division (which had deployed to the Central Highlands in late 1966).

From May through June 1970, the battalions of the 35th Infantry participated in the Incursion operations against enemy sanctuaries located in Cambodia, seizing thousands of tons of supplies and hundreds of weapons. Following its return from Cambodia to South Vietnam, the division resumed its place in the Vietnamization Program. The war was winding down. By late December 1970, elements of the 35th Infantry were able to begin redeployment to Schofield Barracks.

The 35th Infantry had three Medal of Honor recipients in Vietnam, Stephen Karopczyc, Ronald Eric Ray and Kenneth E. Stumpf.

== Reorganization and 'light infantry' status ==
After its return to Schofield Barracks, the battalions of the 35th Infantry became a cadre unit due to the overall military downsizing and was part of a single brigade numbering 4,000 men. The 35th Infantry trained for the next eight years throughout the Pacific Theater and continued to improve its combat capabilities with troop deployment varying in size from squads, who participated in training missions with Fijian forces, to exercises as large as Team Spirit, where more than 5,000 divisional troops and 1700 pieces of equipment were airlifted to South Korea for this annual exercise.

In 1985, the 35th Infantry with the rest of the 25th Division began its reorganization from a conventional infantry division to a light infantry division. The four primary characteristics of this new light infantry division were to be: mission flexibility, rapid deployment and combat readiness at 100 percent strength with a Pacific Basin orientation. The 25th Infantry Division earned the designation "light" — the reorganization was completed by 1 October 1986.

In 1988, the 35th Infantry participated in rotations at the Joint Readiness Training Center, Fort Chaffee, Arkansas. This training center provides the most realistic training available to light forces in the Army. Coupled with Joint/Combined training exercises Cobra Gold in Thailand, Kangaroo in Australia and Orient Shield in Japan, the 25th Division's demanding exercise schedule significantly increased the division's fighting capabilities. Until 1993 Operation Team Spirit in Korea remained the division's largest annual maneuver exercise, involving more than half of the division's strength.

== Desert Storm and post-Cold War ==
The 35th Infantry units did not participate in Operation Desert Storm, due to the 25th Division being earmarked for Pacific contingencies, such as a renewal of hostilities in Korea.

In 1995, the 25th Division underwent another reorganization and reduction as a part of the Army's downsizing, but most elements of the 35th Infantry were maintained.

In early 2005, an airborne brigade was created at Fort Richardson, Alaska and added to the 25th. Until mid-2022 the "Tropic Lightning" Division was composed of the 1st and 2nd Brigade Combat Teams (based in Fort Wainwright, Alaska and Schofield Barracks, Hawaii, respectively), the 3rd Brigade Combat Team (Schofield Barracks) and The 4th Brigade Combat Team (based at Fort Richardson, Alaska), in addition to the Combat Aviation Brigade. The re-activation of the 11th Airborne Division in June 2022 saw the 1st and 4th Brigade Combat Teams reallocated to the new Division, reducing the 25th Infantry Division down to two active Brigade Combat Teams. As a major ground reserve force for the U.S. Pacific Command, the "Tropic Lightning" Division routinely deploys from Schofield Barracks to participate in exercises in Japan, Korea, Thailand, Indonesia, the Philippines, Australia and the Big Island of Hawaii.

== Transformation and War on Terror ==
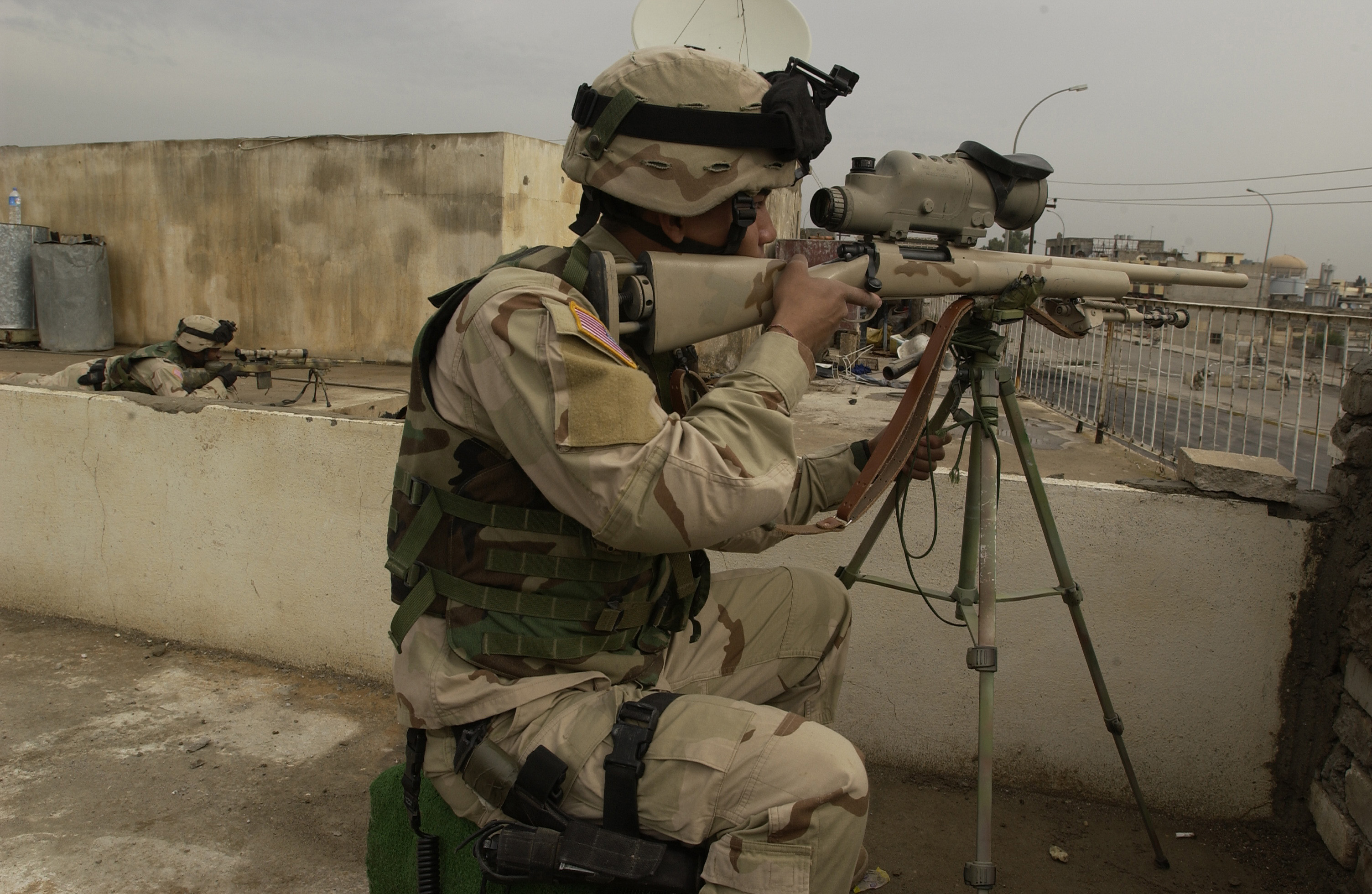
A sniper from the 25th Infantry Division on patrol in Mosul, Iraq.

The 35th Infantry and the 3rd Brigade did not take part in the fighting in Afghanistan and Iraq from 2001 to 2003. The 3rd Brigade, 25th Infantry Division began deploying in the divisional second stage to Afghanistan in March 2004. The 25th Infantry Division redeployed to Schofield Barracks Hawaii in April 2005. One of the missions of the 3rd Brigade was to track down insurgent Taliban and Al-Qaeda members in the mountainous terrain of Afghanistan.

In 2005, the division's elements of the 35th Infantry, as part of the 3rd Brigade, took part in the brigade's transformation into a Brigade Combat Team (BCT). The (Light) status was dropped from the 25th Division designation in January 2006. Also, the term "regiment," dropped at the onset of the Pentomic (battle group) era in the late 1950s, began to be used again for units such as the 35th.

In March 2009, the 35th Infantry, as part of the 3rd BCT, deployed to Iraq in support of Operation Iraqi Freedom.

In June–August 2009, the 25th Division was deployed in Operation Champion Sword.

From March 2011–March 2012, the 35th Infantry Regiment was deployed to RC East, Afghanistan in support of Operation Enduring Freedom.

== Honors ==
The regiment has received the following unit awards:

| Award streamer | Award | Dates | Notes |
|---|---|---|---|
| | Presidential Unit Citation | | GUADALCANAL |
| | Presidential Unit Citation | | NAM RIVER |
| | Valorous Unit Award | | QUANG NGAI PROVINCE |
| | Meritorious Unit Commendation | | VIETNAM 1967–1968 |
| | Meritorious Unit Commendation | | IRAQ 2006–2007 |
| | Meritorious Unit Commendation | | IRAQ 2008–2009 |
| | Meritorious Unit Commendation | | AFGHANISTAN 2011–2012 |
| | Philippine Presidential Unit Citation | | 17 OCTOBER 1944 TO 4 JULY 1945 |
| | Republic of Korea Presidential Unit Citation | | MASAN-CHINJU |
| | Republic of Korea Presidential Unit Citation | | MUNSAN-NI |
| | Republic of Korea Presidential Unit Citation | | KOREA |

=== Additional decorations of 1st Battalion ===
| Award streamer | Award | Dates | Notes |
|---|---|---|---|
| | Vietnam Gallantry Cross with palm | | VIETNAM 1966–1967 |
| | Vietnam Gallantry Cross with palm | | VIETNAM 1967–1969 |
| | Vietnam Gallantry Cross with palm | | VIETNAM 1969–1970 |
| | Vietnam Civil Actions Medal | | VIETNAM 1967–1969 |

Company A additionally entitled to

| Award streamer | Award | Dates | Notes |
|---|---|---|---|
| | Valorous Unit Award | | PLEIKU PROVINCE |

Company B additionally entitled to

| Award streamer | Award | Dates | Notes |
|---|---|---|---|
| | Presidential Unit Citation | | PLEIKU PROVINCE |
| | Distinguished Unit Citation | 1 to 4 Sep 1950 | Nam River |

== History ==
The 35th Infantry regimental history dates from 1916.

- Constituted 1 July 1916 in the Regular Army as Company B, 35th Infantry
- Organized 13 July 1916 at Douglas, Arizona – Constituted 1 July 1916 in the Regular Army as Company B, 35th Infantry
- Organized 13 July 1916 at Douglas, Arizona
- Assigned 7 August 1918 to the 18th Division, and relieved 14 February 1919 from assignment to the 18th Division
- Assigned 17 October 1922 to the Hawaiian Division; relieved 1 October 1941 from assignment to the Hawaiian Division and assigned to the 25th Infantry Division
- Inactivated 1 February 1957 at Schofield Barracks, Hawaii, and relieved from assignment to the 25th Infantry Division; concurrently redesignated as Headquarters and Headquarters Company, 2nd Battle Group, 35th Infantry
- Assigned 19 February 1962 to the 25th Infantry Division and activated at Schofield Barracks, Hawaii (organic elements concurrently constituted and activated)
- Reorganized and redesignated 12 August 1963 as the 2nd Battalion, 35th Infantry
- Relieved 1 August 1967 from assignment to the 25th Infantry Division and assigned to the 4th Infantry Division
- Relieved 15 December 1970 from assignment to the 4th Infantry Division and assigned to the 25th Infantry Division
- Inactivated 5 June 1972 at Schofield Barracks, Hawaii, and relieved from assignment to the 25th Infantry Division
- Assigned 16 August 1995 to the 25th Infantry Division and activated at Schofield Barracks, Hawaii

== Campaign history ==
Campaign participation credits;

World War II

- Central Pacific
- Guadalcanal
- Northern Solomons (with arrowhead)
- Luzon

Korean War

- UN Defensive
- UN Offensive
- CCF Intervention
- First UN Counteroffensive
- CCF Spring Offensive
- UN Summer-Fall Offensive
- Second Korean Winter
- Korea, Summer-Fall 1952
- Third Korean Winter
- Korea, Summer 1953

Vietnam

- Counteroffensive
- Counteroffensive, Phase II
- Counteroffensive, Phase III
- Tet Counteroffensive
- Counteroffensive, Phase IV
- Counteroffensive, Phase V
- Counteroffensive, Phase VI
- Tet 69/Counteroffensive
- Summer-Fall 1969
- Winter-Spring 1970
- Sanctuary Counteroffensive
- Counteroffensive, Phase VII
