= William R. Jecelin =

United States Army soldier

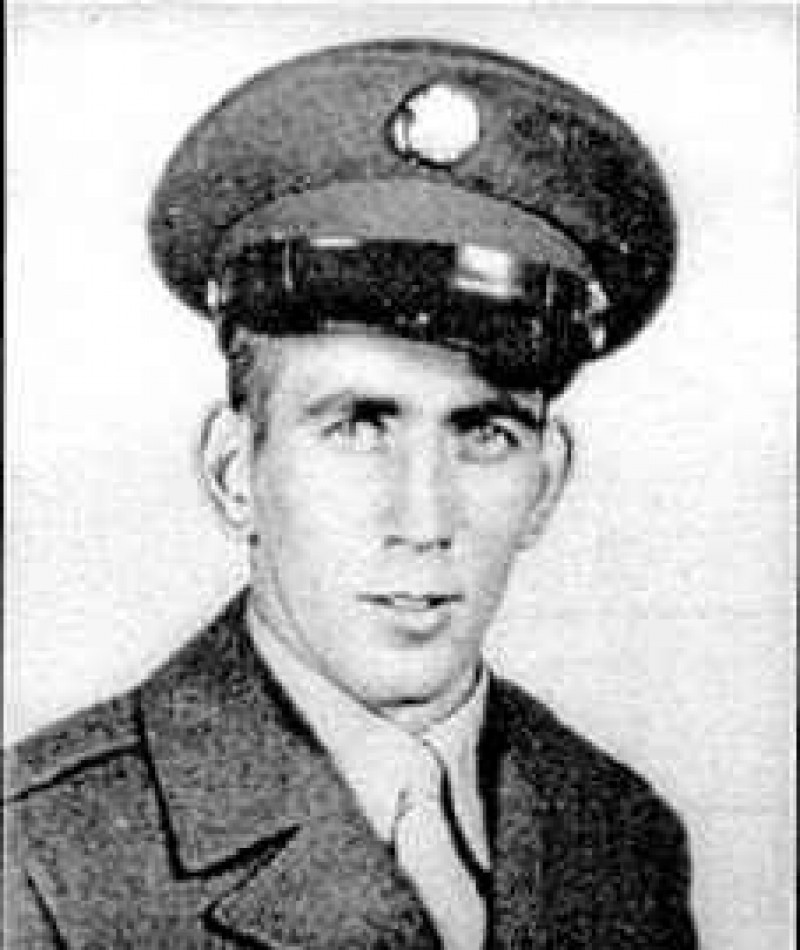
- Medal of Honor recipient
- Born: May 26, 1930; Baltimore, Maryland, U.S.
- Died: September 19, 1950 (aged 20); Pusan Perimeter, Korea
- Burial place: Bohemian Cemetery, Baltimore, Maryland
- Military career
- Allegiance: United States of America
- Branch: United States Army
- Rank: Sergeant
- Units: Company C, 35th Infantry Regiment, 25th Infantry Division
- Conflicts: Korean War: Battle of Pusan Perimeter; Pusan Perimeter Offensive †
- Awards: Medal of Honor; Bronze Star Medal; Purple Heart

William R. Jecelin (May 6, 1930 – September 19, 1950) was a soldier in the United States Army who posthumously received the United States military's highest decoration for bravery, the Medal of Honor, for his actions during the Korean War. He was born in and joined the Army from Baltimore, Maryland and was sent as a Sergeant to fight in the Korean War. While there he was fighting with Company C, 35th Infantry Regiment during the Pusan Perimeter Offensive when a grenade was thrown at them Jecelin sacrificed himself to save the other soldiers in his unit. He covered the grenade with his body and was killed. His body was returned to the US and buried in his hometown of Baltimore.

== Biography ==
William Russell Jecelin was born May 6, 1930, in Baltimore, Maryland and joined the United States Army from that location. After attending training he was sent to fight in Korea as a Sergeant in Company C, 35th Infantry Regiment, 25th Infantry Division.

On September 19, 1950, his company was ordered to secure a ridge that was occupied by Korean forces they attacked as ordered but the first attempt to take the hill failed. They tried a second time and this time Jecelin led his platoon through heavy enemy fire advancing to the base of the cliff where the attack was stopped again due to enemy fire. He determined that a direct assault was the only way to gain control of the hill so he began firing his rifle and throwing grenades at the enemy position, calling to his men to follow him. The American troops were able to make it to the crest of the hill before being forced to take cover from enemy fire, before attempting another assault. They attached bayonets for hand-to-hand combat and were able to defeat a portion of the enemy before being forced to take cover after receiving fire from another group of enemy forces in the area. When they began attacking this new group, one of the enemy soldiers threw a grenade at the incoming Americans and Sergeant Jecelin dived on the grenade, smothering the blast with his body, saving the lives of the other American soldiers but was killed in the blast. For this action he posthumously received the United States military's highest decoration for bravery, the Medal of Honor.

His body was returned to the United States after his death and buried in Bohemian National Cemetery.

== Medal of Honor citation ==
Citation:

Sgt. Jecelin, Company C, distinguished himself by conspicuous gallantry and Intrepidity above and beyond the call of duty in action against the enemy. His company was ordered to secure a prominent, sawtoothed ridge from a well-entrenched and heavily armed enemy. Unable to capture the objective in the first attempt, a frontal and flanking assault was launched. He led his platoon through heavy enemy fire and bursting shells, across rice fields and rocky terrain, in direct frontal attack on the ridge in order to draw fire away from the flanks. The unit advanced to the base of the cliff, where intense, accurate hostile fire stopped the attack. Realizing that an assault was the only solution, Sgt. Jecelin rose from his position firing his rifle and throwing grenades as he called on his men to follow him. Despite the intense enemy fire this attack carried to the crest of the ridge where the men were forced to take cover. Again he rallied his men and stormed the enemy strong point. With fixed bayonets they charged into the face of antitank fire and engaged the enemy in hand-to-hand combat. After clubbing and slashing this force into submission the platoon was forced to take cover from direct frontal fire of a self-propelled gun. Refusing to be stopped he leaped to his feet and through sheer personal courage and fierce determination led his men in a new attack. At this instant a well-camouflaged enemy soldier threw a grenade at the remaining members of the platoon. He immediately lunged and covered the grenade with his body, absorbing the full force of the explosion to save those around him. This incredible courage and willingness to sacrifice himself for his comrades so imbued them with fury that they completely eliminated the enemy force. Sgt. Jecelin's heroic leadership and outstanding gallantry reflect the highest credit upon himself and uphold the esteemed traditions of the military service.

== Awards and Decorations ==

| Badge | Combat Infantryman Badge | | |
| 1st row | Medal of Honor | | Bronze Star Medal with "V" Device |
| 2nd row | Purple Heart | Army Good Conduct Medal | National Defense Service Medal |
| 3rd row | Korean Service Medal with 1 Campaign star | United Nations Service Medal Korea | Korean War Service Medal Retroactively Awarded, 2003 |
| Unit awards | Presidential Unit Citation | | Korean Presidential Unit Citation |

== See also ==
- List of Korean War Medal of Honor recipients
