= William H. Schneider =

American Army general

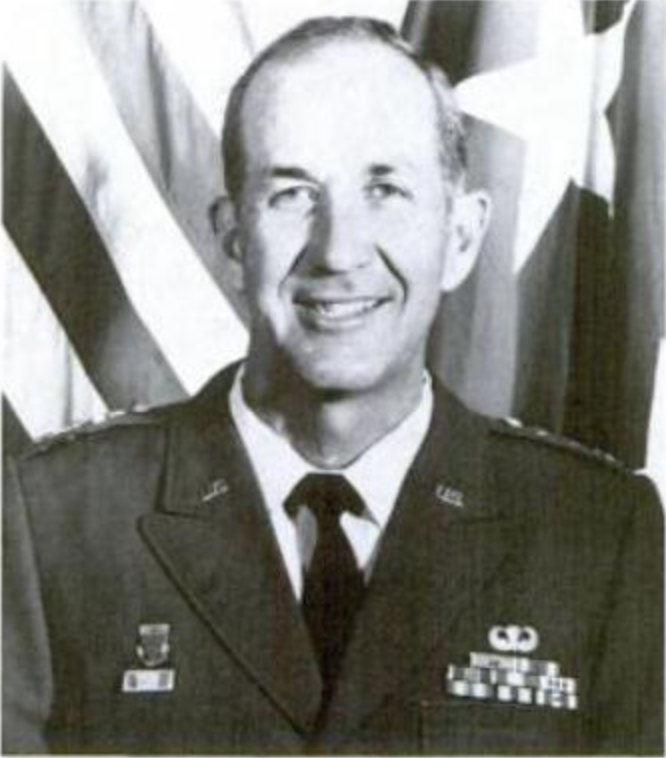
- Born: 29 September 1934; San Antonio, Texas U.S.
- Died: 9 May 1994 (aged 59)
- Military career
- Allegiance: United States
- Branch: United States Army
- Service years: 1955–1989
- Rank: Lieutenant general
- Commands: United States Fifth Army; Deputy Commander in Chief, United States Pacific Command; 25th Infantry Division

William Henry Schneider (29 September 1934 – 9 May 1994) was a lieutenant general in the United States Army who served as Deputy Commander in Chief of United States Pacific Command. He earned a B.A. degree in business economics from St. Mary's University in 1955 and later received an M.A. degree in industrial management from George Washington University.

== Personal ==
Born in San Antonio, Texas, Schneider was the son of Henry William Schneider (19 March 1906 – 24 March 1975) and Irene C. Mooty.

Schneider married Barbara Bristol Carver in 1957. The couple had four children.

After his death, Schneider was interred at Fort Sam Houston National Cemetery on 13 May 1994.
