= USS Tarawa =

Two United States Navy ships have borne the name Tarawa, after the Battle of Tarawa in the Pacific War.

- The first USS Tarawa (CV-40) was an aircraft carrier in service from 1945 to 1960.
- The second USS Tarawa (LHA-1) is an amphibious assault ship in service from 1976 to 2009.
