= Johnny Rico (author) =

Johnny Rico is a U.S.-born freelance journalist and war veteran currently living in the U.K. He was born Stephen Hites but changed his name to that of the protagonist of Robert Heinlein's political science fiction novel, Starship Troopers. His works include two non-fiction books and numerous magazine articles. He graduated from the University of Colorado Denver with a master's degree in criminal justice in 2001 and worked as a probation officer before enlisting in the U. S. Army following the September 11th terrorist attacks. Rico served in the Army for 3 years, including a year in Afghanistan with the 25th Infantry Division.

Rico published his first book, Blood Makes the Grass Grow Green: A Year in the Desert with Team America (Ballantine/Presidio, April 2007), based on his experiences as a U.S. Army Infantryman deployed to Afghanistan from 2004-2005. Critically acclaimed, Publishers Weekly hailed this work as "a timeless story of confounded youth and its eternal struggle for meaning, this book may well signal the birth of a titanic new voice".

Rico's second non-fiction book Border Crosser was published on June 23, 2009 by Ballantine Books.

Johnny Rico has been asked to speak about his book, Blood Makes the Grass Grow Green: A Year in the Desert with Team America, on multiple occasions. One such occurrence was on March 4–7, 2008 when he was hosted by Avila University. His book has also been featured in major national publications such as the Washington Times.
