= Battle of the Samichon River =

Korean War battle

- Part of the Korean War
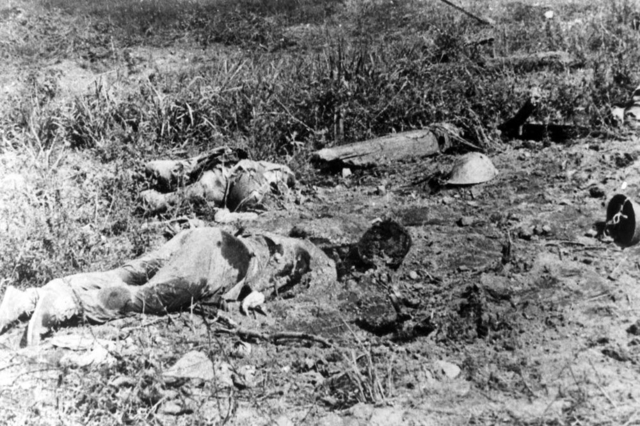
- Chinese dead on the approaches to the Hook, late July 1953
Date	24−26 July 1953
Location	Jamestown Line, Samichon River, Korea 38°1′44″N 126°50′13″E
Result	United Nations victory

Belligerents
United Nations (UNC); Australia; New Zealand; United States; United Kingdom	China

Commanders and leaders
John Wilton; Glenn C. Funk	Cheng Dengzhi

Units involved
28th British Commonwealth Brigade; 2 RAR; 16th Field Regt; 1st Tank Regt; 1st Marine Division; 1st Marine Regt; 5th Marine Regt; 7th Marine Regt; 11th Marine Regt	137th Division

Casualties and losses
5 killed 43 killed	UN claim: 2,000–3,000 killed Chinese claim: 886 casualties

The Battle of the Samichon River (24–26 July 1953) was fought during the final days of the Korean War between United Nations (UN) forces—primarily Australian and American—and the Chinese People's Volunteer Army (PVA). The fighting took place on a key position on the Jamestown Line known as "the Hook", and resulted in the defending UN troops, including the 2nd Battalion, Royal Australian Regiment (2 RAR) from the 28th British Commonwealth Brigade and the US 7th Marine Regiment, repulsing numerous assaults by the PVA 137th Division during two concerted night attacks, inflicting numerous casualties on the PVA with heavy artillery and small-arms fire. The action was part of a larger, division-sized PVA attack against the US 1st Marine Division, with diversionary assaults mounted against the Australians. With the peace talks in Panmunjom reaching a conclusion, the Chinese had been eager to gain a last-minute victory over the UN forces, and the battle was the last of the war before the official signing of the Korean armistice.

During the action, the PVA attempted to make a breakthrough to the Imjin River along the divisional boundary between the US 1st Marine Division and the 1st Commonwealth Division to turn the 1st Marine Division's flank. Yet with well-coordinated indirect fire from the divisional artillery, including the 16th Field Regiment, Royal New Zealand Artillery, and support from British Centurion tanks of the 1st Royal Tank Regiment, 2 RAR successfully thwarted both assaults, holding the Hook. UN sources estimated PVA casualties at 2,000 to 3,000 killed, with the majority of them inflicted by the New Zealand gunners. Meanwhile, on the left flank, US Marines endured the brunt of the attack, repelling the PVA onslaught with infantry and artillery. Only a few hours later, the armistice agreement was signed, ultimately ending the war. Both sides subsequently withdrew 2 kilometres (1.2 mi) within 72 hours to create the 4-kilometre (2.5 mi) Korean Demilitarised Zone.

== Background ==
=== Military situation ===
Following the Battle of Maryang San in early October 1951 the 28th British Commonwealth Brigade maintained a defensive posture for the rest of the month. Amid heavy fighting on the afternoon of 4 November the PVA recaptured Hill 317, which was by then held by the 1st Battalion, King's Own Scottish Borderers, in an action for which Private Bill Speakman was later awarded the Victoria Cross. The hill remained in PVA hands until the end of the war. The Battle of Maryang San subsequently proved to be one of the last UN actions in the war of manoeuvre, and with peace talks going on, the fighting was replaced by a static war characterised by fixed defences, trench lines, bunkers, patrols, wiring parties, and minefields reminiscent of the Western Front of 1915–1917. Construction of defensive localities sited in all-round defence with interlocking arcs of fire began almost immediately, although such operations were confined to the reverse slopes during the day due to artillery and mortar fire. Patrolling and ambushing by both sides also began to prevent the other from gaining control of no man's land. The 1st Commonwealth Division, which included British, Australian, Canadian, New Zealand, and Indian troops, subsequently occupied part of the Jamestown Line—a UN defensive position that extended 250 kilometres (160 mi) across central Korea—in the US I Corps' sector on the US Eighth Army's left flank. The war was no less bloody, though, and the division remained in the line for all but two of the remaining 19 months of the war.

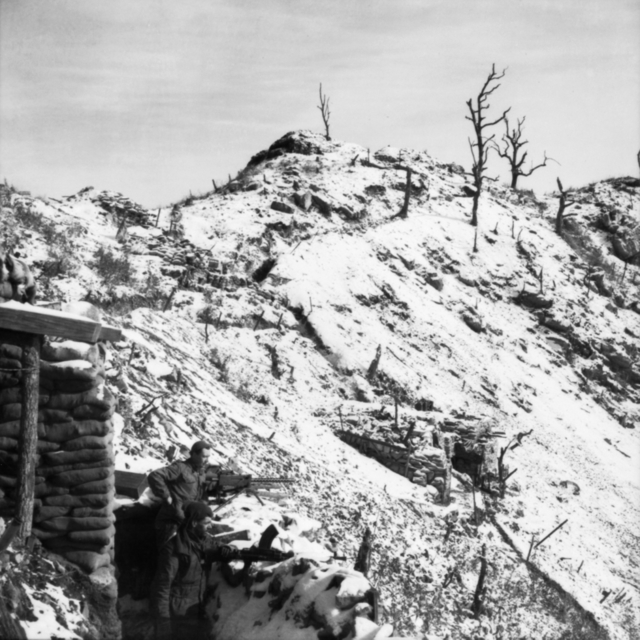
3 RAR defensive positions on the Jamestown Line, winter January 1953

From 19 January 1952, the 3rd Battalion, Royal Australian Regiment, (3 RAR) was in defence on the Jamestown Line as part of the 28th British Commonwealth Brigade before going into reserve on 18 April, where they remained until the end of June. Meanwhile, in early 1952, the Australian government had agreed to an American request to increase its forces in Korea, dispatching a second infantry battalion to join 3 RAR which had been fighting since September 1950. The 1st Battalion, Royal Australian Regiment, (1 RAR) arrived in Korea on 6 April 1952, with both battalions forming part of the 28th British Commonwealth Brigade under the command of an Australian brigadier. The brigade re-entered the line on 30 June and 1 RAR spent the following fourteen weeks patrolling, ambushing and raiding, before the 28th British Commonwealth Brigade again went into reserve on 5 October. The brigade returned to the Jamestown Line in early November, with 1 RAR taking over the defences on Hill 355 from the Canadians. The Australians were subsequently forced to clean up large quantities of rubbish left by the Canadians as well as repairing and camouflaging the defences which had recently been attacked by the PVA. 1 RAR implemented an aggressive patrol program in an effort to regain control of no-man's land from the PVA, which had been allowed to establish hides close to the perimeter. Several PVA outposts were subsequently destroyed during raids of up to company-size.

On 28 December 1952, 3 RAR took over the defences on Hill 355 and remained there until the 1st Commonwealth Division went into reserve at the end of January 1953. On 21 March, 1 RAR was replaced in Korea by 2 RAR, after nearly 12 months of operational service. Heavy fighting occurred in March, with the PVA moving back over to a limited offensive in the US I Corps' sector, in an attempt to regain the initiative following the winter. Heavy fighting occurred around the Hook, which was by then held by the US 2nd Infantry Division following the relief of the 1st Commonwealth Division, the Old Baldy and Pork Chop Hill features held by the US 7th Division, and in the western sector held by the US 1st Marine Division around the Vegas and Nevada Complex. Peace talks finally resumed at Panmunjom on 6 April and an agreement was soon made to exchange sick and wounded prisoners. Consequently, 648 UN and 6,670 PVA and North Korean prisoners were repatriated as part of Operation Little Switch on 20 April, including five Australians. For a while, the tempo of operations slackened, returning to the small-scale raids and probes of the winter months. Yet during the final three months of the war, the PVA launched a series of offensives prior to the signing of a ceasefire agreement.

In early April 1953, the 1st Commonwealth Division returned to the Jamestown Line. By this time, the division was commanded by Major General Michael West, a British officer who had taken over command in September the previous year. The 28th British Commonwealth Brigade subsequently occupied the north-eastern sector. Hill 159 was occupied by 2 RAR during 5 May to 16 June, while 3 RAR held Hill 355 during the period 7–27 May; 3 RAR then relieved 2 RAR on 16 June and remained on Hill 159 until 10 July. Meanwhile, the Hook was a key position on the left flank of the line held by the 1st Commonwealth Division and was the division's most threatened sector on the Jamestown Line. Held by the 29th British Infantry Brigade, the position consisted of a group of hills west of the Samichon River which dominated the Imjin River, 4 kilometres (2.5 mi) to the south, and provided observation and fields of fire over a bend in the river as it turned towards Seoul. Loss of the Hook would force the UN troops to withdraw nearly 8 kilometres (5.0 mi) to the next tenable defensive line on the high ground south of the Imjin River. As a result, the PVA had made repeated attacks against it, with the 1st Battalion, Princess Patricia's Canadian Light Infantry, repulsing the first PVA attempt in late-March 1952. the 1st Marine Division defended the area in the First Battle of the Hook in October 1952. The 1st Battalion, the Black Watch, did so again in November 1952, while the 1st Battalion, Duke of Wellington's Regiment, had fought the heaviest battle there in May 1953 during the Third Battle of the Hook. (Note: Chinese casualties during this attack were believed to be 250 killed and 800 wounded.)

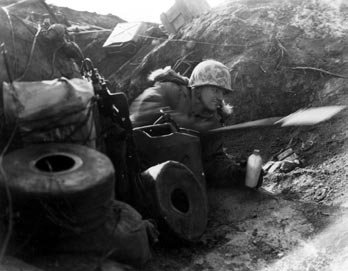
A US Marine during the fighting for the Vegas outpost, March 1953

In the western sector, American outposts such as Detroit, Berlin, East Berlin, Reno, Carson, Elko, and Vegas had been bitterly contested over the previous months by the US 1st Marine Division and the Turkish Brigade, but by June, the Reno, Elko, and Vegas positions were held by the PVA. The front subsequently returned to its usual defensive routine, but following a temporary break-down in negotiations after the unilateral release of 25,000 anti-communist Chinese and North Korean prisoners of war by President of South Korea Syngman Rhee, the PVA had renewed large-scale attacks on 24 June. Concentrating on the Republic of Korea Army (ROK) divisions in the eastern and central sectors, the PVA launched another offensive in June in an attempt to convince the South Korean leader to come to terms. The fighting continued until the end of the month, as the PVA successively drove back elements of ROK 9th Division in the US IX Corps sector and the ROK 1st Division in the US I Corps sector.

By early July, the PVA launched a major offensive in the ROK II Corps and US X Corps sectors. The Americans and ROK subsequently responded with a series of counter-attacks to regain the ground lost, yet these met with only limited success. On 6 July, the PVA attacked elements of the US 7th Division on Pork Chop Hill on the US I Corps' right flank, and succeeded in gaining the crest. The Americans were reinforced and counter-attacked over the following days, although again without success. Following another PVA assault on 9 July, the Americans again counter-attacked, yet neither side gained a clear advantage. The following day, the PVA launched a series of company- and battalion-sized assaults, but were repulsed. With the Americans unprepared to accept further casualties for limited tactical gain, though, they evacuated Pork Chop Hill on 11 July.

== Prelude ==
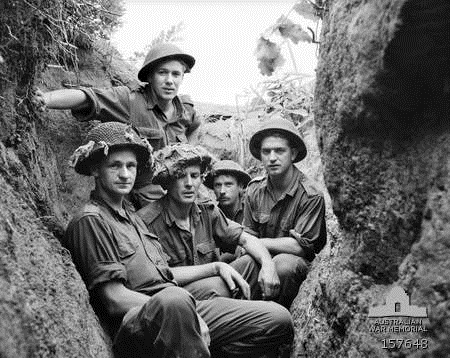
Men from 2 RAR, June 1953

The peace talks resumed in early July as Rhee's position apparently softened, yet this proved to be the impetus for a final PVA offensive, as they sought to further influence the talks and improve their defensive positions at the same time. On 14 July, elements of five PVA armies struck six South Korean divisions around the Kumsong salient. By 20 July, the ROK Capital Division and much of the ROK 3rd Division had been practically destroyed, exposing serious weaknesses despite two years of American training. The ROK fell back and the UN line was penetrated to a depth of 9.7 kilometres (6.0 mi). Only American intervention restored the situation, and ultimately, nine ROK and US divisions were required to stem the PVA offensive and regain some of the lost ground. Following a counter-attack by ROK II Corps, a new defensive line was established south of the Kumsong River. Meanwhile, in conjunction with the main offensive at Kumsong, the PVA 19th Army Group had conducted a series of limited offensives against US I Corps, with the 46th Army conducting assaulting 1st Marine Division outposts from 7 to 27 July. PVA losses were heavy nonetheless, and they sustained more than 28,000 casualties for only temporary gain.

During the second week of July, West had reshuffled his brigades to allow the 29th British Infantry Brigade to recuperate in the 1st Commonwealth Division's central sector. The 28th British Commonwealth Brigade, under the command of an Australian officer, Brigadier John Wilton, subsequently took over the battered defences on the Hook on 9–10 July 1953, on the division's left. The brigade was the strongest in the division, consisting of the two Australian battalions—2 RAR and 3 RAR—and two British battalions—the 1st Battalion, Durham Light Infantry (1 DLI) and 1st Battalion, Royal Fusiliers (1 RF)—as well as supporting artillery and armour in direct support. Among the latter was the 16th Field Regiment, Royal New Zealand Artillery (16 RNZA) and C Squadron of the British 1st Royal Tank Regiment equipped with Centurion tanks. The 25th Canadian Brigade was subsequently handed the responsibility for the equally exposed positions on Hills 355 and 159 on the right. The ROK 1st Division held the line on the 1st Commonwealth Division's right flank, while the 1st Marine Division, under the overall command of Major General Randolph Pate, held the Nevada Complex on the left flank, having taken over the line on 7–8 July. On the American right, the 7th Marine Regiment under Colonel Glenn C. Funk occupied a linear defensive position, with two battalions forward and one back. The 5th Marine Regiment occupied the central sector, while the 1st Marine Regiment held the rear in divisional reserve. Indirect fire support was provided by the 11th Marine Regiment. Meanwhile, by May 1953 the PVA 1st, 46th, 63rd, 64th and 65th Armies of the 19th Army Group were operating against the US I Corps under the overall command of Huang Yongsheng. (Note: The Chinese military did not have ranks during the 1950s, except for the title of "commander" or "commissar".) (Note: In Chinese military nomenclature, the term "army" (军) means "corps", while the term "army group" (集团军) means "field army".)

Wilton deployed the stronger Australian battalions forward, with 2 RAR occupying the left forward position on the Hook, while 3 RAR was deployed on the right, overlooking the Samichon River. The opposite side of the Samichon was occupied by 1 DLI, while 1 RF was held in reserve as a brigade counter-penetration force. 2 RAR was commanded by Lieutenant Colonel George Larkin, while 3 RAR was under the command of Lieutenant Colonel Arthur MacDonald. Larkin deployed 2 RAR with three companies forward, and one back in reserve as a counter-attack force. In the centre, the Hook was held by B Company, while C Company held the left and A Company the right, with D Company in reserve. MacDonald deployed 3 RAR with two companies forward and two in depth. A Company occupied Hill 146, on the boundary with 2 RAR, B Company held the south-eastern tip of the ridge, and C and D Companies were held in reserve. British Centurion tanks were also deployed forward to support the Australians. Directly confronting the Australians on The Hook was the PVA 137th Division, 46th Army which had been in the line since February 1953, under the command of Cheng Dengzhi. (Note: According to the Australian official history the Chinese 47th Army was facing the 1st Commonwealth Division, having relieved the 39th Army on the front line in late-October 1952. The official Chinese records indicate that the 47th Army was pulled off the front line and put into reserve status by May 1953.)

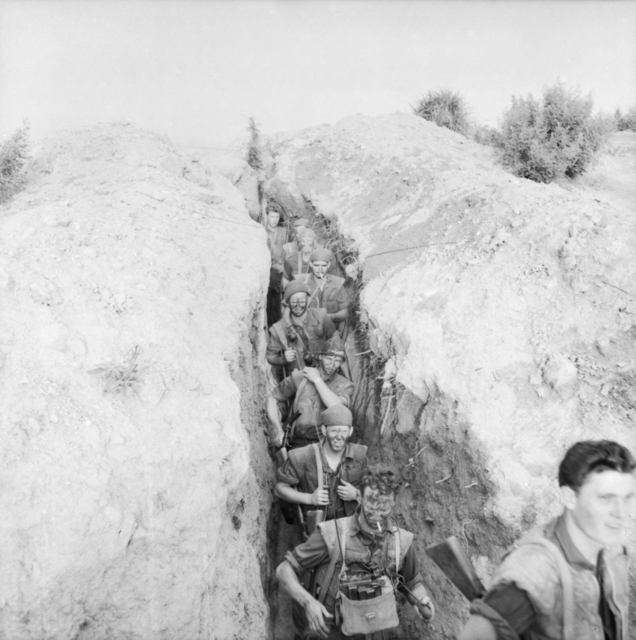
3 RAR night fighting patrol moving along a communication trench, July 1953.

The positions occupied by the Australians had been badly damaged by the PVA assaults and bombardments in May and June, and recent rain had also collapsed some trenches and weakened many of the wire obstacles, yet the extensive tunnel system, dug by the Canadians the previous winter, remained intact and afforded some protection. Efforts to repair the defences and assert control in no-man's land began immediately, with an aggressive patrolling program by the Australians leading to numerous clashes with PVA patrols, while they also endured heavy shelling during this time. By day it was hot and humid making conditions in the bunkers uncomfortable, while by night the defenders worked hard digging, wiring, and laying minefields. The PVA focused most of their attention on the 7th Marine Regiment, which was occupying positions south-west of 2 RAR after having relieved the Turkish Brigade there, and thereby allowed the Australians some time to prepare. Light mortaring hit 2 RAR on 11 July, while one 3 RAR soldier was killed instantly by a 76-millimetre (3.0 in) shell when he was observed walking along the crest-line by a PVA position less than 200 metres (220 yd) from the Australian perimeter. The gun crew was subsequently silenced by Australian sniper fire.

Patrolling by the Australians continued to prevent the PVA from harassing their forward positions. Small clashes occurred on the nights of 15/16, 21/22, 22/23, and 23/24 July, suggesting that the PVA were preparing for a major attack. Aerial reconnaissance subsequently detected a build-up of PVA forces and supplies west of the Samichon River. In response, the Australians and Marines stepped up their defensive preparations, while at the same time, rumours from the peace talks started to spread of a ceasefire. Regardless, PVA harassing artillery and mortar fire intensified, causing a constant stream of casualties among the Australians. Intense PVA shelling struck Hill 121 and the Hook on the night of 19/20 July, with more than 300 rounds wounding four members of C Company, 2 RAR, and further damaging the defences. That night, the Marines were driven off the Berlin and East Berlin features on the left flank, further exposing the Hook, which became a salient. Yet on 21 July an expected PVA assault in the 5th Marine Regiment sector failed to occur, while sightings of PVA troops across the 1st Marine Division front declined as the fighting entered a lull.

On 22 July B Company, 2 RAR was relieved on the Hook by D Company, and subsequently moved into reserve. The following day, with the ceasefire believed to be imminent, Wilton limited patrols to only those considered essential for the security of his forward positions. Rumours spread quickly among the troops that the truce was expected to be signed on 26 July. By 24 July, however, the PVA shelling had once again grown in intensity, while large bodies of PVA infantry were increasingly seen on the forward slopes by the Australians. Meanwhile, similar concentrations of PVA were also reported by the Marines. With the PVA eager to gain a last-minute victory over the UN forces and the tactical advantage offered to the side that held the Hook after the truce, simultaneous attacks were soon launched against 2 RAR and the 7th Marine Regiment on the left flank, in two major actions on the nights of 24/25 and 25/26 July.

== Battle ==
=== First night, 24/25 July 1953 ===
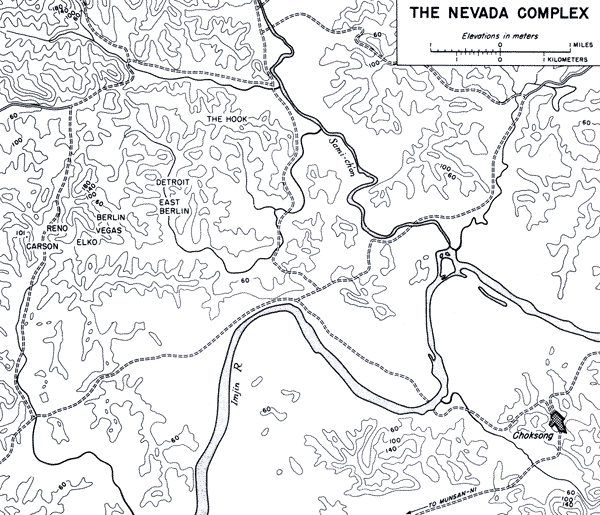
The Nevada Complex, Korea 1953.

On the evening of 24 July, a 50-strong PVA force probed 2 RAR's forward outposts after dark, attacking C Company on Hill 121 and surrounding a bunker on the left flank, while the marines had a similar contact on the left flank. A forward Australian standing patrol from D Company subsequently clashed heavily with the PVA probe, losing five wounded before directing tank and artillery fire, which dispersed their attackers. These attacks had been preceded by heavy artillery and mortar fire, with the PVA subjecting C and D companies, 2 RAR and the 2 RAR Mortar Platoon to a heavy bombardment. Waves of PVA attacked the Australians at 20:50, penetrating between C Company on Hill 121 and the nearest marines on Hill 111, before being turned back amidst the driving rain. A further attack followed another barrage at 23:25, but was again repelled and faltered before reaching the wire during fierce fighting with grenades and small arms, with the assault failing largely due to the weight of defensive artillery fire. More than 2,000 PVA mortar and artillery rounds fell on the Australian positions during the night. Two Australians were killed and 14 were wounded during the night attack, which was later estimated to have been made by a PVA regiment of up to 4,000 men. The defenders were soaking wet and exhausted, but had held their positions. Despite the weight of the PVA attack against the Australians, their main objective had been Hill 119, another strong point in the American sector 500 metres (550 yd) to the south-west of Hill 111, known as Boulder City, held by the 7th Marine Regiment.

The PVA engaged the marines on Boulder City with preparatory fire from mortars and artillery at 19:30. Ten minutes later, PVA troops were observed massing for an assault north-west of the Berlin feature, and were subsequently shelled by the Americans. At 20:30, the PVA probed the right flank held by the 3rd Battalion, 7th Marines, first striking Hill 111 and then at Boulder City. After infiltrating forward, the PVA had hid in the paddy fields immediately in front of the American positions during the barrage, and had then rapidly assaulted as soon as the artillery had lifted. The attack coincided with the ongoing relief in place of the defenders by the 1st Marine Regiment under the command of Colonel Wallace M. Nelson, and it subsequently succeeded in temporarily penetrating the American positions on Hill 111. The PVA main effort fell on Boulder City, though, and two battalions subsequently succeeded in occupying a portion of the American trench line. From these positions, the PVA threatened to cut off Company G, 3rd Battalion, 1st Marines, on Hill 119, repeatedly assaulting the Berlin Gate feature on the company's left flank and the East Berlin Gate on its right in an effort to exploit their gains. Throughout the fighting, the marines were strongly supported by heavy mortar, artillery, and tank fire; however, due to the prevailing weather conditions, no spotter aircraft were able to fly during the night, which limited the effectiveness of the indirect fire available to them.

In support of the marines on Hill 111, at 21:10, Wilton had ordered one company of 1 DLI to occupy a reserve position on the left of 2 RAR, in the rear of the 1st Marine Division, where they ultimately remained for the rest of the evening. A reserve company from 3 RAR was also readied to respond to any emergency. The Americans eventually drove off the PVA probes after their artillery broke up the attack, but not before they were forced to abandon some of their forward positions. With the attack likely only a diversionary effort, by 21:20 the bulk of the PVA had begun to withdraw from Hill 111. Meanwhile, the fighting on Hill 119 continued. A heavy bombardment fell on the American positions at 21:00, followed by a second assault on Hill 119 by two PVA companies which succeeded in penetrating the marine perimeter. Hand-to-hand combat developed across the forward trenches, and in the ensuing fighting, Company G was reduced to half-strength, while their ammunition began to run low. Under pressure, by midnight the Americans were forced back another 1,500 metres (1,600 yd) to the reverse slope. 3 RAR was subsequently left exposed, with the forward PVA elements moving to within 1,200 metres (1,300 yd) of the battalion's A Echelon area. Almost surrounded, the position was at risk of becoming untenable. At 00:15, Company I, 3rd Battalion, 1st Marines, was ordered to reinforce Boulder City; they lost heavily after the PVA intercepted a coded message and adjusted mortar and artillery fire onto the marines as they approached the rear of Hill 119. In response, the 11th Marine Artillery Regiment launched an intense counter-battery barrage.

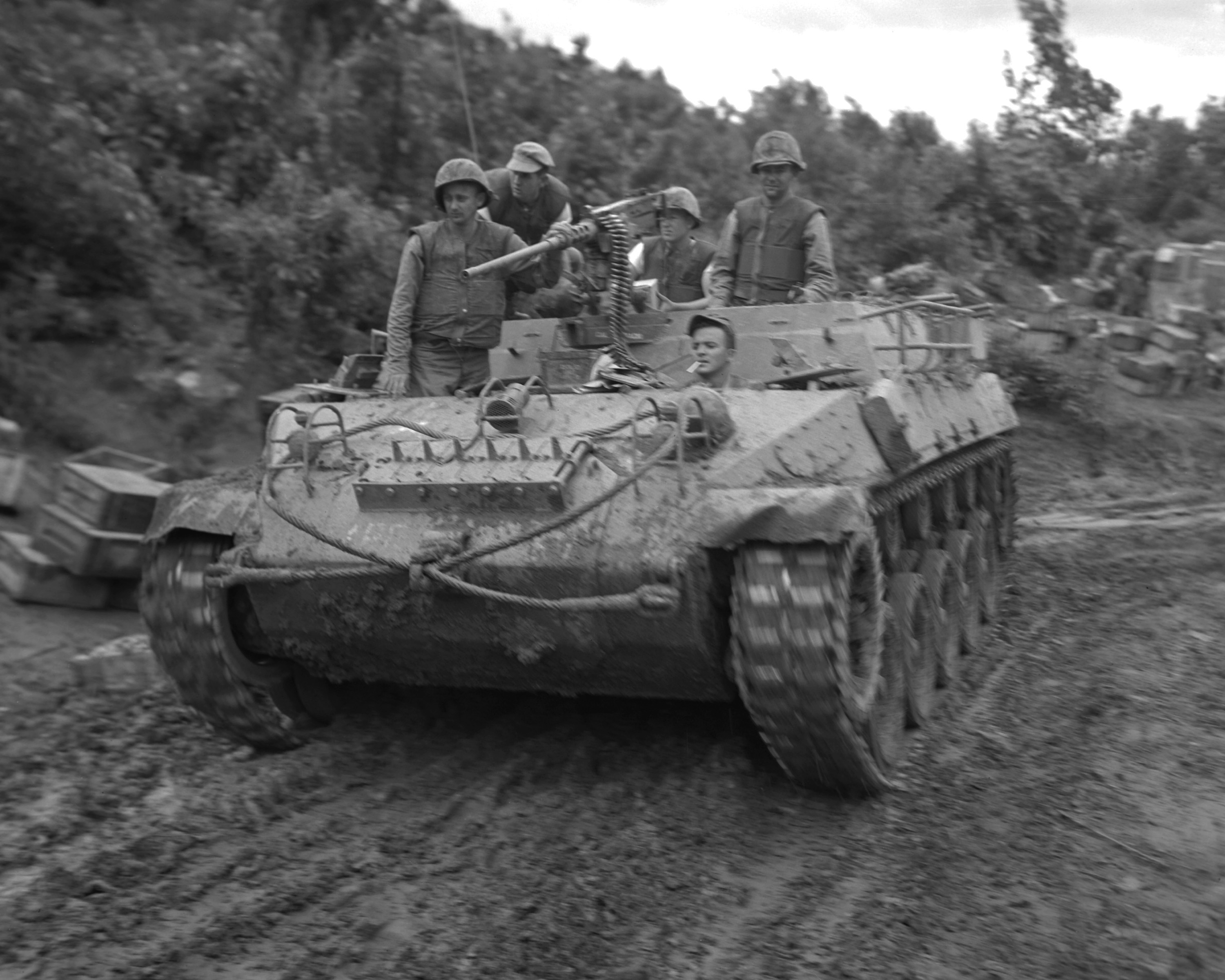
A U.S. Army M39 armored utility vehicle assists U.S. marines picking up casualties on 25 July 1953 during an attack against Hill 111, also known as "Boulder City"

The PVA also launched several assaults in the central sector against the 5th Marine Regiment, commanded by Colonel Harvey C. Tschirgi. Successively striking outposts on the regimental right flank from 21:15, a reinforced PVA company from the 408th Regiment then concentrated against outpost Esther, held by marines from Company H. Amid heavy fighting, both sides were reinforced. By early morning, the PVA had seized parts of the forward trench line and moved to isolate the position with indirect fire and patrols, which penetrated between the outpost and the main defensive position to the rear; the marines still controlled the rear trenches, and upon reorganising their defence, succeeded in checking the PVA assault. Defending strongly, the Marines used flamethrowers, machine guns, and mortars, supported by M46 Patton tanks and artillery fire, and following several hours of fighting, the PVA attack was finally broken up by indirect fire. An entire PVA battalion had been committed piecemeal to the attack, yet by 06:40 the following day, the marines reported Esther secure. More than 4,000 artillery and mortar rounds had fallen on the outpost during the night; Marine casualties included 12 killed and 35 wounded, while PVA loses included 85 dead, which were counted around the position, 110 more believed killed, and an estimated 250 wounded.

In the 7th Marine Regiment's sector, heavy shelling, small-arms fire, and hand-to-hand fighting continued around Boulder City into the early morning on 25 July. PVA infantry had succeeded in breaking through and occupying a large part of the trench line on the forward slopes, and for a while, even temporarily occupied the crest. At 01:30, companies G and I, 3rd Battalion, 1st Marines, launched a rapid counter-attack, and by 03:30, the American perimeter had been re-established, and was subsequently reinforced. By 05:30, Hill 119 was secured by the marines, although scattered groups of PVA remained on the forward slopes, while others attempted to reinforce the left flank. Sporadic fighting and heavy shelling also continued on Hill 111 in the early morning hours, and at 04:00, another fight developed; by 05:30, the position was also controlled by the Americans. Four M46 Patton tanks on Boulder City dispersed the PVA concentrations with high-explosive and machine-gun fire, while marine infantry assault teams with flamethrowers and 3.5-inch rocket launchers subsequently cleared the remaining PVA from their former bunkers. In total, more than 3,000 PVA troops had assaulted the front held by the 1st Marine Division during the night of 24/25 July.

Throughout the night, the 11th Marine Regiment had been heavily engaged, with the regiment and the 10 battalions under its operational control in the 1st Marine Division sector firing a total of 23,725 rounds, including those from batteries of the U.S. 25th Infantry Division Artillery, the US I Corps Artillery and the 1st Commonwealth Divisional Artillery. The weight of indirect fire available to the defenders had been significant, and the whole of the 1st Commonwealth Divisional Artillery (80 guns) had also been engaged during the fighting, firing in support of both the Australians on Hill 121 and the marines on their left flank, defending Hill 111 and Boulder City. Unhindered by the restrictions on ammunition usage which had applied to the marines during this period, the supporting fires of the British-Commonwealth 3.45-inch (88 mm) 25-pounder field guns proved of considerable assistance. A liaison officer from 16 RNZA was sent subsequently over to the marine artillery regiment during the night to establish communication. More than 13,000 rounds were fired by the British and New Zealand gunners that night, with the close defensive fire having a devastating effect on the assaulting PVA infantry. The artillery had also effectively halted the PVA assault against Hill 121, resulting in a fair degree of frustration among the Australian infantry, some of whom later expressed disappointment at being prevented from getting to grips with the PVA by the accurate New Zealand artillery fire.

Before the battle, a section from the 2 RAR Medium Machine Gun Platoon had been stationed within the American perimeter near Hill 111 to provide covering fire across the area between the positions occupied by the marines and the Australians. Commanded by Sergeant Brian Cooper, they soon found themselves in the thick of the fighting, firing their Vickers machine guns in support of the Australian positions and to defend themselves from the weight of the PVA main attack, which fell on the marines. Three men were wounded during the night, but the machine gunners continued to fire in support, while the remainder of the section repelled PVA assaults from the left. Ultimately, the PVA were unable to dislodge them, with the Australians calling in artillery on to their own positions during repeated PVA attempts to overrun them as the marines withdrew past their position, leaving them isolated. When dawn came, dozens of Chinese bodies were found strewn in front of the Australian machine gunners. As the marines worked to clear the PVA stragglers from their position, the Australians had endeavoured to coax a PVA soldier from a bunker, yet when he resisted, they were forced to kill him with a grenade. Cooper was later awarded the Military Medal for his leadership, with the stubborn defence of the Australians contributing to the break-up of the PVA attack, which at one stage had threatened to overrun the marine position. Large groups of PVA remained, though, occupying a number bunkers and trenches, and they were not finally dislodged by the marines until the following afternoon.

=== Second night, 25/26 July 1953 ===
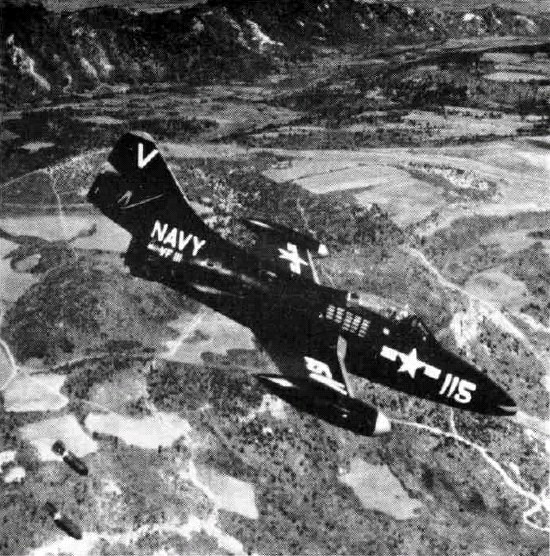
A US Navy F9F Panther over Korea, similar to those used during the fighting at the Samichon River

At 08:20 on the morning of 25 July, the PVA again assaulted the marines on Hill 119 in company strength, but were soon halted by American artillery and mortar fire, which inflicted heavy losses; skirmishing continued for the remainder of the day. While no major assaults against Hill 111 occurred, a heavy PVA barrage targeted the position at 11:00. F9F Panthers provided air support to the marines throughout the day, while American tanks continued to engage PVA targets in support of the defenders on Hill 111 and Boulder City. Finally, at 13:35, the last of the PVA infantry were forced off the forward slopes of Boulder City by the marines. PVA casualties were estimated by the Americans to have included another 75 killed and 425 wounded. The PVA continued to heavily shell the American positions, and by late afternoon, 13,500 mortar and artillery rounds had fallen on the sector held by 7th Marine Regiment. The Americans fired many counter-battery missions in response, firing 36,794 rounds. The ongoing relief of the 7th Marine Regiment continued throughout the day. Meanwhile, the Australian positions on the Hook were also heavily shelled throughout the day, forcing many of the defenders underground into the network of tunnels then being extended by a team of New Zealand sappers.

Realising that they had only faced a series of probes the previous night, rather than a major attack, and as these actions may have been in preparation for a heavier attack, a vigorous defence was subsequently prepared by the Australians with the reserve companies moved into blocking positions to strengthen the forward defences. The defenders endured steady shelling and harassing fire, while after dark, the Hook was probed again, this time by a group of about 20 PVA. The force was subsequently engaged by an Australian standing patrol from D Company at 21:00, and forced to withdraw, leaving behind one dead at a cost of one Australian killed and one wounded. At 21:20, the PVA fire became more intense, and a heavy blow was launched by the PVA against the marines on Hill 119 shortly after. Beginning at 21:30, elements of the 1st and 7th marines were attacked by two PVA companies. A heavy concentration by the entire US I Corps Artillery was fired in response, and the PVA were forced to withdraw. At 23:00, the PVA shelling intensified to 30 rounds per minute, and was followed 15 minutes later by another determined charge by PVA infantry against the Marines on the left flank on Hill 111 and Boulder City during a furious attack. The Australian positions were not directly attacked during the night, although C Company engaged the PVA in no-man's land sporadically at long range in support of the Americans. As on the previous night, 3 RAR was not attacked. In total, more than 4,200 mortar and artillery rounds were fired by the PVA at 2 RAR during the night, and three Australians were killed and nine wounded.

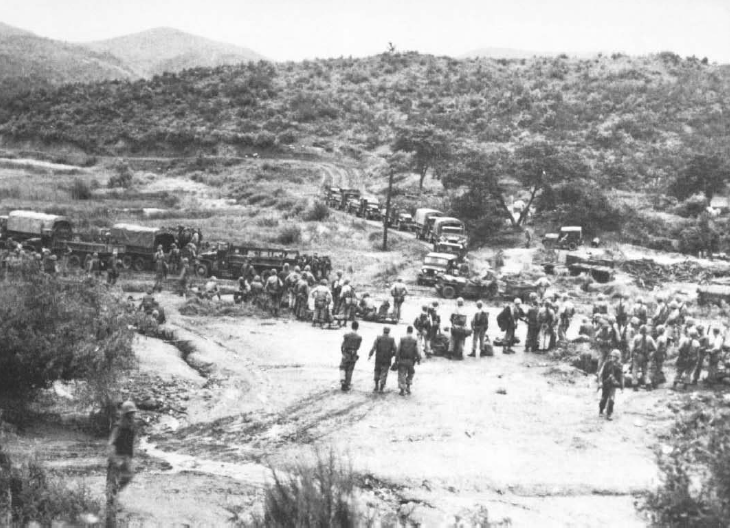
US Marines receive supplies during the fighting around Boulder City, July 1953

In contrast, the marines were more heavily engaged, with the fighting occurring at close quarters for more than an hour before they repelled their attackers and counter-attacked. An Australian bunker between the marines on Hill 111 and C Company, 2 RAR on Hill 121 was also the scene of heavy fighting, after the PVA penetrated the undefended space between the two positions. Manned by just six Australians under the command of Lance Corporal Kenneth Crockford, the position was attacked by the PVA simultaneously from several sides following a determined charge at 23:40. During bitter hand-to-hand fighting in the trenches around the bunker, the under-strength Australian section ejected the PVA and prevented them from advancing any further. They then directed artillery fire onto their position to break up subsequent attacks. Further PVA probes were launched against Hills 111 and 119 in the early hours of 26 July, and they succeeded in temporarily seizing parts of the American trench line. Between 01:30 and 03:00, heavy fighting continued before the PVA were driven from the position by the marines. Meanwhile, Wilton ordered D Company, 3 RAR, to move across to occupy the position behind B Company, 2 RAR, to support the marines if required, while at 02:18, he placed A Company, 1 DLI on five-minutes notice to move to another blocking position. American casualties were 19 killed and 125 wounded, while PVA losses included 30 men counted dead, and another 84 estimated to have been killed and 310 wounded.

The 2 RAR Machine Gun Platoon on Hill 111 again found itself heavily engaged, suffering five badly wounded. The PVA had managed to establish an artillery forward observer on Hill 111 and marine casualties were particularly heavy as a result. Eight critically injured Americans were subsequently evacuated through 2 RAR for urgent medical treatment. Small-arms fire continued to be exchanged between the marines and the PVA for the next two hours, only subsiding by 03:00, with the Marines finally driving out the PVA. D Company, 3 RAR, was subsequently released, and it returned to battalion's main defensive position. The Australian outpost section also succeeded in holding through the night, and the following morning, they found 35 PVA dead around their positions. During the fighting, Crockford had repeatedly exposed himself to PVA fire, and had even run across no-man's land to provide situation reports to the marine command post on Hill 111. He was later awarded the Military Medal for his actions. By dawn, the only activity in front of the Hook was PVA stretcher bearers collecting their wounded, who were subsequently allowed to do so unmolested by the Australians. In the 1st Marine Division's sector, the fighting had also ceased, while small groups of PVA moved to reinforce their positions and were engaged with rifle and machine-gun fire.

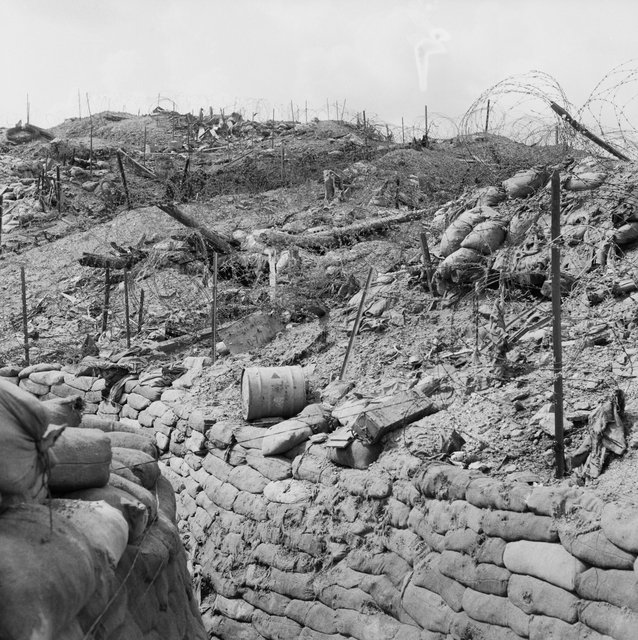
Damaged positions on the Hook

As with the first night, indirect fire had again played a crucial role in the defence, with the New Zealand gunners firing another 5,700 rounds (out of a divisional total of 9,500 rounds) in support of the Australians and the marines. Dug-in to the east, 16 RNZA had been forced to fire with minimum crest clearance over the Australian lines to bring effective fire to bear on the assaulting PVA from their 25-pounders. Using both variable-time proximity and time-set fuses, the New Zealand gunners used air bursts to break up the PVA assaults, causing heavy casualties. Despite the risk of causing casualties among their own soldiers, no serious casualties were incurred by the Australians, although one suffered a broken shoulder after a brass nose cone from a faulty time-of-flight fused shell exploded over his position. High explosive was also provided by C Company's 60 mm mortar, which operated against the PVA in no-man's land despite being exposed and unprotected from fire, while the mortars also provided battlefield illumination, which had allowed the Australian riflemen and machine gunners to bring accurate fire to bear on the PVA crossing 2 RAR's front to attack hills 111 and 121. The PVA had suffered heavily during the fighting, with over 300 dead counted in front of Hill 111 alone. Throughout the following day, the Australians observed a steady stream of PVA casualties evacuating Hill 111 and crossing the paddy fields on the left flank. Later, a group of 20 PVA had also attempted to withdraw, but were engaged by the 2 RAR Anti-Tank Platoon, resulting in at least six casualties. In the area held by the 1st Marine Division, PVA shelling continued sporadically, while at 13:30, the 1st Marine Regiment assumed operational control of the right sector.

== Aftermath ==
=== Casualties ===
The battle illustrated the power of concentrated artillery fire and the wastefulness of massed attacks by infantry against modern firepower. Hundreds of PVA dead lay in front of the UN positions, with the valley floor "almost covered with dead Chinese". Wilton later recounted that on "the approaches to 2 RAR, the bodies literally carpeted the ground sometimes two deep". Later, PVA casualties numbered an estimated 2,000 to 3,000 killed according to UN sources, with the majority of them inflicted by the New Zealand gunners. However, according to a Chinese source, the total casualties of PVA 46th Army were only at 886 men for all battles occurred from 24 June to 27 July. At least nine PVA battalions were believed to have been involved in the attacks. The fighting between 24 and 26 July had cost the Australians five killed and 24 wounded, while during the previous two weeks on the Hook, 2 RAR had lost 17 men killed and 31 wounded. It had been a bitter struggle to the very end, and as a testimony to the ferocity of the fighting, the Royal Australian Regiment was subsequently granted the battle honour "The Samichon". Many Australians were later awarded bravery decorations for their actions. (Note: Lieutenant P.O.G. Forbes was awarded the Military Cross and Sergeant B.C. Cooper, Corporal T.W. Maguire, Corporal K.H. Crockford, Private G.E. Kent, and Private J.M. McAuliffe were awarded the Military Medal. Lieutenant C.A.C. Wilson, Corporal K.J. Cooper, and Corporal K.G. Condon were mentioned in despatches, and Warrant Officer Second Class L.E. Moore was made a Member of the Order of the British Empire.) The New Zealand gunners had played a crucial role in stemming the PVA assault, and during these final actions, the commander of 163 Battery, 16 RNZA—Major James Spence—had positioned himself well-forward to effectively co-ordinate the indirect fires of his guns. Spence was subsequently awarded the Military Cross, while a member of his tactical party, gunner Arthur Bolton, was later Mentioned in Despatches. In total, over the three nights, more than 23,000 rounds were fired by the Commonwealth Divisional Artillery.

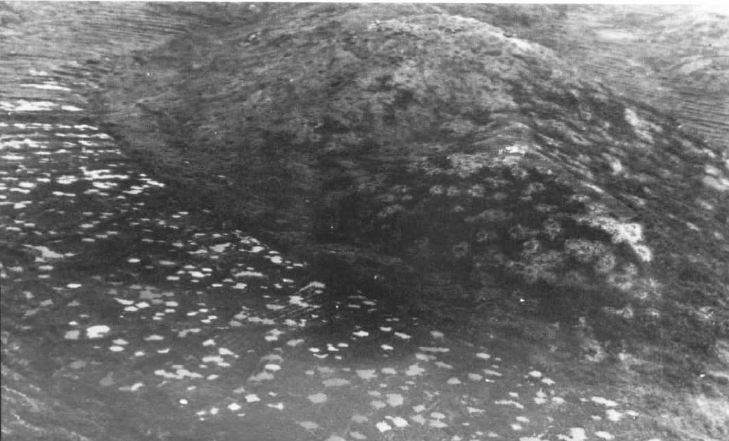
Aerial view of the battle-scarred terrain around Boulder City, July 1953.

During the final month of the war, heavy fighting had occurred across the central and eastern fronts, yet in the Commonwealth sector itself, the only PVA attacks had been made against 2 RAR holding the Hook on the nights of 24–25 and 25–26 July. The action was part of a larger attack against the 1st Marine Division, with only diversionary assaults mounted against the Australians. 1st Commonwealth Division intelligence staff believed that the PVA had been attempting to make a breakthrough to the Imjin River along the divisional boundary to turn the 1st Marine Division's flank, yet with well-coordinated indirect fire from the divisional artillery and support from the British tanks, 2 RAR had been able to successfully thwart both assaults. Meanwhile, the marines had endured the brunt of a division-sized attack, repelling the PVA onslaught for the loss of 43 killed and 316 wounded over the two nights; total marine casualties for July included 181 killed and 1,430 wounded. (Note: American estimates of PVA losses during fighting in the 1st Marine Division sector in July included 405 counted dead, 761 estimated killed, 1,988 estimated wounded and 1 captured.) With the Chinese determined to gain local territorial advantage prior to signing the ceasefire, the UN command had suffered 65,000 casualties during the final three months of the war, while the PVA lost at least 135,000.

=== Subsequent operations ===
On 26 July, Wilton had ordered Lieutenant Colonel Peter Jeffreys to prepare a counter-attack by 1 DLI to recover some of the ground lost to the PVA the night before, but after preparatory fire failed to clear the PVA from the objective, the assault was cancelled. The PVA subsequently made another attempt against the marines on Hill 119 on the night of 26/27 July, but it lacked the weight of those of the previous nights, and was easily repelled. In a final attempt to capture Boulder City, at 21:30, a PVA platoon had advanced on the wire at Hill 119, defended by Company E, 2nd Battalion, 1st Marines. Just after midnight, another platoon-sized PVA assault was also halted by the marines. At 00:45 a PVA platoon probed the marines on Hill 111, yet after an hour and twenty minutes it was also checked. Meanwhile, despite the clashes nearby on Hill 111 the Australians suffered no more casualties. The Armistice Agreement was subsequently signed at 10:00 on 27 July with a ceasefire coming into effect at 22:00. Sporadic fighting continued, and the New Zealand gunners fired several counter-battery tasks, engaging several PVA guns. The Commonwealth Divisional Artillery fired 1,300 rounds during the day; by evening, the front was largely silent. In the last four hours of the war, the PVA fired 44,000 artillery rounds into the US Eighth Army positions, although none against the 1st Commonwealth Division. No further attacks occurred, and the ceasefire came into effect at 22:00. The following day, some soldiers from both sides moved forward into no-man's land to exchange greetings, although relatively few Australians did so, and the marines were under orders not to fraternise or communicate with the Chinese.

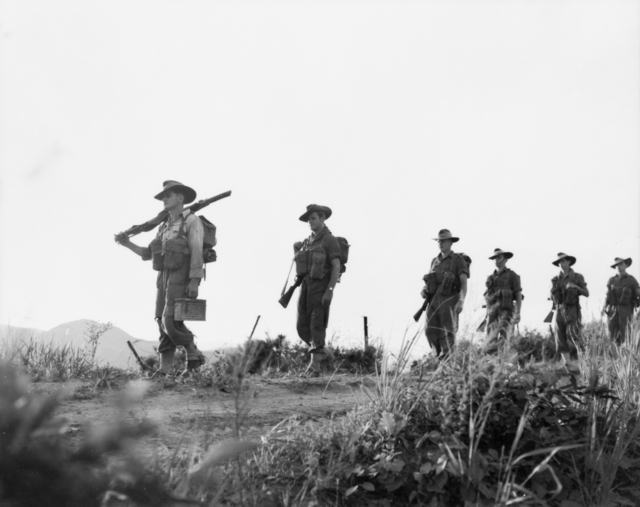
Soldiers from 2 RAR withdrawing to the DMZ, 72 hours after the ceasefire

With the war over, both sides were required to withdraw 2 kilometres (1.2 mi) within 72 hours to create the 4-kilometre (2.5 mi) Korean Demilitarised Zone, and preparations began to hastily evacuate the forward positions. During August and September, sappers from the 1st Commonwealth Division were subsequently engaged clearing minefields and demolishing many of their former defended localities and field defences, while new battle positions were established to the rear. A similar process occurred across the entire front. Meanwhile, under the terms of the agreement, all prisoners who wished to be repatriated were to be returned, and 12,773 UN and 75,000 Chinese and North Korean prisoners were subsequently exchanged during this period, including 21 Australians and one New Zealander. (Note: This figure does not include the sick and wounded repatriated in April 1953 as part of Operation Little Switch, including five sick and wounded Australians.) The period that followed proved uneventful, yet the UN forces were required to maintain combat readiness and the ability to react quickly in case the North Koreans violated the ceasefire. In April 1954, 2 RAR returned to Australia and were replaced by 1 RAR, which remained in South Korea until March 1956. In September 1954, 3 RAR finally returned to Australia after four years of continuous service in Korea and five years before that in Japan. British Commonwealth forces remained in Korea until they were finally withdrawn in August 1957. Meanwhile, the last PVA elements did not leave Korea until 1958.

== Notes ==
Footnotes

Citations
