= 174th Division =

174th Division may refer to:

- 174th Division (People's Republic of China)
- 174th Reserve Division, Wehrmacht, Germany
- 174th Rifle Division, Soviet Union

== See also ==
- List of military divisions by number
- 174th Brigade (disambiguation)
- 174th Regiment (disambiguation)
- 174th (disambiguation)
