= 138th Motorized Infantry Brigade =

133rd Division (1948–60) 133rd Army Division (1960–69) 138th Army Division (1969–85) 138th Infantry Division (1985–2003) 138th Motorized Infantry Brigade (2003–2017) 138th Combined Arms Brigade (2017–)
- Active: 1948.11 -
- Country: People's Republic of China
- Branch: People's Liberation Army
- Type: Brigade
- Role: Infantry
- Part of: 80th Group Army
- Garrison/HQ: Laiyang, Shandong
- Engagements: Chinese Civil War, Korean War, Sino-Soviet border conflict, Vietnam War, Sino-Vietnam War

The 133rd Division (Chinese: 第133师) was created in November 1948 under the Regulation of the Redesignations of All Organizations and Units of the Army, issued by Central Military Commission on November 1, 1948, basing on the 22nd Division, 8th Column of the Fourth Field Army. Its history could be traced to the 2nd and 3rd Brigade of the Jire Column and the 1st Brigade of the Jizhong Column formed in September 1945.

In the composition of 45th Corps it took part in the Chinese Civil War, including the Winter Offensive of 1947 in Northeast China, Liaoshen Campaign, Pingjin Campaign, Hengbao Campaign and Guangxi Campaign.

The division was composed of 397th, 398th, and 399th Infantry Regiments.

In July 1952, the division detached from the 45th Corps to join the 46th Corps, when the 138th division from the latter corps attached to the 45th Corps.

From August 1952 to October 1955 the division was deployed to North Korea as a part of the People's Volunteer Army.

In June 1953, 516th Artillery Regiment was activated and attached to the division.

In October 1955, the division left North Korea along with the corps HQ and was relocated at Yanji, Jilin Province.

In May 1957, the 399th Regiment was reconstituted into reduced status. In February 1960, the 399th Regiment was reestablished to full strength.

In April 1960 the division was redesignated as the 133rd Army Division (Chinese: 陆军第133师). The division was then composed of:

- Divisional Headquarters - Yanji, Jilin
- 397th Regiment - Longjing, Jilin
- 398th Regiment - Tumen, Jilin
- 399th Regiment - Helong, Jilin
- 516th Artillery Regiment - Yanji, Jilin

In June 1962, the 133rd Army Division was reconstituted as a division category A.

On March 2, 1969, a reconnaissance sub-unit of the 133rd Army Division participated in the Sino-Soviet border conflict in Zhenbao Island area.

In August 1969, the 516th Artillery Regiment was redesignated as the Artillery Regiment, 133rd Army Division.

In December 1969, the division was redesignated as the 138th Army Division(Chinese: 陆军第138师):

- The 397th Regiment was redesignated as the 412th Regiment;
- The 397th Regiment was redesignated as the 413th Regiment;
- The 397th Regiment was redesignated as the 414th Regiment.

From June to July 1975, the division was relocated to Xuzhou, Jiangsu.

In September 1978, the division was relocated to Anqiu, Shandong:

- The 412th Regiment was relocated at Zhucheng Town;
- The 412th Regiment was relocated at Jingzhi Town, Anqiu;
- The 412th Regiment was relocated at Mengtong Town, Zhucheng;
- The Artillery Regiment was relocated at Mazhan Town, Yishui.

From March 1985 to February 1986, the division was deployed to the Sino-Vietnam border under the operational control of the 67th Army Corps (later 67th Army). During its deployment, the division suffered 108 KIA and 314 wounded, while allegedly inflicting 2100 casualties on the confronting PAVN forces.

In August 1985, the division was redesignated as the 138th Infantry Division(Chinese: 步兵第138师) and reconfigured as a northern motorized infantry division, category A. The division was transferred to the 26th Army following 46th Army Corps' disbandment. By then the division was composed of:

- 412th Infantry Regiment
- 413th Infantry Regiment
- 414th Infantry Regiment
- Tank Regiment - former Tank Regiment, 46th Army Corps
- Artillery Regiment
- Anti-Aircraft Artillery Regiment - former Anti-Aircraft Artillery Regiment, 46th Army Corps

In May and June 1989, the division participated in the pacification on the civil unrest in Beijing along with the corps HQ. On June 4, 1989, the division failed to take control of the Yongdingmen area.

In 1998, the division was reorganized:

- The 414th Infantry Regiment and Tank Regiment were disbanded.
- Armored Regiment, 138th Infantry Division was reactivated from the Tank Brigade, 26th Army.

The division was then composed of:

- 412th Infantry Regiment
- 413th Infantry Regiment
- Armored Regiment
- Artillery Regiment
- Anti-Aircraft Artillery Regiment

In September 2003, the division was reduced and redesignated as the 138th Motorized Infantry Brigade(Chinese: 摩托化步兵第138旅).

In April 2017, the brigade was further reconfigured as the 138th Light Combined Arms Brigade(Chinese: 轻型合成第138旅).

The brigade now stations in Laiyang, Shandong, as a maneuvering part of the PLA 80th Group Army.
