= 138th Brigade =

138th Brigade may refer to:

== China ==
- 138th Motorized Infantry Brigade (People's Republic of China)

== Russia ==
- 138th Guards Motor Rifle Brigade

== Spain ==
- 138th Mixed Brigade

== Ukraine ==
- 138th Anti-aircraft Missile Brigade
- 138th Radio Technical Brigade

== United Kingdom ==
- 138th (Lincoln and Leicester) Brigade

== United States ==
- 138th Field Artillery Brigade

== See also ==
- 138th Division (disambiguation)
- 138th Regiment (disambiguation)
