= 174th =

174th is the ordinal form of the number 174. 174th or One hundred and seventy-fourth may also refer to:

- A fraction, 1/174, equal to one of 174 equal parts

== Geography ==
- 174th meridian east, a line of longitude
- 174th meridian west, a line of longitude
- 174th Street (disambiguation)

== Military ==
- 174th Brigade (disambiguation)
- 174th Division
- 174th Regiment (disambiguation)

== See also ==
- June 23, 174th day of the year in a standard year
