= Battle of the Berlin Outposts and Boulder City =

Battle of the Korean War

Coordinates: 37.965°N 126.721°E

- Part of the Korean War
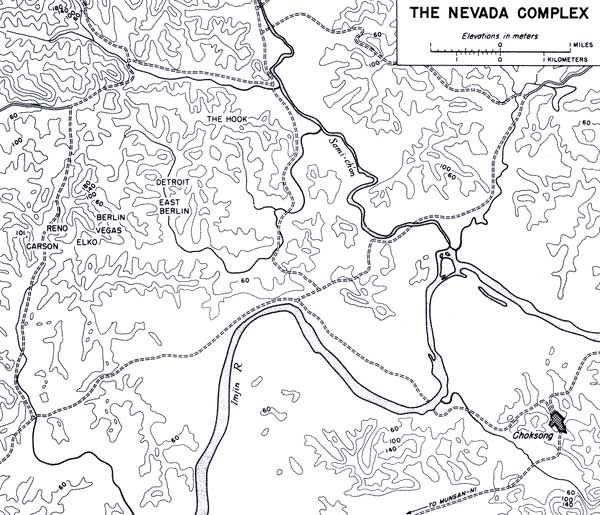
- Map showing location of Berlin Outposts
Date	7–27 July 1953
Location	Northeast of Panmunjom, Korea
Result	Disputed

Belligerents
United Nations: United States	China

Commanders and leaders
General Randolph M. Pate	

Units involved
1st Marine Division	136th Division

Casualties and losses
1,611 casualties	UN estimate 3,100 casualties

The Battle of the Berlin Outposts and Bunker City was fought between 7 and 27 July 1953 during the Korean War between United Nations Command (UN) and Chinese forces over several frontline outposts.

== Background ==
In late June 1953 the US 1st Marine Division completed its training and prepared to return to the Jamestown Line, the UN's Main line of resistance (MLR) across Korea relieving the US 25th Infantry Division. By dawn on 7 July, the 7th Marine Regiment took over on the right of the 1st Marine Division's line and the 5th Marine Regiment on the left, while the 1st Marine Regiment formed the division reserve, protecting the bridges across the Imjin River and the AN/MPQ-2 radar used to direct air strikes. The tactical situation had changed for the worse since the Marines last occupied this sector. Since the Battle of the Nevada Complex ended on 29 May, the Chinese People's Volunteer Army (PVA) troops now controlled the three outposts, Carson, Vegas, and Elko, that blocked the best approach to Outposts Berlin and East Berlin, now being taken over by the 7th Marines. As General Randolph M. Pate, the division's commander, immediately realized: "The loss of Outpost Vegas... placed Berlin and East Berlin in very precarious positions and negated their being supported by ground fire except from the MLR." The PVA tried to take advantage of any confusion resulting from the relief of the 25th Infantry Division by the Marines.

== Battle ==
=== Berlin Outposts (7-20 July) ===
On the evening of 7 July, PVA mortars opened fire upon Outposts Berlin and East Berlin and the nearby portion of the MLR, the area that Lieutenant Colonel Alexander Cereghino's 2nd Battalion, 7th Marines, was taking over from Turkish Brigade attached to the 25th Infantry Division. By midnight, assault troops from the PVA 407th Regiment, 136th Division, advanced from the vicinity of Hill 190, a frequently used staging area, then moved along the ridgeline broken by Carson, Reno and Vegas, all of them now in PVA hands and attacked Berlin and East Berlin. At Berlin, Turkish soldiers stayed in place for a time after the Marines arrived, and a patrol dispatched from Cereghino's battalion to set up an ambush got no farther than the outpost when the PVA struck. The remaining Turks and the newly arrived patrol reinforced the Marines manning Berlin. Higher headquarters soon lost contact with both Berlin and East Berlin. Because both outposts lay no more than 325 yards (297 m) from the MLR, their capture could provide the PVA with a springboard for an attack designed to shatter the main defenses. As a result, Cereghino organized a provisional platoon from members of his battalion headquarters and sent the unit to reinforce the MLR. Elements of Companies H and I, 3rd Battalion, 7th Marines, came under Cereghino's operational control and prepared to counterattack if the PVA should break through. Meanwhile, the mixed force of Marines and Turkish soldiers succeeded in clinging to Outpost Berlin. However, the Marines at East Berlin succumbed to an overwhelming force that surged up a steep slope and seized the main trench despite stubborn resistance from the outpost itself and accurate fire from the MLR and beyond. Supporting machine guns, mortars and artillery could not save East Berlin.

A squad from Company F, 2/7 Marines, unsuccessfully counterattacked Outpost East Berlin at 04:15 on 8 July, dispensing with the usual artillery barrage in the hope of achieving surprise. A second force of Marines from Company F moved out at about 04:40 to reinforce the squad already committed to attacking East Berlin. PVA artillery caught the reinforcements in the open and wounded 15 Marines, but the attempted counterattack continued for another hour until the men of Company F received orders to fall back so the 11th Marine Regiment could fire a time-on-target concentration against the PVA-held outpost. The PVA who overran East Berlin had advanced by way of Reno and Vegas, where additional forces were now gathering to exploit this early success. The 1st 4.5-inch Rocket Battery hammered the assembly areas and also the PVA attacking Berlin and consolidating their hold on East Berlin. Artillerymen of the 2nd Battalion, 11th Marines, fired a time-on-target concentration that shattered a PVA company as it was organizing on Outpost Vegas to continue the attack. During the early morning's fighting, all four battalions of the 11th Marines took part in the firing, along with the seven US Army and Turkish artillery battalions still in the area until the relief of the 25th Infantry Division was completed. These weapons matched their PVA counterparts almost round for round, and Army and Marine Corps tanks joined the rocket battery and artillery battalions in battering the PVA.

Not until 06:30 did Cereghino obtain confirmation that East Berlin had fallen, and shortly afterward he learned that Berlin, some 300 yards (270 m) west of the captured outpost, still survived. He promptly reinforced Berlin insofar as its compact size permitted, dispatching 18 additional Marines, roughly doubling the number of the outpost's American and Turkish defenders. To recapture East Berlin would require a strong force of infantry supported by intense fire from mortars, tanks, and artillery. At 10:00, taking advantage of an artillery and mortar barrage totalling perhaps 1,600 rounds, a reinforced platoon from Company G, 3/7 Marines, and another from that battalion's Company H, both companies now under Cereghino's operational control, launched the counterattack. The platoon from Company H led the way but encountered an accurate PVA mortar barrage that pinned the Marines against the barbed wire protecting the MLR and in 15 minutes reduced the force to about 20 men able to fight. The platoon from Company G advanced through the battered unit and pressed home the counterattack. Shells fired by tanks and artillery exploded immediately in front of the infantrymen, enabling the assault force to reach the main trench on East Berlin and use grenades and small arms fire to kill, capture, or drive off the PVA. At 12:33, the platoon from Company I, reduced to fewer than two-dozen effectives, regained control of the outpost. Another platoon from the same company immediately moved forward to reinforce the survivors.

Throughout the fighting at Berlin and East Berlin, storms had disrupted the movement of supplies by swelling the Imjin out of its banks and destroying a bridge. The bad weather also created mud that hampered movement on the battlefield and brought clouds that reduced visibility of supporting aircraft. At about noon on 8 July, however, four Marine F9Fs of VMF-311 took advantage of ground-based radar to attack targets a safe distance from East Berlin, dropping five tons of bombs on bunkers and troop concentrations. Heavy downpours hampered frontline combat and grounded the 1st Marine Air Wing for a total of 12 days early in July. Rain fell on 22 days that month, but the wing nevertheless reported 2,668 combat sorties, more than half of them flown in close support all along the United Nations line. The weather improved after mid-month, enabling aerial activity to increase.

The recapture of East Berlin enabled the last of the Turkish troops to withdraw, completing the relief of the US 25th Infantry Division. The 11th Marines resumed its normal mission of direct support of the 1st Marine Division, as did the 1st Tank Battalion.

Regaining Outpost East Berlin on 8 July, which coincided with the resumption of truce negotiations at Panmunjom, did not end the PVA pressure on the Marines. After dark on the 8th, Colonel Glenn C. Funk, who had assumed command of the 7th Marines on 27 March, moved a platoon from the regiment's 3rd Battalion and four M46 Patton tanks into position to strengthen the MLR. The tanks had just arrived at Hill 126, an outcropping just to the rear of the battle line, when the Marines heard the sound of trucks from beyond PVA lines. From the hilltop, the M-46s directed 90mm fire against known PVA positions, and the noise of truck motors ended. PVA troops, who meanwhile had advanced from the assembly area on Vegas, probed Outpost Berlin and struck a stronger blow against East Berlin. Fighting raged for almost two hours before fire from mortars, artillery and tanks forced the PVA to break off the action at about 03:15 on 9 July. After Cereghino's Marines ended this latest threat to East Berlin, the PVA remained content to jab at the division rather than try for a knockout. Entire days might pass during which Marine aerial or ground observers and patrols saw few, if any, signs of the PVA who seemed to be improving their tunnels and bunkers instead of venturing out of them to mount an attack. The Marines still underwent sporadic shelling, but the bombardments did not approach in ferocity those of 8 and 9 July. Mines for a time proved deadlier than artillery and mortars, as on 12 July when these weapons killed four Marines and wounded eight. At least one minefield contained a new type of Russian-designed weapon that could be detonated by pressure or with a trip wire. Most of the fields employed mines familiar to the Marines, types that may have been newly planted or perhaps had lain dormant under the frozen ground and become deadly when the weather grew warmer and the earth softer.

Although the PVA did not attack on the scale of 7–8 July, PVA patrols repeatedly clashed all along the division's front with those sent out by the Marines. On the night of 12 July, for example, a 13-man patrol from the 5th Marines encountered a force of PVA near Outpost Esther, and a combat patrol from the 7th Marines, looking for the PVA near Elko, engaged in an 18-minute firefight. As the frequency of patrol actions increased, flooding again interfered with the supply effort. On the night of 14–15 July, the Imjin River reached a maximum depth of 26 feet (7.9 m). Only the solidly-built Freedom Bridge, carrying the road to Panmunjom across the swollen river, could be used until the water subsided. On the night of 16–17 July, patrols from the 5th Marines engaged in two firefights, suffering no casualties in the first, near Outpost Hedy, while killing three PVA and wounding one. The regiment's second patrol of the night ran into an ambush near Hill 90. The PVA proved more aggressive than in recent days, pinning down the patrol and unleashing a flurry of mortar and artillery fire that wounded every member of a unit sent to help break the ambush. Another group of reinforcements succeeded, however, in reaching the embattled patrol. After two hours of fighting and several attempts to isolate and capture individual Marines, the PVA withdrew, having suffered 22 killed and wounded. When seven Marines failed to return to the MLR, a platoon from the 5th Marines searched the battle site and recovered six bodies. The third firefight of the night erupted just after midnight in the sector of the 7th Marines, when a 30-man patrol from Company A, 1st Battalion, was ambushed after it passed through a gate in the barbed wire northwest of Outpost Ava. Between 40 and 50 PVA, supported by mortars, opened fire with grenades and small arms. After a 15-minute exchange of fire in which as many as 18 PVA may have been killed or wounded, the ambush party vanished into the darkness. As the Marines from Company A returned through the gate, a head count revealed four men missing. A recovery squad crossed and recrossed the area until dawn drew near but found only three bodies. One Marine from Company A remained missing; three had been killed and 21 wounded.

The actions near Outpost Elko and in front of the Ava gate lent credence to Chinese propaganda. Since the 1st Marine Division returned to the main line of resistance, Chinese loudspeakers had gone beyond the usual appeals to surrender, on at least one occasion warning of the fatal consequences of going on nighttime patrols. This threat, however, probably reflected a Chinese policy of maintaining overall military pressure after the resumption of truce talks rather than a specific effort to demoralize the Marines. Whatever the purpose of the PVA's propaganda, the Marine patrols continued. On the night after the ambush of Company A, 1/7 Marines advanced as far as the Ungok hills to silence a machine gun that had been harassing the MLR and, after a successful 20-minute firefight, left a Marine Corps recruiting poster to mark the point of farthest advance. Meanwhile, the Korean Marines had four patrol contacts with the PVA, none lasting more than a few minutes.

The combat outposts like the Berlins, Esther and Ava had become increasingly vulnerable. By mid-July, General Pate directed his staff to study the possibility of the 1st Marine Division's shifting from a linear defense, the continuous MLR and the network of outlying combat outposts in front of it, to a system of mutually supporting defensive strongpoints that would result in greater depth and density. The PVA attacks of 7 and 8 July on Berlin and East Berlin served as a catalyst for the study that Pate launched. As the US I Corps commander, General Bruce C. Clarke, later explained, these actions demonstrated that American minefields and barbed wire entanglements had channeled movement between the MLR and the combat outpost lines into comparatively few routes that had become dangerously familiar to the PVA. As a result, PVA mortars and artillery could savage the troops using these well-worn tracks to reinforce an embattled outpost, withdraw from one that had been overwhelmed, or counterattack to regain a lost position. Indeed, US Eighth Army commander General Maxwell D. Taylor agreed that the PVA could, if he chose to pay the price in blood and effort, overrun any of the existing outposts, and endorsed the concept that Pate's staff was studying. The change in tactics, however, had not yet gone into effect when the PVA next attacked the Marine positions, but the new assault forced 7th Marines to adopt, in a modified form, the principles of depth and density that the division commander was suggesting.

When the PVA again attacked, a ceasefire seemed imminent. President of South Korea Syngman Rhee agreed on 11 July to accept American assurances of future support and enter into a truce. By the 19th, the negotiators at Panmunjom seemed to have resolved the last of the major issues. On this very date, however, the PVA struck.

On the night of 19–20 July, the PVA again assaulted Outposts Berlin and East Berlin, now manned by the 3/7 Marines, which had relieved the 2nd Battalion, and also menaced Outposts Dagmar and Ingrid, held by elements of the 5th Marines. The positions of the 5th Marines held firm, thanks in part to accurate fire from the 11th Marines, but Berlin and East Berlin were in peril almost from the outset. After a savage bombardment of both Berlins and nearby segments of the MLR, PVA troops at 22:30 on the 19th stormed the ridgeline where the two outposts were located, attacking East Berlin first and Berlin immediately afterward. Company I, 3/7 Marines, garrisoned both outposts, posting 37 Marines at East Berlin and 44 at Berlin. Mortars, machine guns, howitzers and 90mm tank guns blasted the advancing PVA in support of Company I. Despite the firepower massed against them, the PVA overran both outposts within three hours. A duel between US and PVA gunners continued after the fall of the two Berlins. The PVA fired some 3,000 rounds while overwhelming the outposts and trying to neutralize the nearby MLR and the artillery batteries behind it. One Turkish and two Army artillery battalions joined three battalions of the 11th Marines, two of 105mm and one of 155mm howitzers, in responding to the PVA bombardment, battering the assault force, its supporting mortars and howitzers, and the assembly areas used by reinforcements in exploiting the early success. Barrage and counter-barrage continued into the morning of 20 July; at 05:20, for example, PVA shells were exploding at the rate of one per second on the MLR immediately behind Outposts Berlin and East Berlin. Meanwhile, at 04:00 Lieutenant Colonel Paul M. Jones, in command of the 3/7 Marines, alerted Companies D and E of the regiment's 2d Battalion, already under his operational control, to counterattack Berlin and East Berlin at 07:30. Half an hour before the scheduled time, Jones received word to cancel the counterattack. Rather than restore the outpost line, Pate shifted elements of the division reserve, the 1st Marines, to strengthen the MLR in the event the PVA should try to exploit their capture of the two Berlins.

While the 1st Marines reinforced the MLR, air power and artillery tried to neutralize the outposts the PVA had captured. Since a ceasefire seemed only days away and any attempt to regain the lost ground would result in severe Marine casualties, there would be no counterattack to restore a position that seemed almost certain to be abandoned when a demilitarized zone took shape after the end of hostilities. Instead, air strikes and fire from tanks and artillery scourged the lost outposts to prevent the PVA from using them to mount an assault on the main defenses. Especially effective were attacks by Marine aircraft against Berlin and East Berlin and bombardment by Army 8-inch and 240mm howitzers, adjusted by Marine aerial observers, which shattered bunkers and collapsed almost all the trenches on both outposts. Jones' 3/7 Marines, estimated that the fighting on 19–20 July had killed perhaps 75 PVA and wounded as many as 300, thus crippling a battalion that had to be replaced by a fresh unit. The 7th Marines and attached units lost six killed, 118 wounded, and 56 missing, but 12 of the missing men survived as prisoners of war and returned in the general exchange when the fighting ended.

=== Boulder City ===
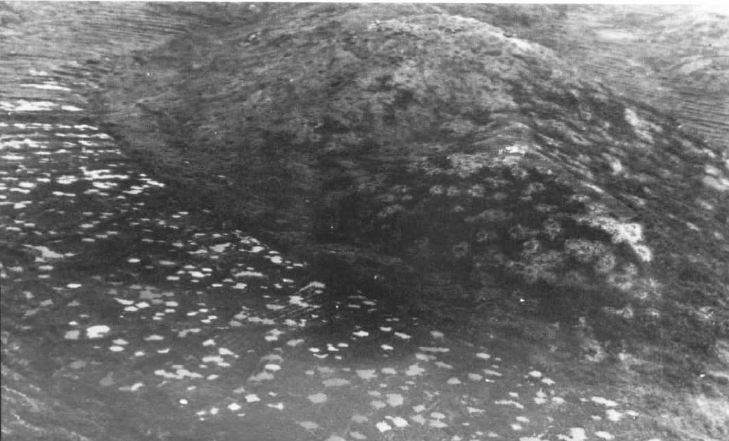
Aerial view of the battle-scarred terrain around Boulder City, July 1953

Once the PVA captured Berlin and East Berlin, the critical terrain feature on the right of the sector held by the 1st Marine Division became Hill 119, nicknamed Boulder City, the segment of the MLR nearest the two lost outposts and therefore the likely objective of any deeper PVA thrust. Company D, 2/7 Marines, (attached to the regiment's 3rd Battalion) held Boulder City itself. Company E, 2/7 Marines, (also attached to the 3rd Battalion) joined Companies H and I of the 3rd Battalion in defending the high ground extending from behind Boulder City, although within supporting distance, to Hill 111 at the boundary between the 1st Marine Division and the 1st Commonwealth Division. The newly arrived 2nd Battalion, 1st Marines moved into position between the 3/7 Marines, on its right and 1/7 Marines, on its left. The 2/7 Marines, served as regimental reserve. The introduction of 2/1 Marines, which came under control of the 7th Marines, served as the first step in a planned relief of the 7th Marines by the 1st Marines. For now, the newly arrived battalion added further depth and density to the MLR, organizing Hill 126 and the other commanding heights in its sector. In effect, three battalions, rather than the two previously defending the regimental area, formed a crescent of strongpoints designed to contain and defeat any offensive launched from Berlin and East Berlin. In the sector held by the 7th Marines, Outpost Ava, manned by a squad from Company A, 1/7 Marines, survived on the far left, near the boundary between the 7th and 5th Marines. Boulder City, formerly a component of a continuous MLR, now functioned as an outpost of the reconstituted defenses. By 22 July, Company G, 3/7 Marines, had taken over Boulder City, from the regiment's Company D, which reverted to the control of its parent battalion, 2/7 Marines, in reserve.

Signs of an imminent PVA attack multiplied as July drew to a close. The probable objectives seemed to include Outposts Hedy and Dagmar, but instead of attacking either in force, the PVA sent only a token force, wearing burlap camouflage, that appeared near Hedy on 21 July. The defenders opened fire, killing three of the PVA, and the survivors fled. VMF-115 and VMF-311, released by the Fifth Air Force to support the UN troops fighting in central and eastern Korea, joined VMA-121 in pounding the PVA threatening the 1st Marine Division. Recurring cloud cover produced frequent downpours that interfered with operations during the critical period of 21–23 July, but the three squadrons nevertheless flew more than 15 radar-directed missions that dropped some 33 tons of bombs.

As the threats to Outposts Hedy and Dagmar abated, PVA forces menaced Boulder City, where Company G, 3/1 Marines, commanded by First Lieutenant Oral R. Swigart, Jr., manned the defenses after relieving Company D, 2/7 Marines. On the evening of 24 July, PVA mortars and artillery began hammering Swigart's perimeter. Marine artillery and 4.5-inch rocket launchers immediately responded against targets that included a PVA regiment massing behind Hill 139, northwest of Outpost Berlin. At 20:30, PVA troops began probing the right of the 1st Marine Division's line. After a powerful barrage by mortars and artillery, the assault force hit Hill 111 at the far right of the positions held by the 7th Marines, then shifted to Boulder City near the boundary between the 3/7 Marines, and the attached 2/1 Marines. As they had on 7 July, the PVA sought to take advantage of the relief of the 7th Marines by the 1st Marines. When the PVA attack began, the 2/1 Marines, attached to the 7th Marines, had already taken over positions that included Boulder City. The 3rd Battalion, 1st Marines was relieving the 3/7 Marines, as Company H took over Hill 111 and Company G defended the critical ground at Boulder City. At about 19:30 on 24 July the PVA attacked Hill 111 and soon cracked the perimeter now manned by Company H, 3/1 Marines. For about 50 minutes, the PVA clung to a salient on the hilltop, but then withdrew. After this flurry of action, apparently intended to divert attention from Boulder City, the PVA ignored Hill 111 until the morning of 25 July, when artillery fire battered the perimeter but no infantry assault followed.

The two PVA battalions attacking on the Marine right had their greatest success at Boulder City, seizing a portion of the trenchline defended by Company G, 3/1 Marines. In an attempt to exploit this foothold, the PVA attacked the Berlin and East Berlin gates, passages through the wire that the Marines had used to supply and reinforce the two outposts before both were overwhelmed. Cloud cover prevented aerial observers from supporting the troops protecting the gates, and the PVA managed to gain control of Berlin gate and mount a second determined assault on the Boulder City perimeter. Hand-to-hand fighting raged all along the 700 yards (640 m) of trench that Swigart's Marines still held. The company's ammunition ran low, and the plight of casualties became increasingly difficult as PVA fire killed two of Boulder City's eight corpsmen and wounded most of the others. By midnight, Swigart's company could muster no more than half its earlier strength, but it still clung to the rear slope of Boulder City. Casualties had further eroded the strength of the Boulder City garrison, when at 00:15 on the 25th, Company I, 3/1 Marines, moved toward the hill to reinforce Swigart's survivors. The PVA intercepted and correctly interpreted the coded radio message ordering the Company I Marines forward, thus obtaining information that enabled their artillery and mortars to wound or kill about a third of the reinforcements. Despite the deadly barrage, much of Company I reached Boulder City, joined forces with the remnants of Swigart's garrison, and took part in a counterattack that recaptured the hill by 03:30. Further reinforcements from Company E, 2/7 Marines, and Company E, 2/1 Marines, arrived by 05:30 to consolidate the position. A few PVA, however, continued to cling to positions on the slopes nearest the MLR. Since the PVA still controlled the approaches to Boulder City, they were able to mount another attack on that position at 08:20, 25 July. Fire from Marine mortars and artillery, and from the 90mm weapons of 10 tanks dug in on the Marine positions, played the key role in breaking up the new assault, although the last of the attackers did not withdraw until afternoon. The M-46 tanks proved deadly against advancing PVA troops, but also presented an inviting target for PVA artillery and mortar crews, who directed some 2,200 rounds at the armored vehicles. Aircraft also helped repulse the 25 July attack on Boulder City, as when F9F jets flew nine missions, guided by ground radar, against positions threatening Boulder City and nearby defensive strongpoints.

Before midnight on 24 July, in an attack perhaps loosely coordinated with the thrust at Boulder City, PVA forces hit the positions held by the 5th Marines. After probing the defenses of Outposts Dagmar and Esther, the PVA concentrated against the latter, manned by elements of Company H, 3rd Battalion, 5th Marines. The PVA tried to isolate Outpost Esther by shelling and patrolling the routes leading there from the MLR and succeeded in overrunning outer portions of the perimeter. The defenders prevailed because of the skillful use of their own weapons, including flamethrowers and the support of mortars, machine guns, tanks and artillery. The 3rd Battalion, 11th Marines, fired 3,886 rounds against PVA troops attacking Outpost Esther, and PVA gunners matched this volume of fire. The Marines suffered 12 killed and 98 wounded in the fighting that began at Dagmar and continued at Esther, while PVA casualties may have totaled 195 killed and 250 wounded.

Dawn on 26 July brought a lull in these last battles. PVA attempts to revive their attack by infiltrating reinforcements through the site of Outpost Berlin failed, thanks to accurate fire from Marine riflemen and machine gunners. The 1st Marines completed its relief of the 7th Marines at 13:30. That night, the PVA probed Boulder City for the last time, sending a patrol from Outpost Berlin that failed to penetrate the defensive wire and shortly after midnight dispatching another platoon that prowled about before Marine fire repulsed it.

== Aftermath ==
The Korean Armistice Agreement was signed at Panmunjom at 10:00 on 27 July and the ceasefire went into effect at 22:00.

Although the last of the PVA attacks seized Outposts Berlin and East Berlin, they failed to wrest Boulder City from its Marine defenders. Had the PVA captured Boulder City, they might have exploited it and seized the high ground to the south and east, from which they could have fired directly into the rear areas that sustained the 1st Marine Division in its positions beyond the Imjin River.

In fighting the Chinese to a standstill during July 1953, the division suffered 1,611 casualties, killed, wounded, and missing, the most severe losses since September/October 1952 when savage fighting had raged at Outposts Carson, Reno and Vegas and on the Hook. PVA losses during July 1953 may have exceeded 3,100.

Staff Sergeant Ambrosio Guillen of Company F, 2/7 Marines would be posthumously awarded the Medal of Honor for his actions on 25 July.
