= 174th Regiment =

174th Regiment may refer to:

- 174th Field Regiment, Royal Artillery
- 174th Infantry Regiment (United States)

== American Civil War regiments ==
- 174th New York Infantry Regiment
- 174th Ohio Infantry Regiment
- 174th Pennsylvania Infantry Regiment

== See also ==
- 174th Brigade (disambiguation)
