= Ambrosio Guillen =

United States Marine, recipient of the Medal of Honor (1929–1953)

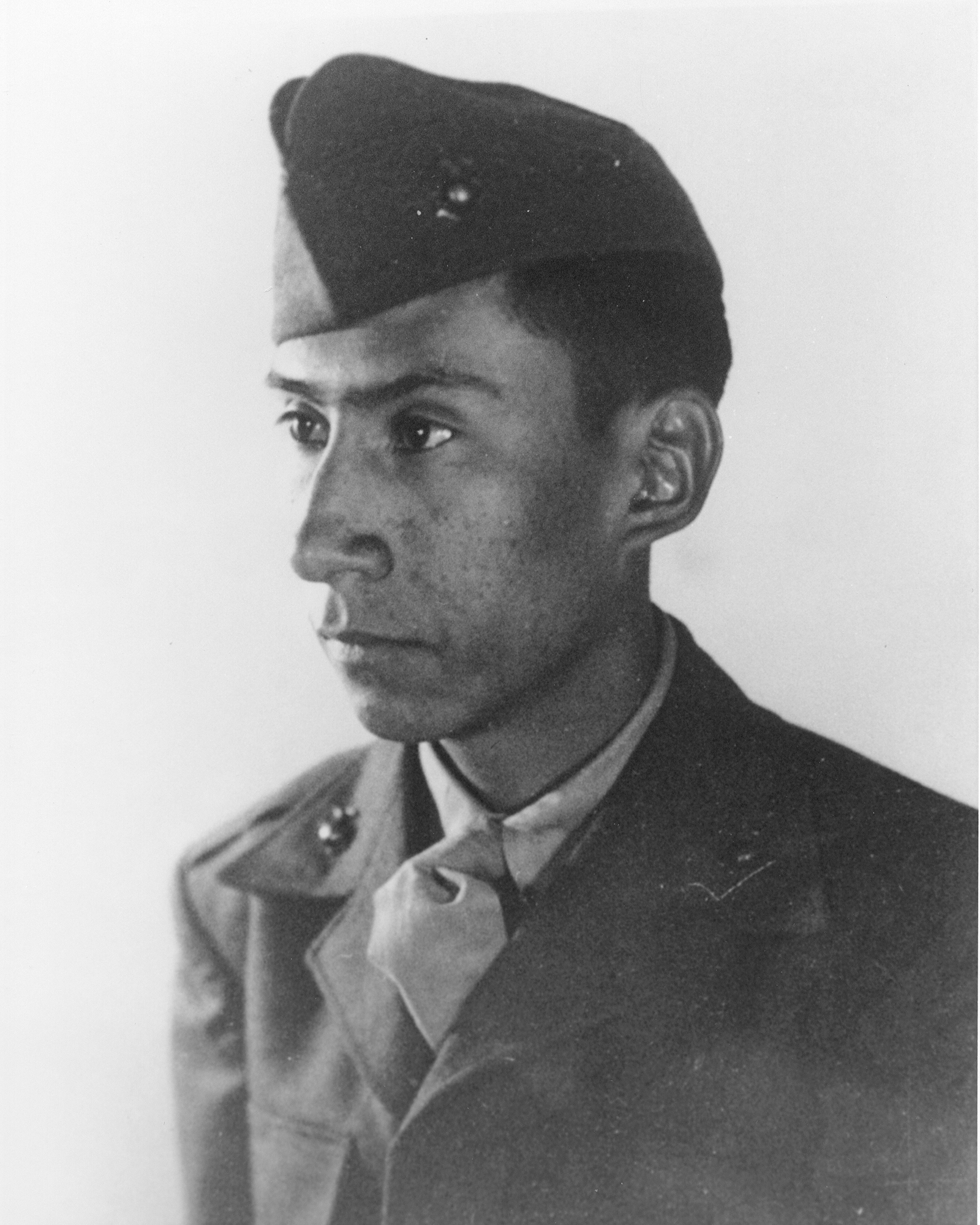
- Guillen in c. 1953
- Born: December 7, 1929; La Junta, Colorado, United States
- Died: July 25, 1953 (aged 23) near Panmunjom, Korea
- Burial place: Fort Bliss National Cemetery
- Military career
- Allegiance: United States
- Branch: United States Marine Corps
- Service years: c. 1947–1953
- Rank: Staff Sergeant
- Units: Company F, 2nd Battalion, 7th Marines, 1st Marine Division
- Conflicts: Korean War: Battle of the Berlin Outposts and Boulder City (DOW)
- Awards: Medal of Honor; Purple Heart

Ambrosio Guillen (December 7, 1929 – July 25, 1953) was a United States Marine who was posthumously awarded the Medal of Honor—the United States' highest military award for valor—for his heroic actions and sacrifice of life on July 25, 1953, two days before the ceasefire, during the Korean War. He was responsible for his infantry platoon's turning an overwhelming enemy attack into a defeat and disorderly retreat.

== Early years ==
Ambrosio Guillen was born on December 7, 1929, in La Junta, Colorado. He came from a Mexican-American family and grew up in El Paso, Texas, where he attended Bowie High School.

Guillen enlisted in the United States Marine Corps at the age of 18. He completed recruit training at San Diego, California, and was assigned to the 7th Marine Regiment. Later he was chosen for Sea School, and after graduation, served on the USS Curtiss. Following his tour of sea duty, he was appointed a drill instructor at Marine Corps Recruit Depot San Diego.

He trained two recruit honor platoons and was given a Letter of Appreciation by his Commanding General. In that letter, MajGen John T. Walker stated, "your success in training these two platoons has demonstrated your outstanding ability as a leader." That ability was proven in combat soon after SSgt. Guillen arrived in Korea.

== Korean War ==
On July 25, 1953, while defending a forward outpost against a large enemy attack, near Songuch-on, Korea, SSgt. Guillen and his platoon were able to defeat the enemy and put them in retreat. After the fighting, he died from being wounded during the battle. For his heroic leadership and sacrifice of life, he was awarded the Medal of Honor. The Medal or Honor awarded to SSgt. Guillen was presented to his parents on his behalf by the Secretary of the Navy Charles S. Thomas, during a special ceremony in his office on August 18, 1954.

== Medal of Honor ==
Guillen's Medal of Honor citation reads:

The President of the United States in the name of The Congress takes pride in presenting the MEDAL OF HONOR posthumously to

STAFF SERGEANT AMBROSIO GUILLEN
UNITED STATES MARINE CORPS

for service as set forth in the following

CITATION:

For conspicuous gallantry and intrepidity at the risk of his life above and beyond the call of duty while serving as a platoon Sergeant of Company F, Second Battalion, Seventh Marines, First Marine Division (Reinforced), in action against enemy aggressor forces in Korea on July 25, 1953. Participating in the defense of an outpost forward of the main line of resistance, Staff Sergeant GUILLEN maneuvered his platoon over unfamiliar terrain in the face of hostile fire and placed his men in fighting positions. With his unit pinned down when the outpost was attacked under cover of darkness by an estimated force of two enemy battalions supported by mortar and artillery fire, he deliberately exposed himself to the heavy barrage and attacks to direct his men in defending their positions and personally supervise the treatment and evacuation of the wounded. Inspired by his leadership, the platoon quickly rallied and engaged the enemy force in fierce hand-to-hand combat. Although critically wounded during the course of the battle, Staff Sergeant Guillen refused medical aid and continued to direct his men throughout the remainder of the engagement until the enemy was defeated and thrown into disorderly retreat. Succumbing to his wounds within a few hours, Staff Sergeant GUILLEN, by his outstanding courage and indomitable fighting spirit, was directly responsible for the success of his platoon in repelling a numerically superior enemy force. His personal valor reflects the highest credit upon himself and enhances the finest traditions of the United States Naval Service. He gallantly gave his life for his country.

/S/ DWIGHT D. EISENHOWER

== Awards and decorations ==

1st row	Medal of Honor		
2nd row	Purple Heart	Combat Action Ribbon Retroactively Awarded, 1999	Navy Unit Commendation
3rd row	Marine Corps Good Conduct Medal	National Defense Service Medal	Korean Service Medal with 2 Campaign stars
4th row	Korean Presidential Unit Citation	United Nations Service Medal Korea	Korean War Service Medal Retroactively Awarded, 2003

== Burial ==
After the Korean War truce, his body was escorted to the United States by his brother, who had been serving in the Far East with the United States Army. SSgt. Guillen was buried in Fort Bliss National Cemetery on October 20, 1953, in El Paso, Texas.

== Public namings ==
- The Ambrosio Guillen Texas State Veterans Home in El Paso is named in his honor.
- Guillen Middle School in the El Paso Independent School District.

== See also ==
- List of Korean War Medal of Honor recipients
- List of Hispanic Medal of Honor recipients
- Hispanics in the United States Marine Corps
