= 136th Infantry Division (People's Republic of China) =

136th Division (1948–60) 136th Army Division (1960-85) 136th Infantry Division (1985-99) 136th Reserve Infantry Division of Henan Provincial Military District (1999-)
- Active: 1948.11 -
- Country: People's Republic of China
- Branch: People's Liberation Army
- Type: Division
- Role: Infantry
- Part of: Henan Provincial Military District
- Garrison/HQ: Kaifeng, Henan
- Engagements: Chinese Civil War, Korean War

The 136th Division (Chinese: 第136师) was created in November 1948 under the Regulation of the Redesignations of All Organizations and Units of the Army, issued by Central Military Commission on November 1, 1948, basing on the 25th Division, 9th Column of the Fourth Field Army. Its history could be traced to the 13th Brigade of Jidong Military District formed in November 1945.

In the composition of 46th Corps it took part in the Chinese Civil War, including the Winter Offensive of 1947 in Northeast China, Liaoshen Campaign, Pingjin Campaign, and Hengbao Campaign.

The division was composed of 406th, 407th, and 408th Infantry Regiments.

From August 1952 to October 1955 the division was deployed to North Korea as a part of the People's Volunteer Army.

In June 1953, 517th Artillery Regiment was activated and attached to the division.

In October 1955, the division left North Korea along with the corps HQ and was relocated in Jiaohe, Jilin Province.

In May 1957, the 407th Regiment was reconstituted into reduced status. In February 1960, the 407th Regiment was reestablished to full strength.

In April 1960 the division was redesignated as the 136th Army Division (Chinese: 陆军第136师). The division was then composed of:

- Divisional Headquarters
- 406th Regiment
- 407th Regiment
- 408th Regiment
- 517th Artillery Regiment

In June 1962, the 136th Army Division was reconstituted as a division category B.

In August 1969, 517th Artillery Regiment was redesignated as the Artillery Regiment, 136th Army Division.

From June to July 1975, the division was relocated to Xuzhou, Jiangsu.

In September 1978, the division was relocated to Linyi, Shandong.

In October 1985, the division was reconstituted as the 136th Infantry Division(Chinese: 步兵第136师) and maintained as a northern infantry division, category B;

- The 406th Regiment was disbanded.
- The 409th Regiment attached to the division from the disbanding 137th Army Division.

The division was transferred to the 67th Army following 46th Army Corps' disbandment.

From then the division was composed of:

- Divisional Headquarters
- 407th Regiment
- 408th Regiment
- 409th Regiment
- Artillery Regiment

In 1999, the division merged with the Reserve Infantry Division of Kaifeng in Kaifeng, Henan and reconstituted as the 136th Reserve Infantry Division of Henan Provincial Military District(Chinese: 河南省军区预备役步兵第136师).

The division now maintains as a reserve infantry formation, locating in Kaifeng, Henan. The division now composed of:

- Divisional Headquarters - Kaifeng, Henan
- 407th Regiment
- 408th Regiment - Zhoukou, Henan
- 409th Regiment - Qingyun, Henan
- Artillery Regiment - Pingdingshan, Henan
- Anti-Aircraft Artillery Regiment - Shangqiu, Henan
