= 137th Division (People's Republic of China) =

137th Division (1948–60) 137th Army Division (1960-85)
- Active: 1948.11 - 1985.10
- Country: People's Republic of China
- Branch: People's Liberation Army
- Type: Division
- Role: Infantry
- Part of: 46th Army Corps
- Garrison/HQ: Jiao County, Shandong
- Engagements: Chinese Civil War, Korean War

The 137th Division (Chinese: 第137师) was created in November 1948 under the Regulation of the Redesignations of All Organizations and Units of the Army, issued by Central Military Commission on November 1, 1948, basing on the 26th Division, 9th Column of the Fourth Field Army. Its history could be traced to the 13th Brigade of Jidong Military District formed in November 1945.

In the composition of 46th Corps it took part in the Chinese Civil War, including the Winter Offensive of 1947 in Northeast China, Liaoshen Campaign, Pingjin Campaign, and Hengbao Campaign.

The division was composed of 409th, 410th, and 411th Infantry Regiments.

From August 1952 to October 1955 the division was deployed to North Korea as a part of the People's Volunteer Army.

In June 1953, 518th Artillery Regiment was activated and attached to the division.

In October 1955, the division left North Korea along with the corps HQ and was relocated in Jilin City, Jilin Province.

In May 1957, the 410th Regiment was reconstituted into reduced status. In February 1960, the 410th Regiment was reestablished to full strength.

In April 1960 the division was redesignated as the 137th Army Division (Chinese: 陆军第137师). The division was then composed of:

- Divisional Headquarters
- 410th Regiment
- 411th Regiment
- 412th Regiment
- 518th Artillery Regiment

In June 1962, the 137th Army Division was reconstituted as a division category B.

In August 1969, 518th Artillery Regiment was redesignated as the Artillery Regiment, 137th Army Division.

From June to July 1975, the division was relocated to Xuzhou, Jiangsu.

In September 1978, the division was relocated to Jiao County, Shandong.

In October 1985, the division was disbanded:

- Headquarters, 137th Army Division was reconstituted as the Headquarters, Artillery Brigade, 26th Army;
- The 409th Regiment was transferred to the 136th Infantry Division;
- Other units and subunits of the division were disbanded.
