= Battle for Outpost Vegas =

Battle during the Korean War

Coordinates: 38.005°N 126.798°E

- Part of the Korean War
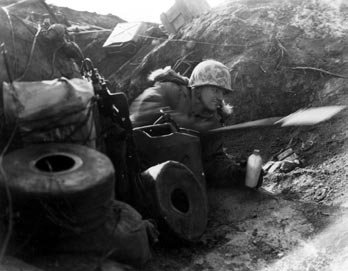
- A U.S. Marine in a trench atop Outpost Vegas.
Date	26–30 March 1953
Location	Yeoncheon County, Korea – Nevada Cities Outposts, Main Line of Resistance, Western Korea
Result	US holds Outposts Carson and Vegas, China takes Outpost Reno

Belligerents
United Nations: United States; South Korea	China

Commanders and leaders
(United States) Edwin A. Pollock (United States) Lewis W. Walt	Zheng Zhishi

Strength
(United States) 1st Marine Division; 1st Tank Battalion; 2nd Battalion 1st Marines; 3rd Battalion 1st Marines; 1st Battalion 5th Marines; 11th Marines (Artillery) (First Republic of Korea) ROK Marines (United States) 1st Marine Aircraft Wing	46th Army: 120th Division; 358th Regiment; 1st Battalion; 3rd Battalion

Casualties and losses
(United States) 141 killed in action 29 died of wounds 104 missing 701 wounded (First Republic of Korea) 26 killed in action 5 missing 97 wounded Chinese estimate 1,390 killed or wounded 25 captured	UN estimate: 1,351 killed in action 3,631 wounded 4 captured

The battle for Outpost Vegas took place during the Korean War between the armed forces of the United Nations Command (UN) and China from 26 to 30 March 1953, four months before the end of the Korean War. Vegas was one of three outposts called the Nevada Cities north of the Main Line of Resistance (MLR), the United Nations defensive line which stretched roughly around the latitude 38th Parallel. Vegas, and the outposts it supported, Reno and Carson, were manned by elements of the 1st Marine Division. On 26 March 1953 the Chinese People's Volunteer Army (PVA) launched an attack on the Nevada Cities, including Vegas, in an attempt to better the position of China and North Korea in the Panmunjon peace talks which were occurring at the time, and to gain more territory for North Korea when its borders would be solidified. The battle raged for five days until PVA forces halted their advance after capturing one outpost north of the MLR on 30 March, but were repelled from Vegas. The battle for Outpost Vegas and the surrounding outposts are considered the bloodiest fighting to date in western Korea during the Korean War. It is estimated that there were over 1,000 American casualties and twice that number of Chinese during the Battle for Outpost Vegas. The battle is also known for the involvement of Sergeant Reckless, a horse in a USMC recoilless rifle platoon who transported ammunition and the wounded during the U.S. defense of outpost Vegas.

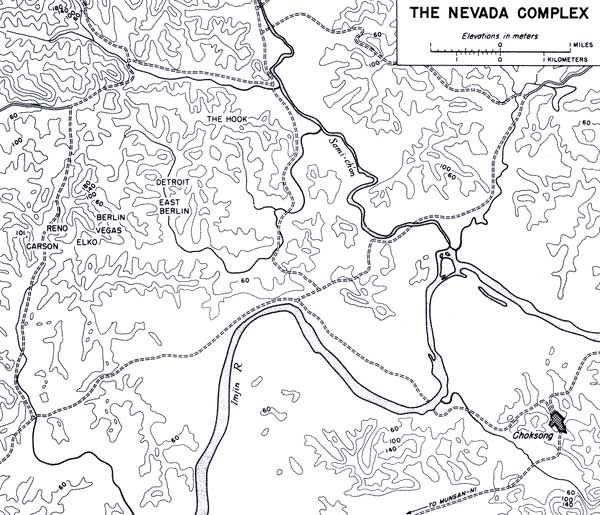
Map of the Nevada Complex

== Prelude ==
In March 1952, the 1st Marine Division redeployed from east-central to western Korea, to join US I Corps where they were assigned a 35-mile (56 km) sector to defend on the Main Line of Resistance (MLR). The specific sector on the MLR was called the Jamestown Line. This sector was located between PVA forces to the north and the South Korean capital of Seoul to the south. The 1st Division was supported by the 1st Marine Aircraft Wing, who had also been recently deployed to western Korea.

1st Battalion, 5th Marines defended the Nevada Cities, reportedly coined as such by Lieutenant colonel Tony Caputa because "it's a gamble if we can hold them." Lieutenant colonel Jonas M. Platt commanded 1st Battalion, while Colonel Lew Walt commanded the 5th Marine Regiment. The 1st Division's formations from left to right comprised the Republic of Korea Army (ROK) Kimpo Provisional Regiment, 1st Amphibian Tractor Battalion, 1st Marines and the 5th Marines. The 1st Marines had replaced the 7th Marines earlier in March. The 1st Marine Division was supported by separate units of artillery, tanks, and aircraft. The 11th Marines commanded by Colonel Mills provided artillery support. Three of four companies of the 1st Tank Battalion supported with M46 Pattons, flame tanks, and retrievers. The 1st Marine Air Wing, with 6,400 personal located throughout Korea, supported with helicopter evacuations of night frontline combat casualties, artillery spotting flights, airborne control of airstrikes and routine liaison and reconnaissance, administrative, and resupply flights.

Opposing the Marines was the PVA line of formations, from left to right: the 19th Division of the 65th Army, who had three regiments forward; and the 120th Division of the 40th Army (under the control of the 46th Army), who had three regiments forward. According to the 1st Marine Division Diaries, the Chinese were active in patrolling and ambushing in defense of positions during the first part of March. During the last part of March the PVA began "limited objective attacks" against US outposts. These attacks varied from a squad to two battalions in strength against outposts Reno and Vegas, in order to deny the US observation into the PVA rear areas.

I Corps commander General Bruce C. Clarke advocated defense on the hills north of the MLR to deny the tactical advantage they offered to the PVA. Vegas was the highest of the "Nevada Cities" and 1,310-yard (1,200 m) north from the MLR. "From North to South this observation included in its 180-degree sweep, enemy hill mass 57 to the right, friendly outpost Berlin, the MLR, key Marine defense highpoints, Hills 229 and 181 in the 1st Marines sector, and intervening terrain." However, soldiers on Vegas could not see Reno. A rifle platoon of 40 Marines and two Navy corpsmen manned each outpost. 250-yard (230 m) of trench line surrounded the outpost, which ranged from 4–8-foot (1.2–2.4 m) deep. Beyond the trenches two parallel lines of barbed wire lay, linked with more parallel aprons of wire connecting the two, sometimes referred to as the "Canadian system. Outpost Reno, formerly Outpost Bruce, had been the scene of intense fighting from 5–6 September 1952 during the Battle of Bunker Hill and three Marines were awarded the Medal of Honor for their actions there, two posthumously.

The three outposts of Carson, Reno and Vegas differed from one another according to their location, the terrain to be defended, and the threat they faced. Outpost Carson, on the left, guarded a largely barren hilltop where a cave provided living quarters for the Marines, who manned an oval perimeter protected by barbed wire and including bunkers, tunnels and a main trench with fighting holes. Except for the slope nearest the Jamestown Line, where a deeper entrenchment was being dug, the main trench on Carson averaged 5 feet (1.5 m) deep by 2 feet (0.61 m) wide. Most of the 28 fighting holes had excellent fields of fire, though the overhead cover on some of them had reduced the opening for observation and firing. During darkness, two listening posts covered the likeliest avenues of PVA attack, from the Ungok hills to the west and Hill 67 to the north. Reno, in the center, was the most vulnerable of the three. It not only lay closest to PVA lines, but also occupied a ridge that forced the defenders into a perimeter vaguely resembling the wishbone of a turkey, open end to the north. As at Carson, a cave served as living quarters and might also become a last-ditch redoubt. A tunnel provided access to the cave from the main trench, which varied from 5–7 feet (1.5–2.1 m) deep. The Marines at Reno built no bunkers, relying exclusively on fighting holes in the trenches and, as a last resort, the cave itself. Outpost Reno had limited fields of fire in the direction of PVA-held Hill 67, also called Arrowhead Hill, but Outpost Carson, on the left, provided fire support in this area. As a result, the approach that seemed to pose the greatest danger to Reno's defenders followed a ridge extending generally southward from Hill 150. Like the Marines defending the other outposts, those at Reno relied on C-rations and tossed the empty cans into nearby gullies. At night, when the tin cans clattered, the source of the noise might be PVA moving close to attack behind a sudden barrage. To the south of Reno lay Reno Block, an L-shaped trench with a small bunker at the end of the shorter leg and a machine gun position at the point where the legs joined. At night a reinforced squad manned the blocking position, which served as a listening post, helped screen the movement of supplies and reinforcements, and provided a rallying point for relief columns ambushed by PVA patrols. Perched on a hilltop, Reno Block afforded excellent visibility, but conversely it could easily be seen from PVA lines. Marines manning Reno's east–west trench could fire in support of the blocking position, as could the garrison at Carson. To the right of Reno loomed Outpost Vegas, which as the tallest of the three, afforded the best fields of observation. Barbed wire and a well-constructed trench encircled the egg-shaped perimeter on Vegas, with its one warming and two living bunkers. Although the fields of fire on Vegas were less than ideal, handicapped in places by a steeply pitched slope too irregular for grazing fire and also by the small firing apertures in some of the covered fighting holes, weapons there could support Reno with long-range fire. By day, Vegas proved a magnet for sniper fire and harassment by mortars and artillery, forcing the Marines to remain under cover.

UN intelligence did not expect a PVA attack during late March. Winter had turned to spring, and with the change of temperature, the melting snow turned the roads to mud, making logistics near to impossible. The newly deployed 1st Marines expected a comparatively quiet front in western Korea to the fighting they experienced elsewhere.Furthermore, the lines of resistance had for most of the war remained static. There are different reasons for the PVA attack to come on 26 March. According to Elliot Akermann, the Chinese wanted to capture the Nevada Cities north of the MLR in order to gain leverage at the Panmunjom peace talks. If the PVA gained a victory here, they could threaten Seoul, thus embarrassing and putting pressure on the UN negotiators at the talks. For Lieutenant colonel Pat Meid and Major James M. Yingling, the PVA wanted to take the hills and ridgelines adjacent to the Marine MLR. This would then better their position at the peace talks, and solidify captured territory for North Korea after peace was achieved.

== Battle ==
=== 26 March: Chinese attack ===
Until the end of March, the PVA had shown no sign of attacking the Nevada Cities outposts and were reluctant to engage the Marines' patrols unless they engaged in their own positions. Meid and Yingling wrote that the Marines were as follows: "Operation orders read that the Marines were to make contact, capture prisoners, and deny the ground to the enemy."

The PVA offensive began on the night of 26 March against outposts Vegas, Carson, and Reno, in conjunction with attacking nearby outposts Dagmar, Esther, Bunker and Hedy. At 19:00, small arms and machine gun fire erupted from the PVA positions on the 1st Battalion, 5th Marines positions. This was followed by 15 minutes of mortar and artillery fire on the 5th Marines rear areas and supply routes along the MLR. At 19:10, over 3,500 PVA soldiers from the 358th Regiment, 120th Division attacked outposts Carson, Reno, and Vegas. One of the PVA companies engaged the Marines atop outpost Vegas. Marine artillery responded to the PVA attacks by firing "protective boxes" and VT proximity fuses around the outposts and routes of attack. When VT was fired at PVA soldiers who were very close to the Marine positions – as was often the case – the Marines would run into previously dug caves on the opposite slope of the hills. There they would wait until the overwhelming numbers of PVA soldiers were pushed off the hill by the VT shells, and then the Marines would reemerge from the caves to man the defenses. Overwhelming PVA numbers and supporting fire forced the Marines on Vegas to abandon the outer ring of less easily defended trenches.

At the same time during the evening of the 26th, Marine tanks and artillery had been positioned on the MLR to support an infantry raid to destroy PVA bunkers scheduled for the next morning on the 27th, designated "Operation Clambake." It was pure chance that they were positioned there just as the PVA launched an attack in the same front.

By 19:40, communications wire between Vegas and 1st Battalion Command Post had been lost because of PVA artillery and mortar fire striking in the rear areas of the Marine positions. Occasionally Marine engineers would repair the wires until the next barrage destroyed them again. By 19:50, more than 100 PVA soldiers occupied the lower trenches of outpost Vegas, where they could survive Marine artillery bombardments. Ten minutes later, the Marines at outpost Vegas withdrew in face of overwhelming numbers of PVA. A little over an hour later at 21:29 a Marine platoon was sent to Vegas to support the Marines who had just withdrawn. Yet even before they were able to get to the outpost's hill, they were pinned down from engulfing fire from nearby PVA. Three minutes before midnight, 1st Battalion lost communications permanently with the Marines near outpost Vegas. All of the Marines on Vegas were killed or captured.

After five hours of fierce combat, the PVA attack had been partially successful. They had captured two outposts (Vegas and Reno) and Marine reinforcements to those outposts had been thwarted. Carson was still controlled by the Marines. Shortly after midnight, F Company 3rd Battalion, 5th Marines made an effort to recapture Vegas, but the lead platoon only managed to get close enough to confirm that Vegas was in PVA hands. By 03:00 on 27 March, these units had retreated back to the MLR. Wounded Marines were either carried to the aid stations of the 1st or 3rd Battalion, 5th Marines, or in severe cases, evacuated by helicopter to Navy ships in Inchon harbor. After eight hours of fighting in and around the Nevada Cities, the PVA had endured an estimated 600 casualties, four times more than those of the Marines.

=== 27 March: USMC reorganization and counterattack ===
After the Marines abandoned their initial attempts to fight their way to Vegas, Major general Edwin A. Pollock commander of the 1st Marine Division sent observation planes to direct fire for ground artillery and Air Force and Marine planes. Their fire was directed at PVA artillery behind their front lines and at fortifications atop of captured outposts Reno and Vegas. On 27 March over 60 fire missions were called. Marine mortars, artillery, and self-propelled guns contributed to the bombardment. Over two dozen Air Force and Marine aircraft also flew missions against PVA positions on the captured outposts, including Grumman F9F Panther jets.

Instead of attacking both Reno and Vegas outposts, Pollock ordered attacks to be concentrated just on Vegas. This decision was made at 09:00 as the bombardment climaxed against PVA positions on both outposts. Company D, 2nd Battalion, 5th Marines was the first to assault Vegas, but they never reached their objective, and retreated with only 9 able-bodied soldiers remaining.

At the same time, D company was pinned down while en route to Vegas. By 13:05, D company had reached the lower slopes of outpost Vegas. By 13:22, the Marines had "gone over the top" on the outpost's hill. E Company soon followed and passed through D Company's ranks to secure the trenches and crest of Vegas. At 18:00, F Company was still 400-yard (370 m) behind the other companies from outpost Vegas. After ten hours of intense fighting on 27 March, the Marines had held the lower slopes of Outpost Vegas, PVA soldiers held the opposite slope of outpost Vegas but no-one held the summit.

=== 28 March: Fight for Vegas summit and final USMC capture ===
On the morning of 28 March for 23 minutes the 1st Marine Aircraft Wing dropped some 28 tons of bombs on outpost Vegas. Their bombs landed 450-foot (140 m) from the lower trenches occupied by the Marines. Up until that time, Marine commanders had hoped they could recapture the outposts with defenses intact in order to be used at another time. But after the unsuccessful Marine attacks the night before, they concluded that the outposts could not be retaken without the necessary fire support and so destroying the facilities of outpost Vegas. At 13:13 E Company gained control of outpost Vegas after heavy fighting and by 14:55 the outpost was secured. At 23:00 more than 200 wounded Marines were kept at a makeshift hospital on the slope of Vegas. Soon after the hospital staff learned that a PVA formation estimated at battalion strength was moving in their vicinity. Armed with as many grenades as they could carry, wounded Marines threw the grenades down the slope in an attempt to blunt the PVA maneuver.

=== 29–30 March: Conclusion of battle ===
For two days from the end of 29 March to the end of 30 March, PVA formations continued to attack and counterattack in an effort to take back Vegas. According to Akermann, the PVA "went through 4,000 men" in two regiments. The attacks eventually halted on 30 March because the PVA simply could not afford to lose any more soldiers. By 11 am on 30 March, as Marine artillery attacked PVA positions, the attacks finally stopped. The battle for Outpost Vegas was over.

== Aftermath ==
In early May, the 1st Marine Division was replaced by the Turkish Brigade, and the Marines went into reserve after almost a week of heavy fighting in and around the "Nevada Cities" outposts.

According to the 1st Marine Division diaries, American casualties in the month of March were at 141 killed in action, 29 died of wounds, 701 wounded and evacuated, 510 wounded and not evacuated, and 104 missing in action. PVA forces suffered 1,351 killed in action, 3,631 wounded, and four captured. The Korean Marines had a minor presence during the battle for outpost Vegas, their casualties 26 killed in action, 97 wounded in action, and five missing in action.

According to Akermann, the 1st Marine Division had 1,488 killed, wounded, or missing in the month of March. In the "Nevada Cities" sector, the 1st Marine Division had 1,015 casualties (killed, missing, wounded), which was nearly 70% of their total strength. 156 Marines were killed, 441 wounded and evacuated, 360 wounded but not evacuated, and 98 missing including 19 captured. These casualties were from Marines in action; non-combatant casualties are not included.

The PVA would renew their attack on the Nevada Complex on 25 May and after four days of heavy fighting the UN Command ordered that it be abandoned.

== Staff Sergeant Reckless ==
A young Marine purchased a horse for $250 in October 1952 which was trained as an ammunition carrier for a Recoilless Rifle platoon in the 5th Marines. Sergeant Reckless, as she was later called after the nature of the recoilless rifle and the platoon's radio call sign, went with the 5th Marines as they were put in support of a string of outposts on the MLR. It was there where she had her first taste of battle. Reckless had been moving about the Nevada Cities when the PVA attacked on 26 March 1953. When artillery began to hit Outposts Vegas and the support network behind it on the MLR, Reckless ran to the nearest bunker, where she remained clearly shocked by the impact of war. The next morning on the 26th, as the 5th Marines recovered from the previous day's fighting, Reckless was readied for her duties as ammunition carrier. Before dawn Reckless was fitted with 8 recoilless rifle projectiles, 192 pounds of weight distributed across her back. Reckless was then led by the other Marines in her platoon to the platoon's firing positions opposite of the southern slopes of outpost Vegas. She continued to haul ammunition, and at one point wounded Marines, up and down the hill.

== See also ==
History of the United States Marine Corps
