= 2nd Forestry Engineering Division (People's Republic of China) =

2nd Forestry Engineering Division (1952)
- Active: 1952.8 - 1952.10
- Country: People's Republic of China
- Branch: People's Liberation Army
- Type: Division
- Role: Production

2nd Forestry Engineering Division (Chinese: 林业工程第2师) was activated in August 1952. The division was composed of:

- Division HQ: former headquarters of 156th Division;
- 4th Regiment: former 522nd Regiment, 174th Division, 58th Corps;
- 5th Regiment: organized from former Liangguang Column;
- 6th Regiment: personnel from the former 159th Division.

The division is a production unit, after its formation the unit moved to Hainan for rubber plantation.

Soon after its arrival in Hainan, the division was demobilized. The division's further fate is unknown.
