= 138th Division (1st Formation) (People's Republic of China) =

138th Division (1948–1953)
- Active: 1948.11 - 1953.2
- Country: People's Republic of China
- Branch: People's Liberation Army
- Type: Division
- Role: Infantry
- Part of: 46th Corps
- Engagements: Chinese Civil War

The 138th Division (Chinese: 第138师) was created in November 1948 under the Regulation of the Redesignations of All Organizations and Units of the Army, issued by Central Military Commission on November 1, 1948, basing on the 27th Division, 9th Column of Fourth Field Army. Its history could be traced to the 9th Independent Brigade of Jidong Military District formed in August 1947.

In the composition of 46th Corps it took part in the Chinese Civil War, including the Liaoshen Campaign and Pingjin Campaign.

The division was composed of 412th, 413th, and 414th Infantry Regiments.

In December 1950, half of the divisional assets and Headquarters, 413th Infantry Regiment were detached to activate the PLAAF's Flight School in Changchun, Jilin. This school later became the Second Aviation School.

In September 1952, the division was detached from 46th Corps and transferred to the People's Liberation Army Navy's control.

- In February 1953 the division was formally inactivated: Headquarters, 138th Division was detached to activate 2nd Naval Aviation Division. All three infantry regiments were transferred back to Army's control and moved into Korea as replacement units of the People's Volunteer Army: 412th and 413th Regiments were attached to 38th Corps, while 414th was attached to 50th Corps.
