= 14th Army Group =

Field formation of the People's Liberation Army during the Chinese Civil War

14th Army Group (1949)
- Chinese: 第14兵团
- Active: 1949.3-7 (inactive)
- Country: (China)
- Part of: Fourth Field Army
- Engagements: Chinese Civil War

Commanders
- Notable commanders: Liu Yalou

The 14th Army Group (Chinese: 第14兵团) was a field formation of the People's Liberation Army during the Chinese Civil War. It was organized in March 1949.

At its activation, the Army Group's commander was Liu Yalou, commissar was Mo Wenhua, 1st deputy commander Huang Yongsheng, deputy commissar Wu Faxian.

The Army Group was composed of 39th, 41st, and 42nd Corps.

In July 1949, roughly 3 months after its activation, the 14th Army Group was inactivated and converted as headquarters, People's Liberation Army Air Force.

It should be clearly noted that William W. Whitson, writing with Chen-Hsia Huang in The Chinese High Command, 1972, lists a 14th Army (rather than Army Group) under the Fourth Field Army in the June–September 1949 period, and gives its composition as the 48th Corps (142nd, 143rd, and 144th Divisions) and the 54th Corps (160th, 161st, and 162nd Divisions). He lists the commander during that period as Ch'en Ch'i-han.

== Bibliography ==
- William W. Whitson, with Chen-hsia Huang. (1973) The Chinese high command; a history of Communist military politics, 1927-71. Foreword by Lucian W. Pye.
