= 159th Division (People's Republic of China) =

159th Division (1948–49)
- Active: 1948.11 - 1949.7
- Country: People's Republic of China
- Branch: People's Liberation Army
- Type: Division
- Role: Infantry
- Part of: 46th Corps
- Engagements: Chinese Civil War

The 159th Division (Chinese: 第159师) was created in November 1948 under the Regulation of the Redesignations of All Organizations and Units of the Army, issued by Central Military Commission on 1 November 1948, basing on the 7th Independent Division of Jichareliao Military District, formed in February.

The division was a part of the 46th Corps. Under the flag of the 159th division it took part in the Chinese Civil War. In July 1949 the division was disbanded. Its remnant was reorganized as the 6th Regiment, 2nd Forestry Engineering Division in 1952.

As of disbandment, the division was composed of:

- 475th Regiment;
- 476th Regiment;
- 477th Regiment.
