= 174th Division (People's Republic of China) =

174th Division (1949-52)
- Active: 1949.2 - 1952.12
- Country: People's Republic of China
- Branch: People's Liberation Army
- Type: Division
- Role: Infantry
- Part of: 58th Corps
- Engagements: Chinese Civil War

The 174th Division (Chinese: 第174师) was created in February 1949 under the Regulation of the Redesignations of All Organizations and Units of the Army, issued by Central Military Commission on November 1, 1948, basing on the 1st Sub-district of Tongbai Military District. Its history could be traced to 6th Independent Brigade of Jinan Military District formed in February 1947.

The division was composed of 520th, 521st and 522nd Infantry Regiments. As a part of 58th Corps, during the Chinese Civil War the division mainly focusing on the Campaign to Suppress Bandits in Southwestern China.

In late July 1950, 174th Division, reinforced with 15th Independent Infantry Regiment of Henan Military District, was transferred to Guangxi and merged with Yishan Military Sub-district.

During its deployment in Yishan area, the division (and the military sub-district) eliminated a total of 38,768 bandits.

In June 1952, 522nd Infantry Regiment was transferred to 2nd Forestry Engineering Division as 6th Regiment.

In December 1952 the division was disbanded.
