= 174th Street =

174th Street may refer to the following stations of the New York City Subway in the Bronx:

- 174th–175th Streets (IND Concourse Line); serving the B and D trains
- 174th Street (IRT White Plains Road Line); serving the 2 and 5 trains
- 174th Street (IRT Third Avenue Line); demolished

== See also ==
- So Long, 174th Street, a Broadway musical opened April 27, 1976
