= Battle of the Nevada Complex =

Battle of the Korean War

Coordinates: 38.005°N 126.798°E

- Part of the Korean War
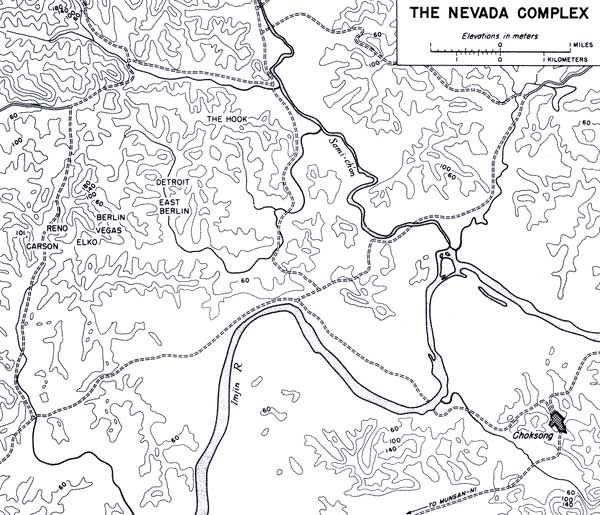
- Map of the Nevada Complex
Date	25–29 May 1953
Location	Northeast of Panmunjom, Korea
Result	See aftermath

Belligerents
United Nations: Turkey; United States	China

Commanders and leaders
(Turkey) Brig. Gen. Sırrı Acar (United States) Samuel Tankersley Williams	Unknown

Units involved
(Turkey) Turkish Brigade (United States) 1st Tank Battalion (United States) 14th Infantry Regiment (United States) 35th Infantry Regiment	120th Division

Casualties and losses
151 killed	1,156 casualties

The Battle of the Nevada Complex was fought between 25 and 29 May 1953 during the Korean War between United Nations Command (UN) and Chinese forces over several front line outposts. After suffering heavy losses the UN abandoned the positions.

== Background ==
From 26 to 30 March 1953 the Chinese People's Volunteer Army (PVA) had mounted a series of attacks on the US 1st Marine Division outpost positions north of the Jamestown Line, US I Corps' Main line of resistance (MLR) known as the Nevada Complex. The Nevada Complex was located on low hills, approximately 10 miles (16 km) northeast of Panmunjom and the same distance north of Munsan-ni. The PVA had seized Outpost Reno, but had been pushed back from Outpost Vegas and both sides had suffered heavy losses in the battle.

In early May 1953 the US 25th Infantry Division moved to the US I Corps zone in exchange for the US 2nd Infantry Division, it had relieved the US 1st Marine Division on the frontline. 25th Division commander General Samuel Tankersley Williams assigned the responsibility for the defense of the Nevada Complex and neighboring outposts, Berlin and East Berlin, to the attached Turkish Brigade under Brigadier general Sirri Acar on 5 May.

Facing the Turkish forces were the three Chinese People's Volunteer Army (PVA) regiments, the 358th, 359th and 360th of the 120th Division, 46th Army. Since the PVA seizure of Outpost Reno in March, the area had remained quiet except for the customary probes and patrols. The PVA capability of mounting a large-scale attack upon the Nevada Complex Outposts: Vegas, Elko and Carson and other nearby hills posed a constant threat that demanded constant vigilance. Tactically, possession of the Nevada Complex by the PVA would mean improved observation of the Jamestown Line. Since I Corps regarded these defensive positions as critical, the Turkish forces were instructed to hold them against all PVA attacks. This promised to be a difficult task if the PVA were determined to take the outposts, for they were at a considerable distance from the MLR and the PVA's approach routes were easier than those of I Corps.

== Battle ==
On 25 May, after the UN Command had made its final offer at the Panmunjom truce talks, the PVA artillery began to open up on the Nevada Complex. For the next three days the shells came in with growing frequency and PVA troop movements in the area increased. Acar secured artillery support from I Corps and the 1st Marine Division artillery, in addition to that which the 25th Division could provide, to counter the PVA concentrations. From the Marine 1st Tank Battalion, 34 tanks rolled into position to funnel direct fire support to the outposts. When the first attack came on the evening of 28 May, the Turkish units defending the outposts were well dug in and adequately armed. Barbed wire, trip flares, and mines were in place and automatic weapons sited to cover the enemy approach routes. There were 140 men at Vegas, 44 at Carson, 33 at Elko, 27 at Berlin, and 16 at East Berlin.

Following an intense artillery and mortar preparation, the 120th Division sent four battalions forward, two to the east against the main objective, Vegas, one to the south against Carson and Elko, and one in a diversionary attack against Berlin and East Berlin. The diversionary attack was halted and broken off early in the evening. On Vegas the PVA succeeded in taking one small finger of the hill and clung tenaciously despite the heavy automatic weapons, small arms, artillery, and mortar fire at them. The Turks sent a reinforcing platoon in to bolster the defenders and it arrived in time to help throw back a three-pronged PVA assault on the outpost. After reorganizing, the PVA again sent a force estimated at two battalions to take the position. Ammunition began to run low and the Turkish 2nd Battalion commander sent another platoon accompanied by Korean Service Corps personnel to resupply the embattled troops. After a brief respite in the fighting, the PVA tried again and this time they pushed through and hand-to-hand combat broke out in the trenches. Meanwhile, the PVA had added a second battalion to the assault on Carson and Elko and closed upon the Turkish positions. Bayonets and hand grenades were used freely as the Turks managed to repel the attack. The battalion commander sent an engineer platoon, then committed the rest of the engineer company to the defense of Carson. Shortly after midnight the pace slackened, but observers reported that a third PVA battalion was assembling to join in the assault. Fire support from the 1st Battalion of the Turkish force and the US 35th Infantry Regiment helped to disperse this reinforcing PVA battalion. As the night wore on, Elko held out against continuing PVA attacks, but the Turkish soldiers on Carson were being gradually eliminated. A few managed to slip over and join their comrades on Elko, but the majority died in the trenches and bunkers from PVA fire. By morning Carson belonged to the PVA.

Convinced of the PVA determination to take the Nevada Complex, Williams placed the US 1st Battalion, 14th Infantry Regiment under Acar so that he could commit his reserves to the counterattack. However the PVA gradually gained control of the northwest portion of Vegas and Turkish casualties were increasing. In a desperate effort to blunt the PVA drive, the Turks began a counterattack to clear the hill and they slowly swept the PVA off of Vegas. Undaunted, the PVA regrouped and reinforced their offensive units, then came back again. The edged their way up Vegas and met the Turks, who refused to move. Late in the morning of 29 May, the Turks launched a four-platoon attack that cleared Vegas. The PVA in turn would not accept defeat and sent wave after wave of men against the Turkish positions, as casualties on both sides increased sharply. On Elko the battle continued throughout of the night of 28–29 May, as the PVA increased the pressure against the remnants of the Turkish force on the hill. Acar ordered Lieutenant colonel Carl E. Mann, the commander of the 1st Battalion, 14th Infantry, to send one of his companies to reinforce Elko and to retake Carson on the morning of 29 May. Company B approached Elko from the southeast, overran the PVA around the outpost, and secured the objective after a 25-minute fight. Using two platoons in the attack and two in the support roles, Company B then advanced west on Carson. Midway between Elko and Carson, the company began to receive heavy automatic weapons, artillery, and mortar fire, and the assault slowed, then halted. Withdrawing to Elko, Company B tried twice to gather momentum enough to break through the PVA wall of fire on Carson. Each time it failed and had to turn back. UN artillery, mortars and automatic weapons could not silence the PVA weapons nor dislodge the defenders. After the third assault ground to a halt, the PVA retaliated. Six times they crossed from Carson to Elko and on several occasions managed to advance within hand grenade range. Company B, supported by artillery, tank, mortar and automatic weapons fire, forced the PVA to break off the attack each time and Elko remained in UN possession.

== Aftermath ==
By mid-afternoon on 29 May, Williams and I Corps Commander Lieutenant general Bruce C. Clarke evidently felt that the Chinese intended to remain on the offensive until the outposts were taken. UN strength on Vegas was down to approximately 40 men, many of them wounded, and to 20 on Elko. Over 150 men had been killed and 245 had been wounded in the defense of the Nevada Complex. On the other hand, the total casualties of PVA 46th army were at 1,156 men for all battles occurred from 27 May to 23 Jun. The question was should the UN Command hang on to the outposts while the losses on both sides mounted, or should the terrain be evacuated and more UN lives be conserved? Under the circumstances the commanders decided that the outposts had served their main purpose in uncovering and delaying the PVA attack. Early in the evening of 29 May orders went out for the Turks to withdraw from Vegas and for the US troops to leave Elko.

It had been a bitter struggle as the losses on each side attested. Over 117,000 rounds of artillery fire and 67 close air support missions had aided the UN ground units in withstanding the determined assaults of the PVA. The PVA had sent 65,000 rounds of artillery and mortar fire in return, up to this point an unprecedented volume in the Korean War. The tenacity of the PVA attack following the submission of the UNC 25 May proposal at Panmunjom indicated that the PVA were beginning to jockey for improved positions along the front in anticipation of an armistice. Undeterred apparently by the casualties incurred, the Chinese now seemed ready to use personnel and carefully hoarded supplies of ammunition with a free hand as the negotiations entered the final phase.
