= 46th Corps (People's Republic of China) =

46th Corps (1948–60) 46th Army Corps (1960–85)
- Chinese: 陆军第46军
- Active: 1948.11–1985.10
- Country: (China)
- Part of: Jinan Military Region
- Garrison/HQ: Linyi, Shandong
- Engagements: Chinese Civil War, Korean War, Sino-Soviet border conflict

The 46th Army Corps (Chinese: 陆军第46军) was a military formation of China's People's Liberation Army existed from 1948 to 1985.

The 46th Corps (Chinese: 第46军) was activated on November 15, 1948, under the Regulation of the Redesignations of All Organizations and Units of the Army, issued by the Central Military Commission on 1 November 1948, basing on the 9th Column of the Northeastern Field Army.

As of its formation, the Corps was composed of four divisions: the 136th, 137th, 138th and 159th. The corps was deployed in several major battles during the Chinese Civil War, including the Liaoshen Campaign, Pingjin Campaign(namely the Battle of Tianjin), and the Hengbao Campaign.

From 1949 to 1951 it participated in bandit suppression operations in southern Guangxi.

In August 1949, the 159th Division detached from the corps to transfer to Hunan Provincial Military District's control.

From January 1951 to August 1952, the corps was deployed to eastern Guangdong.

In July 1952, 138th detached from the corps to join the 45th Corps; the 133rd Division attached to the corps from the 45th Corps.

From August 1952 to October 1955 the corps was deployed to North Korea as a part of the People's Volunteer Army. The corps HQ was redeployed in Jilin City after it withdrew to China.

On February 4, 1956, Artillery Cadre Regiment, 46th Corps was activated.

In April 1960, the corps was redesignated as the 46th Army Corps (Chinese: 陆军第46军). By then the corps was composed of:

- 133rd Army Division
  - 397th Regiment
  - 398th Regiment
  - 399th Regiment
  - 516th Artillery Regiment
- 136th Army Division
  - 406th Regiment
  - 407th Regiment
  - 408th Regiment
  - 517th Artillery Regiment
- 137th Army Division
  - 409th Regiment
  - 410th Regiment
  - 411th Regiment
  - 518th Artillery Regiment
- 151st Artillery Regiment
- 71st Anti-Aircraft Artillery Regiment

On March 2, 1969, a reconnaissance unit from the 133rd Army Division participated in the first clash in the Zhenbao Island conflict. In August 1969, all number designations were dropped for artillery and anti-aircraft artillery regiments. In December 1969, the 133rd Army Division was redesignated as the 138th Army Division.

In May 1975, the 46th Army Corps exchanged its garrison with the 68th Army Corps. The corps moved to Xuzhou with its three divisions. The 1st and 2nd Garrison Division of Jinan Military Region were put under the corps' control.

In February 1976, the Tank Regiment of 46th Army Corps was activated from the 4th Independent Tank Regiment of Jinan Military Region. By then the corps was composed of:

- 136th Army Division
  - 406th Regiment
  - 407th Regiment
  - 408th Regiment
  - Artillery Regiment
- 137th Army Division
  - 409th Regiment
  - 410th Regiment
  - 411th Regiment
  - Artillery Regiment
- 138th Army Division
  - 412th Regiment
  - 413th Regiment
  - 414th Regiment
  - Artillery Regiment
- 1st Garrison Division of Jinan Military Region
  - 1st Garrison Regiment
  - 2nd Garrison Regiment
  - 3rd Garrison Regiment
- 2nd Garrison Division of Jinan Military Region
  - 4th Garrison Regiment
  - 5th Garrison Regiment
  - 6th Garrison Regiment
- Tank Regiment
- Artillery Regiment
- Anti-Aircraft Artillery Regiment

In 1978, the army corps repositioned to Linyi, Shandong. 1st Garrison Division of Jinan Military Region detached from the corps. 2nd Garrison Division of Jinan Military Region was disbanded.

In December 1982, the 8th Tank Division attached to the corps.

In October 1985, the 46th Army Corps was deactivated:

- The 136th Army Division was reconstituted as the 136th Infantry Division and attached to the 67th Army;
- The 137th Army Division was deactivated and reconstituted as the Artillery Brigade, 26th Army;
- The 138th Army Division was reconstituted as the 138th Infantry Division and attached to the 26th Army;
- The 8th Tank Division joined the 67th Army;
- Tank Regiment, 46th Army Corps was reconstituted as the Tank Regiment, 138th Infantry Division;
- Anti-Aircraft Artillery Regiment, 46th Army Corps was reconstituted as the Anti-Aircraft Artillery Regiment, 138th Infantry Division.
