= 45th Army (People's Republic of China) =

Military formation of the People's Liberation Army, active from 1948

The 45th Army was a military formation of the People's Liberation Army, active from 1948 for a period.

In November 1948, the 8th Column of the Northeastern Field Army in Liaoning, Liaoyang, Haicheng and other regions, was renamed the 45th Army of the Chinese People's Liberation Army. It included the 133rd, 134th, 135th, and 158th Divisions. In March 1949, the 45th Army was assigned to the 12th Army Group of the Fourth Field Army. At this time the 45th Army appears to have come under the command of Huang Yongsheng.

In April 1950, the 158th Division was transferred to the Guangzhou City Public Security Command system. In March 1951, the army moved to Guangdong Province Huaxian, Qingyuan, Foshan area. In July, the 134th Division transferred to Zhanjiang, Haikang and other regions. In August 1952, Feng Zhongnan Military Order, the 133rd Division transferred to the 46th Army. In October, the 134th Division, 45th Army, the 135th Division, and the 130th Division, 44th Army, was reorganised as the 54th Army, owned by the Central Military Region. This reorganisation apparently took place in Guangdong. The 54th Army was then deployed to Korea.

Later the 134th Division became the 161 Division in 1969, and was revoked in 1985.
