= 174th Brigade =

174th Brigade may refer to:

== United Kingdom ==
- 174th (2/2nd London) Brigade
- 174th (Deptford) Brigade, Royal Field Artillery

== United States ==
- 174th Air Defense Artillery Brigade, a major subordinate command of the Ohio Army National Guard located in Columbus, Ohio
- 174th Infantry Brigade (United States), a U.S. Army Reserve training brigade located at Fort Drum, New York

== See also ==
- 174th Regiment (disambiguation)
