= Fourth Field Army =

Unit of the People's Liberation Army, 1949–1955

- Active: 1949-1955
- Country: China
- Allegiance: Chinese Communist Party
- Branch: People's Liberation Army Ground Force
- Role: Field army
- Size: 1.5 million
- Part of: People's Liberation Army
- Colors: Grey
- Engagements: Second Sino-Japanese War; Chinese Civil War

Commanders
- Notable commanders: Lin Biao; Luo Ronghuan

The Chinese People's Liberation Army Fourth Field Army (Chinese: 中国人民解放军第四野战军) was an army group-level military formation of the People's Liberation Army. It was formed during the Chinese Civil War by existing members of Eighth Route Army and New Fourth Army stationed in Manchuria along with others, where they fought against the Republic of China government. The army also incorporated elements of the former Manchurian occupation forces, which included around 30 thousand Japanese technicians. The army was commanded by Lin Biao, and it was involved in many crucial battles including the Liaoshen Campaign.

After the surrender of Japan in 1945, the Northeast People's Autonomous Army (Chinese: 東北人民自衛軍) was established from the Eighth Route Army that mobilized into Northeast China and local anti-Japanese guerillas. On January 14, 1946, it was renamed the Northeast Democratic United Forces (Chinese: 東北民主聯軍), It became the Northeast People's Liberation Army(Chinese: 東北人民解放軍) and later the Northeast Field Army (Chinese: 東北野戰軍) in 1948.

The 156th Division was created in November 1948 under the Regulation of the Redesignations of All Organizations and Units of the Army, issued by Central Military Commission on November 1, 1948, based on the 6th Independent Division, Northeastern Field Army, PLA.

After the fall of Tianjin to Communist forces on 14–15 January 1949, the Nationalist garrison in Beiping was effectively isolated. Fu Zuoyi came to the decision to negotiate a peace settlement on 21 January. In the following week, 260,000 Nationalist troops began to exit the city in anticipation of the immediate surrender. On 31 January 1949, the Fourth Field Army entered Beiping to take over the city which marked the conclusion of the Pingjin Campaign.

On March 11, 1949, the Northeastern Field Army was renamed the PLA's Fourth Field Army. The army comprised the 12th, 13th, 14th, 15th Army, special technical troops, the Column of Guangdong and Guangxi, and the 50th and 51st Corps. William W. Whitson, writing with Chen-Hsia Huang in The Chinese High Command, 1972, lists several armies under the Fourth Field Army in the June–September 1949 period. He writes that the 12th Army comprised the 41st, 42nd, 45th, and 46th Corps, the 13th Army comprised the 38th, 39th, and 49th Corps, and gives the 14th Army as comprising the 48th Corps (142nd, 143rd, and 144th Divisions) and the 54th Corps (160th, 161st, and 162nd Divisions). He lists a commander for the 14th Army, but this differs from seemingly unanimous current consensus that the 14th Army's commander at the time was Liu Yalou. Also part of the Fourth Field Army at the time was the 15th Army, with several subordinate corps. Separate corps may have included the 50th, 51st, 54th, 56th, and 58th.

In July–August 1949, the Fourth Field Army dispatched two Korean-Chinese divisions, the 164th and 166th, into Korea to become part of the initial forces of the Korean People's Army. A third division, the 156th, was reorganised with other smaller units and individual Korean personnel from the other three field armies into the 15th Independent Division, and was transferred to the KPA in April 1950. The 156th and 166th Divisions became the KPA's 7th and 6th Divisions respectively.

On 25 October 1949, Liu Yalou was appointed as the chief of air force in the People's Liberation Army. By 11 November, the air force command was officially formed from the headquarters of the 14th bingtuan ("Army").

Also in October, after the Changsha uprising, the Kuomintang Army 1st Corps may have become the 21st Army (52nd, 53rd Corps).

The Fourth Field Army fought in the Bobai Campaign (November–December 1949), and on May 1, 1950, elements, including the 45th Corps, completed the Landing Operation on Hainan Island.

The Fourth Field Army was disbanded in April 1955, after association with the Central Military Region for a period, to form part of the new Guangzhou Military Region.

== Order of battle ==
- Fourth Field Army – Marshal Lin Biao
  - 12th Army – Senior General Xiao Jinguang
    - 40th Corps – General Luo Shunchu
    - 45th Corps – General Huang Yongsheng
    - 46th Corps – Lieutenant General Zhan Caifang
  - 13th Army – General Cheng Zihua
    - 38th Corps – General Li Tianyou
    - 47th Corps – Lieutenant General Liang Xingchu
    - 49th Corps – Major General Zhong Wei
  - 14th Army – General Liu Yalou
    - 39th Corps – General Liu Zhen
    - 41st Corps – Lieutenant General Wu Kehua
    - 42nd Corps – Lieutenant General Wan Yi
  - 15th Army – General Deng Hua
    - 43rd Corps – Lieutenant General Li Zuopeng
    - 44th Corps – Lieutenant General Fang Qiang
    - 48th Corps – Major General He Jinnian
  - 21st Army – General Chen Mingren
    - 52nd Corps – Lieutenant General Wang Jinxiu
    - 53rd Corps – Major General Peng Jieru
  - 50th Corps - Lieutenant General Zeng Zesheng
  - 51st Corps - Lieutenant General Zhang Zhen
  - 54th Corps - Major General Ding Sheng
  - 58th Corps - Lieutenant General Kong Qingde
