= Womack =

Womack may refer to:

- Womack (surname), people with the surname Womack
- Womack, Missouri, a US unincorporated community
- Womack Army Medical Center at Fort Bragg (North Carolina)
- Womack & Womack, singing and songwriting partnership
- Womack Development Company, a home construction company acquired by Lennar in 1973
- Womack Water, a small lake near Ludham in the Norfolk Broads
  - Womack Water Windpump, a drainage mill in Ludham
