= 14th Infantry Regiment (United States) =

- Coat of arms approved 10 Dec 1921
- Active: 1861–present
- Country: United States
- Branch: United States Army
- Type: Infantry
- Nickname: "Golden Dragons" (special designation)
- Motto: Right of the Line
- Engagements: American Civil War; Peninsula; Manassas; Antietam; Fredericksburg; Chancellorsville; Gettysburg; The Wilderness; Spotsylvania; Cold Harbor; Petersburg; Indian Wars; Spanish–American War; Boxer Rebellion; Philippine–American War; Pancho Villa Expedition; World War II; Korean War; Vietnam War; Somalia; Afghanistan Campaign; Iraq Campaign

Commanders
- Notable commanders: Paul Octave Hebert; John F. Reynolds; Charles Pomeroy Stone; Henry Delp Styer

Insignia
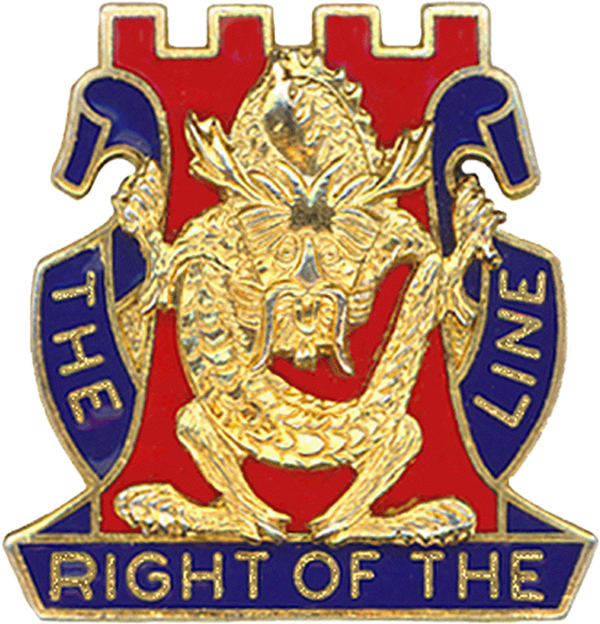
- Distinctive unit insignia approved 6 Nov 1924

The 14th Infantry Regiment ("Golden Dragons") is a United States Army light infantry regiment. It has served in the American Civil War, Boxer Rebellion, World War II, Korean War, Vietnam War, Operation Restore Hope, Operation Uphold Democracy, Operation Joint Guard, Operation Desert Storm, Operation Enduring Freedom, Operation Gothic Serpent, Operation New Dawn, Operation Resolute Support, Operation Iraqi Freedom, Operation Inherent Resolve, and Operation Freedom Sentinel. The 14th Infantry Regiment did not take part in combat during World War I. It has also conducted peacekeeping and humanitarian missions in the Sinai Peninsula, Guantánamo Bay in Cuba, Bosnia, and Kosovo.

Only the 2nd Battalion of the 14th Infantry Regiment is currently active, assigned to 2nd Brigade, 10th Mountain Division at Fort Drum, New York.

== History ==
=== Civil War, 1861–66 ===
In May 1861, President Abraham Lincoln called for the creation of nine additional Regular Army infantry regiments in preparation for the looming civil war. These regiments were designated the 11th through the 19th Infantry and organized as "three-battalion" regiments, each battalion containing eight companies of infantry, in contrast to the original ten regular regiments of infantry, which were organized on the traditional ten-company line.

The 14th Infantry Regiment was organized on 3 May 1861 at Fort Trumbull, Connecticut, in two battalions with the third added in April 1862. Part of the Army of the Potomac, the regiment saw its first combat action in the Peninsula Campaign 17 May 1862. The regiment was assigned to 1st Brigade, 2nd Division, 5th Corps, Army of the Potomac and fought at Antietam, Chancellorsville, Gettysburg, The Wilderness and Petersburg.

In recognition of the regiment's heroic performance of duty during twelve of the bloodiest campaigns of the American Civil War, General George Meade, awarded the 14th Infantry Regiment the place of honor at the "Right of the Line" in the Grand Review of the Armies in Washington, DC at the end of the war. This is where the regiment takes its motto "The Right of the Line".

Following the Civil War, the Army was reorganized by Congress in July 1866, and the 14th was divided into three regiments, each battalion receiving two additional companies and being organized along traditional lines. The 1st Battalion retained the designation of the 14th Infantry, while the 2nd Battalion became the 23rd Infantry and the 3rd Battalion the 32nd Infantry.

=== Indian Wars, 1866–78 ===
The regiment was sent to the Presidio of San Francisco following the Civil War and from there line companies were posted to locations in Arizona, California, Oregon, and Washington. The regiment took part in two Indian campaigns and detachments were in two other campaigns (including the 1866-1868 Snake War) but not in sufficient strength to entitle the regiment as a whole to participation credit.

Campaign participation credit during this time includes Arizona 1866; Wyoming 1874; Little Big Horn 1876; Bannocks 1878.

==== Arizona, 1866–1869 ====
Five companies from the regiment (Companies B, C, D, F, and G) fought the Apaches in 1866 in Arizona. After three years of service in deserts of the Southwest, the regiment was sent to the South for Reconstruction duty beginning in July 1869.

==== Wyoming, 1870–1874 ====
The threat of an Indian war in the Dakotas caused the regiment to be moved back to the frontier in April 1870, first to Fort Randall, then to Fort Sedgwick, and finally to Fort Laramie in March 1871. In 1874, three companies from the regiment (Companies D, F, and G) operated against Indian tribes raiding ranches and mines in the Wyoming territory. On February 9, 1874, a soldier from the regiment, 1st Lt. Levi H. Robinson, was killed during a skirmish with Indians north of Fort Laramie. He is the namesake of Fort Robinson in Nebraska.

==== Great Sioux War, 1876–1877 ====
A total of six companies from the regiment participated in the Great Sioux War.

Soon after the Battle of the Little Bighorn in June 1876, four companies from the regiment (Companies B, C, F, and I) participated in a punitive expedition. They departed Fort Douglas, Utah, by train, arrived at Medicine Bow, Wyoming, on June 25, and then marched overland to join General Crook’s column at Goose Creek. This expedition is noteworthy as it included the infamous Horsemeat March, one of the most grueling marches in American military history, and the Battle of Slim Buttes.

In November 1876, two companies from the regiment (Companies D and G) left Fort Fetterman accompanying eleven cavalry companies commanded by Colonel Ranald S. Mackenzie. The expedition proceeded northward along the Bozeman Trail and attacked a Cheyenne village on November 25, 1876, in what became known as the Dull Knife Fight.

==== Death of Crazy Horse, 1877 ====
Captain James Kennington, who had led Company B during the Battle of Slim Buttes, was the Officer of the Day at Fort Robinson and escorted Crazy Horse to the guardhouse when the captured Lakota war leader was killed on September 5, 1877. Private William Gentles, Company F, 14th Infantry, bayoneted Crazy Horse during the attempted escape.

==== Bannock War, 1878 ====
The Bannock War was an armed conflict between the U.S. military and Bannock and Paiute warriors in Idaho and Northeastern Oregon from June to August 1878.

=== Fort Vancouver, 1884–1898 ===
The regiment was posted to Fort Vancouver, Washington, and was one of the units with the longest association to the site during this era. Members of regiment were deployed to Seattle in response to anti-Chinese riots in 1885-1886.

=== Spanish–American War, 1898 ===
The regiment was at the capture of Manila on August 13, 1898, in the Spanish–American War, and in the fighting around the same city in 1899.

=== China Relief Expedition, 1900 ===
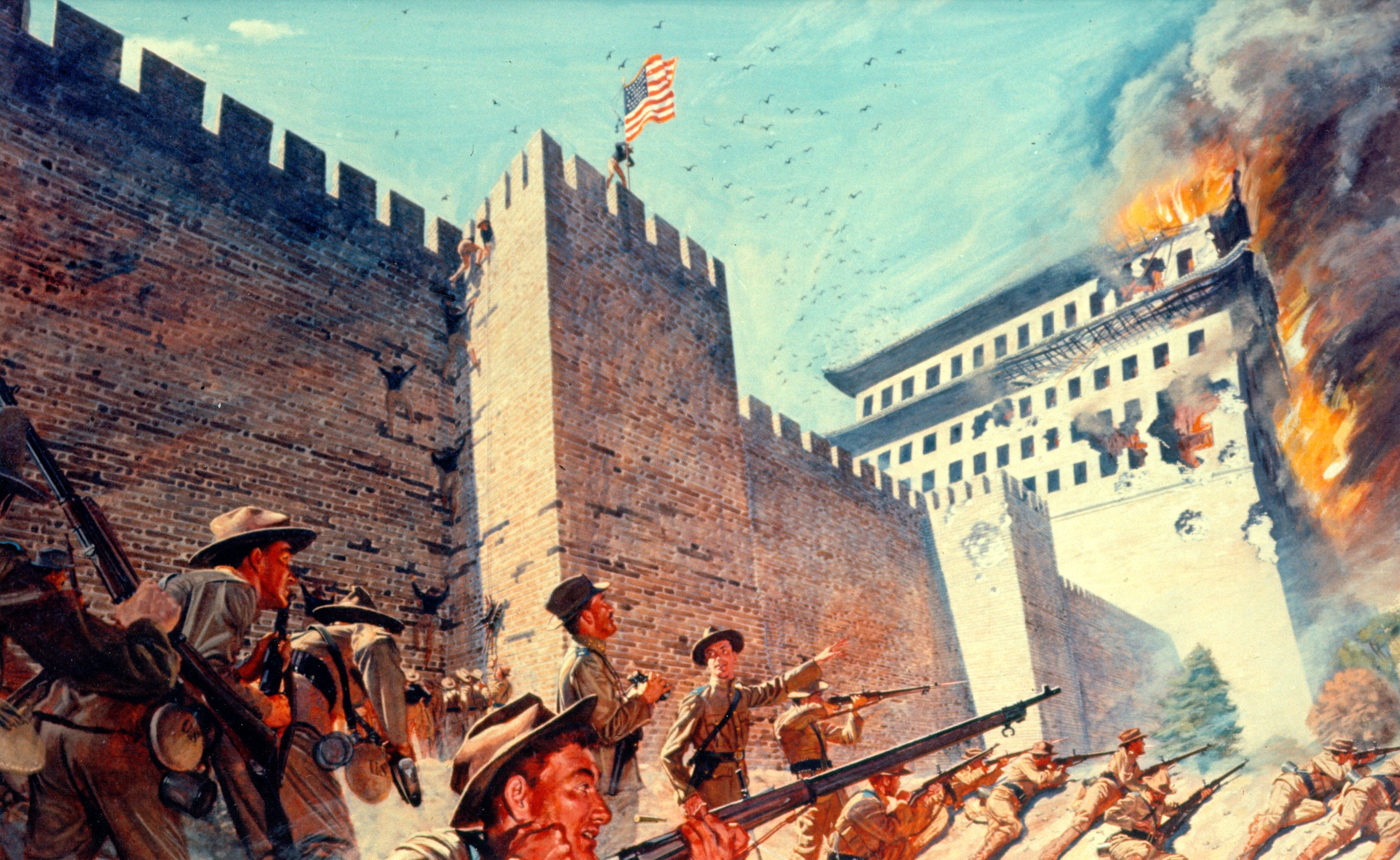
Corporal Titus scaling the walls of Peking.

During the early years of the 20th century, the 14th Infantry Regiment was deployed to China to help put down the Boxer Rebellion. The 14th was the spearhead in winning a victory over the Chinese army at the Battle of Yangcun. At the Tung Pien Gate in Peking, the regiment was taking heavy fire and was unable to effectively engage the enemy. To counteract, volunteers were called for to scale the wall and lay down suppressive fire from the better vantage point while the rest of the regiment followed. Corporal Calvin P. Titus, a band member and chaplains assistant from E Company, volunteered, and with rope slung over his shoulder scaled the wall and laid down the suppressive fire that allowed more and more soldiers behind him to follow.

For his actions, he was awarded the Medal of Honor as well as receiving an appointment to West Point. For their conduct of the operation, the 14th Infantry Regiment was rewarded by the Chinese government a large amount of silver bullion which was later fashioned into an ornamented punchbowl with matching cups and other dinnerware that is still kept in 2nd Battalion, 14th Infantry Regiment headquarters.

=== World War I, 1917–18 ===
On the eve of the US entry into World War I, the 14th Infantry Regiment was stationed in Yuma, Arizona, although the 1st Battalion was on detached duty in Alaska. The regiment was subsequently transferred to Vancouver Barracks, Washington. In 1918 the 14th was moved to Butte, Montana, to guard the Anaconda copper mines. Although a Regular Army unit, the regiment did not see active service during the war.

Omar Bradley, who was later to serve with distinction in World War II and a future chief of staff of the United States Army, served with this regiment during the early years of his military career.

=== Interwar Period, 1919–1941 ===
The 14th Infantry Regiment was stationed at Camp Custer, Michigan, in 1919. On 22 October 1920, it was transferred to Fort Davis, in the Panama Canal Zone, and was assigned to the Panama Canal Division on 3 July 1921. When the Panama Canal Division was inactivated in 1932, the regiment was attached to Headquarters, Atlantic Sector on 15 April 1932. On 10 April 1940, the regiment was assigned to the Panama Canal Division's successor, the Panama Mobile Force.

=== World War II, 1941–45 ===
In 1943, the Golden Dragons were ordered to Camp Carson, Colorado. The regiment arrived in San Francisco, California on 18 June 1943 and was assigned to the 71st Light Division on 10 July 1943. The 14th, along with the rest of the 71st Division underwent unit combat training at Camp Carson then at Camp Roberts, California and at Fort Benning Georgia. At Fort Benning the 71st was reorganized and redesignated as the 71st Infantry Division.

On 25 January 1945, the Golden Dragons sailed from New York with the rest of the 71st Division, arriving in Le Havre on 7 February 1945. The 14th then moved some 350 miles (560 km) across France. At Ratzwiller the 71st Division relieved the 100th Division. On 21 March 1945 the 14th took part in the 71st Division's breaching the Siegfried Line and the capture of Pirmasens. On 30 March 1945 the 71st crossed the Rhine River and went into reserve near Frankfurt.

The 14th Infantry then participated along with its sister regiment the 5th Infantry in the elimination of bypassed German forces north of Hanau, Germany on 2 April 1945. On 13 April 1945 the Golden Dragons cut the main Berlin to Munich autobahn. On 14–16 April 1945 the 14th participated in its heaviest combat as the 71st Division seized the town of Bayreuth, Germany. Bypassing German strongpoints the 71st Division sped south with the 14th Infantry crossing the Danube River and participating in the seizure of the city of Regensburg on 27 April 1945. From there the 14th made an assault crossing of the Isar River under fire and entered Austria on 2 May 1945. The 71st Division linked up with advancing Soviet Army units east of Linz, Austria on 8 May 1945 and hostilities ceased on 9 May 1945.

=== Korean War, 1950–53 ===
In responding to the North Korean invasion of South Korea in June 1950 the U.S. Army found itself desperately short of units to halt the Communist advance. Continental U.S. (CONUS) units were stripped of personnel and equipment and sent to Korea on a priority basis. On 21 July 1950 the 3rd Battalion, 14th Infantry was reassigned to the Far East Command and then to the 1st Cavalry Division where it was redesignated as the 3rd Battalion, 5th Cavalry Regiment. Unlike other units that had been cobbled together at the last minute, the 3rd Battalion, 14th Infantry was at full strength and due to its rigorous training in mountain warfare was in excellent shape to fight in the Korean mountains.

On 23 July 1950, the 1st Battalion, 14th Infantry was transferred to Fort Benning where it was assigned to and redesignated as a battalion in one of the 3rd Infantry Division's regiments. The 3rd Division was initially sent to Japan then to Korea. The remaining personnel and equipment of the 14th Infantry at Camp Carson were reassigned to other CONUS units. On 1 August 1951 the 14th Infantry less personnel and equipment was assigned to the 25th Infantry Division then fighting in Korea. To man and equip the 14th Infantry the assets of the 34th Infantry Regiment of the 24th Division, then conducting infantry training in Japan, were used. The 14th Infantry moved to Korea where it replaced the 24th Infantry Regiment, which was being inactivated due to the 24th's division commander, Gen. William B. Kean, request that it be disbanded because it was "untrustworthy and incapable of carrying out missions expected of an infantry regiment."

The next two years found the regiment in almost constant combat along the 38th parallel defending places like "The Punchbowl" and "Porkchop Hill". The 25th Infantry Division assumed the responsibility of guarding the approaches to Seoul on 5 May 1953. 23 days later, when ceasefire negotiations at Panmunjom stalled, a heavy PVA assault hit the Nevada Complex, the Division held its ground; the brunt of the attack was absorbed by the attached Turkish Brigade and the 14th Infantry. The 14th Infantry's service in Korea earned the regiment five campaign streamers and a Republic of Korea Presidential Unit Citation for gallantry at Munsan-Ni. Three soldiers were awarded the Medal of Honor for their actions in Korea; Sergeant Donn F. Porter, Private First Class Ernest E. West, and Private First Class Bryant H. Womack.

=== Vietnam, 1965–72 ===
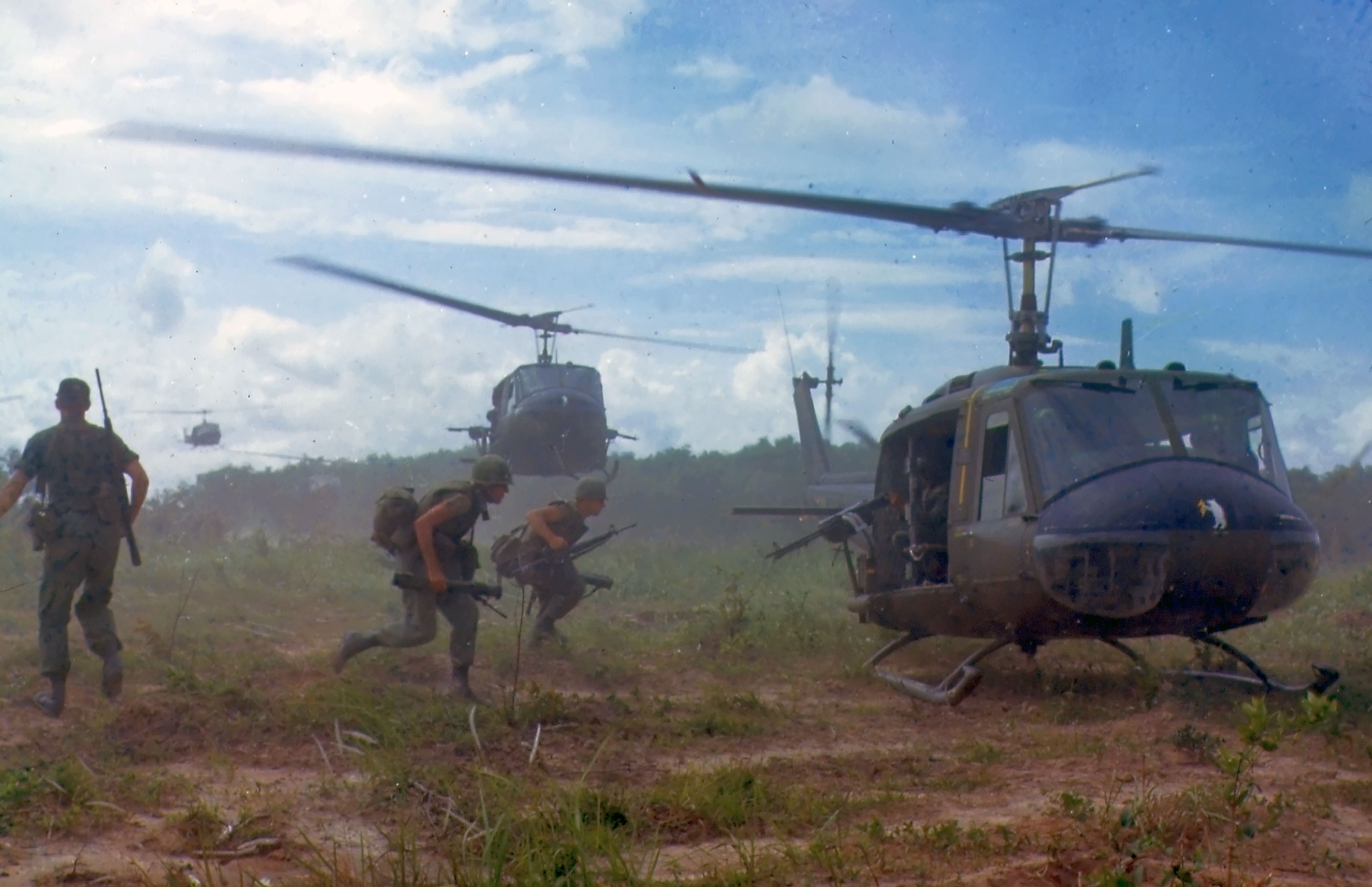
UH-1D helicopters airlift members of the 2nd Battalion, 14th Infantry Regiment from the Filhol Rubber Plantation area to a new staging area, during Operation Wahiawa, a search and destroy mission conducted by the 25th Infantry Division, northeast of Cu Chi, 1966

1st Battalion, 14th Infantry: In late 1965 the 25th Division was ordered to South Vietnam. The initial brigade to go was the 3rd Brigade composed of the 1st Battalion, 14th Infantry, the 1st Battalion, 35th Infantry, the 2nd Battalion, 35th Infantry and the 2nd Battalion, 9th Artillery. The urgency of getting the 3rd Brigade to the Central Highlands of South Vietnam led to the Army and Air Force undertaking Operation Blue Light, a massive airlift of the entire 3rd Brigade from Hawaii to Pleiku. The airlift began on 28 December 1965 and was successfully concluded on 17 January 1966.

Commanded by LTC Gilbert Procter Jr., the 1/14th spent most of 1966 operating along the Cambodian border as part of the 3rd Brigade's mission of preventing the People's Army of Vietnam (PAVN) from cutting South Vietnam in half. In November 1966, elements of the 1st Battalion engaged two PAVN battalions inflicting heavy losses on the enemy. Among the numerous Golden Dragons performing heroically during these engagements, two members of the 1st Battalion - 1st Lt. Joseph Grant and Sgt. Ted Belcher were posthumously awarded the Medal of Honor.

The 1st Battalion was reassigned to the 4th Infantry Division on 1 August 1967 as part of the exchange of 3rd Brigades between the 25th and 4th Infantry Divisions. The 1st Battalion participated in a total of 12 Vietnam campaigns, receiving the Navy Presidential Unit Citation for gallantry in action at Chu Lai. Company A received the Valorous Unit Award for action in Quang Ngai Province. In addition the 1st Battalion received four awards of the Vietnamese Gallantry Cross with Palm and one award of the Vietnam Civil Action Medal, First Class.

On 8 December 1970 the 1st Battalion was reduced to zero strength at An Khe, Vietnam with the exception of a battalion color guard which returned the battalion colors to Schofield Barracks. On 15 December 1970 the 1st Battalion was reassigned to the 25th Division and the 3rd Battalion, 14th Infantry was inactivated with its personnel and equipment reassigned to the 1st Battalion.

2nd Battalion, 14th Infantry: The 1st Brigade of the 25th Division to which the 2nd Battalion, 14th Infantry was assigned was scheduled to be the last of the three maneuver brigades to deploy to South Vietnam. The brigade was shy two of its three infantry battalions. When the 25th was reorganized from battle groups to battalions in 1963 two of the nine authorized infantry battalions were not activated as a cost-saving measure. Initially the plan was to activate and train two new battalions for the 1st Brigade but the timetable was too short. Adding to the problem was the need to heavily levy the 2nd Battalion for fillers for infantry battalions of the 3rd Brigade, which left in December 1965 and of the 2nd Brigade, which departed Schofield in January 1966. To round out the 1st Brigade two battalions assigned to Alaska—the 4th Battalion, 9th Infantry and the 4th Battalion, 23rd Infantry—were reassigned to the 1st Brigade on 14 January 1966.

By February 1966 the 2nd Battalion began receiving large numbers of replacements, most directly out of Advanced Individual Training. This resulted in an accelerated unit training program to ready the battalion for deployment. To enhance developing unit cohesiveness and to create espirit-de-corps the 2nd Battalion took the informal nickname of Battle Dragons. A "Battle Dragon Chant" was also written and used in battalion formations.

In early April, the 1st Brigade was alerted for movement to South Vietnam. On 16 April 1966 the USNS General Nelson M. Walker sailed from Pearl Harbor with the entire 1st Brigade aboard. The ship arrived at Vung Tau on 28 April. The 2nd Battalion left the ship on 30 April and was moved by truck and aircraft to Củ Chi.

In its over four years of combat in Vietnam, the 2nd Battalion received participation credit for 12 of the campaigns of the Vietnam War. The battalion received two awards of the Vietnamese Gallantry Cross with Palm and one award of the Vietnam Civic Action Medal First Class. On 8 December 1970 the 2nd Battalion left South Vietnam and returned to Schofield Barracks. The battalion was inactivated on 5 June 1972.

3rd Battalion, 14th Infantry: To provide for a Pacific area strategic reserve for contingencies other than the ongoing Vietnam War, the Army activated the 4th Brigade, 25th Infantry Division at Schofield Barracks on 6 December 1969. The 3rd Battalion, 14th Infantry was activated as one of the 4th Brigade's three infantry battalions.

The 3rd Battalion (descending from Company C) was initially activated under CARS as the 3rd Battle Group, 14th Infantry on 1 June 1959 and assigned to the 102nd Infantry Division, U.S. Army Reserve at Kansas City, Missouri. The 3rd Battle Group was reorganized and redesignated as the 3rd Battalion, 14th Infantry on 1 April 1963. On 31 December 1965 the 3rd Battalion was inactivated. It was allotted back to the Regular Army on 6 December 1969 and activated at Schofield Barracks, Hawaii as a component of the 4th Brigade, 25th Division.

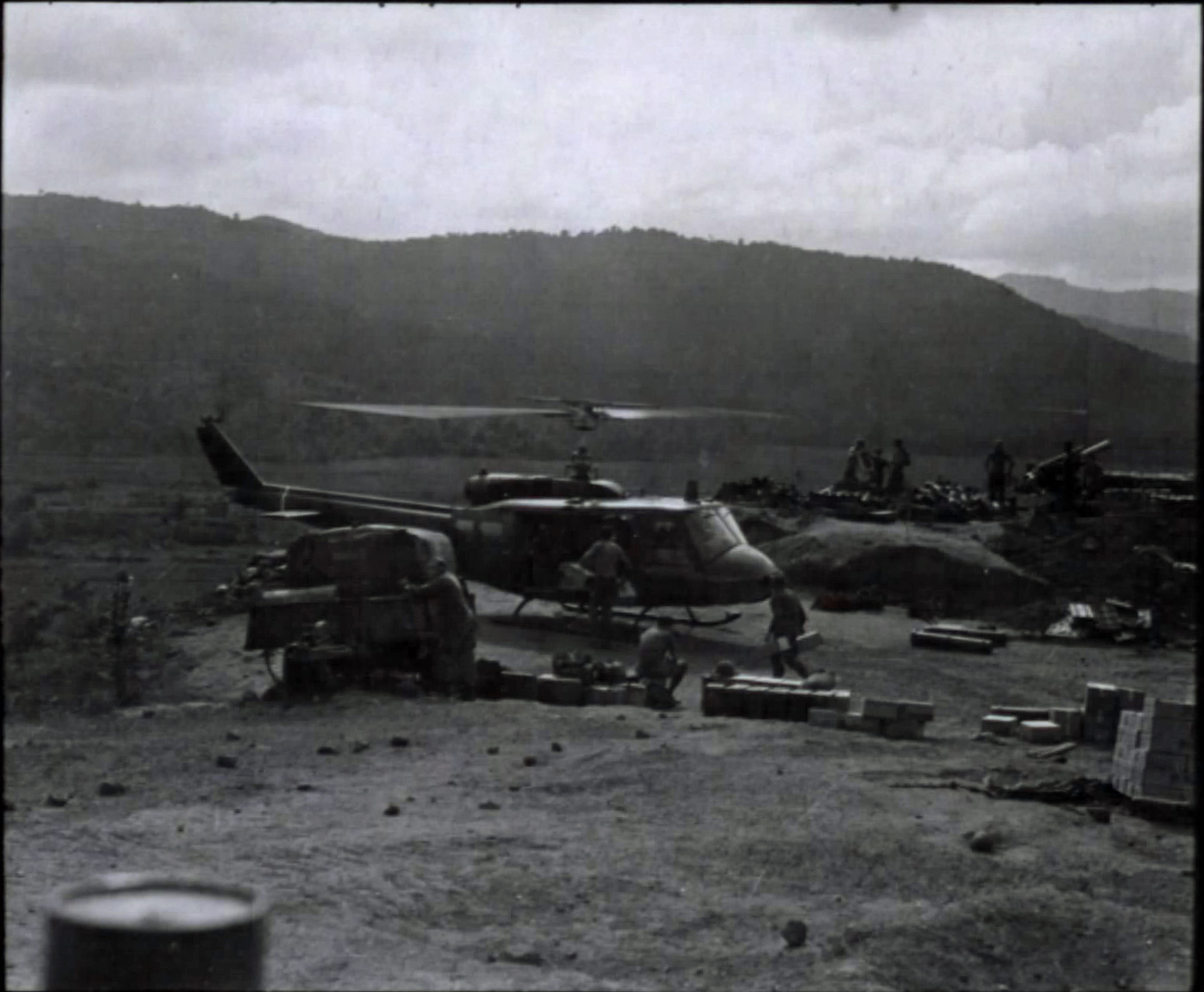
Company E at Firebase Abby

As the 25th Division returned to Schofield Barracks from South Vietnam to resume its traditional mission of being the strategic reserve for the Pacific area the 4th Brigade along with the 3rd Battalion 14th Infantry was inactivated on 15 December 1970. The personnel and equipment of the 3rd Battalion was used to re-man and re-equip the 1st Battalion, 14th Infantry.

Company E served in South Vietnam from 30 June 1971 to 20 November 1972 as a separate rifle security company assigned to the U.S. Army Support Command with the mission of guarding the Long Bình support facility. Company E received campaign participation credit for the last four campaigns of the Vietnam War. In 1986 it was assigned to the 25th Division as Headquarters Company, 5th Battalion. (See below.)

=== Post Vietnam / Cold War ===
As part of the overall post-Vietnam draw-down of the Army only the 1st Brigade, 25th Infantry Division remained active. The 1st Battalion 14th Infantry was assigned to the 1st Brigade and the 2nd Battalion, 14th Infantry was inactivated but remained assigned to the Tropic Lightning at Schofield Barracks, Hawaii.

The 2nd Battalion, 14th Infantry was Relieved 17 January 1986 from assignment to the 25th Infantry Division, assigned to the 10th Mountain Division and activated at Fort Benning, Georgia on 19 December 1985, as the first Light Infantry COHORT Battalion in the 10th Mountain Division. On 25 December 1988, the 2nd Battalion, 14th Infantry Regiment was moved to Fort Drum, New York.

The 3rd Battalion, 14th Infantry was Relieved 2 March 1986 from assignment to the 25th Infantry Division, and assigned to the 10th Mountain Division, and activated at Fort Benning, Georgia. It was later inactivated 15 April 1996 at Fort Drum, New York, and relieved from assignment to the 10th Mountain Division

=== Somalia, 1993 ===
On 3 October 1993, 2-14 Infantry was part of the quick reaction force which helped rescue members of Special Operations Task Force Ranger which had conducted a daylight raid on an enemy stronghold. 2-14 Infantry fought a moving battle for three hours from the gates of the Soccer Stadium Mogadishu to the Rangers' perimeter. They successfully linked up with the Rangers and then began to withdraw under fire. During the 12-hour ordeal, twenty-nine soldiers from 2nd Battalion were wounded and two were killed (PFC James H. Martin, Jr., and SGT Cornell L. Houston, Sr.). 2-14 Infantry along with TF Ranger endured the Mogadishu Mile before returning to the stadium.

=== Haiti, 1994 ===
Operation Uphold Democracy (19 September 1994 – 31 March 1995) was an intervention designed to remove the military regime installed by the 1991 Haitian coup d'état that overthrew the elected president Jean-Bertrand Aristide. The operation was effectively authorized by the 31 July 1994 United Nations Security Council Resolution 940. Teams were deployed throughout the country to establish order and humanitarian services. Regular Army forces consisting of units from the 10th Mountain Division occupied Port-au-Prince (3-14) with 3rd Bn (Airborne) 73rd Armor Regiment (82nd Airborne Division) and elements from the U.S. Army Materiel Command provided logistical support in the form of the Joint Logistics Support Command (JLSC) which provided oversight and direct control over all Multinational Force and U.S. deployed logistics units

=== Bosnia, 1997 ===
On 19 March 1997, two companies of 2-14 Infantry deployed to Bosnia as part of the Stabilisation Force in Bosnia and Herzegovina. Bravo Company's mission was to defend a critical bridge site over the Sava River, while Charlie Company was to act as the theater reserve.

=== Kosovo, 2001 ===
In November, 2001, 2-14 Infantry deployed to Kosovo as part of Task Force Falcon, Operation Joint Guardian.

=== Bosnia, 2002 ===
On 28 March 2002, two companies of 1-14 Infantry deployed to Bosnia.

=== Iraq, 2003–2011 ===
In March 2003, 2nd Battalion, 14th Infantry Regiment, deployed from Fort Drum in preparation for the invasion of Iraq. As part of Task Force Viking, the battalion was attached to 10th Special Forces Group in support of Operation Iraqi Freedom. The battalion linked-up with 10th Special Forces in Constanta, Romania, then deployed to Irbil, Mosul, and Kirkuk. This task force, fighting with Kurdish rebels, defeated six Iraqi divisions. The battalion re-deployed to Fort Drum, New York, six months later.

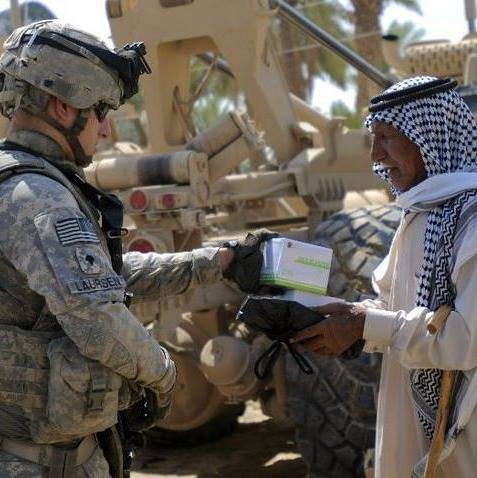
A 2-14 Soldier providing medical supplies to Iraqi citizen, during Operation "Outreach," a humanitarian aid mission near Baghdad, Iraq, 2010

In mid-2004, Soldiers of 2nd Brigade (to include 2nd Battalion, 14th Infantry Regiment) deployed to Iraq for the second time. In Iraq, the brigade executed combat operations in northwest Baghdad attached to the 1st Cavalry Division and detached forces to support other brigades across the city, including a brigade fighting insurgents in Sadr City. In northwest Baghdad, the Commandos secured several key roads and neighborhoods. In addition, the brigade enabled newly established Iraqi Security Forces to secure polling centers during Iraq's elections in January 2005, the first free election held in the country since the 1950s.

The brigade (which includes 2nd Battalion, 14th Infantry Regiment) returned to Iraq for a third time in late 2006, this time to the area southwest of Baghdad known as the “Triangle of Death.” There the brigade battled insurgents and international terrorists alongside its Iraqi Security Force comrades in the area's canals, along the banks of the Euphrates River, and through the cities of Mahmudiyah, Yusafiyah, and Lutafiyah.

It was during this deployment that Staff Sergeant Travis Atkins earned the Medal of Honor after engaging a terrorist in hand-to-hand combat. After engaging the enemy combatant in hand-to-hand combat, Staff Sergeant Atkins realized that the terrorist was attempting to detonate an explosive vest. Staff Sergeant Atkins then selflessly slammed the insurgent to the ground and covered the insurgent with his own body to shield the men under him from the impending blast.

== Lineage and honors ==
=== 14th Infantry Regiment ===
- Constituted 3 May 1861 in the Regular Army as the 2d Battalion, 14th Infantry
- Organized 1 July 1861 at Fort Trumbull, Connecticut
- Reorganized and redesignated 30 April 1862 as the 1st Battalion, 14th Infantry
- Reorganized and redesignated 21 September 1866 as the 14th Infantry
- Consolidated 26 July 1869 with the 45th Infantry, Veteran Reserve Corps (constituted 21 September 1866), and consolidated unit designated as the 14th Infantry
- Assigned 27 July 1918 to the 19th Division
- Relieved 14 February 1919 from assignment to the 19th Division
- Assigned 10 July 1943 to the 71st Light Division (later redesignated as the 71st Infantry Division)
- Relieved 1 May 1946 from assignment to the 71st Infantry Division
- Inactivated 1 September 1946 in Germany
- Activated 1 October 1948 at Camp Carson, Colorado
- Assigned 1 August 1951 to the 25th Infantry Division
- Relieved 1 February 1957 from assignment to the 25th Infantry Division and reorganized as a parent regiment under the Combat Arms Regimental System
- Withdrawn 1 March 1986 from the Combat Arms Regimental System and reorganized under the United States Army Regimental System

Campaign participation credit

Civil War
- Peninsula
- Manassas
- Antietam
- Fredericksburg
- Chancellorsville
- Gettysburg
- Wilderness
- Spotsylvania
- Cold Harbor
- Petersburg
- Virginia 1862
- Virginia 1863

Indian Wars

- Little Big Horn
- Bannocks
- Arizona 1866
- Wyoming 1874

Spanish–American War

- Manila

China Relief Expedition

- Yang-tsun
- Peking

Philippine–American War

- Manila
- Laguna de Bay
- Zapote River
- Cavite
- Luzon 1899

World War II

- Rhineland
- Central Europe

Korean War

- UN Summer-Fall Offensive
- Second Korean Winter
- Korea, Summer-Fall 1952
- Third Korean Winter
- Korea, Summer 1953

Vietnam

- Counteroffensive
- Counteroffensive, Phase II
- Counteroffensive, Phase III
- Tet Counteroffensive
- Counteroffensive, Phase IV
- Counteroffensive, Phase V
- Counteroffensive, Phase VI
- Tet 69/Counteroffensive
- Summer-Fall 1969
- Winter-Spring 1970
- Sanctuary Counteroffensive
- Counteroffensive, Phase VII
- Consolidation I
- Consolidation II
- Cease-Fire

Decorations

- Presidential Unit Citation (Navy), Streamer embroidered CHU LAI
- Valorous Unit Award, Streamer embroidered MOGADISHU
- Republic of Korea Presidential Unit Citation, Streamer embroidered MUNSAN-NI

=== 1st Battalion ===
Constituted 3 May 1861 in the Regular Army as Company A, 2d Battalion, 14th Infantry

Organized 8 July 1861 at Fort Trumbull, Connecticut

Reorganized and redesignated 30 April 1862 as Company A, 1st Battalion, 14th Infantry

Reorganized and redesignated 21 September 1866 as Company A, 14th Infantry

Consolidated 26 July 1869 with Company G, 45th Infantry, Veteran Reserve Corps (constituted 21 September 1866), and consolidated unit designated as Company A, 14th Infantry (14th Infantry assigned 27 July 1918 to the 19th Division; relieved 14 February 1919 from assignment to the 19th Division; assigned 10 July 1943 to the 71st Light Division [later redesignated as the 71st Infantry Division]; relieved 1 May 1946 from assignment to the 71st Infantry Division)

Inactivated 1 September 1946 in Germany

Activated 1 October 1948 at Camp Carson, Colorado (14th Infantry assigned 1 August 1951 to the 25th Infantry Division) Reorganized and redesignated 1 February 1957 as Headquarters and Headquarters Company, 1st Battle Group, 14th Infantry, and remained assigned to the 25th Infantry Division (organic elements concurrently constituted and activated)

Reorganized and redesignated 26 August 1963 as the 1st Battalion, 14th Infantry

Relieved 1 August 1967 from assignment to the 25th Infantry Division and assigned to the 4th Infantry Division

Relieved 15 December 1970 from assignment to the 4th Infantry Division and assigned to the 25th Infantry Division

Inactivated 3 October 2016 in Hawaii

Campaign participation credit

Civil War
- Peninsula
- Manassas
- Antietam
- Fredericksburg
- Chancellorsville
- Gettysburg
- Wilderness
- Spotsylvania
- Cold Harbor
- Petersburg
- Virginia 1862
- Virginia 1863

Indian Wars

- Little Big Horn
- Bannocks
- Arizona 1866
- Wyoming 1874

Spanish–American War

- Manila

China Relief Expedition Yang-tsun Peking

Philippine–American War

- Manila
- Laguna de Bay
- Zapote River

Cavite

- Luzon 1899

World War II

- Rhineland
- Central Europe

Korean War

- UN Summer-Fall Offensive
- Second Korean Winter
- Korea, Summer-Fall 1952
- Third Korean Winter
- Korea, Summer 1953

Vietnam

- Counteroffensive
- Counteroffensive, Phase II
- Counteroffensive, Phase III
- Tet Counteroffensive
- Counteroffensive, Phase IV
- Counteroffensive, Phase V
- Counteroffensive, Phase VI
- Tet 69/Counteroffensive
- Summer-Fall 1969
- Winter-Spring 1970
- Sanctuary Counteroffensive
- Counteroffensive, Phase VII

Decorations

- Presidential Unit Citation (Navy), Streamer embroidered CHU LAI
- Republic of Korea Presidential Unit Citation, Streamer embroidered MUNSAN-NI
- Republic of Vietnam Cross of Gallantry with Palm, Streamer embroidered VIETNAM 1966-1967
- Republic of Vietnam Cross of Gallantry with Palm, Streamer embroidered VIETNAM 1967-1969
- Republic of Vietnam Cross of Gallantry with Palm, Streamer embroidered VIETNAM 1969-1970
- Republic of Vietnam Civil Action Honor Medal, First Class, Streamer embroidered VIETNAM 1967-1969

Company A additionally entitled to: Valorous Unit Award, Streamer embroidered QUANG NGAI PROVINCE

=== 2nd Battalion ===
Constituted 3 May 1861 in the Regular Army as Company B, 2d Battalion, 14th Infantry

Organized 8 July 1861 at Fort Trumbull, Connecticut

Reorganized and redesignated 30 April 1862 as Company B, 1st Battalion, 14th Infantry

Reorganized and redesignated 21 September 1866 as Company B, 14th Infantry

Consolidated 26 July 1869 with Company A, 45th Infantry, Veteran Reserve Corps (constituted 21 September 1866), and consolidated unit designated as Company B, 14th Infantry (14th Infantry assigned 27 July 1918 to the 19th Division; relieved 14 February 1919 from assignment to the 19th Division; assigned 10 July 1943 to the 71st Light Division [later redesignated as the 71st Infantry Division]; relieved 1 May 1946 from assignment to the 71st Infantry Division)

Inactivated 1 September 1946 in Germany

Activated 1 October 1948 at Camp Carson, Colorado (14th Infantry assigned 1 August 1951 to the 25th Infantry Division)

Inactivated 1 February 1957 at Schofield Barracks, Hawaii, and relieved from assignment to the 25th Infantry Division

Redesignated 17 May 1957 as Headquarters and Headquarters Company, 2d Battle Group, 14th Infantry (organic elements concurrently constituted)

Battle Group activated 25 May 1957 at Fort Benning, Georgia

Assigned 1 July 1958 to the 1st Infantry Brigade

Inactivated 16 May 1960 at Fort Benning, Georgia

Relieved 25 June 1960 from assignment to the 1st Infantry Brigade

- Redesignated 21 June 1963 as the 2d Battalion, 14th Infantry, and assigned to the 25th Infantry Division

Activated 26 August 1963 at Schofield Barracks, Hawaii

Inactivated 5 June 1972 at Schofield Barracks, Hawaii

Relieved 17 January 1986 from assignment to the 25th Infantry Division, assigned to the 10th Mountain Division, and activated at Fort Benning, Georgia

Campaign participation credit

Civil War
- Peninsula
- Manassas
- Antietam
- Fredericksburg
- Chancellorsville
- Gettysburg
- Wilderness
- Spotsylvania
- Cold Harbor
- Petersburg
- Virginia 1862
- Virginia 1863

Indian Wars

- Little Big Horn
- Bannocks
- Arizona 1866
- Wyoming 1874

Spanish–American War Manila

China Relief Expedition Yang-tsun Peking

Philippine–American War Manila

- Laguna de Bay
- Zapote River

Cavite

- Luzon 1899

World War II

- Rhineland
- Central Europe

Korean War

- UN Summer-Fall Offensive
- Second Korean Winter
- Korea, Summer-Fall 1952
- Third Korean Winter
- Korea, Summer 1953

Vietnam

- Counteroffensive
- Counteroffensive, Phase II
- Counteroffensive, Phase III
- Tet Counteroffensive
- Counteroffensive, Phase IV
- Counteroffensive, Phase V
- Counteroffensive, Phase VI
- Tet 69/Counteroffensive
- Summer-Fall 1969
- Winter-Spring 1970
- Sanctuary Counteroffensive
- Counteroffensive, Phase VII

Somalia

- Operation Gothic Serpent

Global War on Terrorism

- Operation Enduring Freedom

- Liberation of Iraq

- Operation Iraqi Freedom

- Transition of Iraq - Iraqi Governance - Iraqi Surge - Iraqi Sovereignty

- Operation New Dawn

Decorations

- Meritorious Unit Commendation (2010)
- Valorous Unit Award, 2006-07 Surge Deployment, in Euphrates River Valley (Permanent Orders 284-003, 10 OCT 2008)
- Valorous Unit Award, Streamer embroidered MOGADISHU
- Republic of Korea Presidential Unit Citation, Streamer embroidered MUNSAN-NI
- Republic of Vietnam Cross of Gallantry with Palm, Streamer embroidered VIETNAM 1966-1968
- Republic of Vietnam Cross of Gallantry with Palm, Streamer embroidered VIETNAM 1968-1970
- Republic of Vietnam Civil Action Honor Medal, First Class, Streamer embroidered VIETNAM 1966-1970

=== 3rd Battalion ===
Lineage and honors

Constituted 3 May 1861 in the Regular Army as Company F, 2d Battalion, 14th Infantry

Organized 8 July 1861 at Fort Trumbull, Connecticut

Reorganized and redesignated 30 April 1862 as Company F, 1st Battalion, 14th Infantry

Reorganized and redesignated 21 September 1866 as Company F, 14th Infantry

Consolidated 26 July 1869 with Company C, 45th Infantry, Veteran Reserve Corps (constituted 21 September 1866), and consolidated unit designated as Company C, 14th Infantry

(14th Infantry assigned 27 July 1918 to the 19th Division; relieved 14 February 1919 from assignment to the 19th Division; assigned 10 July 1943 to the 71st Light Division [later redesignated as the 71st Infantry Division]; relieved 1 May 1946 from assignment to the 71st Infantry Division)

Inactivated 1 September 1946 in Germany

Activated 1 October 1948 at Camp Carson, Colorado

(14th Infantry assigned 1 August 1951 to the 25th Infantry Division)

Inactivated 1 February 1957 at Schofield Barracks, Hawaii, and relieved from assignment to the 25th Infantry Division; concurrently, redesignated as Headquarters and Headquarters Company, 3d Battle Group, 14th Infantry

Withdrawn 11 May 1959 from the Regular Army, allotted to the Army Reserve, and assigned to the 102d Infantry Division (organic elements concurrently constituted)

Battle Group activated 1 June 1959 with headquarters at Kansas City, Missouri (Headquarters and Headquarters Company concurrently consolidated with Headquarters and Headquarters Company, 406th Infantry, and consolidated unit designated as Headquarters and Headquarters Company, 3d Battle Group, 14th Infantry

Reorganized and redesignated 1 April 1963 as the 3d Battalion, 14th Infantry

Inactivated 30 December 1965 at Kansas City, Missouri, and relieved from assignment to the 102d Infantry Division

Withdrawn 6 December 1969 from the Army Reserve, allotted to the Regular Army, assigned to the 25th Infantry Division, and activated at Schofield Barracks, Hawaii

Inactivated 15 December 1970 at Schofield Barracks, Hawaii

Relieved 2 March 1986 from assignment to the 25th Infantry Division, assigned to the 10th Mountain Division, and activated at Fort Benning, Georgia

Inactivated 15 April 1996 at Fort Drum, New York, and relieved from assignment to the 10th Mountain Division

Campaign participation credit

Civil War
- Peninsula
- Manassas
- Antietam
- Fredericksburg

Chancellorsville Gettysburg

- Wilderness
- Spotsylvania
- Cold Harbor
- Petersburg
- Virginia 1862
- Virginia 1863

Indian Wars

- Little Big Horn
- Bannocks

Arizona 1866 Wyoming 1874

War with Spain

- Manila

China Relief Expedition Yang-tsun Peking

Philippine–American War

- Manila
- Laguna de Bay
- Zapote River

Cavite

- Luzon 1899

World War II

- Rhineland
- Central Europe

Korean War

- UN Summer-Fall Offensive
- Second Korean Winter
- Korea, Summer-Fall 1952
- Third Korean Winter
- Korea, Summer 1953

DECORATIONS

- Republic of Korea Presidential Unit Citation, Streamer embroidered MUNSAN-NI

=== 5th Battalion ===
Lineage and honors

Constituted 3 May 1861 in the Regular Army as Company E, 2d Battalion, 14th Infantry

Organized 8 July 1861 at Fort Trumbull, Connecticut

Reorganized and redesignated 30 April 1862 as Company E, 1st Battalion, 14th Infantry

Reorganized and redesignated 21 September 1866 as Company E, 14th Infantry

Consolidated 26 July 1869 with Company D, 45th Infantry, Veteran Reserve Corps (constituted 21 September 1866), and consolidated unit designated as Company E, 14th Infantry

(14th Infantry assigned 27 July 1918 to the 19th Division; relieved 14 February 1919 from assignment to the 19th Division; assigned 10 July 1943 to the 71st Light Division [later redesignated as the 71st Infantry Division]; relieved 1 May 1946 from assignment to the 71st Infantry Division)

Inactivated 1 September 1946 in Germany

Activated 1 October 1948 at Camp Carson, Colorado

(14th Infantry assigned 1 August 1951 to the 25th Infantry Division)

Inactivated 1 February 1957 at Schofield Barracks, Hawaii, and relieved from assignment to the 25th Infantry Division; concurrently, redesignated as Headquarters and Headquarters Company, 5th Battle Group, 14th Infantry

Redesignated 21 December 1960 as Company E, 14th Infantry

Activated 24 December 1960 in Korea

Inactivated 1 January 1966 in Korea

Activated 30 June 1971 in Vietnam

Inactivated 26 November 1972 in Vietnam

Redesignated 16 December 1986 as Headquarters and Headquarters Company, 5th Battalion, 14th Infantry, assigned to the 25th Infantry Division, and activated at Schofield Barracks, Hawaii (organic elements concurrently constituted and activated)

Battalion inactivated 15 August 1995 at Schofield Barracks, Hawaii, and relieved from assignment to the 25th Infantry Division

Campaign participation credit

Civil War
- Peninsula
- Manassas
- Antietam
- Fredericksburg
- Chancellorsville
- Gettysburg
- Wilderness
- Spotsylvania
- Cold Harbor
- Petersburg
- Virginia 1862
- Virginia 1863

Indian Wars Little Big Horn

- Bannocks

Arizona 1866 Wyoming 1874

War with Spain

- Manila

China Relief Expedition

- Yang-tsun
- Peking

Philippine–American War

- Manila
- Laguna de Bay
- Zapote River
- Cavite
- Luzon 1899

World War II

- Rhineland
- Central Europe

Korean War

- UN Summer-Fall Offensive
- Second Korean Winter
- Korea, Summer-Fall 1952
- Third Korean Winter
- Korea, Summer 1953

Vietnam

- Counteroffensive, Phase VII
- Consolidation I
- Consolidation II
- Cease-Fire

Decorations

- Republic of Korea Presidential Unit Citation, Streamer embroidered MUNSAN-NI

== List of Medal of Honor Recipients ==
- Staff Sergeant Travis W. Atkins
- Sergeant Ted Belcher
- Corporal Thomas W. Bennett
- Staff Sergeant Hammett L. Bowen Jr.
- First Lieutenant Joseph X. Grant
- Sergeant Donn F. Porter
- Corporal Calvin P. Titus
- Private First Class Ernest E. West
- Quartermaster Sergeant George C. Williams
- Private First Class Bryant H. Womack

== See also ==
- List of United States Regular Army Civil War units
