= Joseph Grant =

Joseph or Joe Grant may refer to:

- Joseph Grant (poet) (1805–1835), Scottish poet
- Joseph Xavier Grant (1940–1966), United States Army officer and Medal of Honor recipient
- Joe Grant (1908–2005), American artist and writer for the Walt Disney Company
- Joe Grant (cricketer) (born 1967), Jamaican cricketer
- Joe Grant (ice hockey) (1957–2011), Canadian ice hockey player
