= Womack (surname) =

Womack is a surname, and may refer to:

- Amelia Womack (born 1985), deputy leader of the Green Party of England and Wales
- Bobby Womack (1944–2014), American singer, guitarist and songwriter
- Brantly Womack, American political scientist
- Bryant H. Womack (1931–1952), American soldier and recipient of the Medal of Honor
- Cecil Womack (1947–2013), American songwriter and recording artist
- Connie Britton (née Constance Elaine Womack, born 1967), American actress
- Floyd Womack (born 1978), American football player
- Frank Womack (1888–1968), English footballer
- H. Lynn Womack (1923–1985), US publisher, LGBT rights activist
- J. A. Womakck, member of the Illinois Senate during the 47th Illinois General Assembly
- Jack Womack (born 1956), American author
- James E. Womack (born 1941), American biologist
- James P. Womack, American research director of the International Motor Vehicle Program
- John Womack (born 1937), American historian of Mexico and Latin America
- Joy Womack (born 1994), American ballet dancer
- Kenneth Womack (born 1966), an American author and historian, particularly focusing on the Beatles.
- Lakesha Womack, American politician
- Lee Ann Womack (born 1966), American country music artist
- Linda Womack (born 1952), American singer and songwriter
- Mark Womack (born 1960), English actor
- Rob Womack (born 1971), English track and field athlete
- Samantha Womack (born 1972), English actress and singer
- Samuel Womack (born 1999), American football player
- Shawn Womack (born 1972), American politician
- Steve Womack (born 1957), American politician
- Tim Womack (1934–2010), English footballer
- Tommy Womack (born 1962), American singer-songwriter
- Tony Womack (born 1969), American baseball player

== Fictional ==
- James Womack, fictional character in The Rock (film)

== See also ==
- Womack (disambiguation)
- Wommack
