= Wommack =

Wommack is a surname. Notable people with the surname include:

- Andrew Wommack (born 1949), American conservative Evangelical Christian TV evangelist
- Dave Wommack (born 1956), American football coach
- Kane Wommack (born 1987), American football coach and former player
- Roland Wommack (1936–2018), American fencer

== See also ==
- Womack (surname)
