= Calvin Pearl Titus =

United States Army officer (1879–1966)

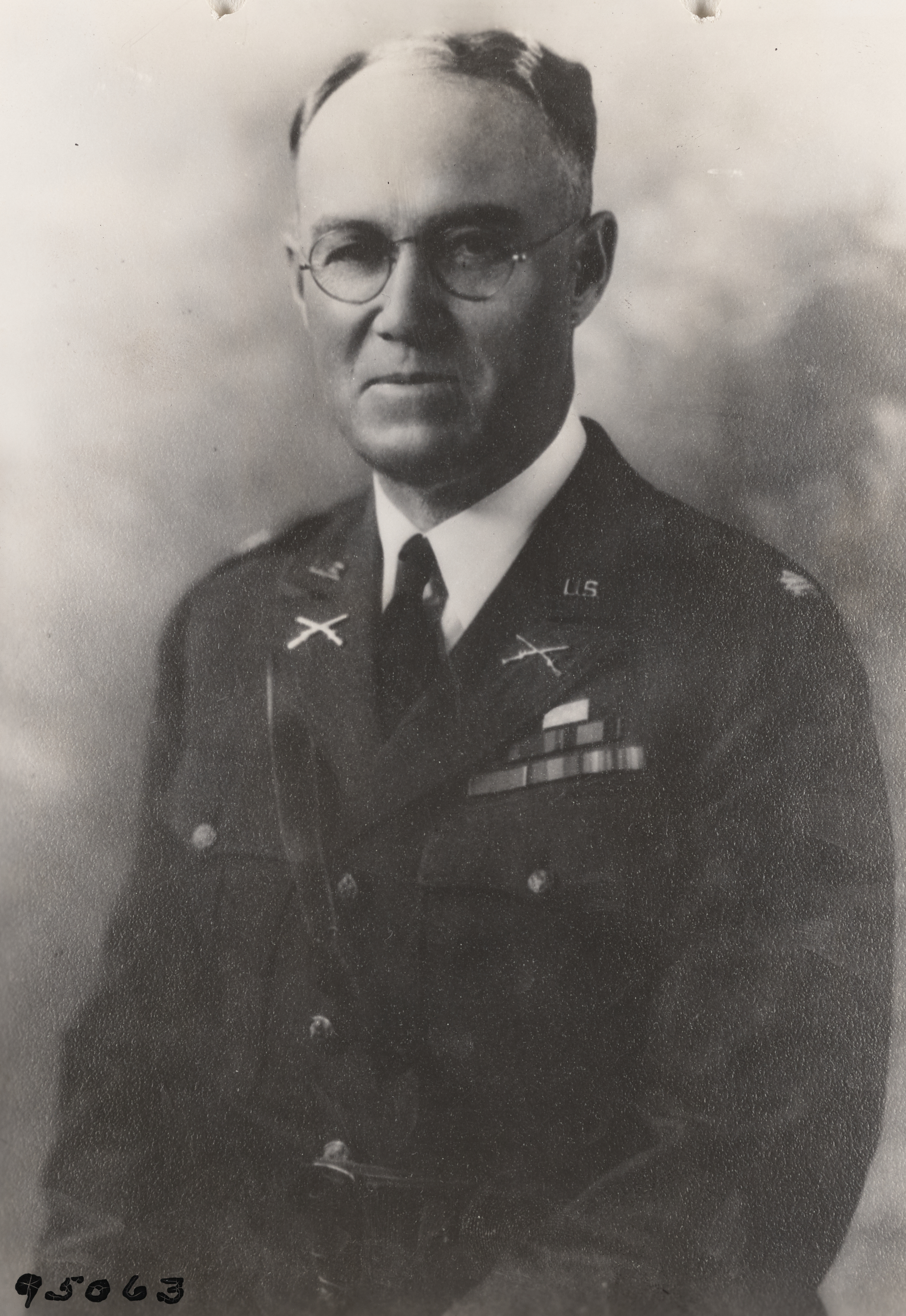
- Titus as a lieutenant colonel c. 1930
- Born: September 22, 1879; Vinton, Iowa, U.S.
- Died: May 27, 1966 (aged 86); Sylmar, California, U.S.
- Burial place: Forest Lawn Memorial Park, Los Angeles
- Military career
- Allegiance: United States of America
- Branch: United States Army
- Service years: 1898–1930
- Rank: Lieutenant Colonel
- Unit: 14th Infantry Regiment
- Conflicts: Philippine–American War; Boxer Rebellion; Battle of Peking; Mexican Expedition
- Awards: Medal of Honor

Calvin Pearl Titus (September 22, 1879 – May 27, 1966) was a soldier of the United States Army and the last American standard-bearer. He received the Medal of Honor for his actions during the Battle of Peking of the Boxer Rebellion. He is known for saying "I'll try, Sir!" before scaling the walls of Peking.

== Biography ==
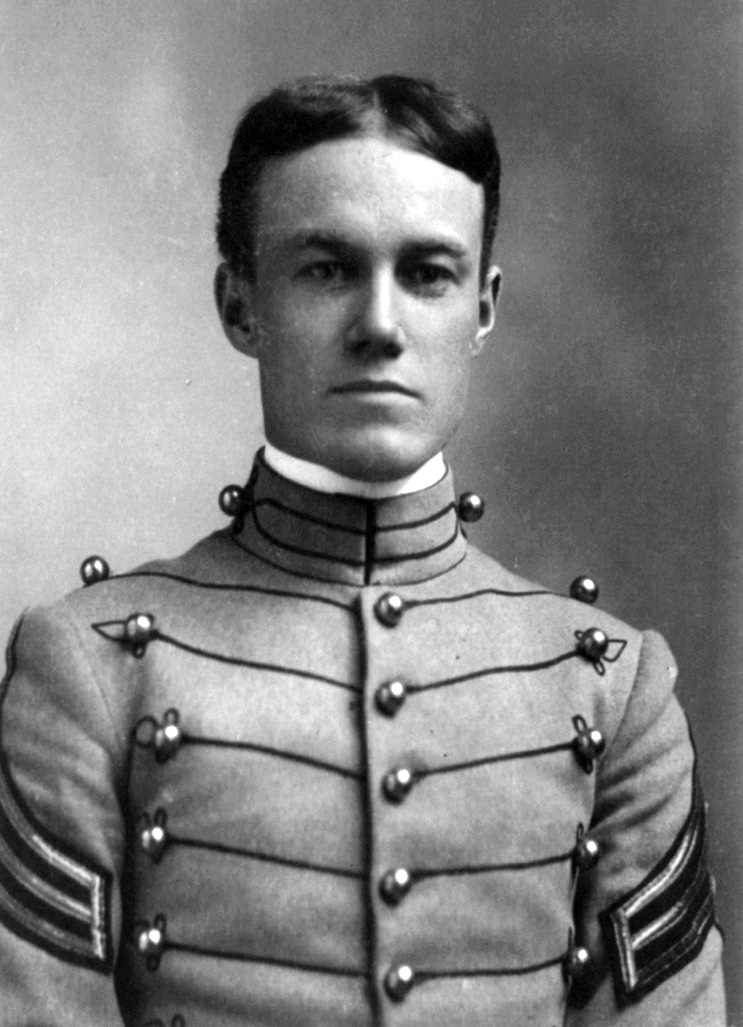
Calvin Titus in his West Point cadet uniform

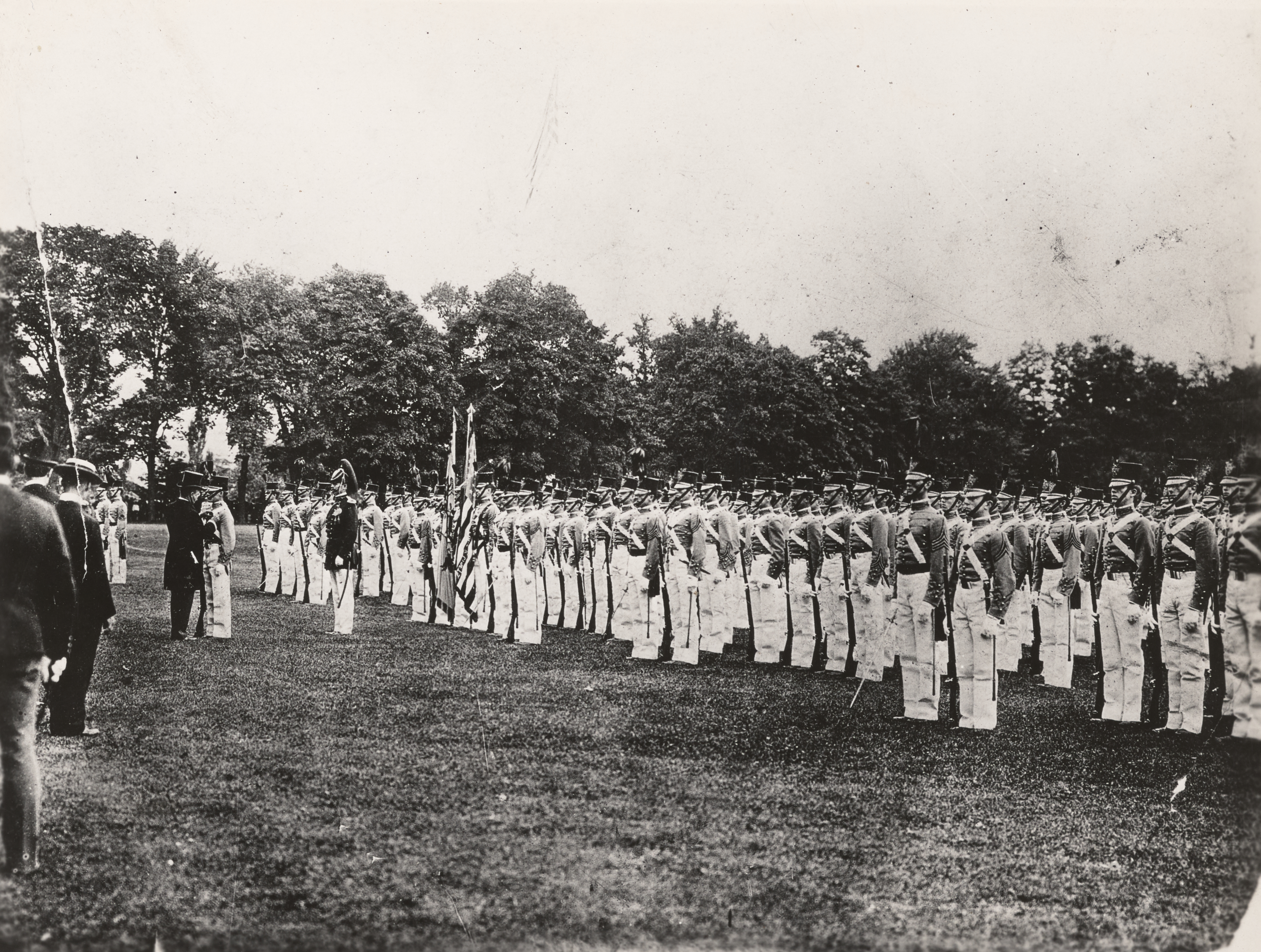
Titus receiving the Medal of Honor from President Roosevelt at West Point c. 1902

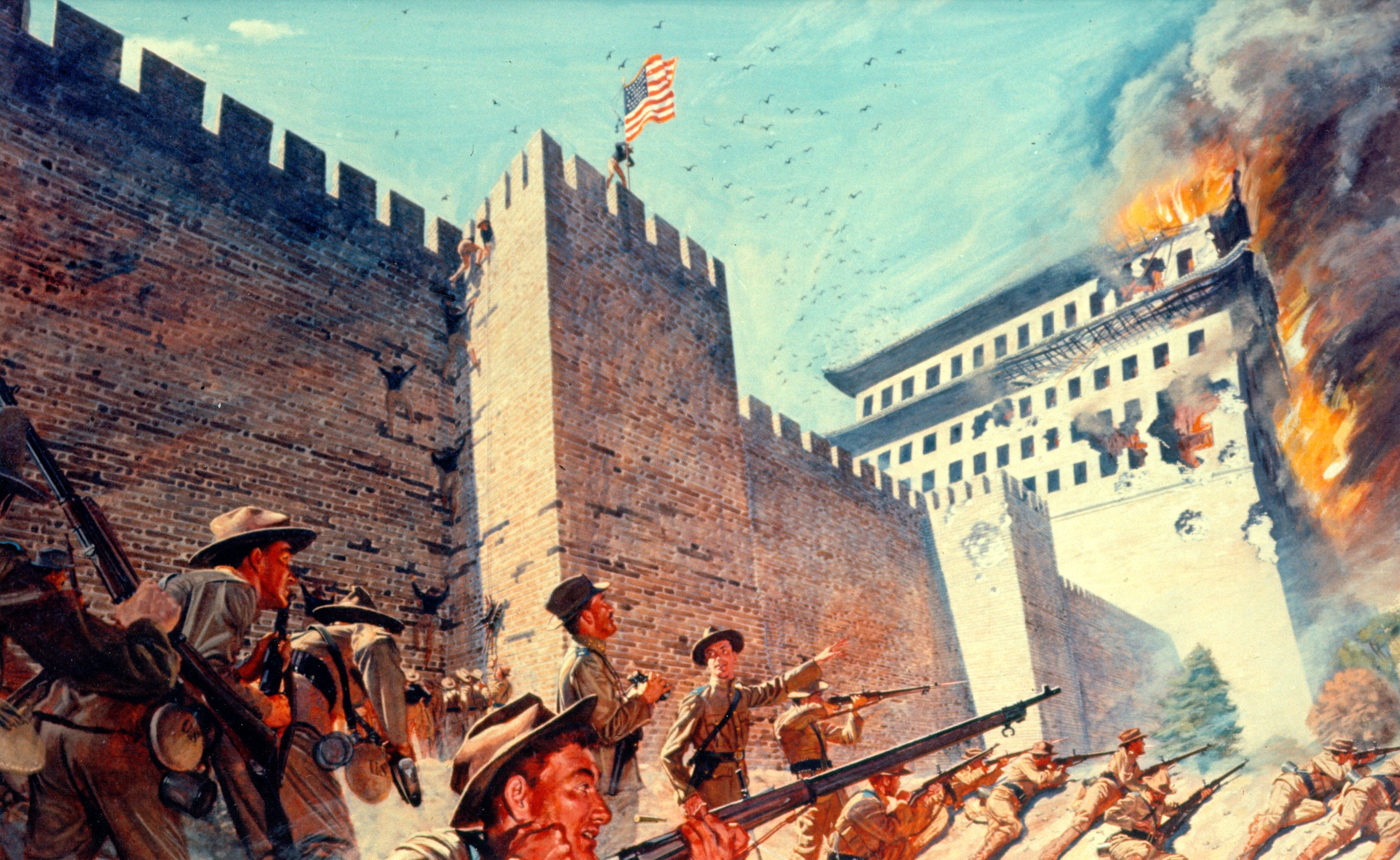
Corporal Titus scaling the walls of Peking

Calvin Pearl Titus was the son of Calvin and Cora Smith Titus of Vinton, Iowa. He moved to Oklahoma with his father after his mother died, and later lived with his Aunt Florence and Uncle William (Bill) H. Lee, evangelists with first the Salvation Army and later the Pilgrim Holiness movement. Titus credited his time in his Uncle's evangelical band with giving him the bugle skills to join the armed forces and eventually leading him to Peking.

Titus first joined the United States Army in May 1898, serving with the 1st Vermont Volunteer Infantry (although raised for the Spanish–American War, this unit never left the United States). He joined the 14th Infantry Regiment in April 1899, serving in the Philippines and China. During the relief expedition to Peking in the Boxer Rebellion in 1900, two companies of the 14th Infantry Regiment were pinned by heavy fire from the east wall of the Tartar City and the Fox Tower between abutments of the Chinese City Wall near Tung Pien Gate. Volunteers were called for to attempt the first perilous ascent of the wall. Titus immediately stepped forward saying, "I'll try, sir!" Using jagged holes in the stone wall, he succeeded in reaching the top. He was followed by the rest of his company, who climbed unarmed, and hauled up their rifles and ammunition belts by a rope made of rifle slings. As the troops ascended the wall, artillery fire set fire to the Fox Tower. For his courageous and daring deed in being the first to climb the wall, Titus was awarded the Medal of Honor.

He was then appointed to West Point as a result of his award of the Medal of Honor, where President Theodore Roosevelt's presentation of his medal there on June 11, 1902, was the climax of a ceremony to celebrate the academy's centennial. He graduated with the West Point Class of 1905.

His religious faith led him to try to become an army chaplain, but his denomination was not at that time recognized by the army. Instead, he rejoined his old regiment as a second lieutenant.

Titus later served in the Mexican Expedition and with the U.S. occupation forces in Germany.

He retired from the United States Army with the rank of lieutenant colonel in October 1930. He died at the Veterans Administration hospital in Sylmar, Los Angeles, and was buried at Forest Lawn Memorial Park.

In September 2016, Titus was honored with the painting of his image of the Benton County Freedom Rock, located in Shellsburg, Iowa.

== Medal of Honor citation ==
Rank and organization: Musician, U.S. Army, Company E, 14th U.S. Infantry. Place and date: At Peking, China, August 14, 1900. Entered service at: Iowa. Birth: Vinton, Iowa. Date of issue: March 11, 1902.

Citation:

Gallant and daring conduct in the presence of his colonel and other officers and enlisted men of his regiment; was first to scale the wall of the city.

== Awards ==
- Medal of Honor
- Spanish War Service Medal
- China Campaign Medal
- Philippine Campaign Medal
- World War I Victory Medal
- Purple Heart

== See also ==
- List of Chaplain Corps Medal of Honor recipients
- List of Medal of Honor recipients
- Boxer Rebellion
