= William Gentles =

- Born: c.1830 County Tyrone, Ireland
- Died: 1878 (aged c48); Camp Douglas, Utah, US
- Military career
- Allegiance: United States
- Branch: United States Army
- Rank: Private
- Units: 10th Infantry; 14th Infantry
- Conflicts: Utah War; Great Sioux War of 1876-77

William Gentles (c.1830–1878) was a private in the U.S. Army who is generally acknowledged as the soldier who bayoneted the Oglala war leader Crazy Horse in 1877.

== Early life ==
William Gentles was born in County Tyrone, Ireland. The exact date is not certain; records suggest various birth dates between 1828 and 1835. He may be the William Gentles born September 30, 1828, the son of Robert and Sarah Gentles. William Gentles immigrated to the United States in 1850, arriving in New York City where he worked as a laborer for several years.

== Utah War ==
On April 2, 1856, Gentles went into the recruiting station in New York City and enlisted in the U.S. Army. He was described in his enlistment record as 5 foot 8½ inches tall, with grey eyes, brown hair and a ruddy complexion. Private Gentles was assigned to Company K Tenth Infantry and sent to Fort Ridgely, Minnesota where he was stationed for the next year.

The perception of a brewing rebellion in Utah Territory prompted President Buchanan to order a large military force be sent west, including the entire Tenth Infantry, as part of the Utah Expedition. Private Gentles departed Fort Ridgely, Minnesota, with his company on June 9, 1857, and arrived at Fort Leavenworth, Kansas, two weeks later. They commenced marching west along the Overland Trail in July, finally reaching Fort Bridger in November. The loss of a supply train to Mormon raiders promised hardships for the soldiers as they settled into winter quarters at Smith's Fork nearby. Captain Randolph B. Marcy was ordered to make a dangerous trek south to Fort Massachusetts to obtain additional supplies and horses. When volunteers were called for, Private William Gentles was one of those who stepped forward. They struggled through deep snow in the mountains and finally reached Fort Massachusetts in January 1858, and returned to Fort Bridger two months later.

Private Gentles was with his company in July 1858 when they moved through Salt Lake City and established Camp Floyd further south. The following month, they were transferred back to Fort Bridger where Gentles remained for the next two years. In June 1860, the company was transferred to Fort Laramie where Gentles completed his first enlistment and was discharged on April 1, 1861.

== Civil War and Reconstruction ==
As a civilian, William Gentles apparently settled in St. Joseph, Missouri. But with the Civil War engulfing the nation, Gentles again enlisted, this time in the 25th Missouri Infantry Regiment, which later became the 1st Missouri Engineer Regiment. He was wounded in the hand at the Battle of Pilot Knob on September 27, 1864. Gentles completed his enlistment in 1864 and re-enlisted as a veteran volunteer. He was mustered out on July 22, 1865, in Louisville, Kentucky.

After the Civil War, Gentles returned to civilian life for two years, apparently in Missouri. Then on June 10, 1867, he enlisted in the Regular Army again. He was sent initially to the recruit depot at Newport Barracks, Kentucky and within days was assigned to Company F 45th Infantry and shipped to Tennessee where the regiment served on Reconstruction duty. In 1869, while stationed in Louisville, Kentucky, the army consolidated a number of regiments and Gentles's company became Company F 14th Infantry.

== Back in the West ==
In the spring of 1870 the 14th Infantry was transferred to the Department of Dakota, with Private Gentles's company assigned to Fort Randall. Two weeks later, the company was sent up the Missouri to Fort Thompson near the Crow Creek Agency. On June 10, 1870, while camped near the agency, Private Gentles re-enlisted for his third enlistment. In August 1870, the regiment was transferred to the Department of the Platte. Traveling on the steamboat The Far West, famous six years later for evacuating the wounded from the Battle of the Little Big Horn, Company F arrived at Omaha Barracks, Nebraska, where they were stationed for the winter. Gentles and Company F transferred to Fort Fetterman, Wyoming, where they served from March 1871 to September 1873 and then to Fort Sanders, Wyoming, until February 1874.

In early 1874, with trouble brewing with the Oglala Lakotas at the Red Cloud Agency in northwestern Nebraska after the killing of an agency clerk, the army dispatched a large contingent of troops to establish military posts near Red Cloud and nearby Spotted Tail Agencies. On February 15, 1874, Private Gentles and Company F entrained to Cheyenne and marched north to Fort Laramie. There they were met by other companies that then marched to Red Cloud Agency, where they encamped for the next four months.

Shortly after returning to Fort Sanders, Private Gentles and Company F were transferred to Camp Douglas, Utah Territory, arriving on September 5, 1874. Camp Douglas was named regimental headquarters for the 14th Infantry, under the command of Colonel John E. Smith. Most of the original log and adobe buildings at the post were in the process of being torn down and replaced by new red sandstone structures, and for the next two years soldiers at the camp, including Private Gentles, were engaged in quarrying and hauling stone as well as other garrison duties. Gentles re-enlisted for his fourth enlistment on June 10, 1875, while at Camp Douglas.

== The Great Sioux War of 1876-77 ==
In May 1876 Brigadier General George Crook led an expedition into Montana to engage traditionalist bands of Lakotas and Northern Cheyennes who refused reservation life. After his near defeat in the Battle of the Rosebud, Crook called for reinforcements and encamped for much of the summer in the lee of the Big Horn Mountains, awaiting their arrival. Meanwhile, an ever growing village of Lakotas and Cheyennes defeated Custer's command at the Battle of the Little Bighorn on June 25.

Orders detailed Companies B and F, Fourteenth Infantry, at Fort Douglas to join Crook in the field. Traveling by train to Cheyenne, Private Gentles and his company marched north to Fort Fetterman, where in turn they departed on July 4, 1876, for General Crook's camp. Crook resumed the campaign trail in August, following various Indians trails but failing to find any sizable village as the traditionalists began to scatter. Exhausting its supplies, Crook's column made a desperate turn south to the Black Hills in what became famous as the Horsemeat March.

Crook closed his campaign that fall and Gentles's Company F 14th Infantry was assigned to duty at Fort Robinson, Nebraska. Through the fall and winter the camp's garrison patrolled the Sidney-Deadwood Trail and engaged in normal post activities. During the spring of 1877 Camp Robinson's soldiers witnessed the surrender of large bands of Northern Cheyennes and Lakotas at the nearby Red Cloud Agency, culminating with the surrender of Crazy Horse on May 5, 1877.

Private Gentles's name appears in the post records but once, when in August 1877 he was tried by garrison court-martial and sentenced to twenty days in the post guardhouse.

== The Death of Crazy Horse ==
On the late afternoon of September 5, 1877, Crazy Horse was brought to Camp Robinson. While attempting to place him in the guardhouse, he struggled and the famed Oglala war leader was fatally bayoneted. At the time, there was considerable confusion as to how Crazy Horse had been wounded but a member of the guard detail that evening, Private Edwin D. Wood, wrote plainly of seeing a soldier bayonet Crazy Horse. Nearly all later eyewitness accounts collected by various historians confirm that a soldier was responsible. The identity of that individual, however, remained unknown for decades. No official army records note the name.

In 1903, a former sergeant of the 14th Infantry, giving his name as William F. Kelly, told a Washington Post reporter what he had seen that evening at Camp Robinson. "It was an exciting moment, when no one knew just what to do," Kelly explained, recalling the struggle outside the guardhouse door between Crazy Horse and Little Big Man. "Suddenly, as the men surged forward in the direction of where I was standing, I saw Wm. Gentles, an old soldier and a veteran of the Mormon campaign of 1857, give Crazy Horse a thrust with his bayonet. The thrust was delivered with lightning-like rapidity, and in the next instant, he had his gun at carry, as though nothing had happened. Crazy Horse gave a deep groan, staggered forward and dropped his knife and fell." The article was widely reprinted in newspapers that year, including the Denver Post and Crawford Tribune.

Most writers have since accepted Sergeant Kelly's claim without question. Classic works on Crazy Horse by E. A. Brininstool, David Humphreys Miller, and Mari Sandoz repeated Gentles' name as the soldier directly complicit in the stabbing. Custer scholar John Carroll, in his introduction to Richard Hardorff's book on the genealogy of Crazy Horse, provided a brief biography of the man. Later day Crazy Horse biographers, Kingsley Bray and Thomas Powers, both acknowledge Gentles even while nagging issues associated with the identification plagued the story, as did the occasional surfacing of other names of individuals who may have been on the scene and wielded the bayonet.

The matter was investigated carefully in 1996 by historian Ephriam Dickson, who directly challenged the identification of Gentles as the soldier responsible, questioning but never resolving issues surrounding the identity of William F. Kelly, the man who put forward Gentles' name in 1903. Dickson concluded that enough uncertainty clouded Kelly's own identity that one should doubt, in turn, his naming Gentles as the man who stabbed the chief.

More recently, historian Paul L. Hedren, working closely with Dickson, investigated the case more carefully, and for the first time settled the questionable identity of William Kelly, which in turn settled the issues surrounding the identity of William Gentles. No longer is there any doubt that the soldier at the Camp Robinson guardhouse door, Private William Gentles, stabbed Crazy Horse.

== Death ==
Company F, 14th Infantry, departed Camp Robinson on November 4, 1877. Private William Gentles remained behind for several weeks, perhaps packing company baggage, but soon joined his company at Camp Douglas, Utah.

In May 1878, suffering from asthma, Private Gentles was admitted to the post hospital at Camp Douglas, where he died on May 20, 1878. Gentles was buried several days later in the post cemetery.
