= Ted Belcher =

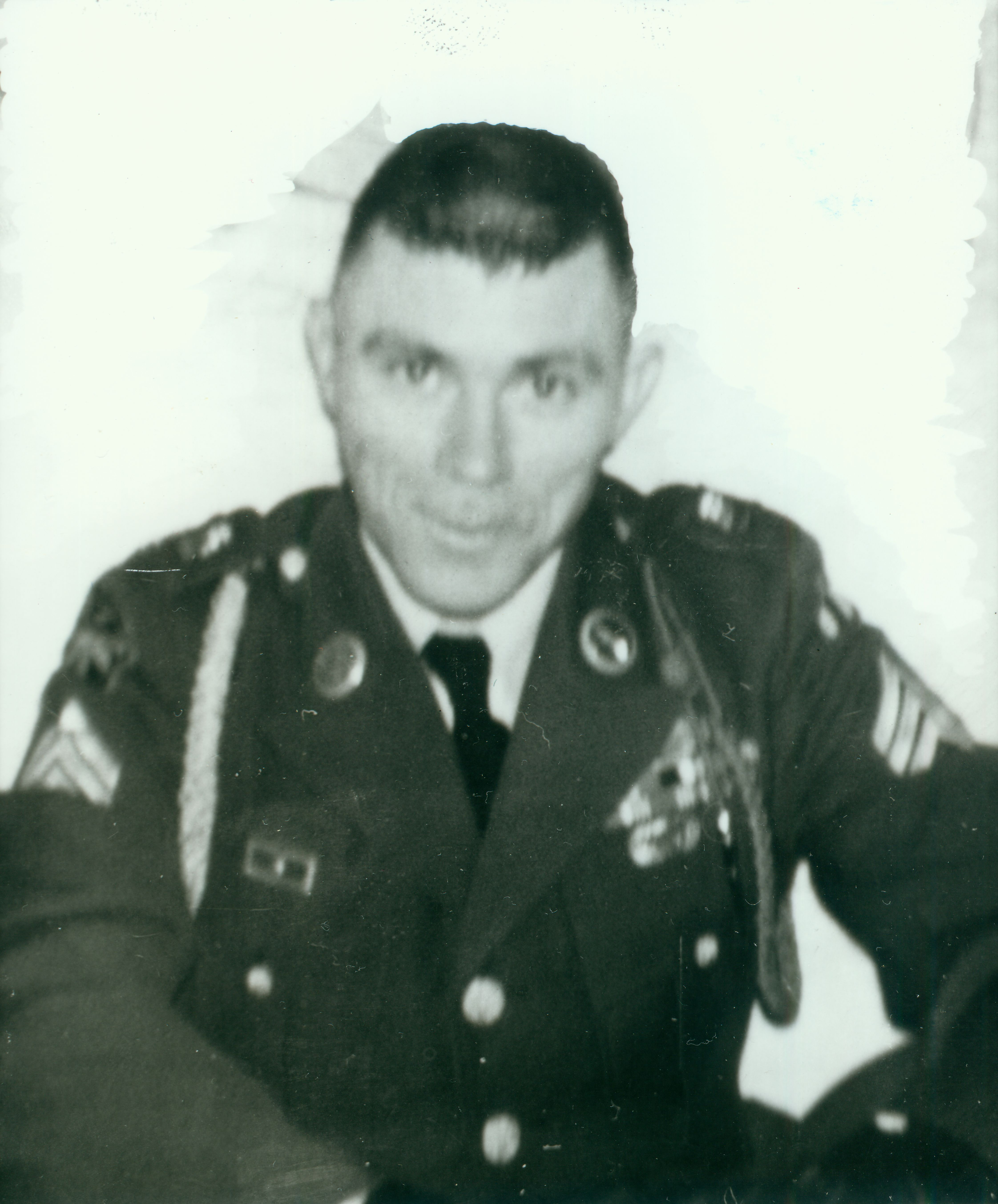
- Medal of Honor recipient
- Born: July 21, 1924; Accoville, West Virginia, US
- Died: November 19, 1966 (aged 42); Plei Djereng, Pleiku Province, Republic of Vietnam
- Military career
- Allegiance: United States
- Branch: United States Army
- Service years: 1943–1966
- Rank: Sergeant
- Units: Company C, 1st Battalion, 14th Infantry Regiment, 25th Infantry Division
- Conflicts: World War II; Vietnam War †
- Awards: Medal of Honor; Purple Heart; National Defense Medal; Vietnam Service Medal; Vietnam Campaign Medal

Ted Belcher (July 21, 1924 – November 19, 1966) was a United States Army soldier and a recipient of the United States military's highest decoration—the Medal of Honor—for his actions in the Vietnam War. He was also a recipient of a Purple Heart, a National Defense Medal, and both the Vietnam Service and Vietnam Campaign Medals.

== Biography ==
Belcher joined the Army from Huntington, West Virginia in April 1943, and served in World War II. By November 19, 1966, he was serving as a Sergeant in Company C, 1st Battalion, 14th Infantry Regiment, 25th Infantry Division. On that day, at Plei Djereng Camp in the Republic of Vietnam, Belcher smothered the blast of an enemy-thrown hand grenade with his body, sacrificing himself to protect those around him.

== Medal of Honor citation ==
Sergeant Belcher's official Medal of Honor citation reads:

Distinguishing himself by conspicuous gallantry and intrepidity at the risk of his life. Sgt. Belcher's unit was engaged in a search and destroy mission with Company B, 1st Battalion, 14th Infantry, the Battalion Reconnaissance Platoon and a special forces company of civilian irregular defense group personnel. As a squad leader of the 2d Platoon of Company C, Sgt. Belcher was leading his men when they encountered a bunker complex. The reconnaissance platoon, located a few hundred meters northwest of Company C, received a heavy volume of fire from well camouflaged snipers. As the 2d Platoon moved forward to assist the unit under attack, Sgt. Belcher and his squad, advancing only a short distance through the dense jungle terrain, met heavy and accurate automatic weapons and sniper fire. Sgt. Belcher and his squad were momentarily stopped by the deadly volume of enemy fire. He quickly gave the order to return fire and resume the advance toward the enemy. As he moved up with his men, a hand grenade landed in the midst of the sergeant's squad. Instantly realizing the immediate danger to his men, Sgt. Belcher, unhesitatingly and with complete disregard for his safety, lunged forward, covering the grenade with his body. Absorbing the grenade blast at the cost of his life, he saved his comrades from becoming casualties. Sgt. Belcher's profound concern for his fellow soldiers, at the risk of his life above and beyond the call of duty are in keeping with the highest traditions of the U.S. Army and reflect credit upon himself and the Armed Forces of his country.

== See also ==
- List of Medal of Honor recipients for the Vietnam War
