= Donn F. Porter =

United States Army Medal of Honor recipient

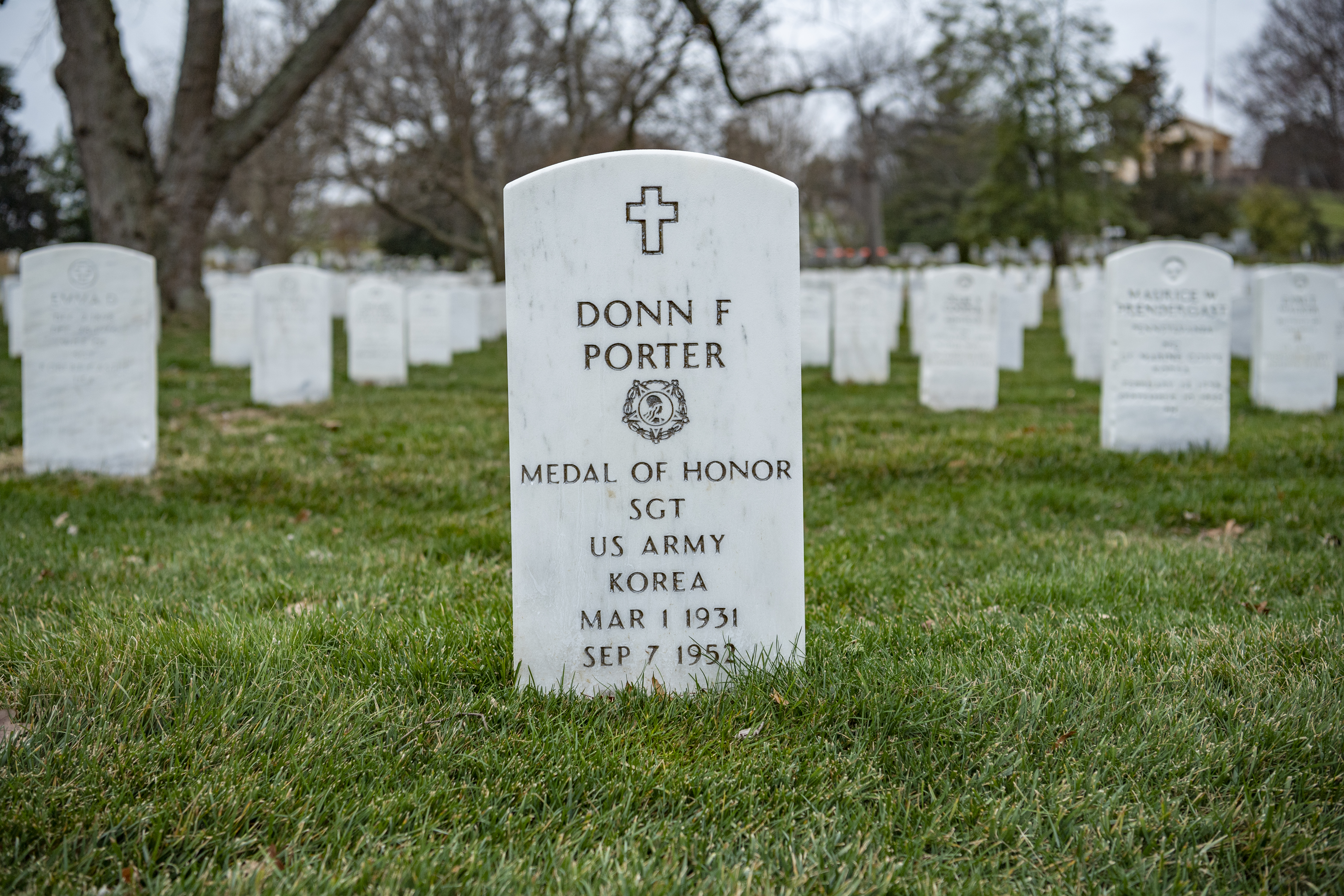
- Grave at Arlington National Cemetery
- Born: March 1, 1931; Sewickley, Pennsylvania, US
- Died: September 7, 1952 (aged 21); Near Mundung-ni, Korea
- Burial place: Arlington National Cemetery
- Military career
- Allegiance: United States
- Branch: United States Army
- Service years: 1951–1952
- Rank: Sergeant
- Nickname: "Pinky"
- Units: 187th Airborne Infantry Regiment; Company G, 14th Infantry Regiment, 25th Infantry Division
- Conflicts: Korean War †
- Awards: Medal of Honor; Purple Heart

Donn Fotheringham Porter (March 1, 1931 – September 7, 1952) was a soldier in the United States Army during the Korean War. He posthumously received the Medal of Honor for his actions on September 7, 1952.

Porter joined the Army from Baltimore, Maryland in 1951, and originally trained as an airborne ranger. He is buried in Arlington National Cemetery Arlington, Virginia. His grave can be found in Section 33, Lot 4357.

== Medal of Honor citation ==
Rank and organization: Sergeant, U.S. Army, Company G, 14th Infantry Regiment, 25th Infantry Division

Place and date: Near Mundung-ni, Korea, September 7, 1952

Entered service at: Baltimore, Md. Born: March 1, 1931, Sewickley, Pa. Graduated Saint James School, MD. Class of 1949

G.O. No.: 64, August 18, 1953.

Citation:

Sgt. Porter, a member of Company G, distinguished himself by conspicuous gallantry and outstanding courage above and beyond the call of duty in action against the enemy. Advancing under cover of intense mortar and artillery fire, 2 hostile platoons attacked a combat outpost commanded by Sgt. Porter, destroyed communications, and killed 2 of his 3-man crew. Gallantly maintaining his position, he poured deadly accurate fire into the ranks of the enemy, killing 15 and dispersing the remainder. After falling back under a hail of fire, the determined foe reorganized and stormed forward in an attempt to overrun the outpost. Without hesitation, Sgt. Porter jumped from his position with bayonet fixed and, meeting the onslaught and in close combat, killed 6 hostile soldiers and routed the attack. While returning to the outpost, he was killed by an artillery burst, but his courageous actions forced the enemy to break off the engagement and thwarted a surprise attack on the main line of resistance. Sgt. Porter's incredible display of valor, gallant self-sacrifice, and consummate devotion to duty reflect the highest credit upon himself and uphold the noble traditions of the military service.

== Awards and decorations ==
Sergeant Porter was awarded the following medals for his service

Badge	Combat Infantryman Badge		
1st row	Medal of Honor	Purple Heart	National Defense Service Medal
2nd row	Korean Service Medal with 1 Campaign star	United Nations Service Medal Korea	Korean War Service Medal Retroactively Awarded, 2003
Badge	Parachutist Badge		
Unit Awards	Korean Presidential Unit Citation		

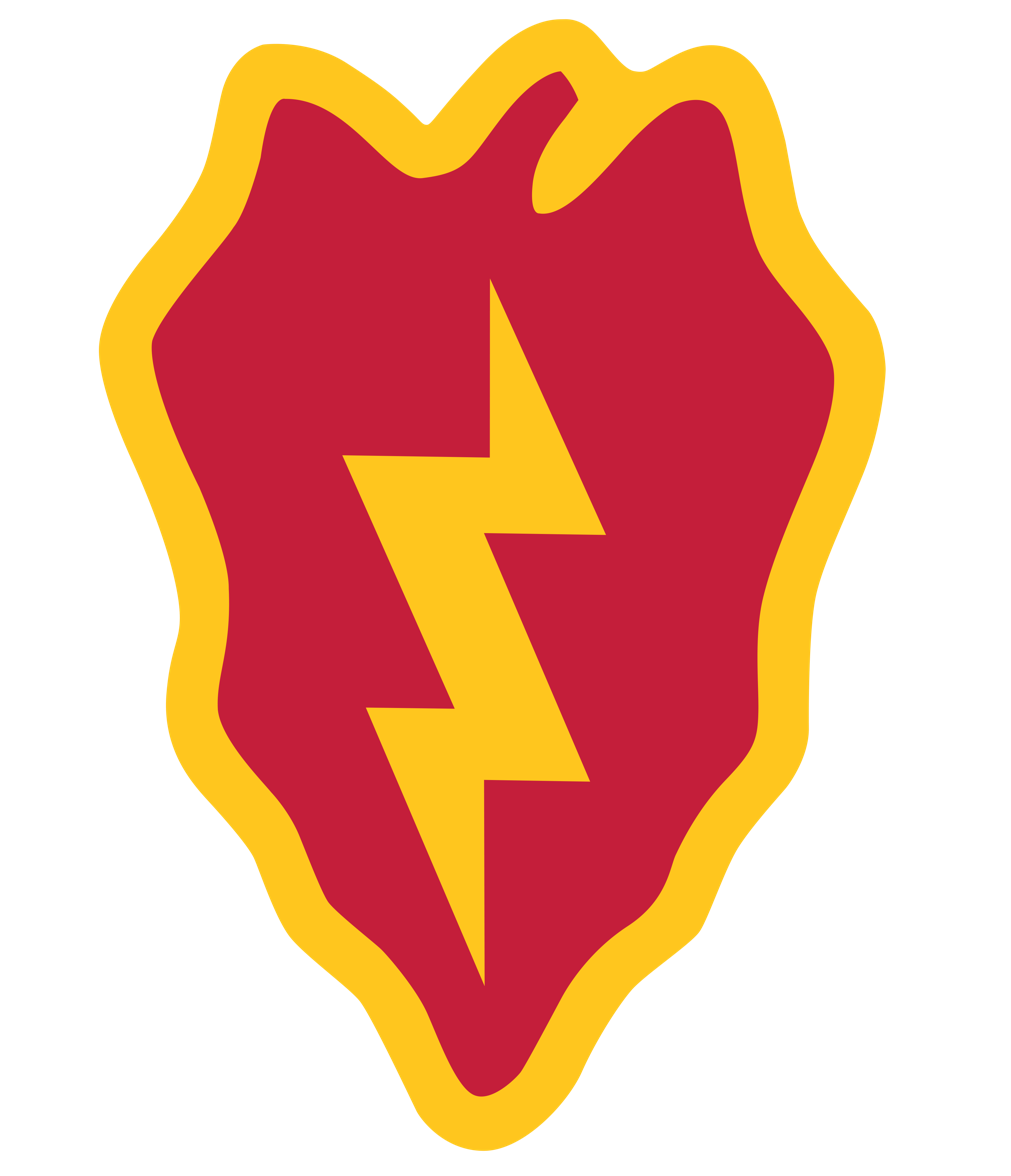

25th Infantry Division Insignia

== See also ==
- List of Medal of Honor recipients
- List of Korean War Medal of Honor recipients
