= Hammett L. Bowen Jr. =

Hammett Lee Bowen Jr.
- Medal of Honor Recipient
- Born: November 30, 1947; LaGrange, Georgia, US
- Died: June 27, 1969 (aged 21); Bình Dương Province, Republic of Vietnam
- Burial place: Restlawn Memory Gardens LaGrange, Georgia
- Military career
- Allegiance: United States
- Branch: United States Army
- Service years: 1965–1969
- Rank: Staff Sergeant
- Units: Company C, 2d Battalion, 14th Infantry Regiment, 25th Infantry Division
- Conflicts: Vietnam War †
- Awards: Medal of Honor; Purple Heart

Hammett Lee Bowen Jr. (November 30, 1947 – June 27, 1969) was a United States Army soldier and a recipient of the United States military's highest decoration—the Medal of Honor—for his actions in the Vietnam War.

== Biography ==
Bowen joined the Army from Jacksonville, Florida in 1965, and received basic training at Fort Campbell, Kentucky. He then was sent to Fort Benning, Georgia, to attend the Non-Commissioned Officer Course (NCOC). Bowen was in Class 4–68, where he graduated as an infantryman NCO. By June 27, 1969, was serving as a staff sergeant in Company C, 2d Battalion, 14th Infantry Regiment, 25th Infantry Division. On that day, in Bình Dương Province, South Vietnam, during Operation Toan Thang III, Bowen smothered the blast of an enemy-thrown hand grenade with his body, sacrificing himself to protect those around him.

== Medal of Honor citation ==
Staff Sergeant Bowen's official Medal of Honor citation reads:

S/Sgt. Bowen distinguished himself while serving as a platoon sergeant during combat operations in Binh Duong Province, Republic of Vietnam. S/Sgt. Bowen's platoon was advancing on a reconnaissance mission into enemy controlled terrain when it came under the withering crossfire of small arms and grenades from an enemy ambush force. S/Sgt. Bowen placed heavy suppressive fire on the enemy positions and ordered his men to fall back. As the platoon was moving back, an enemy grenade was thrown amid S/Sgt. Bowen and 3 of his men. Sensing the danger to his comrades, S/Sgt. Bowen shouted a warning to his men and hurled himself on the grenade, absorbing the explosion with his body while saving the lives of his fellow soldiers. S/Sgt. Bowen's extraordinary courage and concern for his men at the cost of his life served as an inspiration to his comrades and are in the highest traditions of the military service and the U.S. Army.

Bowen's Medal of Honor and other memorabilia about his life are on display in the lobby of the Hammett Bowen Operations Center for the Marion County Sheriff's Office. Ocala Florida.

Hammett Bowen Jr. Elementary School in Ocala, Florida, is named in his honor.

== See also ==
- List of Medal of Honor recipients for the Vietnam War
