= Womack Army Medical Center =

Military hospital in North Carolina, United States

Coordinates: 35.1456°N 79.0032°W

- Fort Bragg
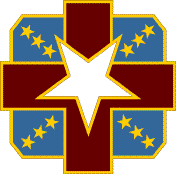
- Distinctive Unit Insignia

Site information
- Type: Military hospital
- Controlled by: United States Army Medical Department

Site history
- Built: 2000 (current structure)

Garrison information
- Current commander: COL Kane D. Morgan; CSM Jackie S. Mims

Womack Army Medical Center (WAMC) is a United States Army-run military hospital that is located on Fort Bragg near Fayetteville, North Carolina. The facility is named for Medal of Honor recipient Bryant H. Womack. It contains 138 beds, with about 66,000 patients visiting the hospital's emergency department, and more than 11,000 patients are admitted yearly. Its physicians perform about 2,700 inpatient and 7,400 outpatient surgeries each year. The Medical Center serves more than 160,000 eligible beneficiaries in the region, the largest beneficiary population in the Army.

== History ==
Camp Bragg Base Hospital was the first military hospital at then Camp Bragg. It was built in September 1918 with two dispensaries and a headquarters. The hospital was a 500-bed facility located in 22 buildings.

USA Station Hospital One was built after the first hospital was closed in 1919. It was built in June, 1932 with an 83-bed, three-story facility. It closed in 1941 once USA Station Hospital Number Two and Three were built.

USA Station Hospital Number Two and Three were two hospitals built in February 1941. USA Station Hospital Two has 1,680 beds, and USA Station Hospital Three has 1,002 beds.

On August 3, 1958, the nine-story, 500-bed-capacity Womack Army Community Hospital opened. The Womack Ambulatory Patient Care Annex opened in March 1974. On October 1, 1991, Womack changed its name to Womack Army Medical Center, Fort Bragg. One year later, on September 3, 1992, officials broke ground for a new Womack.

The center has been awarded the Army Superior Unit Award in 1991 and 1994.

On March 9, 2000, the new Womack Army Medical Center opened for $400 million. It is 1,020,359 square feet in size and sits on a 163-acre wooded site.

On June 9, 2017, Womack Army Medical Center earned the Joint Commission’s Gold Seal of Approval for hospital accreditation by demonstrating continuous compliance with its performance standards.
