= Joseph Xavier Grant =

United States Army officer and a recipient of the Medal of Honor (1940-1966)

- Army Medal of Honor
- Born: March 28, 1940; Cambridge, Massachusetts, US
- Died: November 13, 1966 (aged 26); Republic of Vietnam
- Burial place: Arlington National Cemetery
- Military career
- Allegiance: United States
- Branch: United States Army
- Service years: 1958–1966
- Rank: Captain (posthumous)
- Units: 14th Infantry Regiment, 25th Infantry Division
- Conflicts: Vietnam War †
- Awards: Medal of Honor; Purple Heart

Joseph Xavier Grant (March 28, 1940 – November 13, 1966) was a United States Army officer and a recipient of the United States military's highest decoration—the Medal of Honor—for his actions in the Vietnam War.

== Biography ==
Grant joined the Army from Boston, Massachusetts, in 1958, and was killed in action on November 13, 1966, was serving as a first lieutenant in Company A, 1st Battalion, 14th Infantry Regiment, 25th Infantry Division. During a firefight on that day in the Republic of Vietnam, Grant organized his group's defense and repeatedly exposed himself to enemy fire to rescue wounded soldiers, despite being wounded himself, before he was killed in a mortar attack. He was posthumously promoted to captain and, on January 29, 1968, President Johnson issued the Medal of Honor for his actions during the battle.

Grant, aged 26 at his death, was buried at Arlington National Cemetery, Arlington County, Virginia.

== Medal of Honor citation ==
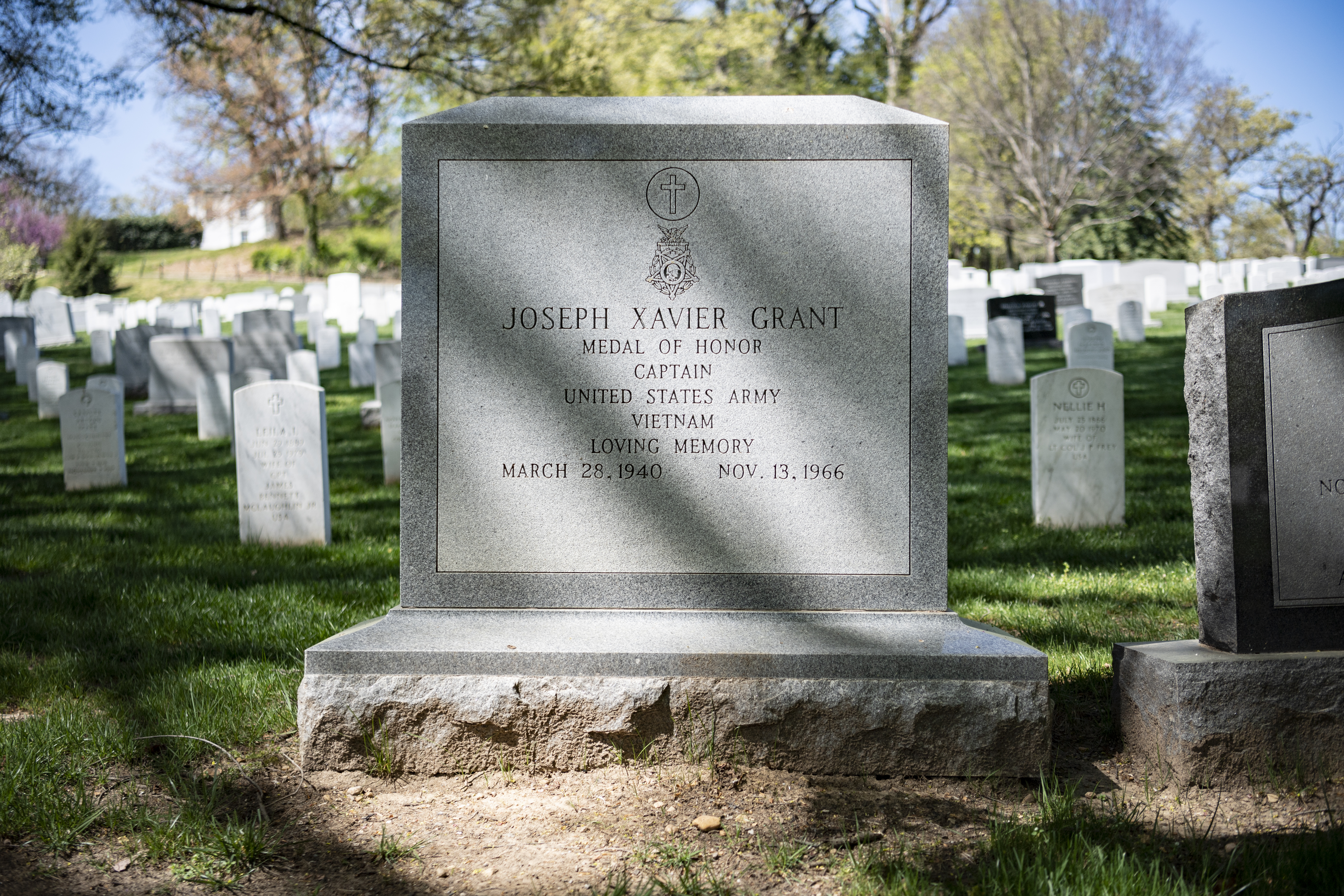
Grave at Arlington National Cemetery

Captain Grant's official Medal of Honor citation reads:

For conspicuous gallantry and intrepidity in action at the risk of his life above and beyond the call of duty. Company A was participating in a search and destroy operation when the leading platoon made contact with the enemy and a fierce fire-fight ensued. Capt. Grant was ordered to disengage the 2 remaining platoons and to maneuver them to envelop and destroy the enemy. After beginning their movement, the platoons encountered intense enemy automatic weapons and mortar fire from the front and flank. Capt. Grant was ordered to deploy the platoons in a defensive position. As this action was underway, the enemy attacked, using "human wave" assaults, in an attempt to literally overwhelm Capt. Grant's force. In a magnificent display of courage and leadership, Capt. Grant moved under intense fire along the hastily formed defensive line repositioning soldiers to fill gaps created by the mounting casualties and inspiring and directing the efforts of his men to successfully repel the determined enemy onslaught. Seeing a platoon leader wounded, Capt. Grant hastened to his aid, in the face of the mass of fire of the entire enemy force, and moved him to a more secure position. During this action, Capt. Grant was wounded in the shoulder. Refusing medical treatment, he returned to the forward part of the perimeter, where he continued to lead and to inspire his men by his own indomitable example. While attempting to evacuate a wounded soldier, he was pinned down by fire from an enemy machine gun. With a supply of hand grenades, he crawled forward under a withering hail of fire and knocked out the machine gun, killing the crew, after which he moved the wounded man to safety. Learning that several other wounded men were pinned down by enemy fire forward of his position, Capt. Grant disregarded his painful wound and led 5 men across the fire-swept open ground to effect a rescue. Following return of the wounded men to the perimeter, a concentration of mortar fire landed in their midst and Capt. Grant was killed instantly. His heroic actions saved the lives of a number of his comrades and enabled the task force to repulse the vicious assaults and defeat the enemy. Capt. Grant's actions reflect great credit upon himself and were in keeping with the finest traditions of the U.S. Army.

== See also ==
- List of Medal of Honor recipients for the Vietnam War
