= Bryant H. Womack =

United States Army Medal of Honor recipient

Bryant Homer Womack
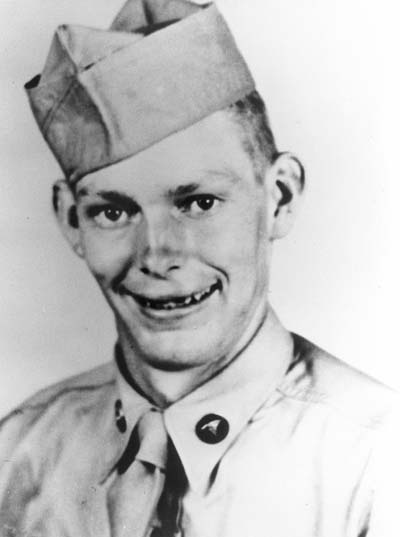
- Private First Class Bryant Womack
- Born: May 12, 1931; Mill Spring, North Carolina, U.S.
- Died: March 12, 1952 (aged 20) near Sokso-ri, Korea
- Burial place: Lebanon Methodist Church; Polk County, North Carolina, U.S.
- Military career
- Allegiance: United States
- Branch: United States Army
- Service years: 1950–1952
- Rank: Private First Class
- Units: Medical Company, 14th Infantry Regiment, 25th Infantry Division
- Conflicts: Korean War (DOW)
- Awards: Medal of Honor; Purple Heart

Bryant Homer Womack (May 12, 1931 – March 12, 1952) was a United States Army soldier during the Korean War. He posthumously received the Medal of Honor for his actions on March 12, 1952. Womack Army Medical Center, Fort Bragg, North Carolina, is named for him.

== Early life and education ==
Womack was born and raised in Mill Spring, in Polk County, North Carolina. He was the son of George and Julie Womack and had three brothers and one sister. He grew up working as a farm laborer and picked peaches during the summer. He enjoyed hunting, fishing, and riding bicycles.

== Career ==
Womack was drafted into the U.S. Army in 1950 and sent to Korea as a private first class with the Medical Company of the 14th Infantry Regiment, 25th Infantry Division. During a firefight on March 12, 1952, near Soksa-ri, his unit began taking heavy casualties. Womack exposed himself to enemy fire in order to treat wounded soldiers. When he was himself wounded, he refused medical treatment and continued to give aid to others. He was the last soldier to withdraw from the engagement and died of his injuries soon after. He was officially issued the Medal of Honor the next year, on January 12, 1953.

Aged 20 at his death, Womack was buried at Lebanon Methodist Church in his hometown of Mill Spring.

=== Medal of Honor citation ===
Rank and organization: Private First Class, U.S. Army, Medical Company, 14th Infantry Regiment, 25th Infantry Division

Place and date: Near Sokso-ri, Korea, March 12, 1952

Entered service at: Mill Springs, N.C. Birth: Mill Springs, North Carolina

G.O. No.: 5, January 12, 1953

Citation:

Pfc. Womack distinguished himself by conspicuous gallantry above and beyond the call of duty in action against the enemy. Pfc. Womack was the only medical aid man attached to a night combat patrol when sudden contact with a numerically superior enemy produced numerous casualties. Pfc. Womack went immediately to their aid, although this necessitated exposing himself to a devastating hail of enemy fire, during which he was seriously wounded. Refusing medical aid for himself, he continued moving among his comrades to administer aid. While he was aiding 1 man, he was again struck by enemy mortar fire, this time suffering the loss of his right arm. Although he knew the consequences should immediate aid not be administered, he still refused aid and insisted that all efforts be made for the benefit of others that were wounded. Although unable to perform the task himself, he remained on the scene and directed others in first aid techniques. The last man to withdraw, he walked until he collapsed from loss of blood, and died a few minutes later while being carried by his comrades. The extraordinary heroism, outstanding courage, and unswerving devotion to his duties displayed by Pfc. Womack reflect the utmost distinction upon himself and uphold the esteemed traditions of the U.S. Army.

== Awards and decorations ==

Badge	Combat Medical Badge		
1st row	Medal of Honor		
2nd row	Purple Heart	Army Good Conduct Medal	National Defense Service Medal
3rd row	Korean Service Medal with 1 Campaign star	United Nations Service Medal Korea	Korean War Service Medal Retroactively Awarded, 2003
Unit awards	Korean Presidential Unit Citation		

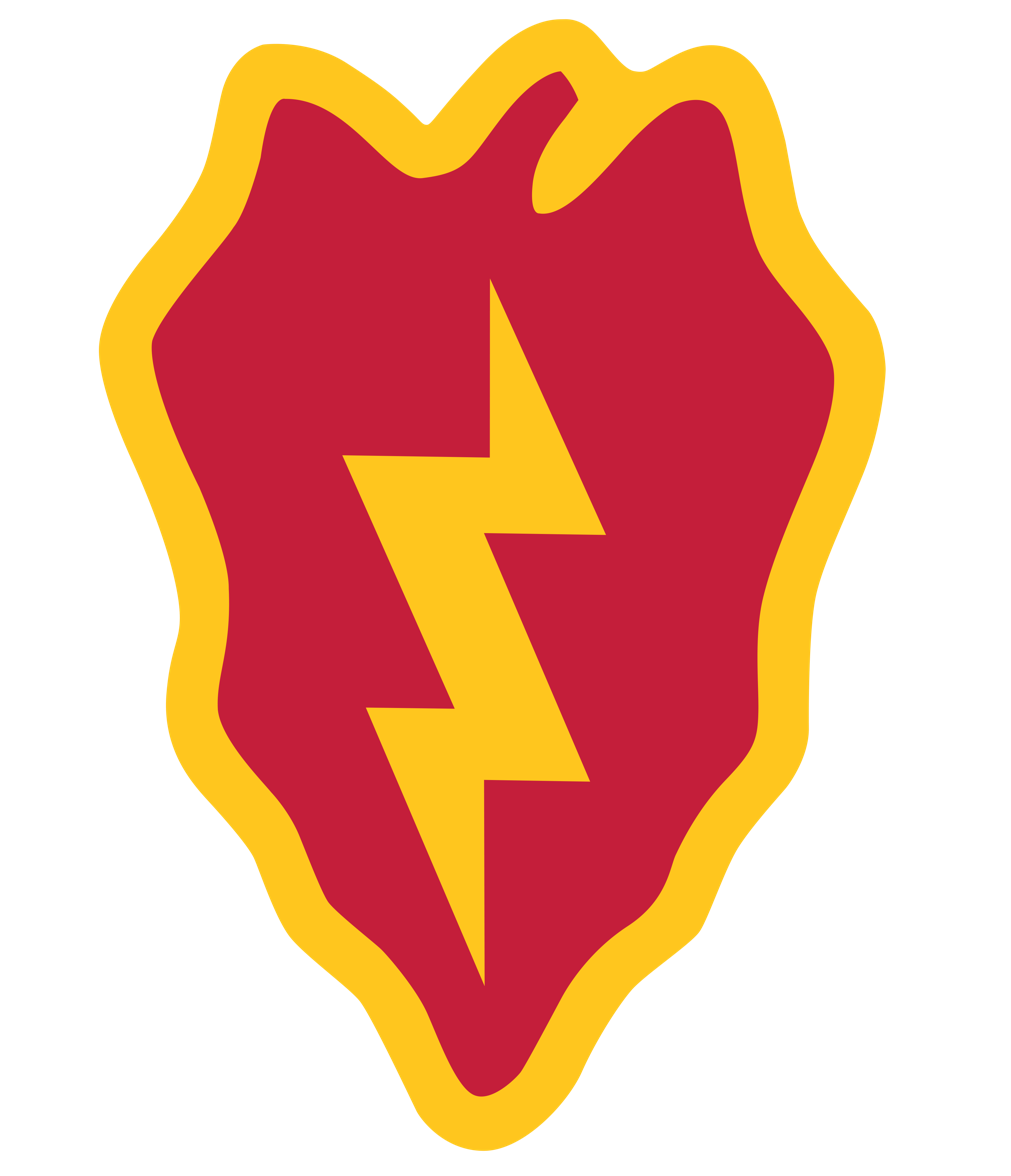

25th Infantry Division Insignia

== See also ==
- List of Korean War Medal of Honor recipients
- Womack Army Medical Center - Named after Private Womack in 1958.
