= Travis Atkins =

United States Army Medal of Honor recipient

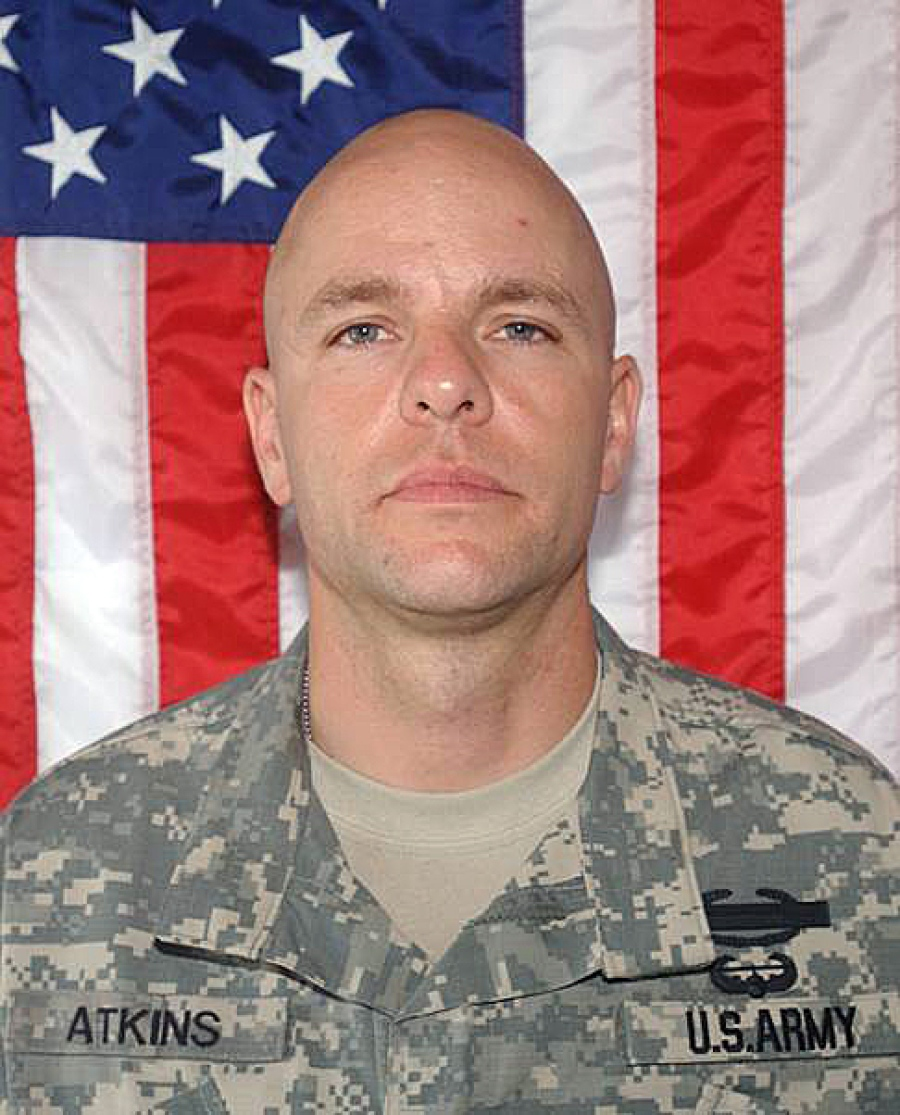
- Born: December 9, 1975; Great Falls, Montana, United States
- Died: June 1, 2007 (aged 31); Yusufiyah, Iraq
- Burial place: Sunset Hills Cemetery, Bozeman, Montana
- Military career
- Allegiance: United States
- Branch: United States Army
- Service years: 2000–2003; 2005–2007
- Rank: Staff Sergeant
- Units: 2nd Infantry Brigade Combat Team, 10th Mountain Division; 1st Infantry Brigade Combat Team, 101st Airborne Division
- Conflicts: Iraq War †
- Awards: Medal of Honor; Bronze Star; Purple Heart; Army Commendation Medal (2); Army Achievement Medal

Travis William Atkins (December 9, 1975 – June 1, 2007) was a soldier in the United States Army. President Donald Trump awarded him the Medal of Honor posthumously on March 27, 2019. While serving with the 2nd Infantry Brigade Combat Team of the 10th Mountain Division in Iraq, he sacrificed his own life to shield three fellow soldiers from an insurgent who was wearing and activated an explosive vest.

== Distinguished Service Cross citation ==
Atkins was originally awarded the Distinguished Service Cross for his actions. The accompanying citation reads:

The President of the United States of America, authorized by Act of Congress, July 9, 1918 (amended by act of July 25, 1963), takes pride in presenting the Distinguished Service Cross (Posthumously) to Staff Sergeant Travis W. Atkins, United States Army, for extraordinary heroism in connection with military operations against an armed enemy while serving with Company D, 2nd Battalion, 14th Infantry Regiment, 2nd Brigade Combat Team, 10th Mountain Division, on 1 June 2007. Staff Sergeant Atkins distinguished himself by conspicuous gallantry at the cost of his life in support of Operation IRAQI FREEDOM. While conducting route security in the town of Abu Sarnak, Iraq, Staff Sergeant Atkins apprehended and began to search a group of suspected insurgents. However, one insurgent resisted and engaged Staff Sergeant Atkins in hand-to-hand combat. As Staff Sergeant Atkins attempted to subdue the man, he realized the insurgent was attempting to trigger a suicide vest which he wore under his clothing. Despite Staff Sergeant Atkins' efforts, the insurgent finally succeeded in reaching his vest. Staff Sergeant Atkins selflessly tackled the suicide bomber in a bear hug, pinning him to the ground and shielding his Soldiers from the imminent explosion. In this critical and selfless act of valor in which he was mortally wounded, Staff Sergeant Atkins saved the lives of three other Soldiers who were with him and gallantly gave his life for his country. Staff Sergeant Atkins' undaunted courage, warrior spirit and steadfast devotion to duty reflect great credit upon himself, the 2d Brigade Combat Team, and the United States Army.

== Medal of Honor award ceremony and citation ==
His son Trevor accepted the award From President Donald Trump, along with his sister Jennifer, his mom, and grandparents. Also in attendance were the Vice-president, the Chairman of the Joint Chiefs, and the Secretary of the Army, as well as five previous living recipients of the award, and numerous distinguished members of the military. Witnesses to the award also included the three men whose lives Atkins saved in his selfless act.

The president said of Atkins, “He did not run. He didn't know what it was to run. He acted in the tradition of the 10th Mountain Division in his 'climb to glory.'”

The President of the United States has awarded, in the name of Congress, the Medal of Honor (Posthumously) to Staff Sergeant Travis W. Atkins, United States Army. Staff Sergeant Atkins distinguished himself by conspicuous acts of gallantry and intrepidity at the risk of his life above and beyond the call of duty on 1 June 2007, while serving as a Squad Leader with Delta Company, 2nd Battalion, 14th Infantry Regiment, 2nd Brigade Combat Team, 10th Mountain Division, in support of Operation Iraqi Freedom. While manning a static observation post in the town of Abu Samak, Iraq, Staff Sergeant Atkins was notified that four suspicious individuals, walking in two pairs, were crossing an intersection not far from his position. Staff Sergeant Atkins immediately moved his squad to interdict them. One of the individuals began behaving erratically, prompting Staff Sergeant Atkins to disembark from his patrol vehicle and approach to conduct a search. Both individuals responded belligerently toward Staff Sergeant Atkins, who then engaged the individual he had intended to search in hand-to-hand combat. When he noticed the insurgent was reaching for something under his clothes, Staff Sergeant Atkins immediately wrapped him in a bear hug and threw him to the ground, away from his fellow soldiers. Maintaining his hold on the insurgent, he pinned him to the ground, further sheltering his patrol. The insurgent then detonated a bomb strapped to his body, killing Staff Sergeant Atkins. In this critical and selfless act of valor, Staff Sergeant Atkins acted with complete disregard for his own safety, saving the lives of the three soldiers who were with him and gallantly giving his life for his country. Staff Sergeant Atkins's undaunted courage, warrior spirit, and steadfast devotion to duty are in keeping with the highest traditions of military service and reflect great credit upon himself, the 2nd Brigade Combat Team, and the United States Army.

== Awards and decorations ==
President Donald J. Trump posthumously awards the Medal of Honor during a White House ceremony to the son of Army Staff Sgt. Travis W. Atkins for his father’s heroic 2007 actions in Iraq, March 27, 2019.

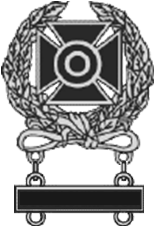
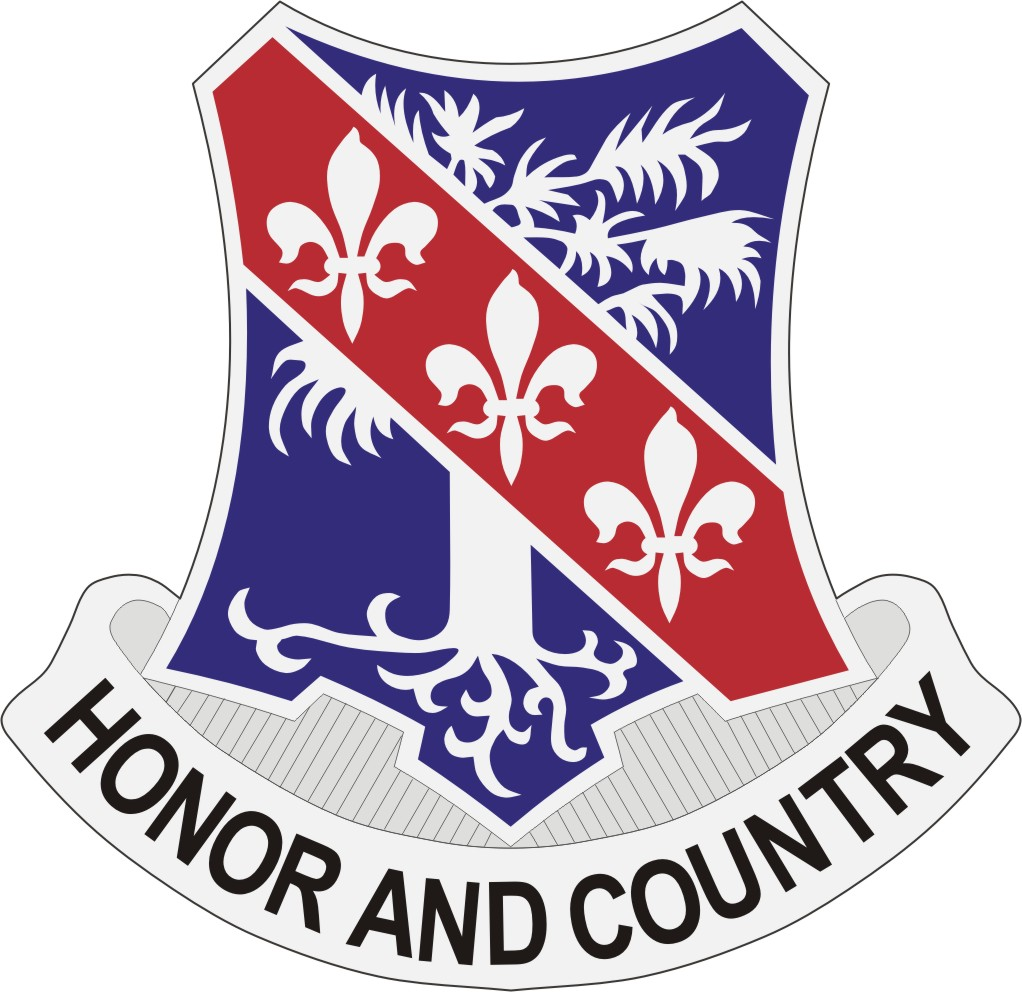
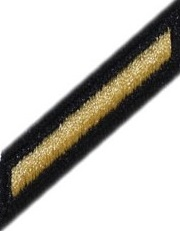
Combat Infantryman Badge
Air Assault Badge with 3rd Battalion, 327th Infantry Regiment background trimming
Expert Marksmanship Badge with one weapon clasp
10th Mountain Division Shoulder Sleeve Insignia
327th Infantry Regiment Distinctive Unit Insignia
1 Service stripe
1 Overseas Service Bar

Medal of Honor
Bronze Star Medal
Purple Heart
Army Commendation Medal with one bronze oak leaf cluster
Army Achievement Medal
Valorous Unit Award with oak leaf cluster
Army Meritorious Unit Commendation
Army Good Conduct Medal
National Defense Service Medal
Iraq Campaign Medal with four bronze service stars
Global War on Terrorism Service Medal
NCO Professional Development Ribbon
Army Service Ribbon
Army Overseas Service Ribbon with bronze award numeral 2

== Legacy ==
In June 2012, the ceremony room at the Military Entrance Processing Station in Butte, Montana was named in honor of Atkins. In January 2013, the Mountain Functional Fitness Facility at Fort Drum in the state of New York was renamed in his honor.

== See also ==
- List of post-Vietnam War Medal of Honor recipients
