= RSAC =

RSAC may refer to:

- Reliance Steel & Aluminum Company, a Fortune 500 company - a commercial provider of metals and related services
- Rand Strategy Assessment Center, a branch of the Rand Corporation “think tank”
- Recreational Software Advisory Council, a non-profit organization formed to rate the content of computer games
- Remote Sensing Applications Center, a software development facility of the United States Forest Service
- Royal Scottish Automobile Club, a member of the Alliance Internationale de Tourisme
- RSA Conference, a series of computer data security conferences and the organization running them
- RsaC, a gene expression-pattern in Rsa RNA
- RSAC Software, developers of GEDitCOM genealogy software
