= Operation Pathways =

United States Army Pacific program

Operation Pathways, formerly known as Pacific Pathways, is a program run by United States Army Pacific (USARPAC) and carried out by I Corps with the goal of expanding the Army's engagement in the Pacific region and reducing costs. It involves linking multiple military exercises together to create a "Pathway". The concept of the program was first created by General Vincent K. Brooks in 2014. Previous Pathways have included exercises in Australia, Fiji, Indonesia, Japan, Malaysia, Mongolia, Palau, the Philippines, South Korea, Thailand, and the United States.

== History ==
=== 2014 ===
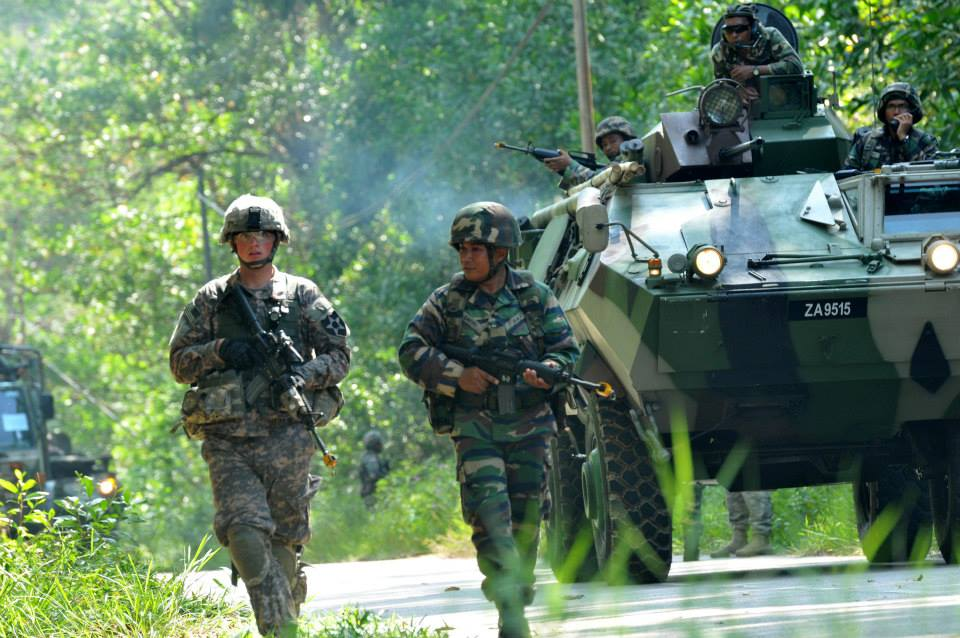
American and Malaysian Soldiers conduct patrols at Keris Strike 14

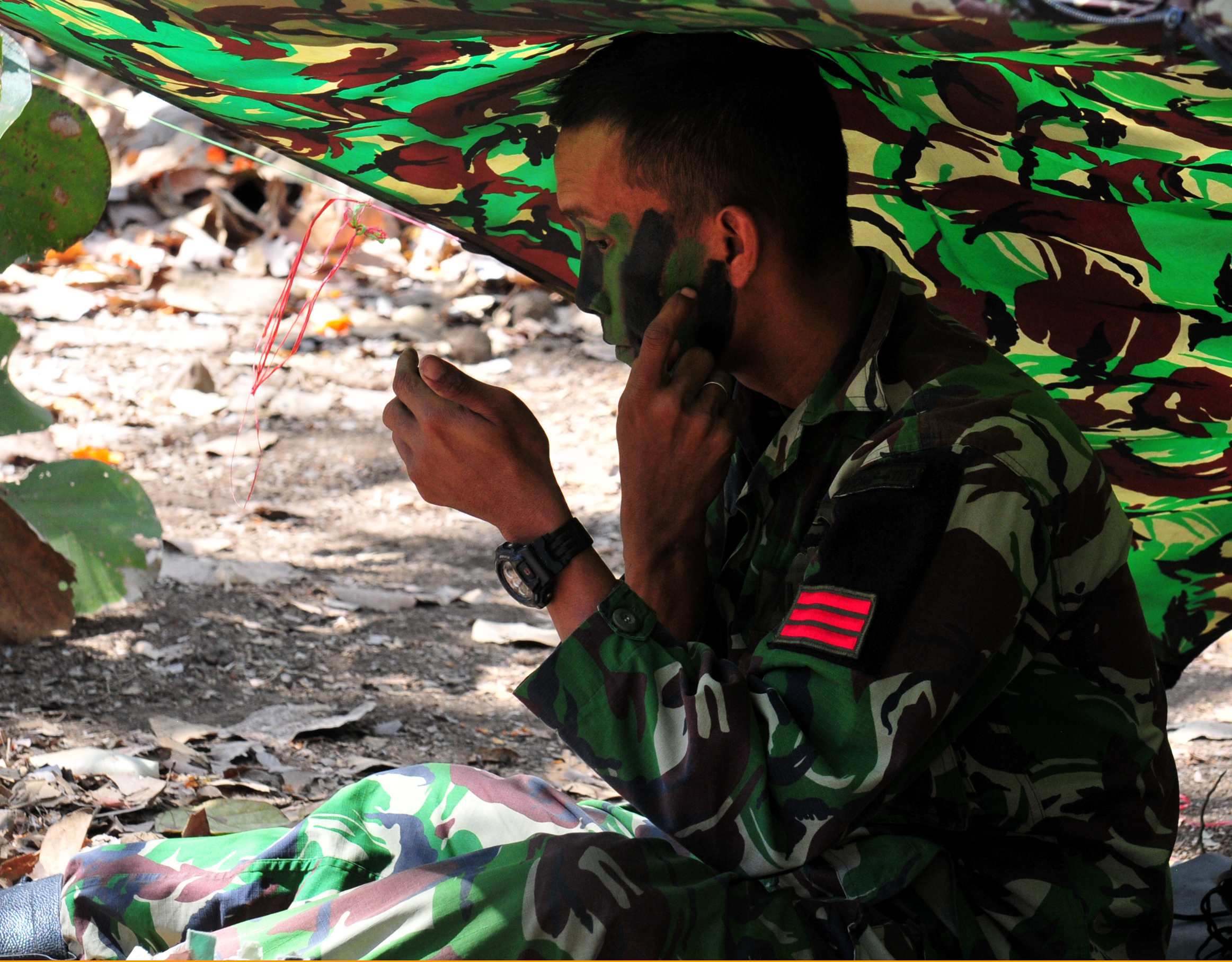
Indonesian soldier applies camouflage paint to his face during Garuda Shield 14

From August to November, one Pathway was completed as a proof of concept. About 820 personnel from the 2-2 Stryker Brigade Combat Team were sent to complete three exercises, including Keris Strike in Malaysia, Garuda Shield in Indonesia, and Orient Shield in Japan.

=== 2015 ===
In 2015, three Pathways were completed, numbered 15–1, 15–2, and 15–3.

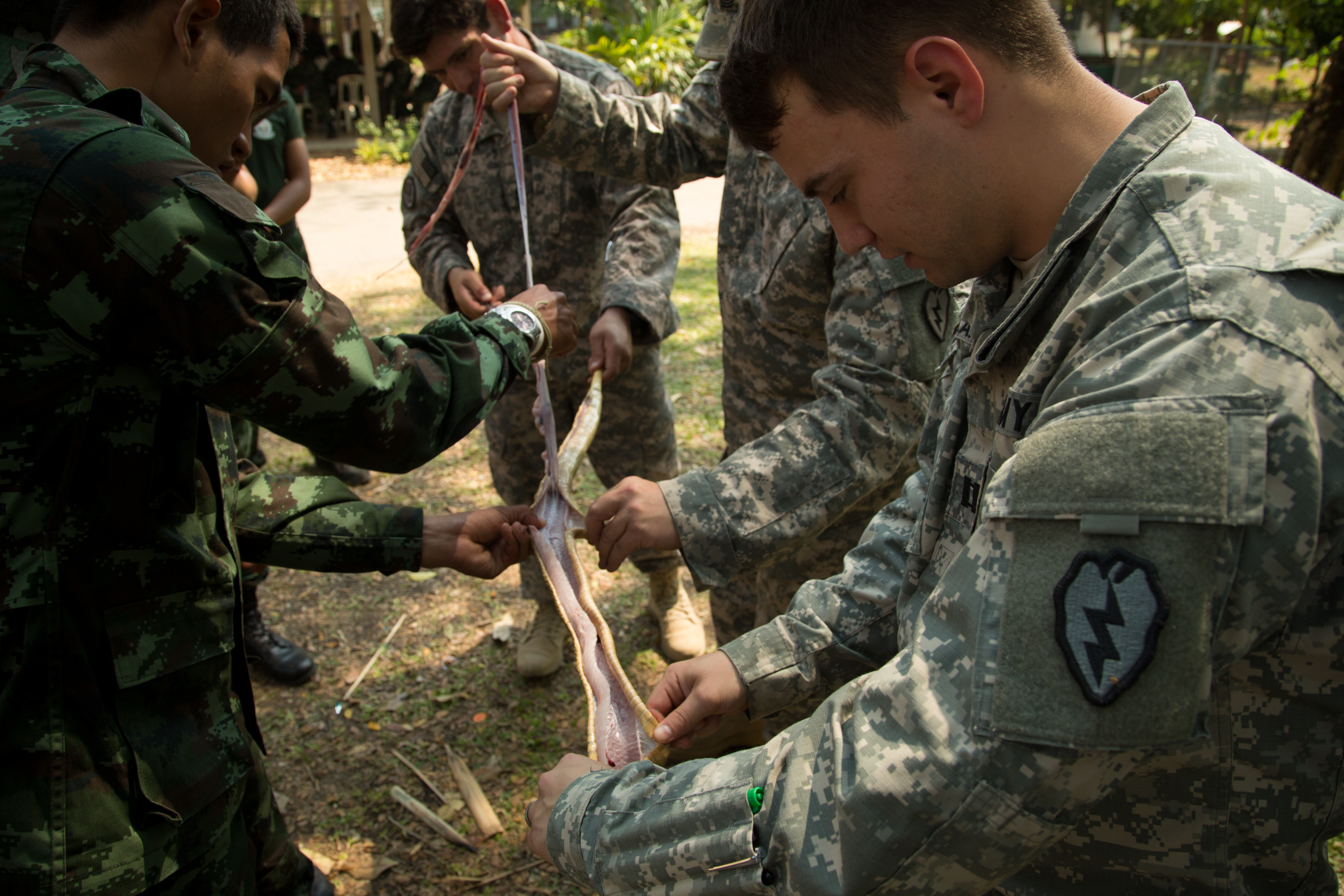
Thai soldiers demonstrate how to properly handle and neutralize a king cobra to American soldiers during Cobra Gold 15

From January to May, about 880 personnel from the 2-25 Stryker Brigade Combat Team completed three exercises for Pathway 15–1, including Cobra Gold in Thailand, Foal Eagle in South Korea, and Balikatan in the Philippines.

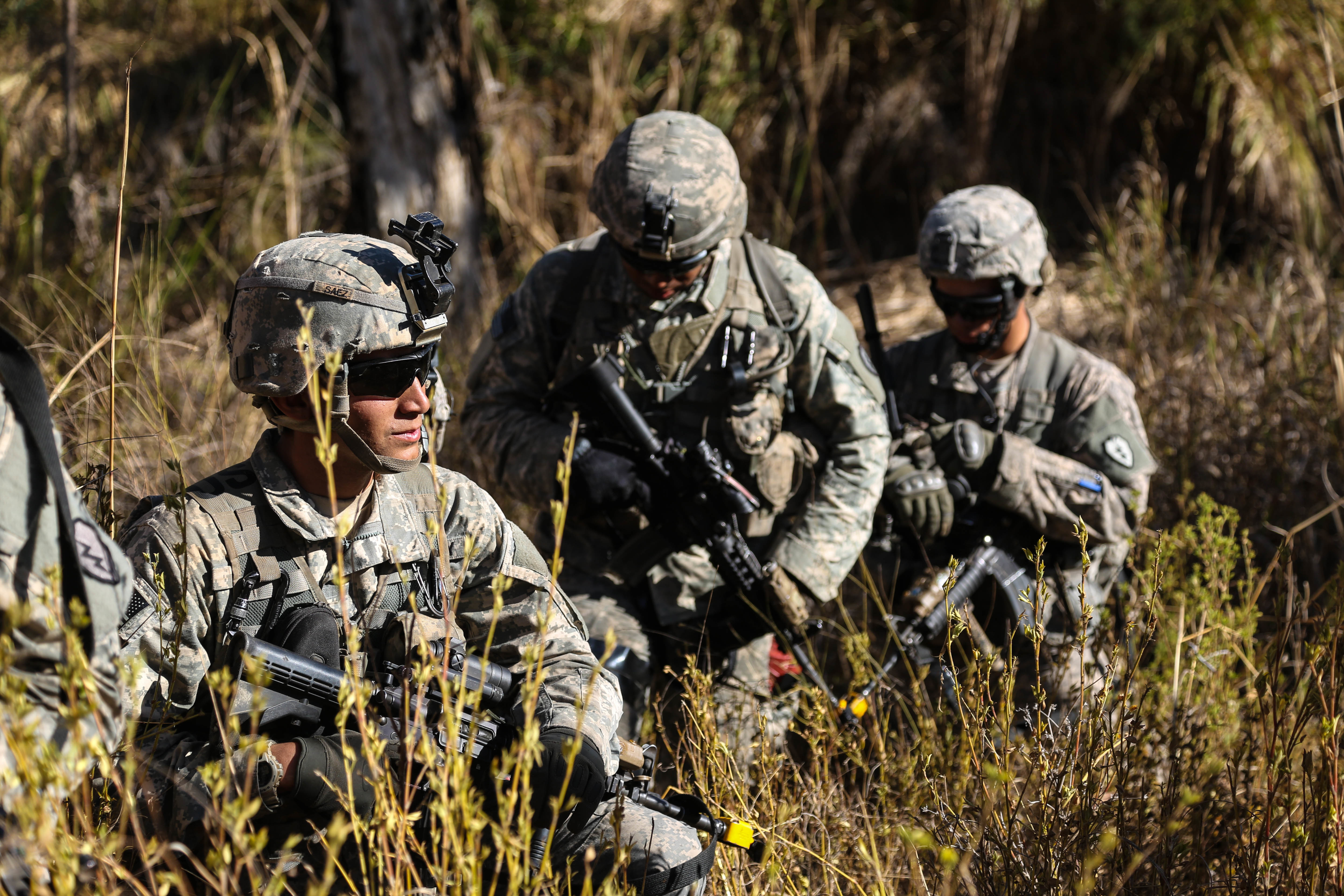
U.S. soldiers patrol the woods during Pacific Pathway 15-2

From June to October, the 3-25 Stryker Brigade Combat Team sent about 840 personnel to complete three exercises, including Hamel in Australia, Garuda Shield in Indonesia, and Keris Strike in Malaysia. Garuda Shield and Keris Strike were also completed in 2014.

In June and July, about 420 personnel from the 1-25 Stryker Brigade Combat Team completed three exercises for Pathway 15–3, including Khan Quest in Mongolia, Orient Shield in Japan, and Hoguk in South Korea.

=== 2016 ===
In 2016, Pathways 16–1, 16–2, and 16-3 were completed to increase Army readiness, increase Joint and interagency access and expand regional ally and partner collaboration and interoperability.

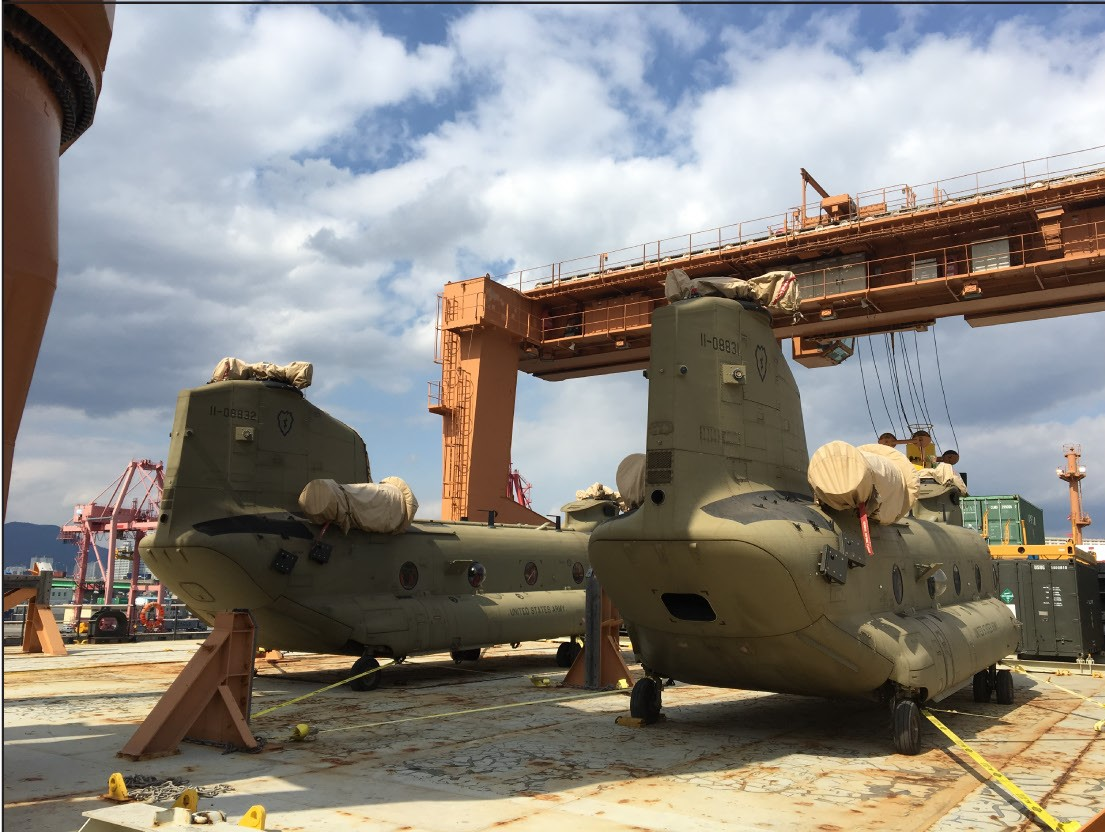
Helicopters Loaded on Vessel During Pacific Pathway 16-1

From December 2015 to May 2016, about 835 personnel from the 1-2 Stryker Brigade Combat Team completed three exercises, including the Cobra Gold exercise in Thailand, the Foal Eagle exercise in South Korea, and the Balikatan exercise in the Philippines.

During the months of May to September, about 700 personnel from the 2-2 Stryker Brigade Combat Team completed four different exercises, including the Hanuman Guardian exercise in Thailand, the Salaknib exercise in the Philippines, the Garuda Shield exercise in Indonesia, and the Keris Strike exercise in Malaysia.

From July to September, four exercises were completed, including the Tiger Balm exercise in Hawaii, United States, the Arctic Anvil exercise in Alaska, United States, the Orient Shield exercise in Japan, and the Rising Thunder exercise in Washington, United States. Tiger Balm, Arctic Anvil, and Rising Thunder were "Reverse Pathways," meaning that instead of the U.S. Army traveling abroad, the Singapore Army, Canadian Army, and the Japan Ground Self-Defense Force visited the United States.

=== 2017 ===
In 2017, three Pathways (17–1, 17–2, and 17–3) were completed.

From February to May, three exercises were repeated from Pathways 15-1 and 16–1, including the Cobra Gold exercise in Thailand, the Foal Eagle exercise in South Korea, and the Balikatan exercise in the Philippines.

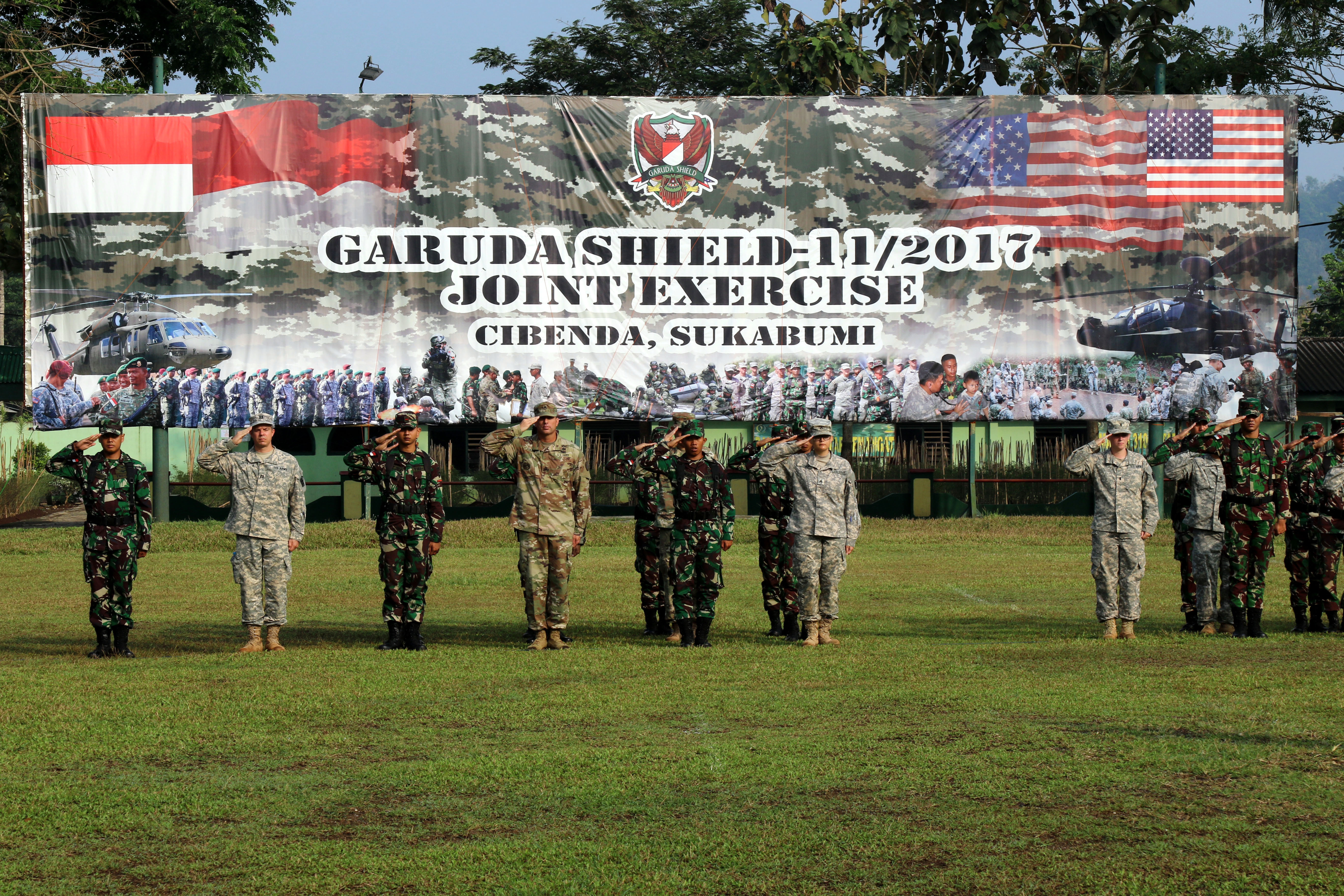
U.S. and Indonesian soldiers saluting during the closing ceremony of Garuda Shield 2017

During the months of July to September, three exercises were completed, including the Tiger Balm exercise in Singapore, the Keris Strike exercise in Malaysia, and the Garuda Shield exercise in Indonesia.

From July to September, four exercises were completed, including the Talisman Saber exercise in Australia, the Hanuman Guardian exercise in Thailand, the Orient Shield exercise in Japan, and the Rising Thunder exercise in Washington, United States (Reverse Pathway).

=== 2018 ===
Three Pathways were completed during the year of 2018. They were Pathways 18–1, 18–2, and 18–3.

Between February and May, three exercises were completed, including the Cobra Gold exercise in Thailand, the Key Resolve exercise in the Republic of Korea, and the Balikatan exercise in the Philippines.

From June to September, five exercises were completed, including the Hamel exercise in Australia, the Garuda Shield exercise in Indonesia, the Orient Shield exercise in Japan, the Keris Strike exercise in Malaysia, and the Hanuman Guardian exercise in Thailand. This Pacific Pathway was the first Army National Guard-led Pathway, conducted by the 76th IBCT from the Indiana Army National Guard, the 96th Troop Command from the Washington Army National Guard, and the 116th CBCT from the Idaho National Guard.

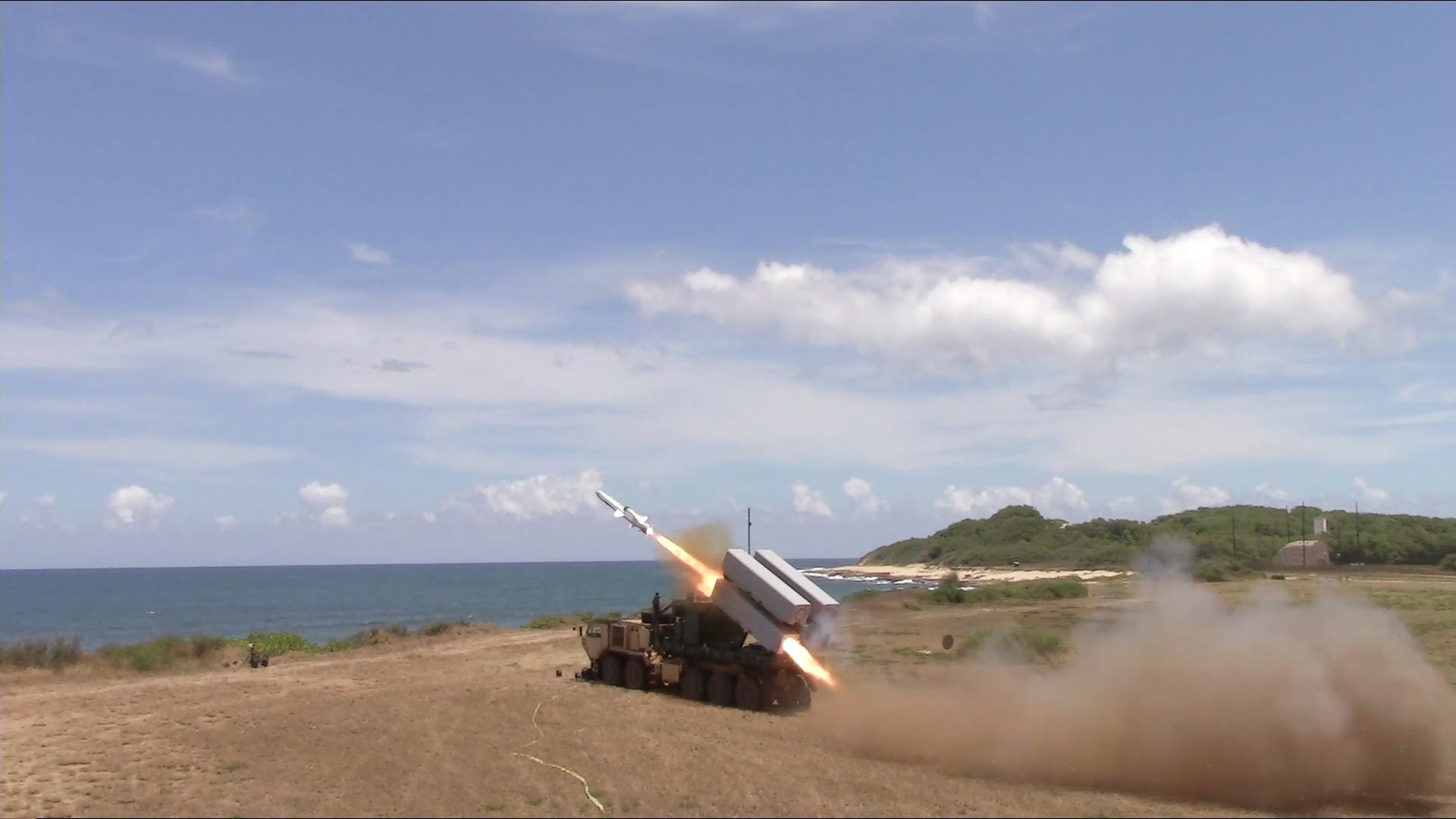
First land-based missile launch performed at RIMPAC exercise

From May to September, four exercises were completed, including the Tiger Balm exercise in Hawaii, United States (Reverse Pathway with the Singapore Army), the RIMPAC (Rim of the Pacific) exercise in Hawaii, United States, the Valiant Shield exercise in Guam, and the Rising Thunder exercise in Washington, United States (Reverse Pathway with the Japan Ground Self-Defense Force). Two of these exercises were Reverse Pathways, and the other two were traditionally naval exercises that the United States Army joined in through the Multi-Domain Task Force (or MDTF) led by 17FAB as a part of the Army's pilot program for multi-domain operations.

=== 2019 ===
Three Pathways were completed in 2019 to include an extended presence Pathway, an MDTF Pathway, and a total force Pathway.

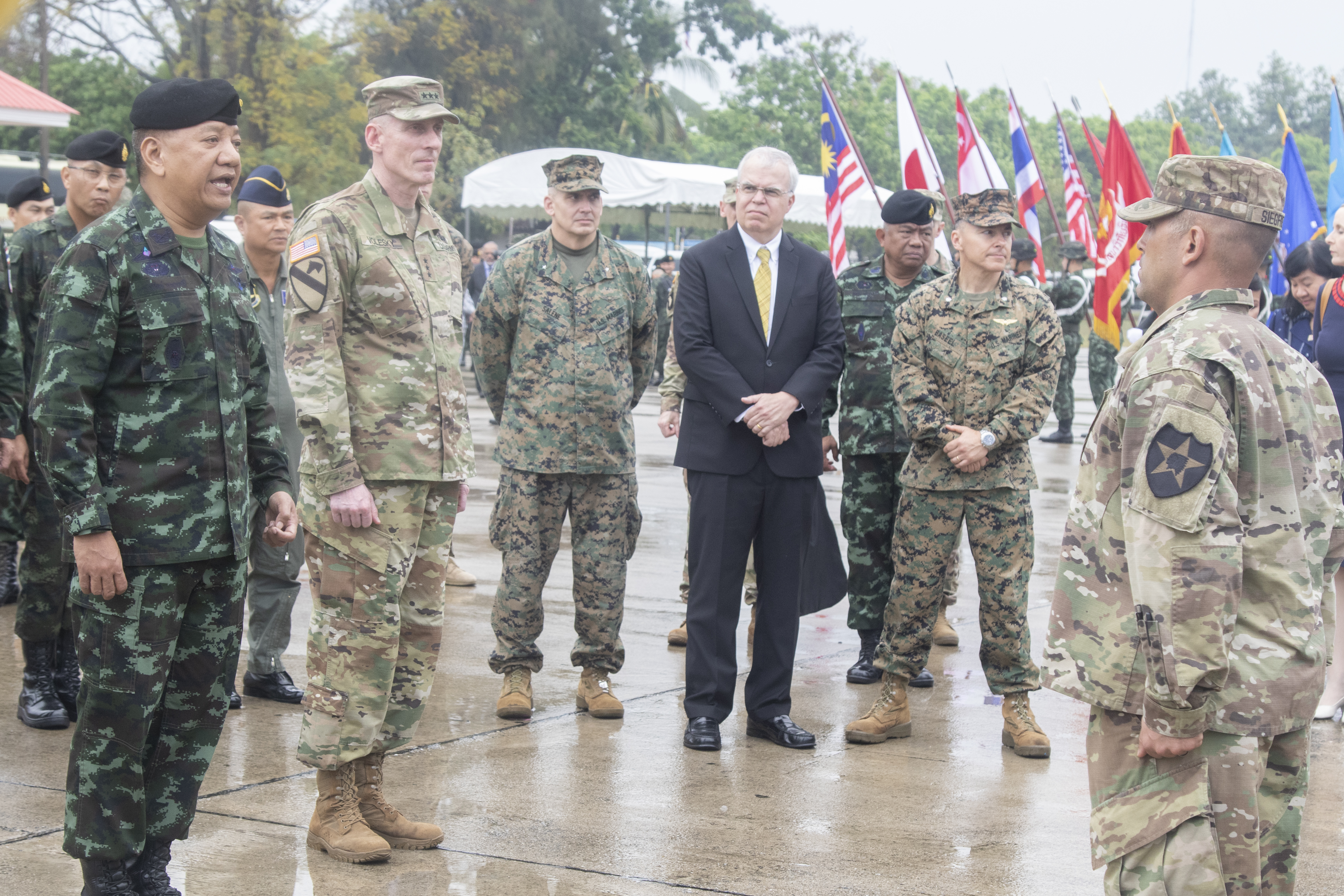
General Pornpipat Benyasri and Lt. Gen. Gary Volesky greet Lt. Col. Scott Siegfried during the opening ceremony of Cobra Gold 19

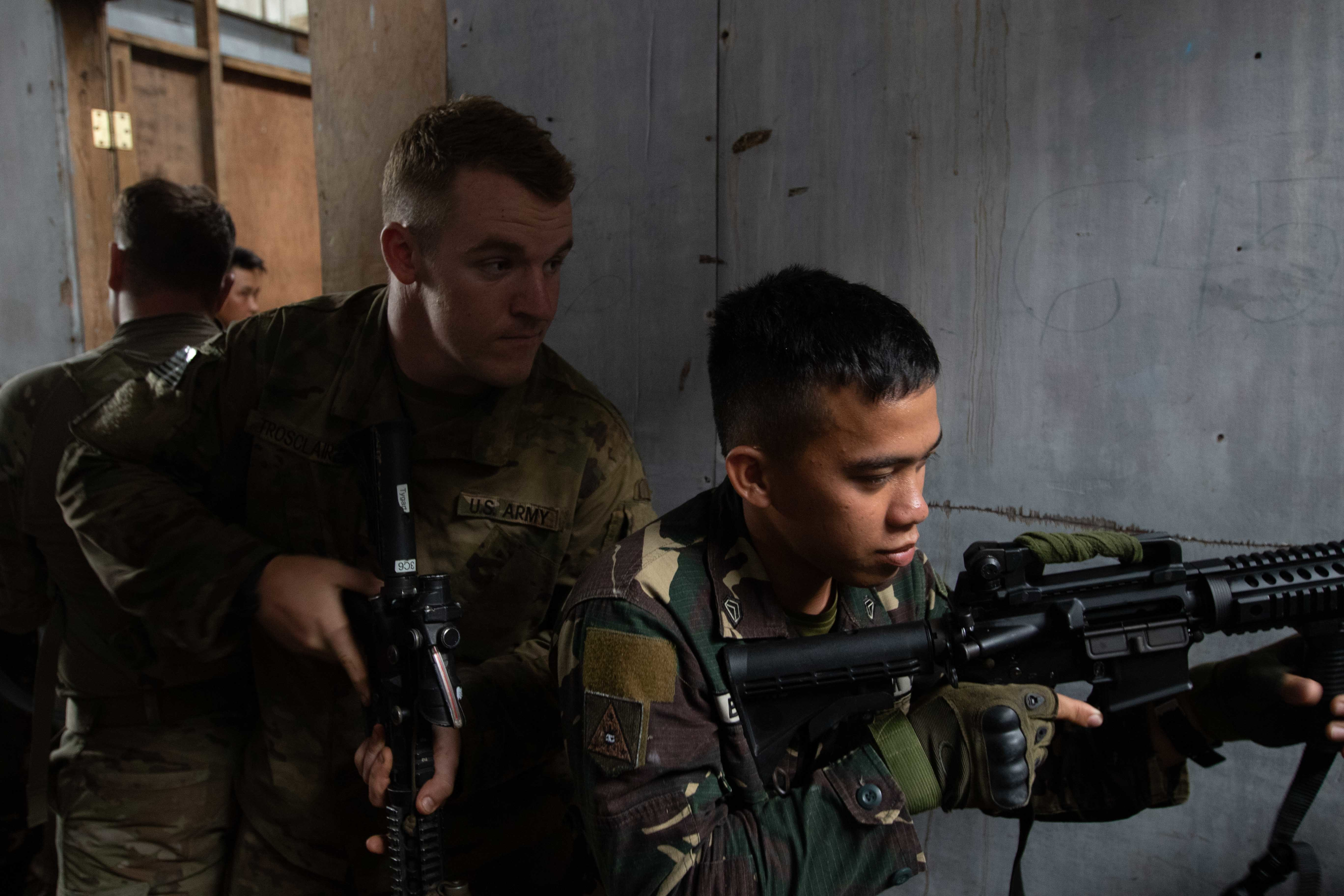
U.S. and Philippine Service Members train side-by-side during Salaknib 2019

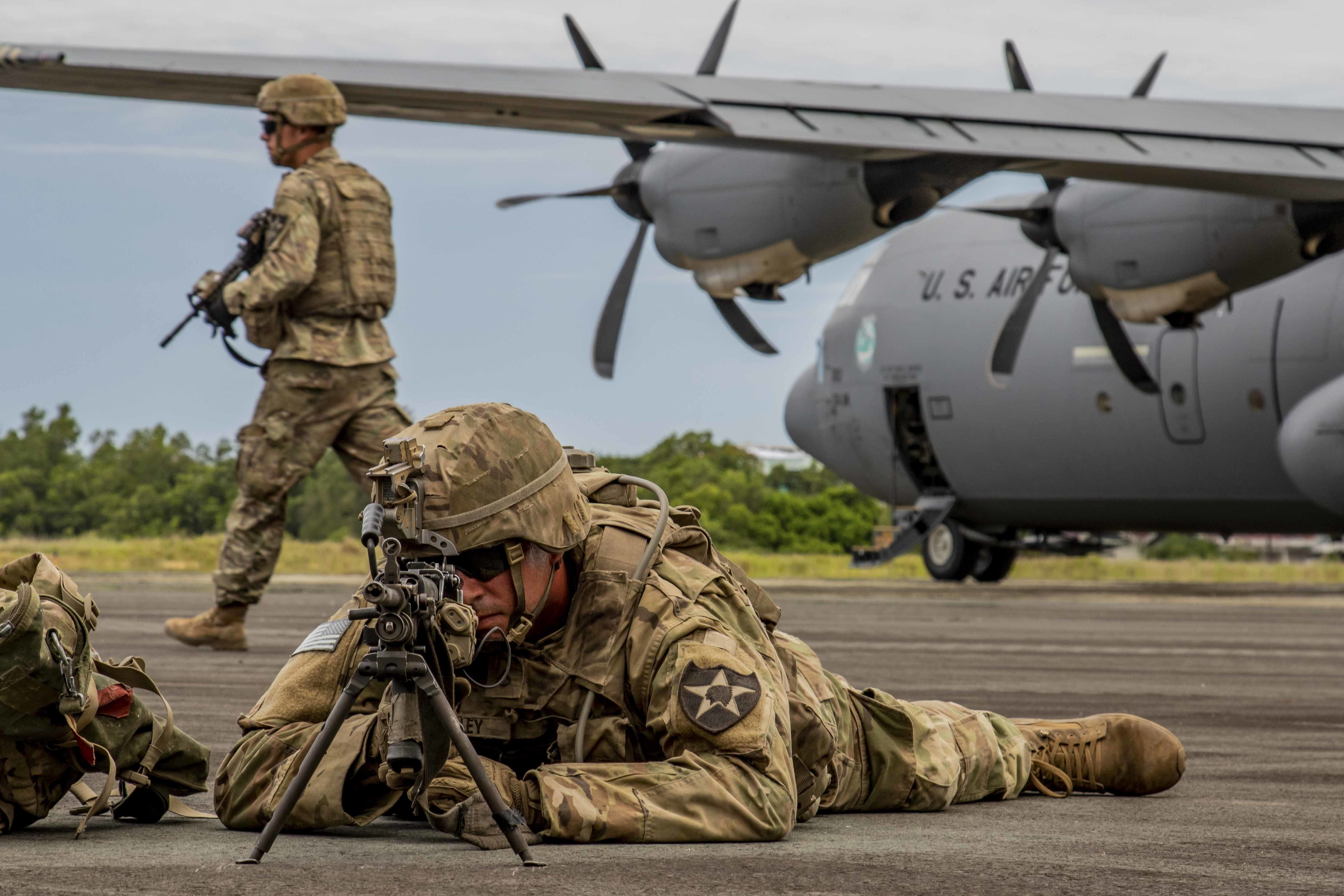
Soldiers from 5-20 Infantry conduct combined security mission at the Palau Intl. Airport

From January to May, five exercises were completed, including the Hanuman Guardian exercise in Thailand, the Cobra Gold exercise in Thailand, the Salaknib exercise in the Philippines, the Balikatan exercise in the Philippines, and the Palau exercise in Palau.

The 19-1 Pathway was the first extended presence in a priority nation, with four months in the Philippines. 19-1 also was the first dynamic force employment of the Pathways task force with a "spoke" to Palau from the Philippines. Pathway forces for 19-1 were provided by 25ID, 1-2SBCT, and 25CAB.

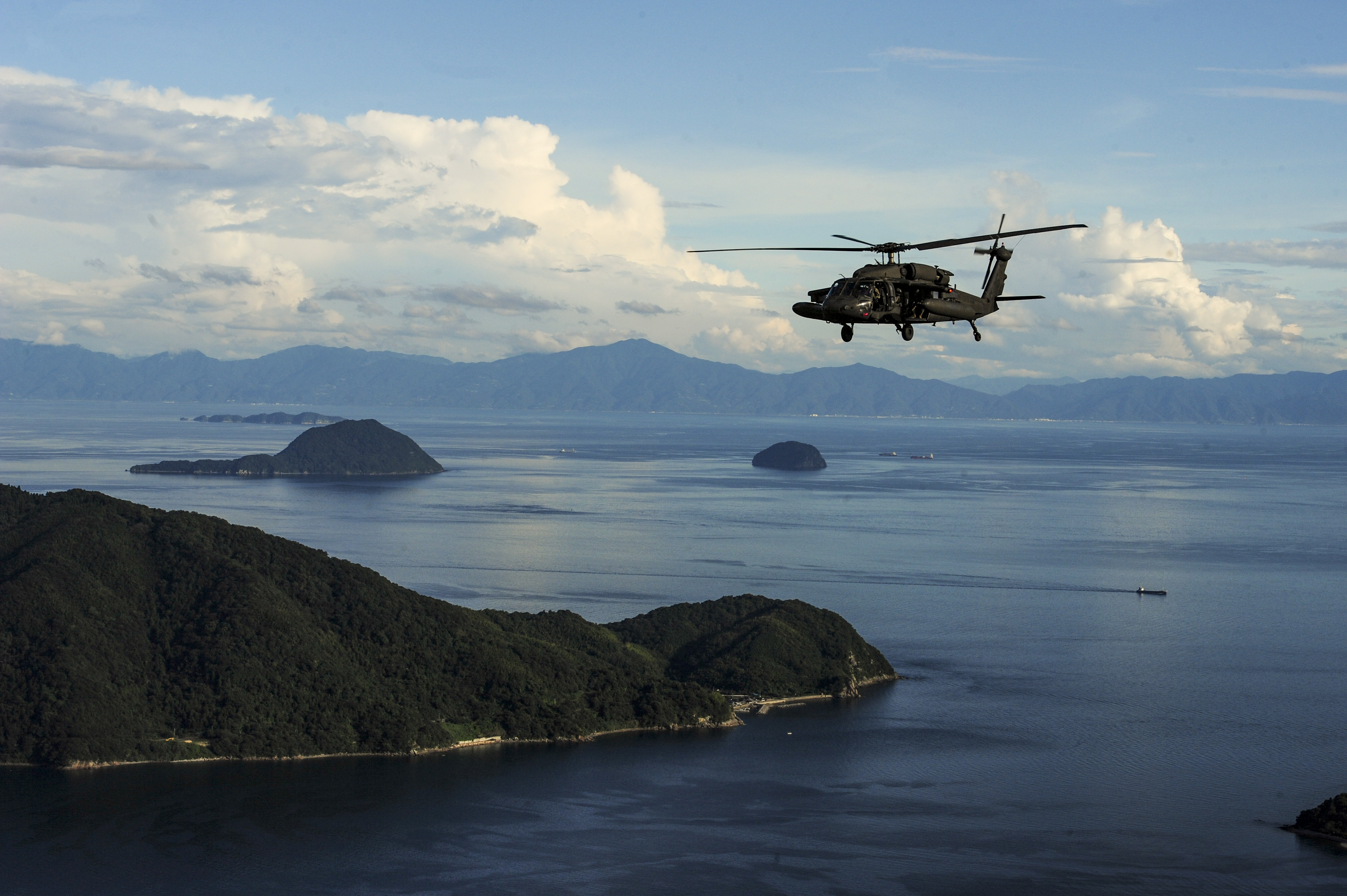
A US Army UH-60 Blackhawk flies over Yamaguchi Bay during Orient Shield 2019

19-2 consisted of two exercises from July to September focused on the multi-domain task force led by 2 ID DIVARTY and 17 FAB. The exercises in 19-2 were the Talisman Saber exercise in Australia, which was officially launched on July 8, 2019, on board the USS Ronald Reagan (A Chinese Type 815G spy ship also watched over the exercise, seeming to gather information about the interactions between the participating militaries.) and the Orient Shield exercise in Japan.

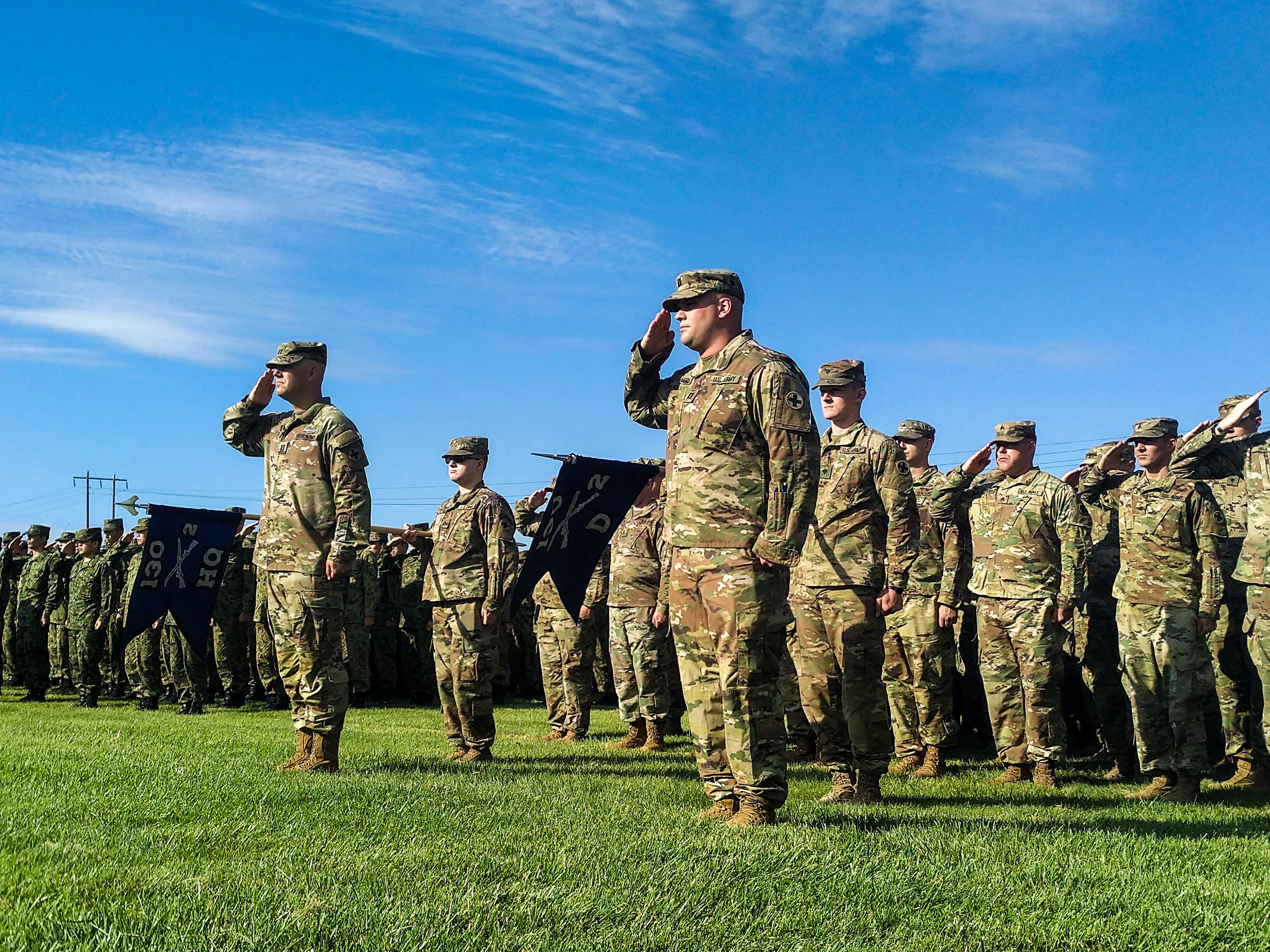
Illinois Guardsmen prepare for international partnership at Rising Thunder

19-3 consisted of the Hamel exercise in Australia, a dynamic force employment to Fiji, the Garuda Shield exercise in Indonesia, the Tiger Bomb/Lightning Strike exercise in Singapore, and the Rising Thunder exercise in Washington, United States (Reverse Pathway with the Japan Ground Self-Defense Force)

Forces for Pathway 19-3 were provided by 2-25IBCT, 16CAB, and 33IBCT from ILARNG.

== Pacific Pathways 2.0 ==
In October 2018, General Robert Brooks Brown announced changes to the Pacific Pathways program to utilize the Pathways to compete with rivals in the Indo-Pacific area by spending longer time periods in priority nations to build deeper relationships. This design will mean that units will be in hubs in treaty nations for 4–6 months, and will be positioned west of the international date line. The Pathways forces will be able to also provide options to the INDOPACOM commander to assist partner nations in times of need or if needed to transition from competition to conflict.
