= Orient Shield exercise =

Japanese–US military training exercise

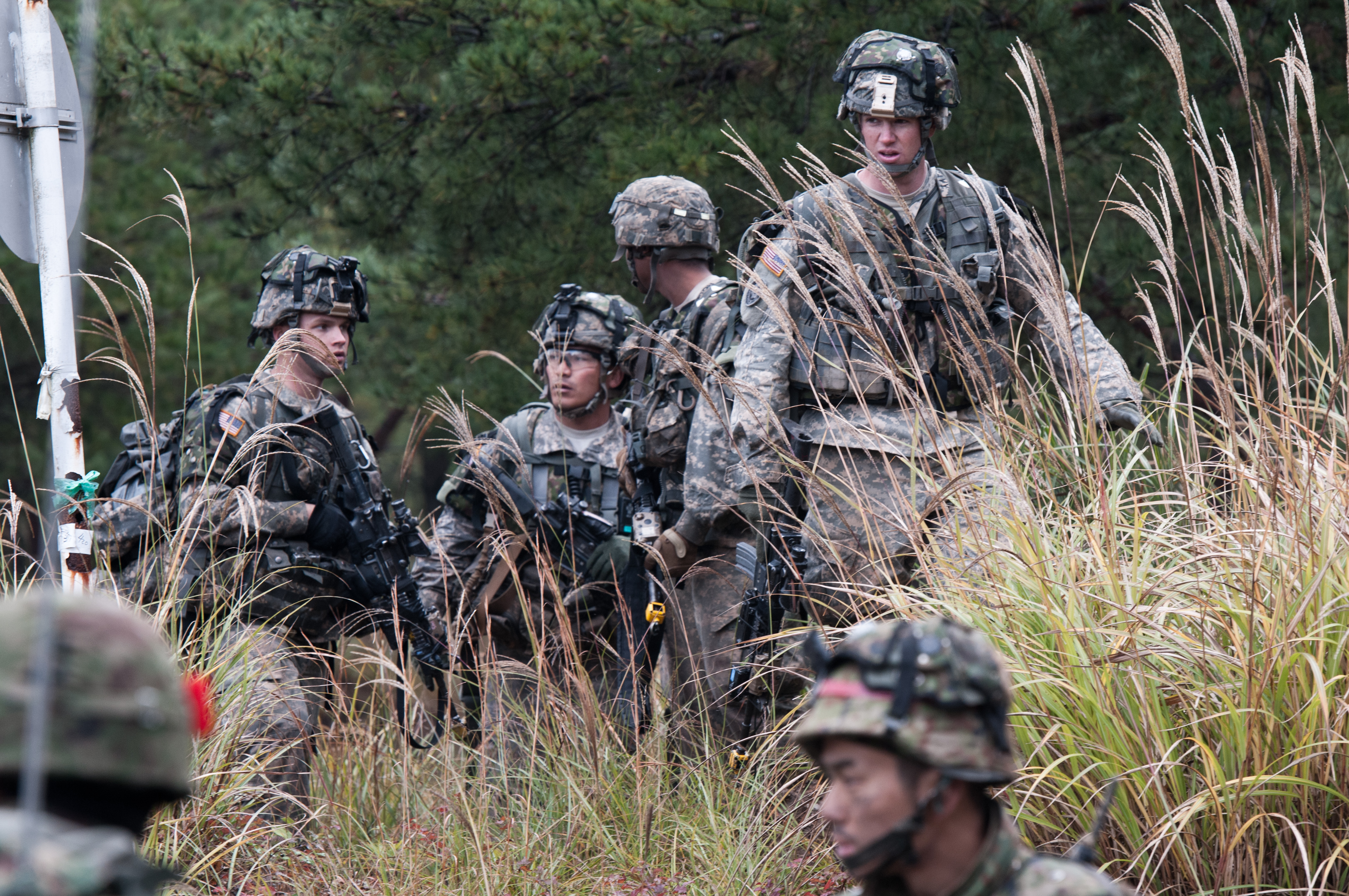
Soldiers of the 1st Battalion, 14th Infantry Regiment, 2nd Stryker Brigade Combat Team and soldiers of the Japanese Ground Self Defense Force participating in Orient Shield 2012, pictured on 31 October 2012.

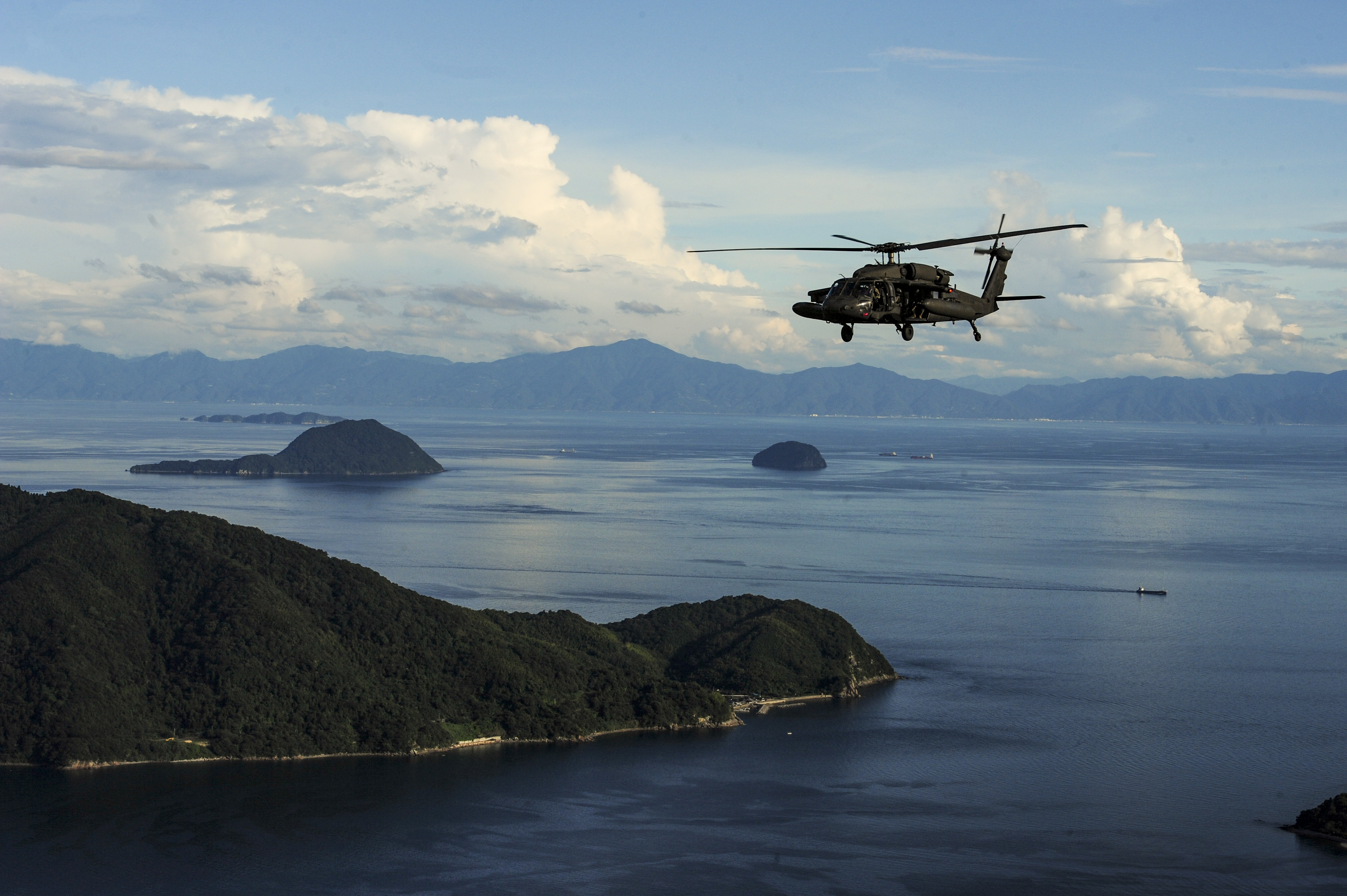
A US Army UH-60 Blackhawk flies over Yamaguchi Bay during Orient Shield 2019

Orient Shield is an annual training exercise executed in Japan between the Japanese Ground Self Defense Forces (JGSDF) and United States Army. Since 1985, it has focused on development and refinement of systems and tactics in order to enhance bilateral tactical planning, coordination, and interoperability. The exercise is designed to enhance bilateral combat effectiveness at the battalion and brigade levels while strengthening military-to-military relationships and demonstrating American commitment to support regional security interests. Rotating between JGSDF divisions of the five Regional Armies, Orient Shield leverages the unique capabilities of the training units to provide for ever-increasing tactical complexity and realism. The ongoing tension around North Korea's nuclear program has added an additional layer of importance to the annual exercise.

Originally executed as a one week platoon-level Field Training Exercise (FTX), Orient Shield has evolved into a two week battalion-level FTX, brigade-level computer assisted Command Post Exercise (CPX), and company-level Combined Arms Live Fire Exercise (CALFEX). Orient Shield is now the largest Japanese and American bilateral FTX.

In 2015, Orient Shield was added to Pacific Pathways, a United States Army Pacific (USARPAC) initiative to improve readiness and the scope and quality of regional engagements. In 2018, the 40th Infantry Division from California National Guard and 76th Infantry Brigade Combat Team (IBCT) from the Indiana National Guard became the first Total Force partners to participate in the exercise.

In 2025, the Australian Army was invited, participating in the exercise for the first time with 200 troops composed of soldiers drawn largely from the 1st Battalion, and the 2nd Health Brigade taking part in the opening ceremony on September 16. In 2026, the exercise again involved Australia and reached its largest level with 3,700 participating personnel across three countries. The exercise also involved the Typhon missile system, which elicited criticism from Russia.

== Participants ==
Orient Shield participants
Year	Japanese partner	US partner	Location
2014	7th DIV, Northern Army	2nd SBCT, 2ID	Yasubetsu Training Area
2015	6th DIV, Northeastern Army	1st SBCT, 25th ID	Ojojihara Training Area
2016	3rd DIV, Middle Army	3rd IBCT, 25th ID	Camp Aibano
2017	1st DIV, Eastern Army	1st SBCT, 25th ID	CATC Fuji
2018	9th DIV, Northeastern Army	76th IBCT, 40th ID	Ojojihara Training Area

== See also ==
- Exercise Kangaroo
- Exercise Talisman Saber
- Vostok 2010
- Vostok 2018
