= Remote Sensing Applications Center =

Sensing facility in the U.S

The Remote Sensing Applications Center (RSAC) is a facility of the United States Forest Service (USFS). It receives weather and fire-monitoring data remotely-sensed by satellites, and converts it into maps and reports for the USFS.

== Location and purpose ==
The RSAC is a software development organization, housed at the same location as its corresponding operational organization, the USFS Geospatial Technology and Applications Center (GTAC), in Salt Lake City, Utah. The RSAC and GTAC assist USFS field operations with combined data from fire-monitoring and weather satellites and other remotely-sensed data, along with mapping and geological surveys (“geospatial technology”).

The RSAC's principal goal is to develop and implement less costly ways for the Forest Service to obtain information it needs to manage wildfires, water, and forest resources.
