= Cobra Gold =

Yearly multinational military exercise held in Thailand

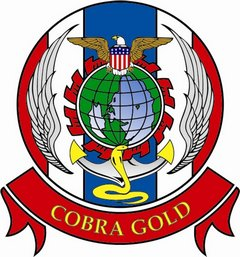
- Coat of arms
- Headquarters: Bangkok, Thailand
- Type: Military exercises
- Members: 7 Countries: Indonesia; Japan; Malaysia; Singapore; South Korea; Thailand; United States; 10 Observers: Cambodia; Israel; Laos; Brunei; Pakistan; Sweden; Germany; Sri Lanka; Brazil; Vietnam
- Establishment: 1982
- Website; Facebook Instagram

Cobra Gold (Thai: คอบร้าโกลด์) refers to multi-national Indo-Pacific military exercises held in Thailand. They are among the largest annual exercises of their kind.

== Overview ==
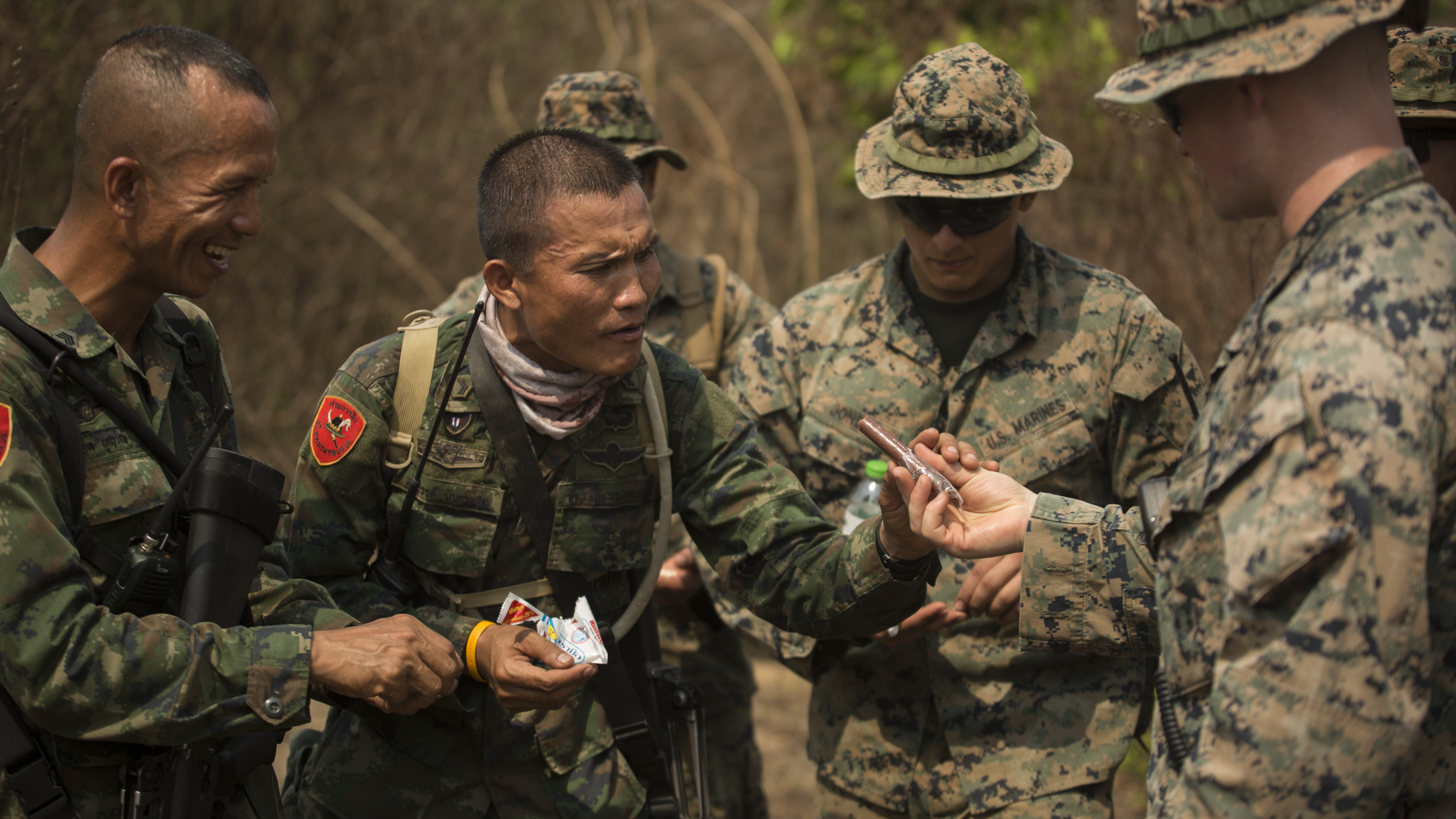
Royal Thai and U.S. military training together during Cobra Gold 2020

Cobra Gold was first held in 1982 in an effort to improve coordination between the armed forces of the United States and Thailand in both hostile military and humanitarian efforts.

As of 2021, Cobra Gold has several different activities that highlight regional security and effective regional crisis responses. The first is the Combined Arms Live-Fire Exercise (CALFEX), in which live ammunition is aimed at predetermined targets as troops advance and close in on their target. A Command Post Exercise (CPX) is when military officers engage in computerized war games, disaster relief, or humanitarian missions over several days. An Amphibious Exercise (AMPHIBEX) combines ship-to-shore movement capabilities, with vertical envelopment between the Royal Thai Armed Forces and U.S. military, with allied forces dependent on operational developments.

In 2020, Cobra Gold introduced landmine reduction operation and introduced U.S. Marine Corps F-35B Lightning II fighter aircraft and the high mobility artillery rocket system (HIMARS).

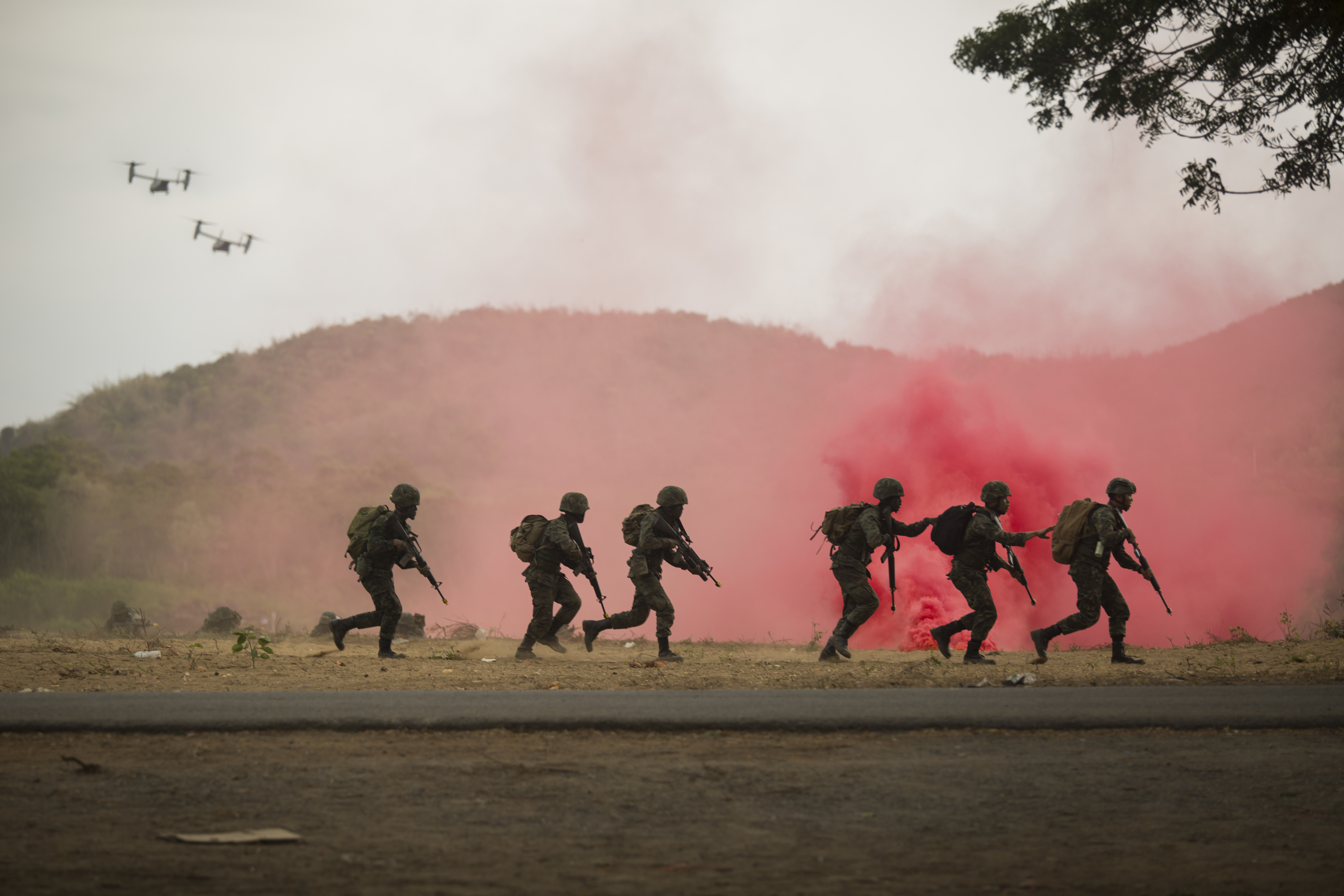
U.S. Marines assault the beach as part of the amphibious beach landing at Hat Yao Beach, Thailand, during Cobra Gold 2020

Cobra Gold expanded to include 27 nations as of 2021, including Indonesia, Japan, Malaysia, Singapore, South Korea, and other South Asian and Pacific Ocean countries. China was admitted to Cobra Gold exercises for the first time in 2015, although Chinese military forces were only allowed to participate in humanitarian assistance training. Most nations participate in Cobra Gold as observers rather than as participants. In 2020, these countries participated in the exercise:

- Participants: the United States, Thailand, Singapore, South Korea, Indonesia, Japan, and Malaysia
- Observers: Brunei, Laos, Cambodia, Israel, Vietnam, Germany, Pakistan, Sri Lanka, Brazil, and Sweden
- Multinational Planning Augmentation Team: Australia, Canada, France, the United Kingdom, Nepal, the Philippines, Fiji, and New Zealand
- Others: China and India.

== Cobra Gold Exercises 2013–2016 ==
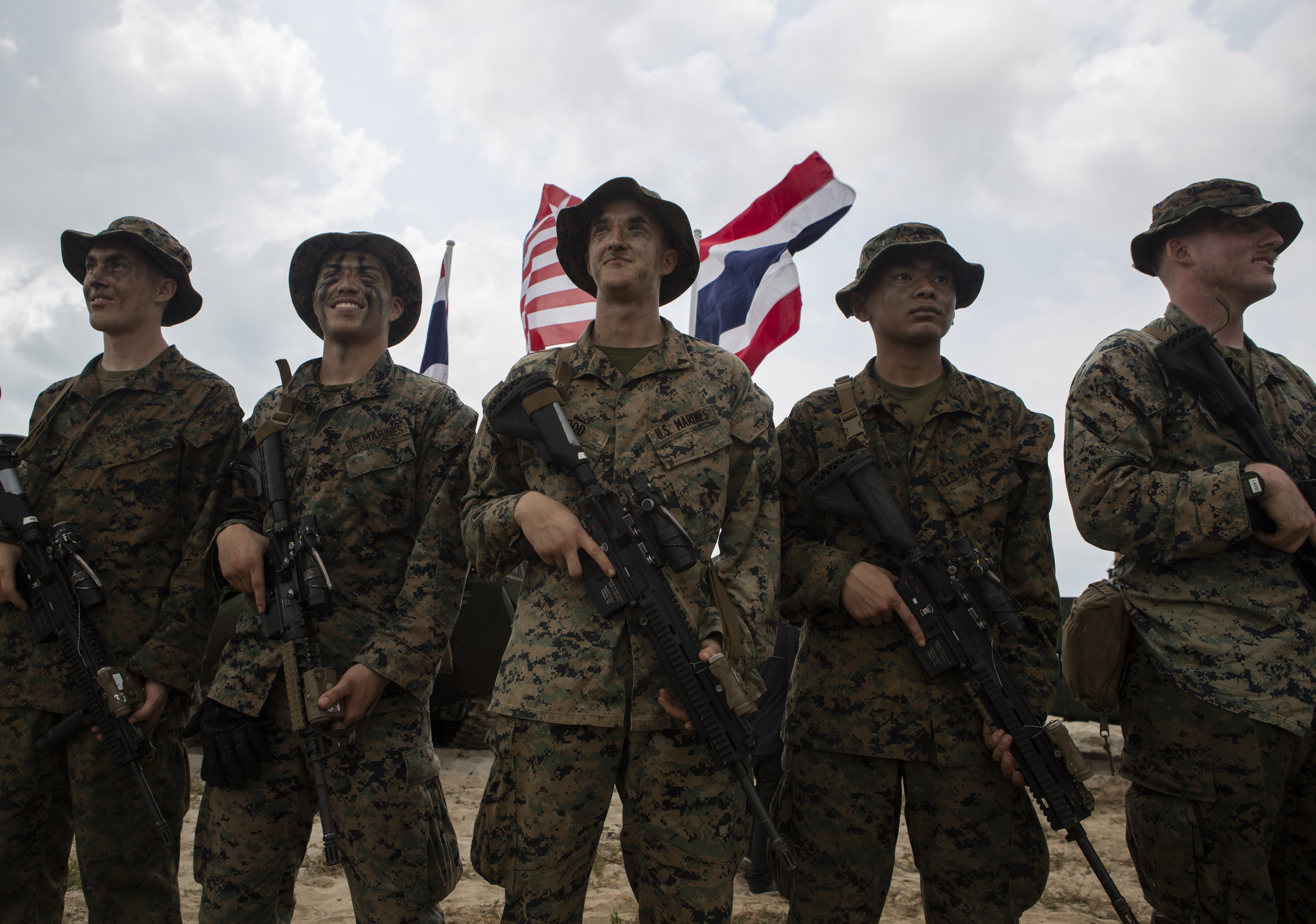
U.S. Marines participate in the amphibious beach landing at Hat Yao Beach, Thailand during Cobra Gold 2020

Participants in Cobra Gold 2013 included the United States, Indonesia, Japan, Malaysia, Singapore, South Korea, and Thailand. Twenty other nations participated as observers. For the first time, Burma joined the exercise (as an observer). Activities held during Cobra Gold 2013 included an amphibious landing involving ground assault fighter jets, attack helicopters, and landing craft; mock military raids involving small boats and helicopters; a practice evacuation involving civilian populations; a combined arms exercise held while live fire occurred overhead and nearby; and training in biological, chemical, jungle, nuclear, and radiological warfare.

Admiral Samuel J. Locklear III, commander of the United States Pacific Command, described Cobra Gold as "the Pacific's signature exercise" in 2014 and noted that it was among the largest multinational military exercises in which U.S. armed forces participate.

The United States reduced its participation in Cobra Gold 2015 because it disapproved of the military coup in Thailand in 2014. The U.S. sent 3,600 troops to the exercise in 2015, down from 4,300 in 2014. They also canceled the exercise in which troops practiced under live fire during an amphibious landing. However, American military forces participated in a civilian evacuation training exercise and a field training exercise in cooperation with other nations' military forces. More than 13,000 military personnel from six nations participated in Cobra Gold 2015, while other nations participated as observers.

The United States postponed its participation in a March 2015 meeting with Thailand to begin planning for Cobra Gold 2016. American military officials indicated they might cancel the exercise outright as a protest against continuing military rule in Thailand.

== Exercise Cobra Gold 2017 ==
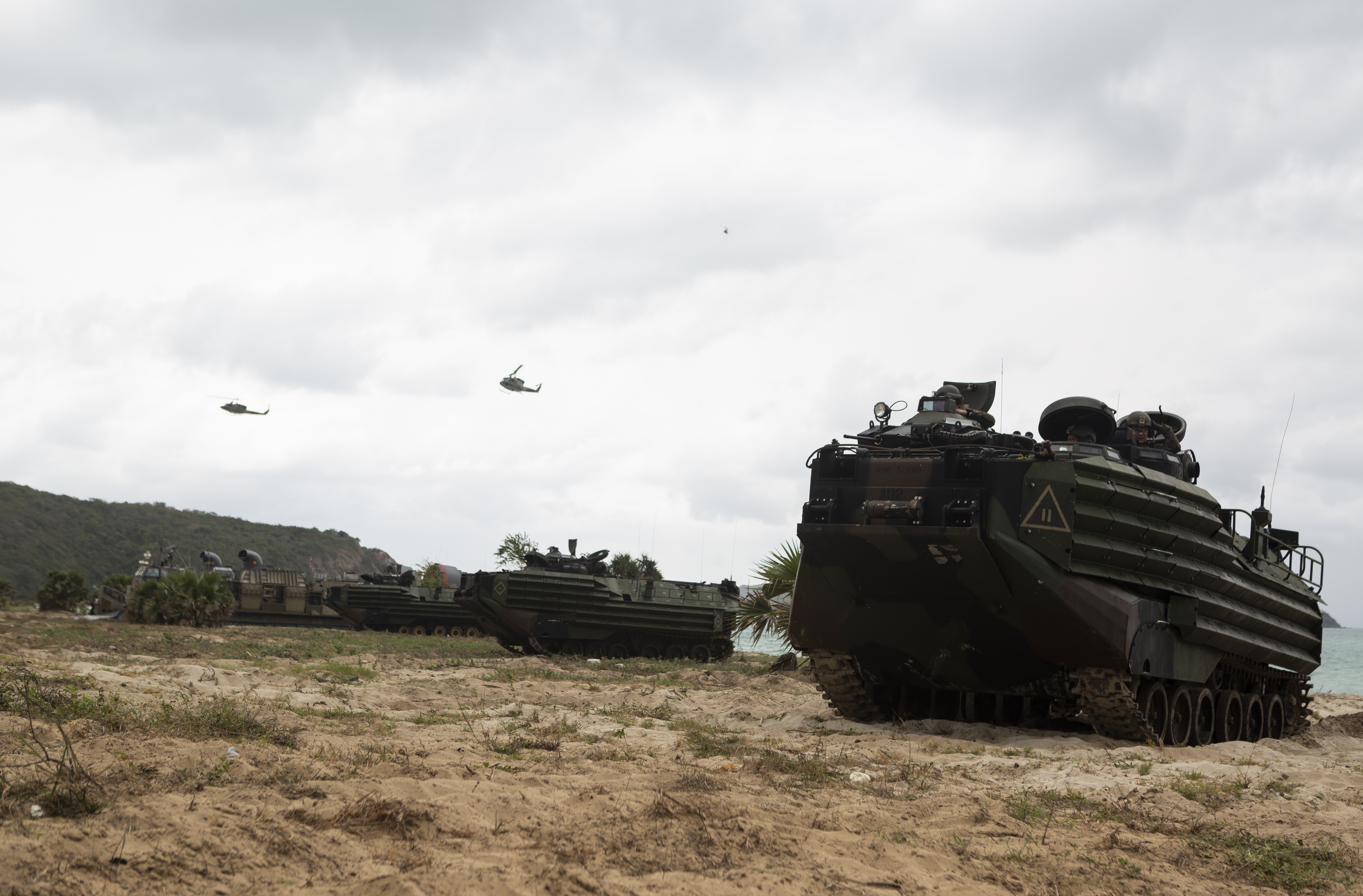
U.S. Marine assault amphibious vehicles (AAVs) during an amphibious beach landing during Cobra Gold 2020

In 2017, 29 nations participated in Cobra Gold either directly or as observers. This marked the 36th anniversary of the Cobra Gold exercise. Cobra Gold 2017 aimed to improve capabilities among participating nations, including conducting joint operations and building relationships. Also, it aimed to enhance the relationship between Thailand and the United States after the Thai power seizure in 2014 caused Thai-U.S. relations to deteriorate. Field exercises included various training methods, such as an Amphibious Assault Demonstration, an EOD mission, Close Air Support (CAS), and a Combined Arms Live-Fire Exercise (CALFEX), an exercise on strategical engagement using various types of weapons.

Civic action training included humanitarian assistance and non-combatant evacuation operation (NEO). The NEO was led by the Japan Air Self Defense Force (JASDF) during disaster relief operations. A NEO moves noncombatant personnel from dangerous areas caused by natural disaster.

In 2018, the United States urged to remove Myanmar as an observer due to the Rohingya conflict.

== Exercise Cobra Gold 2020 ==
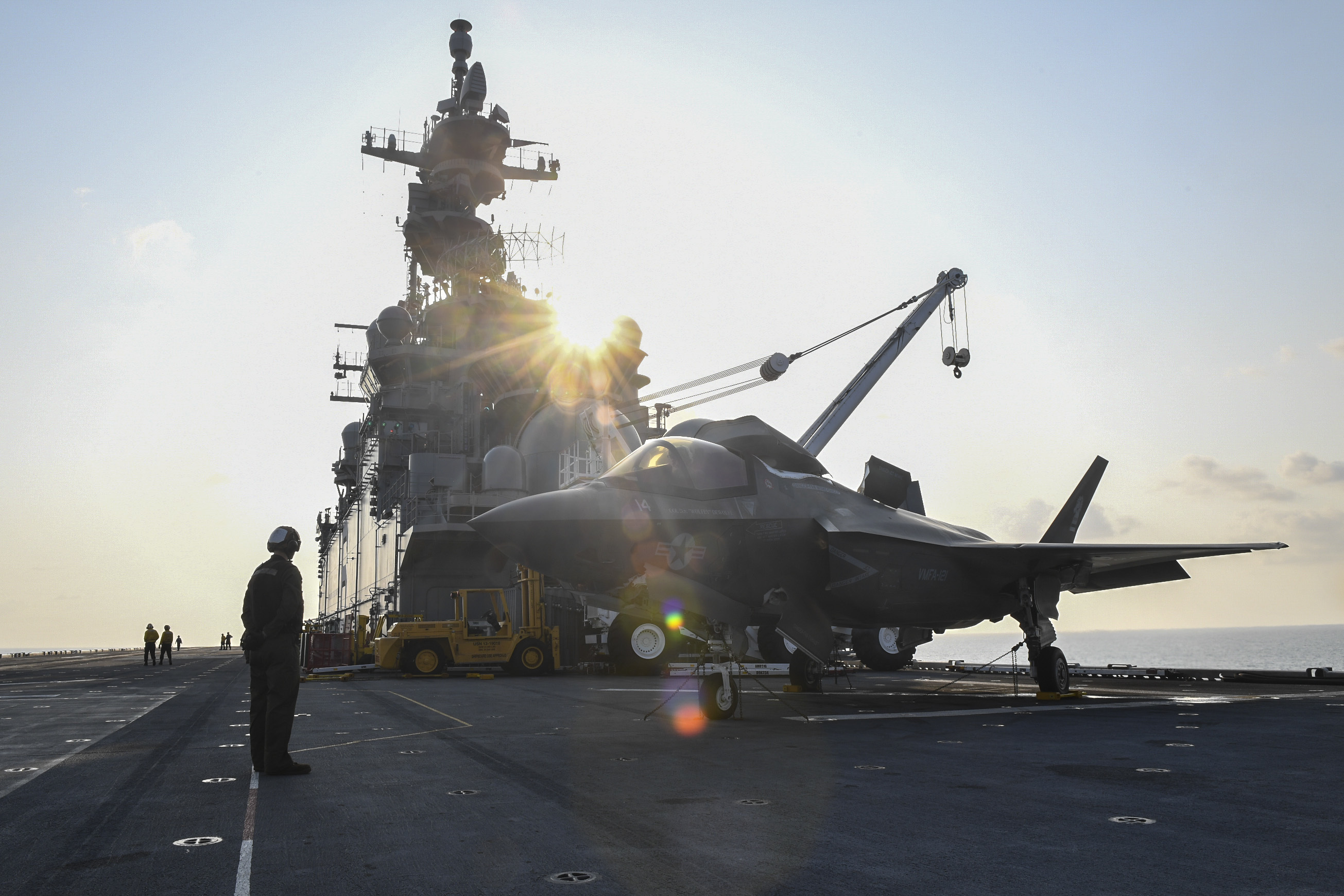
U.S. Marine F-35Bs conducting flight operations during Cobra Gold 2020

Twenty-seven nations participated in the 39th iteration of Cobra Gold, from February 25 to March 6, 2020. Cobra Gold 20 aimed to enhance the capabilities of participating nations to plan and conduct combined and joint operation, build relationships among participating nations across the region, and improve interoperability over a range of activities, including strengthening maritime security, preventing and mitigating emerging disease threats, and responding to large-scale natural disasters.

Cobra Gold 2020 introduced a new landmine reduction operation and the participation of the Marine Corps F-35B Lightning II fighter aircraft and High Mobility Artillery Rocket Systems. The HIMARS purpose is to conduct bilateral training at the battery-level on the weapon system, developing interoperability between the United States, the Royal Thai Air Force (RTAF), and other regional nations and partners. The continuation of exercises such as Cobra Gold demonstrates the commitment of the Kingdom of Thailand and the United States to their long-standing alliance. [according to whom?]

Leaders and commanders from Indo-Pacific nations participating in Cobra Gold 2020 came together to give final remarks and shake hands as the two-week-long exercise came to a close at Ban Dan Lan Hoi, Kingdom of Thailand on March 6, 2020.

== Outcomes ==
The United States has engaged in only a single, very minor military intervention in the Pacific area since the end of the Vietnam War, making it challenging to judge Cobra Gold's effectiveness in improving warfighting capabilities and coordination.

Cobra Gold has proven effective in improving coordinated military response to natural disasters, including the 2004 Indian Ocean tsunami, the 2011 Tōhoku tsunami, and disaster relief provided to the Philippines after Typhoon Haiyan struck in November 2013.
