= Rand Strategy Assessment Center =

The RAND Strategy Assessment Center was first conceived in 1979 with the goal of developing “new methods for strategic analysis that combine the best features or war gaming and analytical modeling.” Work began in April 1980. The initial request for the center came from the Department of Defense while the funding was provided by the Defense Nuclear Agency. The interactive, computer supported, war-gaming system uses Red (Soviets) and Blue (United States) force models (also known as Agents). These represent the two superpowers primarily being researched. There is also a Scenario Agent, which represents non-superpower countries, and a Force Agent, which simulates the results of military operations and combat. The significance of this program was that humans were no longer needed to run these complex simulations. It was now possible for the computer to almost single-handedly run iteration after iteration. Humans could step in and change the scenario, variables, or even take over completely if they so desired, although it was not necessary. The goal was to capture the human-expert contribution and inject that knowledge into the artificial intelligence controlling the computer models.

== Mission ==
The need for this arose during the late 1970s when current US strategic-nuclear analysis wasn't in depth enough. The current thinking in the US at the time was heavily revolving around the idea of Mutual Assured Destruction (MAD). Many believed that it would be one all-or-nothing nuclear attack or retaliation that would determine the fate of the two superpowers. The idea was to expand on this thinking, more concurrent with the Soviet ideal that bringing nuclear weapons into a war, wouldn't be the end. The U.S.S.R. had contingencies for a variety of scenarios, whereas the US really only had the one.

The RSAC's objective was to improve the United States’ strategies in both nuclear and non-nuclear war. Each superpower was given an automated decision making model based on the best knowledge the US had at the time. The scientists also wanted to include a third Agent which would represent the non-superpower countries both militarily and politically. Previous simulations had been relatively shallow and had not taken into account how third parties could affect each scenario, whether it is the permission to use their airspace, or actual military forces. Now, the RSAC would be able to run “efficient, rigorous, and analytical” war gaming from beginning to end. This could be repeated at will, in a timely fashion, and with all data being recorded for reference later.

Below are some of the RSAC objectives put forth in the paper by Paul K. Davis and James A. Winnefeld titled “An Overview and Interim Conclusions about Utility and Development Options.”

- To create an Integrated Framework – a means to analyze and discuss military strategy in all conflicts, including a prolonged nuclear war, anywhere in the world.
- To develop the capability for Multiscenario Analysis – an increased capability would “…test sensitivities to key variables…” including superpower strategy, behavior patterns, operational art, battle outcomes, and non-superpower countries involvement.
- To increase Analysis Realism – including factors that are normally ignored. Examples include operational constraints, asymmetries in the US and Soviet objectives, attitudes and military styles, and third country decisions and/or actions.
- Provide tools to improve understanding of Strategic Dynamics- these include interrelationships, possible cascade effects and decision points.

== Program Forces ==
The Program Forces or Agents, are rule-based models used within the RSAC system. When designing these, a few necessary requirements needed to be met. The agents needed to be able to make operational and strategy decisions including, but not limited to, designing a war plan, deciding where to allocate forces, and whether or not to enter a battle depending on the risk vs. payoff. They also must be able to base their decisions on future projections of the conflict, not only the immediate future. For example, Blue Agent must first assess the current situation between itself and Red Agent, then consider the Scenario Agent's status, and then make a possible prediction of a future scenario involving all three. The Agents are also able to adjust and make course corrections based on conflict outcomes and the amount of intelligence available to them. Lastly, some ‘’soft factors’’ are injected into the mix. An Agent should also attempt to determine the will and intentions of the opponent, morale of the troops and country, and also the strength of current alliances if applicable. Below are the Agents involved in the RSAC system.

Red Agent – This is the opposing superpower force in the simulation. Usually this is the Soviet Union or countries united under the Warsaw Pact.

Blue Agent- This is the homeland superpower force in the simulation. Usually this is represented by the United States of America or the NATO countries.

Scenario Agent- This is the force that represents all other non-superpower nations.

Force Agent- This force keeps track of other Agent forces on the global scale, and also simulates the outcome of battles and military operations. It also acts as a time keeper for the simulation.

However omniscient they may sound, one of the most important features of these automatons is their ability to make mistakes and develop false models. Blue may decide that a military battle would be their best option, although it might have delayed or incomplete intelligence of Red. Another scenario might involve the two sides computing a battle victory using different standards. Red may decide to battle Blue, even if it knows they will not ‘’win’’ the battle. Its goal may just be to weaken Blue's forces enough to set them back a few weeks or months. So Blue would calculate a victory, but so would Red. The different victory calculations and the ability to make realistic mistakes just add to the fidelity of this simulation.
