= List of Medal of Honor recipients for the Vietnam War =

The Medal of Honor was created during the American Civil War and is the highest military decoration presented by the United States government to a member of its armed forces. The recipients must have distinguished themselves at the risk of their own life above and beyond the call of duty in action against an enemy of the United States. Due to the nature of this medal, it is commonly presented posthumously.

The Vietnam War, (also known as the Second Indochina War, Vietnam Conflict, and in Vietnam as the American War), took place from 1955 to 1975. The war was fought between the Communist-supported North Vietnam and the United States-supported South Vietnam, beginning with the presence of a small number of US military advisors in 1955 and escalating into direct US involvement in a ground war in 1965. US combat forces were withdrawn in early 1973 pursuant to the Paris Peace Accords, but the war continued concluding with the Fall of Saigon on 30 April 1975.

During the Vietnam War and in the following twelve months, 235 Medals of Honor were awarded and since 1978 a further 35 awards have been presented. Of the total of 270 awards, 180 were to the US Army, 15 to the US Navy, 58 to the USMC and 14 to the USAF. These totals do not include the award to the Vietnam Unknown Soldier.

The first Medal of Honor presentation for Vietnam was to Captain Roger Donlon for actions on 6 July 1964 as commanding officer of the U.S. Army Special Forces Detachment defending Camp Nam Dong against a Viet Cong attack. The last actions to earn a Medal of Honor in this war were those of Bud Day, for actions as a prisoner of war from 26 August 1967 through 14 March 1973. Day and three others were presented with the Medal of Honor by President Ford at the White House on March 4, 1976. They were the last of the 235 servicemen awarded the Medal of Honor during the Vietnam War and in the following twelve months.

The first African American recipient of the war was Milton L. Olive III who sacrificed himself to save others by smothering a grenade with his body. Riley L. Pitts was killed after attacking an enemy force with rifle fire and grenades and was the first African American commissioned officer of the war to receive the medal. Thomas Bennett and Joseph LaPointe were conscientious objectors who received the medal for their actions as medics; three chaplains received the medal, including Vincent R. Capodanno, who served with the Marine Corps and was known as the "Grunt Padre".

== Recipients ==
† the Medal of Honor was awarded posthumously.
All locations are in South Vietnam unless otherwise stated.

Image	Name	Service	Rank	Place of action	Date of action	Notes
Head and shoulders of a white man with short hair and a slight smile, wearing a military jacket with ribbon bars and a winged pin on the left breast.	William E. Adams †	Army	Major	Kon Tum province	May 25, 1971	Killed while flying his helicopter in a rescue mission
	Bennie Adkins	Army	Sergeant First Class	A Shau Valley, South Vietnam	March 9, 1966	Distinguished himself during 38 hours of close-combat battle against Viet Cong forces during the Battle of A Shau
	Lewis Albanese †	Army	Private First Class	South Vietnam	December 1, 1966	After participating in the defeat of an enemy assault, he was killed in hand-to-hand combat
	Leonard L. Alvarado †	Army	Specialist Four	Phước Long province	August 12, 1969	For disrupting an enemy raid and saving the lives of several comrades
Head of a young black man wearing a dark military jacket and a white peaked cap with a black visor.	James Anderson Jr. †	Marine Corps	Private First Class	Near Cam Lộ	February 28, 1967	For covering an enemy grenade with his body to protect fellow Marines
Head and shoulders of a young white man with a cleft chin wearing a dark military jacket and a white peaked cap with a black visor.	Richard A. Anderson †	Marine Corps	Lance Corporal	Quảng Trị province	August 24, 1969	For covering an enemy grenade with his body to protect fellow Marines on a recon mission.
	Webster Anderson	Army	Staff Sergeant	Tam Kỳ	October 15, 1967	Although wounded multiple times, he continued to fight and refused medical aid until the enemy attack was over.
	Eugene Ashley Jr. †	Army	Sergeant First Class	near Lang Vei	February 6, 1968 – February 7, 1968	Risked his life attempting to save the lives of his entrapped comrades and commanding officer
Head of a young black man staring intently at the camera, wearing a dark military jacket and a white peaked cap with a black visor.	Oscar P. Austin †	Marine Corps	Private First Class	west of Da Nang	February 23, 1969	Threw himself between enemy fire and an injured fellow Marine
Head and shoulders of a young white man looking off to the side, wearing a peaked cap and a military jacket over a shirt and tie.	John P. Baca	Army	Specialist Four	Phước Long province	February 10, 1970	Covered a grenade with his helmet and body, saving eight men
Head and torso of a young white man with long bangs combed to one side, wearing a military jacket with a shoulder cord, stripes on the upper sleeve, and ribbon bars and pins on the left breast.	Nicky D. Bacon	Army	Staff Sergeant	west of Tam Kỳ	August 26, 1968	Risked his life by repeatedly leading groups of men in fighting back an enemy attack
Head and shoulders of a white man with short dark hair wearing a military jacket with a star-shaped medal hanging loosely from a ribbon around his neck.	John F. Baker Jr.	Army	Private First Class	South Vietnam	November 5, 1966	He was directly responsible for saving the lives of several of his comrades, and inflicting serious damage on the enemy.
	Donald E. Ballard	Navy	Hospital Corpsman Second Class	Quảng Trị province	May 16, 1968	Risked his life by smothering a grenade with his own body
Head and shoulders of a young white man wearing a white peaked cap with a black visor and a dark military jacket with bright buttons down the center.	Jedh C. Barker †	Marine Corps	Lance Corporal	near Con Thien	September 21, 1967	Threw himself on a grenade to save fellow Marines
Head and shoulders of a smiling young white man wearing a peaked cap and a military jacket with a name tag which reads "Barnes" on the right breast.	John A. Barnes, III †	Army	Private First Class	Đắk Tô	November 12, 1967	Sacrificed his life by throwing himself directly onto a hand grenade as it exploded.
Head and shoulders of a middle-aged white man wearing a white peaked cap with oak leaf decorations on the visor and a dark military jacket with two rows of medals hanging from ribbons pinned to his chest and another medal hanging from his neck.	Harvey C. Barnum Jr.	Marine Corps	First Lieutenant	Ky Phu, Quảng Tín province	December 18, 1965	Assumed command of a rifle company upon death of the commander in an ambush and directed the counterattack.
Head and torso of a white man wearing a beret with a shield-shaped patch on the front and a dark military jacket. His hands are crossed in front of him; on a finger of his left hand is a ring and on his right hand is a metal bracelet.	Gary B. Beikirch	Army	Sergeant	Kon Tum province	April 1, 1970	Endured hostile gunfire and serious injuries to save several wounded soldiers.
	Ted Belcher †	Army	Sergeant	Plei Djerang	November 19, 1966	For smothering a grenade blast with his body to protect those around him
—	Leslie A. Bellrichard †	Army	Private First Class	Kon Tum province	May 20, 1967	For smothering a grenade blast with his body to protect those around him
Head and shoulders of a middle-aged Hispanic man wearing a beret with unit patch and green military jacket with five rows of medals hanging from ribbons pinned to his chest and another medal hanging from his neck.	Roy P. Benavidez	Army	Staff Sergeant	west of Lộc Ninh	May 2, 1968	For a series of daring and valorous actions despite severe wounds
Head of a young white man with thick hair wearing a dark military jacket with a "U.S." pin on the lapel.	Steven L. Bennett †	Air Force	Captain	Quảng Trị	June 29, 1972	Sacrificed his life to save the life of his passenger
Shadowy profile of smiling young white man wearing a dark suit coat over a white shirt and dark tie.	Thomas W. Bennett †	Army	Corporal	Chu Pa Region, Pleiku province	February 9, 1969 – February 11, 1969	For saving many lives as a medic during a number of vicious firefights. Second conscientious objector to receive the Medal of Honor.
Head and shoulders of an older man, wearing a dark business jacket, with a medal hanging from a ribbon around his neck.	Dwight W. Birdwell	Army	Specialist Five	Tan Son Nhut Air Base, Saigon	January 31, 1968	For his role in the Tet offensive attack on Tan Son Nhut Air Base. Medal awarded on 5 July 2022.
Head and shoulders of a young white man wearing a helmet with a camouflage-patterned cloth cover and a coat, standing before a camouflage-patterned background.	Michael R. Blanchfield †	Army	Specialist Four	Bình Định province	July 3, 1969	For smothering a grenade blast with his body to protect those around him
Head and shoulders of a young white man wearing a dark peaked cap and a dark military jacket over a shirt and tie. On the collar of the shirt is a bar-shaped pin.	John P. Bobo †	Marine Corps	Second Lieutenant	Quảng Trị province	March 30, 1967	Held his position in the face of enemy ambush despite having his lower leg blown off, allowing the remainder of his outnumbered unit to move to safety.
	James L. Bondsteel	Army	Staff Sergeant	An Lộc, Bình Phước province	May 24, 1969	He destroyed 10 enemy bunkers and accounted for a large toll of the enemy, including two key enemy commanders
	Hammett L. Bowen Jr. †	Army	Staff Sergeant	Bình Dương province	June 27, 1969	For smothering a grenade blast with his body to protect those around him
Head and shoulders of a white man with dark hair wearing a military jacket with a round patch on the upper sleeve, and oak leaf emblem atop the shoulder, and ribbon bars and pins on the left breast.	Patrick H. Brady	Army	Major	near Chu Lai	January 6, 1968	Flew multiple missions against heavy fire to evacuate 51 wounded men
Head of a young white man wearing a white peaked cap with black visor and a dark military jacket with a pin on each side of the upright collar.	Daniel D. Bruce †	Marine Corps	Private First Class	Fire Support Base Tomahawk, Quảng Nam province	March 1, 1969	Carried an explosive device away from three other Marines
	William M. Bryant †	Army	Sergeant First Class	Long Khánh District	March 24, 1969	Showed conspicuous leadership while organizing his unit's defense during a 34-hour enemy attack
Bucha in 2011	Paul W. Bucha	Army	Captain	near Phuoc Vinh, Bình Dương province	March 16, 1968 – March 19, 1968	Led his company in the decimation of a superior enemy force which left 156 dead on the battlefield
—	Brian L. Buker †	Army	Sergeant	Châu Đốc province	April 5, 1970	Sacrificed his life to lead his men against the enemy and personally destroyed two enemy bunkers with hand grenades
Head and shoulders of a young white man wearing a white peaked cap with black visor and a dark military jacket with bright buttons down the center of the chest.	Robert C. Burke †	Marine Corps	Private First Class	southern Quảng Nam province	May 17, 1968	After his unit was ambushed, he assaulted the enemy forces, allowing the remainder of the unit to recover wounded and continue their advance
	John Canley	Marine Corps	Gunnery sergeant	Huế	January 31, 1968 – February 6, 1968	Awarded for his role in the Battle of Huế. Originally awarded the Navy Cross which was upgraded to the Medal of Honor on October 17, 2018.
	James C. Capers Jr.	Marine Corps	Second lieutenant	Phú Lộc district	March 31, 1967 – April 3, 1967	Awarded for his role leading the 3rd Force Reconnaissance Company. Originally awarded the Silver Star which was upgraded to the Medal of Honor on June 18, 2026.
Head and shoulders of a white man with short hair neatly combed, wearing a dark suit coat and tie.	Vincent R. Capodanno †	Navy	Lieutenant	Quảng Tín province	September 4, 1967	A Chaplain who was killed while attempting to rescue a wounded corpsman
Head and shoulders of a young white man wearing a dark sailor suit with an eagle patch on the upper sleeve.	Wayne M. Caron †	Navy	Hospital Corpsman Third Class	Quảng Nam province	July 28, 1968	Was killed while providing medical attention to several wounded Marines
Head of a young white man wearing a white peaked cap with black visor and a dark military jacket.	Bruce W. Carter †	Marine Corps	Private First Class	Quảng Trị province	August 7, 1969	Sacrificed his life to save several Marines by smothering a grenade with his body
Head and shoulders of a man with gray hair, a full gray beard, and tinted glasses in a tuxedo. A medal, hanging from a blue ribbon around his neck, sits just below his bow tie.	Jon R. Cavaiani	Army	Staff Sergeant	South Vietnam	June 4, 1971 – June 5, 1971	Risked his life by attacking a wave of enemy forces alone to allow the rest of his platoon to escape
Head of a white man with a thin mustache wearing a white peaked cap with black visor and a dark military jacket with a medal hanging from a ribbon at the neck.	Raymond M. Clausen Jr.	Marine Corps	Private First Class	South Vietnam	January 31, 1970	Risked his life to rescue several Marines and corpsman from a minefield
Head of a heavyset young white man with wire-frame glasses wearing a white peaked cap with black visor and a dark military jacket.	Ronald L. Coker †	Marine Corps	Private First Class	Quảng Trị province	March 24, 1969	For assaulting an enemy position and aiding a fallen Marine despite severe wounds to himself
	Felix M. Conde-Falcon †	Army	Staff Sergeant	Ap Tan Hoa	April 4, 1969	Killed while assaulting heavily fortified enemy bunkers
Head of a white man wearing a garrison cap and a dark military jacket over a light-colored shirt.	Peter S. Connor †	Marine Corps	Staff Sergeant	Quảng Nam province	February 25, 1966	For absorbing the blast of a malfunctioning grenade in order to protect his fellow Marines
Head and shoulders of a smiling white man wearing a light-colored garrison cap and buttoned-down shirt with a bar-shaped pin on each side of the collar.	Donald G. Cook †	Marine Corps	Captain	South Vietnam	December 31, 1964 – December 8, 1967	For assisting fellow prisoners while a prisoner of war
ArdieRCopas243	Ardie R. Copas †	Army	Specialist Four	Ph Romeas Hek, Cambodia	May 12, 1970	Killed while holding off an enemy ambush while wounded, so his comrades could be evacuated
Head and shoulders of a dark-haired white man wearing a dark military jacket with four rows of ribbon bars and a winged pin on the left breast.	Bruce P. Crandall	Army	Major	Battle of Ia Drang	November 14, 1965	For repeatedly flying into a landing zone under intense enemy fire to rescue and resupply ground troops
Head of a young white man with a big smile, wearing a white peaked cap with black visor and a dark military jacket.	Thomas E. Creek †	Marine Corps	Lance Corporal	near Cam Lộ	February 13, 1969	Sacrificed his life to save five Marines by smothering a grenade with his body
Head of a smiling young white man wearing a dark peaked cap and a dark jacket over a shirt and tie.	Michael J. Crescenz †	Army	Corporal	Hiệp Đức Valley area	November 20, 1968	For single-handedly destroying two bunkers while under fire from a third machine gun during an ambush
	Nicholas J. Cutinha †	Army	Specialist Four	near Gia Định	March 2, 1968	Maintained his position, refused assistance, and provided defensive fire for his comrades until he fell mortally wounded. He was solely responsible for killing 15 enemy soldiers while saving the lives of at least nine members of his own unit.
Head and shoulders of a young man with thick-framed glasses in military uniform. He is wearing a peaked cap and a military jacket with a "US" pin on the lapel over a shirt and dark tie	Larry G. Dahl †	Army	Specialist Four	An Khê, Bình Định province	February 23, 1971	For smothering a grenade blast with his body to protect those around him
	Kenneth J. David	Army	Specialist Four	Thua Thien province	May 7, 1970	For defending wounded soldiers
Head and shoulders of an older black man, wearing a dark military jacket, with a medal hanging from a ribbon around his neck.	Paris Davis	Army	Captain	Bồng Sơn, Bình Định province	June 18, 1965	For rescuing several of his men though wounded and defending their position until relieved
Head of a young black man looking off to the side, wearing a white peaked cap with black visor and dark military jacket.	Rodney M. Davis †	Marine Corps	Sergeant	Quảng Nam province	September 6, 1967	Sacrificed his life to save several of his fellow Marines by smothering a grenade with his body
A white man with thick hair and a closely trimmed beard standing with his hands crossed in front of him. He is wearing a suit coat with a star-shaped medal hanging from a ribbon around his neck.	Sammy L. Davis	Army	Private First Class	West of Cai Lậy	November 18, 1967	For defending his 42-man unit from hundreds of attacking Viet Cong
Head and shoulders of an older white man with glasses, wearing a white military jacket with a very large array of ribbon bars on the left breast and two medals hanging from ribbons around his neck.	George E. Day	Air Force	Major	North Vietnam	August 26, 1967	For actions as a prisoner of war from August 26, 1967 – March 4, 1973
Head of a young Hispanic man wearing a white peaked cap with black visor and a dark military jacket with an eagle-globe-and-anchor pin on either side of the upright collar.	Emilio A. De La Garza Jr. †	Marine Corps	Lance Corporal	near Da Nang	April 11, 1970	Sacrificed his life and saved several Marines by blocking them from the blast of a grenade
Head and shoulders of a man with short hair and a round face in a dark blue military jacket. Rows of ribbon bars and a winged pin are on his left breast and a medal hangs from a light blue ribbon around his neck.	Merlyn H. Dethlefsen	Air Force	Captain	over North Vietnam	March 10, 1967	Flew repeated close range strikes to silence enemy defensive positions, ignoring overwhelming firepower and damage to his own aircraft
—	Edward A. DeVore Jr. †	Army	Specialist Four	near Saigon	March 17, 1968	Sacrificed his life to draw the enemy fire upon himself allowing a trapped squad to rejoin their platoon
Head of a young Hispanic man wearing a dark military jacket and a white peaked cap with a black visor and an eagle-globe-and-anchor emblem on the front.	Ralph E. Dias †	Marine Corps	Private First Class	Quế Sơn Mountains	November 12, 1969	Although severely wounded multiple times by enemy fire, he continued to throw grenades at an enemy bunker until it was destroyed and he was killed by enemy gunfire.
Head and shoulders of a smiling young white man wearing a cloth army cap and a plain buttoned-down shirt of the same color.	Douglas E. Dickey †	Marine Corps	Private First Class	South Vietnam	March 26, 1967	Sacrificed his life to save several fellow Marines by diving on a grenade and absorbing the explosion with his body
Profile of a white man with a full, gray beard wearing a star-shaped medal from a blue ribbon around his neck.	Drew D. Dix	Army	Staff Sergeant	Châu Đốc province	January 31, 1968 – February 1, 1968	His actions resulted in 14 confirmed Viet Cong killed in action and possibly 25 more, the capture of 20 prisoners, 15 weapons, and the rescue of the 14 United States and free world civilians
—	Stephen H. Doane †	Army	First Lieutenant	Hậu Nghĩa province	March 25, 1969	Although already wounded, he sacrificed his life to save other soldiers who were pinned down by silencing two enemy gun emplacements and diving into a third with a grenade.
Head and shoulders of a bearded white man wearing a black dress jacket with white shirt and a medal hanging from his neck.	David C. Dolby	Army	Specialist Four	South Vietnam	May 21, 1966	For silencing three enemy positions and rescuing several wounded comrades
Head and shoulders of a white man with short hair, wearing a military jacket with a star-shaped medal hanging from a ribbon around his neck.	Roger H. C. Donlon	Army	Captain	near Nam Đông	July 6, 1964	Rescued and administered first aid to several wounded soldiers and led a group to defeat an enemy force, causing them to retreat and leaving behind 54 of their dead, many weapons, and grenades.
Head and shoulders of an older white man, wearing a dark military jacket, with a medal hanging from a ribbon around his neck.	John J. Duffy	Army	Major	Firebase Charlie, Kon Tum province	April 14, 1972 – April 15, 1972	For his role leading the defense of Firebase Charlie during the Battle of Kon Tum. Medal awarded on 5 July 2022.
—	Kern W. Dunagan	Army	Captain	Quảng Tín province	May 13, 1969	Although wounded, he directed fire onto enemy positions and rescued several wounded soldiers.
	Jesus S. Duran †	Army	Sergeant	Ph Romeas Hek, Cambodia	April 10, 1969	Saved wounded Americans on a search and clear operation
—	Harold Bascom Durham Jr. †	Army	Second Lieutenant	Ong Thanh, South Vietnam	October 17, 1967	Although wounded he directed fire on enemy positions and continued to fight until he died from his wounds
Head and shoulders of a young white man wearing a garrison cap with a large badge on the left side and a military jacket with a braided shoulder cord and several patches and pins on the lapels, shoulders, and chest.	Glenn H. English Jr. †	Army	Staff Sergeant	Phù Mỹ District	September 7, 1970	Was killed while attempting to rescue a wounded soldier from a personnel carrier
	Santiago J. Erevia	Army	Specialist Four	near Tam Kỳ	May 21, 1969	For his courageous actions while serving as radio telephone operator in Company C, 1st Battalion (Airmobile), 501st Infantry, 101st Airborne Division (Airmobile) during search and clear mission.
	Michael J. Estocin †	Navy	Lieutenant Commander	Hai Phong, North Vietnam	April 20, 1967 and April 26, 1967	Risked his life by attacking an enemy SAM site and other enemy targets multiple times
	Richard Etchberger †	Air Force	Chief Master Sergeant	Lima Site 85, Laos	March 11, 1968	Exposed himself to enemy fire in order to place his three surviving wounded comrades in rescue slings, permitting them to be airlifted to safety. It took an act of Congress for Etchberger to be reconsidered for this 2010 Medal of Honor, since the existence of Lima Site 85 had to be kept secret in 1968.
Head and shoulders of a young white man with a bright smile and neatly combed hair, wearing a dark sweater over a shirt and tie.	Donald W. Evans Jr. †	Army	Specialist Four	Tam Tri	January 27, 1967	Was a medic who was killed while treating and rescuing members of his unit. Evans Army Community Hospital, Ft Carson, was named after Evans.
—	Rodney J. Evans †	Army	Sergeant	Tây Ninh province	July 18, 1969	Killed protecting others during an ambush
Head of a man with short, dark hair wearing a formal military uniform. Rows of ribbon bars and a winged pin are on his left breast, and a medal hangs from a light blue ribbon around his neck.	Frederick E. Ferguson	Army	Chief Warrant Officer	Huế	January 31, 1968	Risked his life by flying his helicopter into heavy enemy fire to evacuate several wounded passengers and aircrew of a downed helicopter
Head of a young smiling Hispanic man wearing a green military uniform and peaked cap, with an American flag in the background.	Daniel Fernandez †	Army	Specialist Four	Củ Chi, Hậu Nghĩa province	February 18, 1966	Threw himself on an enemy grenade as it exploded, saving the lives of four comrades at the sacrifice of his life
Head and shoulders of a white man with a half-smile and short hair, wearing a military jacket with rows of ribbon bars on the left breast and a star-shaped medal hanging from a ribbon around his neck. A depiction of the same medal, gold with a blue ribbon, is in the upper left of the image.	Bernard F. Fisher	Air Force	Major	Biên Hòa and Pleiku, South Vietnam	March 10, 1966	For rescuing a downed airman despite heavy fire
	Michael J. Fitzmaurice	Army	Specialist Four	Khe Sanh	March 23, 1971	For absorbing an explosive charge and continuing to fight with weapons and hand to hand before successfully defending a bunker.
—	Charles C. Fleek †	Army	Sergeant	Bình Dương province	May 27, 1969	For smothering a grenade blast with his body to protect those around him
	James P. Fleming	Air Force	First Lieutenant	near Đức Cơ	November 26, 1968	For the rescue of a six-man special forces unit
Portrait of a middle-aged white man in a formal military uniform in front of a U.S. flag	Robert F. Foley	Army	Captain	near Dầu Tiếng	November 5, 1966	Despite his painful wounds, he refused medical aid and persevered in the forefront of the attack on the enemy redoubt. He led the assault on several enemy gun emplacements and, single-handedly, destroyed three such positions.
—	Michael F. Folland †	Army	Corporal	Long Khánh province	July 3, 1969	Sacrificed his life by smothering a grenade with his body
Head of a young white man wearing a dark military jacket and a white peaked cap with a black visor.	Paul H. Foster †	Marine Corps	Sergeant	near Con Thien	October 14, 1967	Sacrificed his life by smothering a grenade with his body
—	Douglas B. Fournet †	Army	First Lieutenant	A Shau Valley	May 4, 1968	Sacrificed his life in an attempt to defuse a claymore mine
—	James W. Fous †	Army	Private First Class	Kien Hoa province	May 14, 1968	For smothering a grenade blast with his body to protect those around him
Head and shoulders of a white man wearing a white peaked cap and a dark military jacket with ribbon bars on the right breast, two rows of medals hanging from ribbons on the left breast, and a star-shaped medal hanging from a light-blue ribbon at the neck. Behind him are an American flag and a red and yellow flag.	Wesley L. Fox	Marine Corps	First Lieutenant	Quảng Trị province	February 22, 1969	Although wounded, he directed fire on the enemy and led his platoon to drive the enemy back.
—	Frank R. Fratellenico †	Army	Corporal	Quảng Trị province	August 19, 1970	For smothering a grenade blast with his body to protect those around him.
Profiles of two men shaking hands. The man on the right, wearing a dark suit, has his left hand on the other man's shoulder. The man on the left is taller and wearing glasses, a military jacket, and a light-blue ribbon around his neck.	Ed Freeman	Army	Captain	Ia Drang Valley	November 14, 1965	For gallantry conducted as a UH–1 Huey pilot at LZ X–Ray
	Harold A. Fritz	Army	First Lieutenant	Bình Long province	January 11, 1969	Despite his wounds, he returned to his position, assisted his men, and refused medical attention until all of his wounded comrades had been treated and evacuated.
Head and shoulders of an older Asian man, wearing a dark business jacket, with a medal hanging from a ribbon around his neck.	Dennis Fujii	Army	Specialist Four	Firebase Ranger North, Savannakhet province, Laos	February 18, 1971 – February 22, 1971	For his role in the defense of Firebase Ranger North during Operation Lam Son 719. Medal awarded on 5 July 2022.
	Candelario Garcia †	Army	Sergeant	Lai Khê	December 8, 1968	Destroyed two enemy machine gun nests while saving wounded comrades
—	James A. Gardner †	Army	First Lieutenant	My Canh, South Vietnam	February 7, 1966	Sacrificed his life by single-handedly destroying several enemy gun positions until he was killed
—	John G. Gertsch †	Army	Staff Sergeant	A Shau Valley	July 15, 1969 – July 19, 1969	For providing covering fire for a medic working on a wounded soldier
A color image of Gonzalez wearing his combat uniform with Kevlar helmet.	Alfredo C. Gonzalez †	Marine Corps	Sergeant	Huế	February 4, 1968	Although seriously wounded, he destroyed an enemy bunker and fought back an enemy attack until he was killed.
A black and white image of Graham wearing his military uniform with ribbons and badges without a hat.	James A. Graham †	Marine Corps	Captain	Que Son Valley	June 2, 1967	After fighting off the enemy, he sacrificed his life by allowing the rest of his company to return to friendly lines, while he remained alone with an injured soldier who could not be moved due to his wounds.
—	Bruce A. Grandstaff †	Army	Platoon Sergeant	Pleiku province	May 18, 1967	Fought off an enemy attack until killed by an enemy rocket
—	Joseph X. Grant †	Army	First Lieutenant	South Vietnam	November 13, 1966	Killed by enemy mortar fire while attempting to rescue several injured Marines
A black and white image of Graves wearing his Marine Corps dress blue uniform without his hat.	Terrence C. Graves †	Marine Corps	Second Lieutenant	Quảng Trị province	February 16, 1968	For courageous leadership on an eight-man Marine recon patrol
—	Peter M. Guenette †	Army	Specialist Four	Tân Uyên, Bình Dương	May 18, 1968	Sacrificed his life by smothering a grenade with his body
A black and white image of Hagemeister wearing his military dress uniform with ribbons and badges without a hat.	Charles C. Hagemeister	Army	Specialist Four	Bình Định province	March 20, 1967	Risked his life to render medical aid to several injured soldiers and protected them until they could be evacuated
	Loren D. Hagen †	Army	First Lieutenant	A Shau Valley	August 7, 1971	For attempting to aid a critically wounded Special reconnaissance team member Bruce Allen Berg during a massive North Vietnamese Army assault.
—	Robert W. Hartsock †	Army	Staff Sergeant	Hậu Nghĩa province	February 23, 1969	For smothering an explosion with his body to protect those around him
—	Carmel B. Harvey Jr. †	Army	Specialist Four	Bình Định province	June 21, 1967	Sacrificed his life and attacked a group of enemy soldiers so that several injured members of his squad could escape
	Frank A. Herda	Army	Private First Class	near Đắk Tô	June 29, 1968	Risked his life to protect several wounded soldiers by smothering a grenade with his body
—	Robert J. Hibbs †	Army	Second Lieutenant	Don Dien Lo Ke, South Vietnam	March 5, 1966	Sacrificed his life to eliminate two companies of the enemy, rescue a fellow soldier and destroyed the starlight scope attached to his rifle to prevent its capture and use by the Viet Cong.
Head and torso of a smiling young man standing in front of a wooden staircase, wearing a short-sleeved military shirt with shoulder cords and a garrison cap.	John N. Holcomb †	Army	Sergeant	near Quản Lợi, South Vietnam	December 3, 1968	Risked his life to lead his men to fight back an attacking enemy force three times
A black and white image of Hooper wearing his army dress uniform with tie and no hat. He is turned slightly to the left.	Joe R. Hooper	Army	Sergeant	near Huế	February 21, 1968	Repeatedly risked his life to rescue wounded soldiers and attack groups of enemy soldiers
	Charles E. Hosking Jr. †	Army	Sergeant First Class	Phước Long province	March 21, 1967	For smothering a grenade blast with his body to protect those around him
A black and white image of Howard wearing his dress blue uniform with medals and no hat. His Medal of honor can be seen around his neck and he is turned slightly to the left.	Jimmie E. Howard	Marine Corps	Staff Sergeant	South Vietnam	June 16, 1966	Repeateadly repulsed enemy attacks and although severely wounded was able maintain control of his unit until help could arrive
A black-and-white photo of older balding white man in his dress military uniform without a hat	Robert L. Howard	Army	Sergeant First Class	South Vietnam	December 30, 1968	For actions during a rescue mission in enemy territory
A black-and-white photo of a young white man in his military dress uniform with hat	James D. Howe †	Marine Corps	Lance Corporal	South Vietnam	May 6, 1970	For smothering a grenade blast with his body to protect those around him
	George A. Ingalls †	Army	Specialist Four	near Đức Phổ	April 16, 1967	For smothering a grenade blast with his body to protect those around him
A smiling young man in military uniform, crouching with his forearms resting on his legs. His soft cap is pushed high up on his forehead and his dog tags hang out of his short-sleeved button shirt.	Robert R. Ingram	Navy	Hospital Corpsman Third Class	Quảng Ngãi province	March 28, 1966	Although badly wounded, he continued to assist and treat the injuries of the Marines around him who had been hurt in combat with the enemy.
	Joe M. Jackson	Air Force	Lieutenant Colonel	Kham Duc	May 12, 1968	For a daring airborne rescue of American special forces troops
A color photo of an older white man in a leather jacket with a large American flag in the background. He is looking down toward the ground and is holding a microphone.	Jack H. Jacobs	Army	First Lieutenant	Kien Phong province	March 9, 1968	Drove off squads of enemy soldiers on three occasions who were searching for allied wounded and weapons. He killed three and wounded several others.
Older bald man wearing black shirt with medal around neck	Don J. Jenkins	Army	Private First Class	Kien Phong province	January 6, 1969	Repeatedly attacked the enemy and although severely wounded risked his life to rescue several wounded soldiers
Jenkins in Vietnam with belts of ammo	Robert H. Jenkins Jr. †	Marine Corps	Private First Class	Firebase Argonne, South Vietnam	March 5, 1969	For using his body to shield a fellow Marine from a grenade blast
—	Delbert O. Jennings	Army	Staff Sergeant	Kim Son Valley, South Vietnam	December 27, 1966	Repeatedly attacked and defended his unit from enemy fire and assisted 8 wounded men who were trapped behind enemy lines
A black and white headshot of Jiminez wearing his military dress blue uniform with hat. He is looking slightly to the right.	Jose F. Jimenez †	Marine Corps	Lance Corporal	Quảng Nam province	August 28, 1969	Killed while attacking a group of enemy soldiers
A black and white image showing the head and torso of Joel in his military dress uniform with ribbons. His Medal of Honor is vsible around his neck.	Lawrence Joel	Army	Specialist Five	South Vietnam	November 8, 1965	Provided medical treatment to fellow soldiers while under heavy fire, despite being wounded twice, during Operation Hump
	Dwight H. Johnson	Army	Specialist Five	near Đắk Tô, Kon Tum province	January 15, 1968	Repeatedly exposed himself to enemy fire to man several different machine-guns until the enemy had been fought back
A black-and-white photo of a black man wearing his dress blue Marine Corps uniform with hat	Ralph H. Johnson †	Marine Corps	Private First Class	near the Quan Duc Valley, South Vietnam	March 5, 1968	For smothering a grenade blast with his body to protect those around him
	Donald R. Johnston †	Army	Specialist Four	Tây Ninh province	March 21, 1969	For smothering explosive blasts with his body to protect those around him
A black-and-white photo of an older white man in his military dress uniform	William A. Jones, III †	Air Force	Colonel	near Đồng Hới, North Vietnam	September 1, 1968	Risked his life to fly his heavily damaged plane back to base to relay the location of a downed pilot
—	Edward N. Kaneshiro †	Army	Staff sergeant	Kim Son Valley, Bình Định province	December 1, 1966	For his role in pushing forward an attack. Medal awarded on 5 July 2022.
—	Stephen E. Karopczyc †	Army	First Lieutenant	Kon Tum province	March 12, 1967	Sacrificed his life to save other soldiers by smothering a grenade with his body
Head and shoulders of a young man wearing a peaked cap, black thick-rimmed glasses, and a military jacket with a round pin on each lapel over a shirt and tie.	Terry T. Kawamura †	Army	Corporal	Camp Radcliff, South Vietnam	March 20, 1969	For smothering an explosive blast with his body to protect those around him
A black and white image showing the head and shoulders of Kaye in his military dress uniform with ribbons and hat.	Kenneth M. Kays	Army	Private	Thừa Thiên province	May 7, 1970	Risked his life to assist several fallen comrades and although injured in the attempt was able to administer first aid to himself and several of the wounded and helped them to safety.
	John J. Kedenburg †	Army	Specialist Five	South Vietnam	June 13, 1968	For letting a Vietnamese soldier take his spot in a helicopter rescue, while he stayed behind to attempt to hold off advancing Viet Cong by which he was overrun.
A black and white image showing the Keith from the waist up wearing his military dress uniform with hat.	Miguel Keith †	Marine Corps	Lance Corporal	Quảng Ngãi province	May 8, 1970	Sacrificed his life to single-handedly eliminate a group of enemy soldiers
Head and shoulders of a white man with wild white hair and a full beard wearing a dark suit with a star-shaped medal hanging from a blue ribbon around his neck.	Leonard B. Keller	Army	Sergeant	Ap Bac Zone, South Vietnam	May 2, 1967	Assaulted an enemy platoon with another soldier preventing further casualties
	Thomas G. Kelley	Navy	Lieutenant	Ong Muong Canal, Kien Hoa province, South Vietnam	June 15, 1969	Successfully relayed commands through one of his men until an enemy attack was silenced and the boats he was leading were able to move to safety
A black and white image of Kellogg from the chest up wearing his military dress blue uniform with medals. There is an American flag and a Marine Corps flag behind him and his Medal of Honor is around his neck.	Allan J. Kellogg	Marine Corps	Staff Sergeant	Quảng Nam province	March 11, 1970	For smothering a grenade blast with his body to protect those around him
A color image of Kerrey from the waist up wearing a suit and tie. He is smiling at the camera and there is a book shelf with books behind him.	J. Robert Kerrey	Navy	Lieutenant, Junior Grade	near Nha Trang Bay, South Vietnam	March 14, 1969	Led his SEAL team on a mission to capture important members of the enemy and although seriously injured in the battle they eliminated an enemy force and took several prisoners. Later became a U.S. Senator for the state of Nebraska. Prior to becoming a senator, he served as the governor from 1983 to 1987.
	Charles Kettles	Army	Major	near Đức Phổ, South Vietnam	May 15, 1967	As a helicopter pilot, reinforced and then evacuated an embattled unit despite intense hostile fire
	Thomas J. Kinsman	Army	Private First Class	near Vĩnh Long	February 6, 1968	For smothering a grenade blast with his body to protect those around him
—	Paul R. Lambers	Army	Sergeant	Tây Ninh province	August 20, 1968	For taking command of his platoon and exposing himself to enemy fire to reestablish communication, tend to wounded men, and continued fighting
—	George C. Lang	Army	Specialist Four	Kien Hoa province, South Vietnam	February 22, 1969	For destroying three enemy bunkers with grenades and rifle fire, helping to secure an enemy supply cache and directing his men after being seriously wounded.
—	Garfield M. Langhorn †	Army	Private First Class	Pleiku province, South Vietnam	January 15, 1969	For smothering a grenade blast with his body to protect those around him
A black and white headshot of LaPointe in a suit and tie	Joseph G. LaPointe Jr. †	Army	Specialist Four	Quảng Tín province	June 2, 1969	Sacrificed his life by using his own body as a shield in an attempt to save a wounded soldier.
	Clyde E. Lassen	Navy	Lieutenant, Junior Grade	North Vietnam	June 19, 1968	For the rescue of two downed naval aviators
—	Billy L. Lauffer †	Army	Private First Class	near Bong Son, Bình Định province	September 21, 1966	Rushed an enemy machine gun to distract the enemy so that his wounded comrades could be moved to safety
—	Robert D. Law †	Army	Specialist Four	Phước Thành province	February 22, 1969	For smothering a grenade blast with his body to protect those around him
A black and white image of Lee from the waist up in his military dress blue uniform with medals and hat. His Medal of Honor can be seen around his neck.	Howard V. Lee	Marine Corps	Captain	near Cam Lộ	August 8, 1966 – August 9, 1966	Volunteered to reinforce a squad of Marines who were under heavy fire. He assumed command and directed the defense of their position and despite being wounded by a grenade, he continued to direct them, saving many lives.
—	Milton A. Lee †	Army	Private First Class	near Phu Bai, Thừa Thiên province	April 26, 1968	Exposed himself to enemy fire and overran an enemy squad, continuing to provide cover fire until the lead element had overrun a second enemy squad and he fell mortally wounded.
—	Robert R. Leisy †	Army	Second Lieutenant	Phước Long province	December 2, 1969	Sacrificed his life to shield another soldier from a rocket blast, absorbing the full blast with his body. He continued to direct his men and refused treatment until his men were taken care of.
	Peter C. Lemon	Army	Specialist Four	Firebase Illingworth, Tây Ninh province	April 1, 1970	The only Canadian recipient since World War II, and one of only four since 1900. He received it for exposing himself to enemy gunfire multiple times. While wounded he secured a machine gun and fired on the enemy, refusing evacuation until his injured comrades were taken.
	Matthew Leonard †	Army	Platoon Sergeant	near Suoi Da, South Vietnam	February 28, 1967	After being shot in the hand by a sniper, he exposed himself to enemy gunfire and charged a machine gun, killing the enemy there. He was shot multiple times and propped himself up against a tree and continued to fire until he succumbed to his injuries.
A color image of Levitow wearing his dress military uniform with ribbons and no hat. His Medal of Honor can be seen around his neck.	John L. Levitow	Air Force	Airman First Class	Long Binh Army post, South Vietnam	February 24, 1969	For diving on top of a flare to eject it from an aircraft, saving the aircraft and the entire crew on board
	Angelo J. Liteky	Army	Captain	near Phuoc-Lac, Biên Hòa province	December 6, 1967	Was a Chaplain who carried 20 wounded men from the battlefield under heavy fire. He later renounced his medal of honor.
A colored photo of Littrell wearing his military dress uniform with ribbons and no hat. He is looking at the camera and an American flag is visible in the background.	Gary L. Littrell	Army	Sergeant First Class	Kon Tum province	April 4, 1970 – April 8, 1970	Risked his life to direct artillery and air support by day and marked the unit's location by night; despite enemy fire he led his men against the enemy until help arrived.
A black and white headshot of Livingston wearing his military dress uniform with a hat and ribbons. He is looking directly at the camera and there is an American flag in the background.	James E. Livingston	Marine Corps	Captain	Dai Do, South Vietnam	May 2, 1968	Although twice painfully wounded by grenade fragments, he refused medical treatment and courageously led his men in the destruction of over 100 mutually supporting bunkers, driving the remaining enemy from their positions, and relieving the pressure on the stranded Marine company. Also while wounded and in the open, continued to give orders to his troops to repel the enemy. He refused to be evacuated until his men were safe.
	Donald R. Long †	Army	Sergeant	South Vietnam	June 30, 1966	For smothering a grenade blast with his body to protect those around him
A black-and-white photo depicting Lozada from the waist up holding a sleepeing back in his hands, wearing a parachute and a Kevlar helmet with the letters A09 on it.	Carlos J. Lozada †	Army	Private First Class	Đắk Tô	November 20, 1967	For providing covering fire at the cost of his own life during a withdrawal
	Andre C. Lucas †	Army	Lieutenant Colonel	Fire Support Base Ripcord	July 1, 1970 – July 23, 1970	For extraordinary heroism while serving as the commanding officer of the 2d Battalion
A black and white image of a Lynch wearing a baseball hat and a jacket with his medal of honor visible around his neck.	Allen J. Lynch	Army	Specialist Four	near Mỹ An (2), Bình Định province	December 15, 1967	For providing critical aid to wounded comrades under heavy fire
Head and shoulders of an older man with thinning hair wearing a dark suit coat, white shirt, and red tie. A star-shaped medal hangs from a light blue ribbon around his neck and on his lapel is a small round blue pin.	Walter J. Marm Jr.	Army	Second Lieutenant	near Ia Drang Valley	November 14, 1965	For actions in Ia Drang, in which he led a successful one man assault on an enemy hill
A black and white image of Martini in his military dress uniform with hat	Gary W. Martini †	Marine Corps	Private First Class	Bình Sơn	April 21, 1967	Sacrificed his life to move a wounded comrade to safety
A black and white image of Maxam wearing his military dress blue uniform with hat.	Larry L. Maxam †	Marine Corps	Corporal	Cam Lộ District, Quảng Trị province	February 2, 1968	Sacrificed his life to single-handedly repel a large enemy force from attacking through a weakened perimeter for over 1½ hours.
Head and shoulders of a white man wearing a peaked cap and a military jacket with yellow buttons and four rows of ribbon bars on the left breast. A star-shaped medal is hanging from a light blue ribbon around his neck.	Finnis D. McCleery	Army	Platoon Sergeant	Quảng Tín province	May 14, 1968	Although wounded in an assault on a bunker complex, he continued attacking until wounded a second time by shrapnel eliminating the enemy from the hill
	James C. McCloughan	Army	Private First Class	Quảng Nam province	May 13, 1969–May 15, 1969	Continued to treat wounded and help repulse enemy assault although himself wounded
—	Phill G. McDonald †	Army	Private First Class	near Kon Tum City	June 7, 1968	Was killed after attacking the enemy multiple times with grenades and rifle fire
A black and white image of McGinty wearing his military dress blue uniform with medals and no hat. His Medal of Honor is visible around his neck.	John J. McGinty III	Marine Corps	Staff Sergeant	Quảng Trị province	July 18, 1966	Found a separated unit of twenty wounded men, reloaded their weapons and directed their fire at the enemy until they attempted a counter-attack. He then directed fire at the enemy and although wounded adjusted artillery and air strikes within fifty yards of his position until the enemy had been repelled.
—	Ray McKibben †	Army	Sergeant	near Song Mao, South Vietnam	December 8, 1968	Single-handedly destroyed an enemy bunker, rescued a wounded comrade from under heavy fire, and attacked and destroyed two more bunkers by himself before being mortally wounded while attacking a fourth bunker.
A black and white headshot of a young McMahon wearing a suit and tie. He is turned slightly to the right with his head down and he is smiling.	Thomas J. McMahon †	Army	Specialist Four	Quảng Tín province	March 19, 1969	While attempting to rescue three wounded soldiers despite heavy enemy fire, he was able to carry two of the men to safety but was killed while trying to rescue the third.
a colored image of an elderly McNerney in a business suit wearing his Medal of Honor around his neck. He is facing to the left.	David H. McNerney	Army	First Sergeant	Polei Doc, South Vietnam	March 22, 1967	Despite being wounded after his unit was attacked, he assumed command of the unit when the company commander was killed, organized the defense, and helped arrange a helicopter evacuation of the wounded. He refused his own medical evacuation and instead stayed with the company until a new commander arrived.
A black and white image of McWethy wearing military dress uniform with necktie and hat. He is wearing glasses and smiling at the camera.	Edgar L. McWethy Jr. †	Army	Specialist Five	Bình Định province	June 21, 1967	Repeatedly exposed himself to enemy fire to treat his wounded comrades despite being wounded three times himself and continued to help his fellow soldiers until suffering a fourth and fatal wound.
A black and white image of Michael wearing his military dress uniform with hat and necktie.	Don L. Michael †	Army	Specialist Four	South Vietnam	April 8, 1967	Single-handedly destroyed a Viet Cong bunker and was then killed while chasing the retreating enemy soldiers.
—	Franklin D. Miller	Army	Staff Sergeant	Kon Tum province	January 5, 1970	He single-handedly held off an enemy assault, arranged for a helicopter extraction of his unit, and again fought off the enemy alone until relief arrived, although wounded himself.
	Gary L. Miller †	Army	First Lieutenant	Bình Dương province	February 16, 1969	For smothering a grenade blast with his body to protect those around him
alt=A black-and-white photo of Modrzejewski from the waist up in his military dress blue uniform with hat and medals. There is an American flag and a Marine Corps flag in the background and his Medal of Honor is around his neck.	Robert J. Modrzejewski	Marine Corps	Captain	South Vietnam	July 15, 1966 – July 18, 1966	Led his men in the seizure of enemy ammunition and supplies and continued to counterattack the enemy using artillery fire and air support.
	Ferenc Zoltán Molnár †	Army	Staff Sergeant	Kon Tum province	May 20, 1967	For smothering a grenade blast with his body to protect those around him
A black and white headshot image of Monroe in a suit and tie with glasses and no hat.	James H. Monroe †	Army	Private First Class	Bồng Sơn, Hoài Nhơn District	February 16, 1967	For smothering a grenade blast with his body to protect those around him
A black and white headshot image of Morgan in a suit and tie with no hat.	William D. Morgan †	Marine Corps	Corporal	Quảng Trị province	February 25, 1969	For creating a diversion at the expense of his own life and providing his squad time to evacuate two wounded soldiers
A black and white image of Morris from the chest up in his military dress uniform with ribbons. He has no hat and there is an American flag in the background.	Charles B. Morris	Army	Sergeant	South Vietnam	June 29, 1966	Continued to lead his squad, fight the enemy, and help the wounded despite being wounded himself four separate times.
	Melvin Morris	Army	Staff Sergeant	near Chi Lăng	September 17, 1969	For his courageous actions while serving as Commander of a Strike Force drawn from Company D, 5th Special Forces Group (Airborne), 1st Special Forces, during combat operations against an armed enemy.
—	Robert C. Murray †	Army	Staff Sergeant	near Hiệp Đức	June 7, 1970	For smothering a grenade blast with his body to protect those around him
—	David P. Nash †	Army	Private First Class	Giao Duc District, Dinh Tuong province	December 29, 1968	For covering a grenade with his body in order to protect those around him
—	Hugh R. Nelson Jr. †	Army	Captain	Mộc Hóa district	June 5, 1966	For rescuing and covering his wounded crew with his body
A black-and-white photo of Newlin from the waist up in his military dress blue uniform with hat.	Melvin E. Newlin †	Marine Corps	Private First Class	Quảng Nam province	July 4, 1967	Killed while single-handedly attacking an enemy force, breaking up and disorganizing the enemy
A black and white headshot photo of Noonan in his military dress blue uniform with hat.	Thomas P. Noonan Jr. †	Marine Corps	Lance Corporal	near Vandegrift Combat Base, Quảng Trị province	February 5, 1969	Killed while attempting to rescue a wounded man
Head and shoulders of an older white man with a large scar above his left eyebrow. He is wearing a dark suit coat with an American flag pin on the lapel and a star-shaped medal hangs from a light blue ribbon around his neck.	Thomas R. Norris	Navy	Lieutenant	Quảng Trị province	April 10, 1972 – April 13, 1972	Rescued two downed pilots deep within heavily controlled enemy territory
A black and white image showing the head and torso of Novosel in his military dress uniform with ribbons. His Medal of Honor is visible around his neck.	Michael J. Novosel	Army	Chief Warrant Officer	Kien Tuong province	October 2, 1969	For the rescue of 29 American and South Vietnamese soldiers from a heavily fortified enemy training area without any cover or gunship support.
A black and white image showing Olive from the waist up in his combat uniform with kevlar helmet and holding a parachute.	Milton L. Olive, III †	Army	Private First Class	Phu Cuong	October 22, 1965	For smothering a grenade blast with his body. The first African American Medal of Honor recipient of the Vietnam War.
A black and white portrait picture of a Kenneth in his formals with one chevron on his shoulder.	Kenneth L. Olson †	Army	Specialist Four	Long An	May 13, 1968	For smothering a grenade blast with his body
Head and shoulders of a white man with a pointed mustache, wearing a star-shaped medal on a blue ribbon around his neck.	Robert E. O'Malley	Marine Corps	Corporal	near An Cu'ong 2, South Vietnam	August 18, 1965	Risked his life and led his men to repeatedly attack the enemy, assist another Marine unit that had inflicted heavy casualties and led his unit to a helicopter for evacuation.
—	David G. Ouellet †	Navy	Seaman	Mekong River	March 6, 1967	Placed himself between an enemy grenade and his shipmates, absorbing most of the blast fragments with his own body in order to protect his shipmates from injury and death.
A gray-haired white man wearing a formal military uniform with a star-shaped medal hanging from a ribbon around his neck	Robert M. Patterson	Army	Specialist Four	near La Chu, Thừa Thiên province	May 6, 1968	During a firefight he single-handedly destroyed a series of enemy bunkers
A black and white headshot of Paul facing slightly to the left and wearing his military dress blue uniform with hat.	Joe C. Paul †	Marine Corps	Lance Corporal	near Chu Lai	August 18, 1965	Killed while defending his wounded comrades from the enemy and delivered effective suppressive fire in order to divert the Viet Cong long enough to allow the casualties to be evacuated.
A color image showing Penry from the waist up in his military dress uniform with ribbons. His Medal of Honor is visible around his neck.	Richard A. Penry	Army	Sergeant	Bình Tuy province	January 31, 1970	Helped to organize defenses and repeatedly exposed himself to enemy fire to retrieve supplies and return fire. Voluntarily left the perimeter, set up a guiding beacon, established the priorities for evacuation and successively carried 18 wounded men to the extraction site. After all wounded had been evacuated he joined another platoon and assisted in pursuing the enemy.
A black and white image showing Perkins head and upper torso in his military dress uniform with hat.	William T. Perkins Jr. †	Marine Corps	Corporal	Quảng Trị province	October 12, 1967	Sacrificed himself by smothering an enemy grenade with his body to save the lives of three fellow Marines and is the only combat photographer to have received the Medal of Honor.
A black and white image showing the head and upper torso of Peters wearing his military dress uniform with ribbons.	Lawrence D. Peters †	Marine Corps	Sergeant	Quảng Tín province	September 4, 1967	After being struck by enemy mortar, machine gun, and small arms fire he continuously fought and led his men against the enemy until dying from his wounds.
—	Danny J. Petersen †	Army	Specialist Four	Tây Ninh province	January 9, 1970	Repeatedly exposed himself and his armored personnel carrier to enemy fire in order to protect the other soldiers of his unit and after his vehicle was disabled, he stayed behind and was killed while providing covering fire so others could withdraw.
A black and white headshot image of Phipps wearing his military dress uniform with hat.	Jimmy W. Phipps †	Marine Corps	Private First Class	near An Hoa Combat Base	May 27, 1969	Sacrificed himself to save others by smothering an enemy grenade with his body
A black and white image showing the head and upper torso of Pierce in his military uniform with hat.	Larry S. Pierce †	Army	Sergeant	near Bến Cát	September 20, 1965	Sacrificed himself to save others by smothering an enemy grenade with his body
	William H. Pitsenbarger †	Air Force	Airman First Class	near Cẩm Mỹ	April 11, 1966	For refusing evacuation while tending wounded and defending the unit's position. Originally awarded the Air Force Cross, was upgraded to Medal of Honor by Congress in 2000, after review of his actions.
A black and white image showing the head and torso if Pittman wearing his Marine Corps dress uniform with medals. His Medal of Honor is visible around his neck.	Richard A. Pittman	Marine Corps	Lance Corporal	near the Demilitarized Zone	July 24, 1966	Risked his life to assist a group of Marines who had been attacked by a larger enemy force
A color image showing the head and shoulders of Pitts. He is wearing his military dress uniform and there is an American flag in the background.	Riley L. Pitts †	Army	Captain	Ap Dong	October 31, 1967	Killed after attacking an enemy force with rifle fire and grenades. Was the first African American commissioned officer to be awarded the Medal of Honor.
A black and white image of Pless wearing his military dress uniform with hat and medals. His Medal of Honor is visible around his neck and there is an American flag in the background.	Stephen W. Pless	Marine Corps	Captain	near Quảng Ngãi	August 19, 1967	For rescuing a group of surrounded American troops with his helicopter
—	William D. Port †	Army	Private First Class	Que Son Valley, Quảng Tín province	January 12, 1968	Rescued a wounded comrade and then smothered the blast of an enemy-thrown grenade with his body to protect other soldiers. He survived the blast, but was seriously wounded and captured by the enemy dying while a prisoner of war ten months later.
—	Robert L. Poxon †	Army	First Lieutenant	Tây Ninh province	June 2, 1969	Was wounded when attempting to rescue a wounded soldier and despite his injuries, led his platoon and succeeded in destroying an enemy bunker before being killed.
A black and white image showing the head and shoulders of Pless in his Marine Corps dress uniform with hat.	William R. Prom †	Marine Corps	Lance Corporal	near An Hoa Combat Base	February 9, 1969	Sacrificed his life to direct fire at the enemy at point blank range
—	Robert J. Pruden †	Army	Staff Sergeant	Quảng Ngãi province	November 29, 1969	Sacrificed himself to ensure evacuation helicopters were able to withdraw his team.
Head and shoulders of a white man wearing a T-shirt and a military jacket, unbuttoned at the collar, with the word "Rabel" on his right breast and "U.S. Army" on his left. He has on a beret and is holding a rifle over his shoulder by its barrel.	Laszlo Rabel †	Army	Staff Sergeant	Bình Định province	November 13, 1968	For falling on a grenade to save his comrades
A color image showing Rascon from the waist up in his military dress uniform with ribbons. His Medal of Honor is visible around his neck and an American flag is visible in the background.	Alfred V. Rascon	Army	Specialist Four	South Vietnam	March 16, 1966	Specialist Rascon's showed extraordinary valor in the face of deadly enemy fire, heroism in rescuing the wounded, and gallantry by repeatedly risking his own life for his fellow soldiers.
A black and white image of Ray in his military uniform with hat. His head is ducked down slightly and he is smiling at the camera.	David R. Ray †	Navy	Hospital Corpsman Second Class	Quảng Nam province	March 19, 1969	For gallantry and intrepidity in defending his position and giving aid to wounded Marines
	Ronald E. Ray	Army	First Lieutenant	Ia Drang Valley	June 19, 1966	For eliminating enemy fire with available weapons and shielding his men from an enemy grenade
A black and white image showing the head and shoulders of Reasoner in his military dress uniform.	Frank S. Reasoner †	Marine Corps	First Lieutenant	near Da Nang	July 12, 1965	For attempting to rescue one of his wounded men on a Marine recon patrol
	Terry P. Richardson	Army	Staff Sergeant	north of Lộc Ninh, South Vietnam	September 14, 1968	Recovering wounded soldiers and directing air strikes under heavy fire
	John Ripley (USMC)	Marine Corps	Captain	Đông Hà, South Vietnam	April 2, 1972	For destroying the Đông Hà Bridge during the Easter Offensive. Originally awarded the Navy Cross this was upgraded to the Medal of Honor on 3 March 2026, 18 years after his death.
—	Anund C. Roark †	Army	Sergeant	Kon Tum province	May 16, 1968	Sacrificed his life to save his fellow soldiers by smothering a grenade with his body
A color image of Roberts wearing his Army Green Uniform. There is an American flag and a Medal of Honor flag in the background.	Gordon R. Roberts	Army	Specialist Four	Thừa Thiên province	July 11, 1969	For efforts in retrieving wounded personnel and defending his platoon
—	James W. Robinson Jr. †	Army	Sergeant	South Vietnam	April 11, 1966	Sacrificed his life to destroy an enemy bunker and protect several of his fellow soldiers
A black and white image showing the head and shoulders of Rocco in his military dress uniform with ribbons.	Louis R. Rocco	Army	Sergeant First Class	northeast of Katum	May 24, 1970	Distinguished himself when he volunteered to accompany a medical evacuation team on an urgent mission to evacuate eight critically wounded Army of the Republic of Vietnam personnel.
	Jose Rodela	Army	Sergeant First Class	Phước Long province	September 1, 1969	Repeatedly exposed himself to enemy fire to attend to the fallen and eliminate an enemy rocket position.
A black and white image showing Rogers form the waist up in his military uniform with ribbons. His Medal of Honor can be seen around his neck.	Charles C. Rogers	Army	Lieutenant Colonel	Fishhook, near Cambodian border	November 1, 1968	Risked his life to repel the enemy and protect his soldiers during an enemy assault on his firebase.
A color image showing 2nd Lieutenant Gary M. Rose from the chest up in his military uniform with ribbons.	Gary M. Rose	Army	Captain	Chavan, Laos	September 11, 1970 – September 14, 1970	Risked his life to treat 60–70 personnel, despite being wounded multiple times during Operation Tailwind.
	Eurípides Rubio †	Army	Captain	Tây Ninh province	November 8, 1966	For efforts in directing an air strike on enemy forces
A color showing Sabo from the waist up in his military uniform with hat.	Leslie H. Sabo Jr. †	Army	Specialist Four	Near Se San Village, Cambodia	May 10, 1970	For heroic action when his platoon was ambushed by North Vietnamese forces near the village of Se San in eastern Cambodia.
A black and white image showing Hector from the waist up in his military combat uniform with kevlar helmet. His hands are on his hips and he is smiling at the camera.	Héctor Santiago-Colón †	Army	Specialist Four	Quảng Trị province	June 28, 1968	For falling on a grenade to save his comrades and is one of five Puerto Ricans who have been posthumously presented with the Medal of Honor.
—	Ruppert L. Sargent †	Army	First Lieutenant	Hậu Nghĩa province	March 15, 1967	On that day, while in Hậu Nghĩa province in the Republic of Vietnam, Sargent threw himself on two enemy hand grenades, sacrificing himself but saving the lives of two men nearby.
A black and white image showing the head and upper torso of Sasser wearing his military dress uniform with ribbons.	Clarence E. Sasser	Army	Private First Class	Dinh Tuong province	January 10, 1968	Risked his life to save several wounded soldiers and although severely wounded himself continued treating their wounds for five hours until they were rescued.
A black and white image showing the head and upper torso of Sasser wearing his military dress uniform with ribbons.	William W. Seay †	Army	Sergeant	near Ap Nhi	August 25, 1968	When his convoy came under attack that day, near Ap Nhi in the Republic of Vietnam, Seay twice left his protective cover to toss enemy-thrown hand grenades back at the North Vietnamese forces. Despite being wounded in the wrist, he again exposed himself to enemy fire and was fatally shot.
A black and white head shot of Shea in his military dress uniform with hat.	Daniel J. Shea †	Army	Private First Class	Quảng Trị province	May 14, 1969	Killed by enemy gunfire after assisting in the defeat of an attacking enemy force
	Marvin G. Shields †	Navy	Construction Mechanic Third Class	Đồng Xoài	June 10, 1965	Killed after rescuing several wounded, assisting in destroying an enemy gun emplacement and resupplying ammunition to his unit
A black and white image showing the head and upper torso of Sijan wearing his military dress uniform with ribbons.	Lance P. Sijan †	Air Force	Captain	North Vietnam	November 9, 1967	For actions as a prisoner of war from November 9, 1967 – January 22, 1968
—	Clifford C. Sims †	Army	Staff Sergeant	near Huế	February 21, 1968	Sims threw himself onto a triggered booby-trap device. He was killed in the ensuing explosion, but was successful in protecting the members of his squad.
A black and white head shot of Singleton wearing his military dress uniform with hat.	Walter K. Singleton †	Marine Corps	Sergeant	Gio Linh District, Quảng Trị province	March 24, 1967	Killed in an attack where he killed eight of the enemy and drove the remainder away
Head of a solemn-faced young man with short hair wearing a dark military jacket with pins on the lapels over a shirt and tie.	George K. Sisler †	Army	First Lieutenant	South Vietnam	February 7, 1967	Organized the defense, rescued a wounded soldier, and single-handedly attacked an enemy position before being killed
—	Donald S. Skidgel †	Army	Sergeant	near Sông Bé	September 14, 1969	Killed attempting to draw enemy fire away from his convoy after manning a machine gun in his vehicle
	Donald P. Sloat †	Army	Specialist Four	Quảng Tín province	January 17, 1970	Killed using his body to shield comrades from a grenade blast
A black and white head shot image showing Smedley in his military dress uniform with hat.	Larry E. Smedley †	Marine Corps	Corporal	Quảng Nam province	December 21, 1967	Assaulted the enemy with grenades and rifle fire until dying from his wounds
A black and white head shot image of Smith wearing his military dress uniform.	Elmelindo R. Smith †	Army	Staff Sergeant	South Vietnam	February 16, 1967	Although wounded by a rocket he led his platoon in a patrol when enemy forces attacked with machine gun, mortars and rocket fire.
	James M. Sprayberry	Army	First Lieutenant	South Vietnam	April 25, 1968	Led a patrol which rescued men who had been wounded and cut off from the rest of the company and in the process destroyed several enemy bunkers and machine gun emplacements.
—	Russell A. Steindam †	Army	First Lieutenant	Tây Ninh province	February 1, 1970	For defending company from an enemy grenade
—	Jimmy G. Stewart †	Army	Staff Sergeant	South Vietnam	May 18, 1966	Sacrificed himself to hold his company's position against the enemy allowing others to come to his aid and repel the enemy force
A color image of showing the head and upper torso of Stockdale wearing his military dress uniform with medals. His Medal of Honor can be seen around his neck.	James B. Stockdale	Navy	Captain	Hỏa Lò Prison, Hanoi, North Vietnam	September 4, 1969	For action as a prisoner of war
—	Lester R. Stone Jr. †	Army	Sergeant	west of Landing Zone Liz	March 3, 1969	Sacrificed his life by manning a machine gun in an exposed position during an enemy attack, allowing others to rescue a wounded comrade
—	Mitchell W. Stout †	Army	Sergeant	Khe Gio Bridge	March 12, 1970	Sacrificed his life to save others by smothering a grenade with his body
—	Robert F. Stryker †	Army	Specialist Four	near Lộc Ninh	November 7, 1967	Sacrificed his life to save several fellow soldiers by smothering a claymore mine with his body
Head of a man in military dress uniform, wearing a bow tie over a white jacket. Medal of Honor around his neck and other medal ribb0ns on his chest	Kenneth E. Stumpf	Army	Specialist Four	near Đức Phổ	April 25, 1967	Risked his life by rescuing three injured squad members and then led his squad to attack and destroy a heavily fortified enemy bunker complex.
Head of a young man with neatly combed hair wearing, over a shirt and tie, a military jacket with a braided cord over his right shoulder.	Jon E. Swanson †	Army	Captain	Cambodia	February 26, 1971	Sacrificed his life by flying his aircraft dangerously slow and low to destroy enemy machine gun emplacements until his aircraft was shot down.
	James A. Taylor	Army	First Lieutenant	west of Quế Sơn	November 9, 1967	Risked his life to save the lives of a number of his fellow soldiers
A black and white image showing the head and upper torso of Taylor in his military dress uniform with ribbons and hat.	Karl G. Taylor Sr. †	Marine Corps	Staff Sergeant	Dodge City, Quảng Nam province	December 8, 1968	Sacrificed his life to save the lives of several Marines by taking out an enemy bunker
	Larry Taylor	Army	First Lieutenant	Bình Dương province	June 12, 1969	AH-1 Cobra pilot who rescued four soldiers under enemy fire
Head and torso of a man with dark hair, a full, graying beard, and wire-framed glasses. His arms are loosely crossed, he is wearing a dark suit coat, and a star–shaped medal hangs from a light blue ribbon around his neck.	Brian M. Thacker	Army	First Lieutenant	Kon Tum province	March 31, 1971	Risked his own life to allow his unit to escape
A color image showing Thornton from the waist up in a business suit. He is wearing his Medal of Honor around his neck, with his left hand over his heart.	Michael E. Thornton	Navy	Engineman Second Class	Quảng Trị province	October 31, 1972	Saved the life of his superior officer and allowed the other members of his patrol to escape
A color image showing the head and upper torso of Thorsness wearing his military dress uniform with ribbons. His Medal of Honor can be seen around his neck.	Leo K. Thorsness	Air Force	Major	over North Vietnam	April 19, 1967	Risked his life to assist in the rescue of three downed aviators
A black-and-white photo of the upper torso of Jay Vargas wearing his military dress uniform with hat and medals	Jay R. Vargas	Marine Corps	Captain	Dai Do	April 30, 1968 – May 2, 1968	Vargas requested that his mother's name, M. Sando Vargas Jr., be engraved on the medal and added to the rolls.
A black-and-white photo of Humbert Versace wearing his military uniform. Two military badges are clearly visible on the left breast pocket.	Humbert R. Versace †	Army	Captain	Cà Mau	October 29, 1963 – September 26, 1965	Was executed by the Viet Cong while a prisoner of war after repeated escape attempts, torture and maltreatment
A black and white head shot image of Warren in his military dress uniform with hat.	John E. Warren Jr. †	Army	First Lieutenant	Tây Ninh province	January 14, 1969	Sacrificed his life by smothering a grenade with his body
Head and shoulders of a middle-aged man with closely cropped hair and horn-rimmed glasses. He is wearing a dark military jacket with a parachute badge on the left breast and a Christian cross under a "U.S." pin on each lapel.	Charles J. Watters †	Army	Major	Battle of Dak To	November 19, 1967	Was a chaplain who sacrificed himself to rescue several wounded men
—	Dale E. Wayrynen †	Army	Specialist Four	Quảng Ngãi province	May 18, 1967	For smothering a grenade blast with his body to protect those around him
A black and white image showing the head and upper torso of Weber wearing his military dress uniform with hat.	Lester W. Weber †	Marine Corps	Lance Corporal	Quảng Nam province	February 23, 1969	After fighting back four enemy soldiers and causing 11 others to retreat was killed by a fifth enemy soldier
	Gary G. Wetzel	Army	Private First Class	near Ap Dong An	January 8, 1968	Although losing his arm and repeatedly losing consciousness from loss of blood after the helicopter he was on was shot down he fought back an enemy gun emplacement and assisted in the rescue of a fallen officer.
A black and white image showing the head and upper torso of Wheat wearing his military dress uniform with hat.	Roy M. Wheat †	Marine Corps	Lance Corporal	Dien Ban District, Quảng Nam province	August 11, 1967	Sacrificed his life by smothering a mine with his body
A black and white image showing the head and upper torso of Wickam wearing his military dress uniform with hat.	Jerry W. Wickam †	Army	Corporal	near Lộc Ninh	January 6, 1968	Killed after repeatedly attacking and defeating the enemy
A black and white head shot image of Wilbanks wearing his military dress uniform.	Hilliard A. Wilbanks †	Air Force	Captain	near Da Lat	February 24, 1967	Distinguished himself by realizing that Army Rangers were walking into an ambush and, with no air support close by and no radio communication with the Rangers, he sacrificed his life to alert the Rangers of the danger.
—	Louis E. Willett †	Army	Private First Class	Kon Tum province	February 15, 1967	For twice providing covering fire for his squad's withdrawal despite heavy enemy fire
—	Charles Q. Williams	Army	Second Lieutenant	Đồng Xoài	June 9, 1965 – June 10, 1965	After a group of enemy insurgents attacked he organized a defense and repelled the enemy throughout the night
A black and white image showing the head and upper torso of Williams wearing his military dress uniform with hat.	Dewayne T. Williams †	Marine Corps	Private First Class	Quảng Nam province	September 18, 1968	Sacrificed his life by smothering a grenade with his body
A black and white image showing the head and upper torso of Williams wearing his military dress uniform with hat and ribbons. An American flag is visible in the background	James E. Williams	Navy	Boatswain's Mate First Class	Mekong River	October 31, 1966	Against overwhelming odds, several times Williams led his PBRs (Patrol Boats, River) against concentrations of enemy junks and sampans. As a result of the three-hour battle, the American naval force killed numerous Viet Cong guerrillas, destroyed over fifty vessels, and disrupted a major enemy logistic operation.
A black and white image of Wilson wearing his Marine Corps dress blue uniform with White dress hat.	Alfred M. Wilson †	Marine Corps	Private First Class	Quảng Trị province	March 3, 1969	Sacrificed his life by smothering a grenade with his body
A black and white image of Winder wearing a suit. He has glasses and is looking to the left.	David F. Winder †	Army	Private First Class	South Vietnam	May 13, 1970	Sacrificed his life in an attempt to assist a wounded soldier
A black and white headshot of Worley wearing his combat uniform with Kevlar helmet.	Kenneth L. Worley †	Marine Corps	Lance Corporal	Bo Ban, Quảng Nam province	August 12, 1968	Sacrificed his life by smothering a grenade with his body
	Raymond R. Wright	Army	Specialist Four	Ap Bac Zone	May 2, 1967	Along with another soldier attacked and defeated multiple enemy bunkers
	Maximo Yabes †	Army	First Sergeant	near Phu Hoa Dong	February 26, 1967	Used his body as a shield to protect others in a bunker, moved two wounded men to a safer position where they could be given medical treatment and destroyed an enemy machine gun position before being killed.
A black and white headshot of Yano wearing a sweater and shirt and tie. He is facing the camera and smiling.	Rodney J. T. Yano †	Army	Sergeant First Class	near Biên Hòa	January 1, 1969	For sacrificing his life to save the other members of his aircrew
—	Gordon D. Yntema †	Army	Sergeant	near Thăng Bình	January 16, 1968 – January 18, 1968	Defended several fallen comrades and forced the Vietnamese to kill him rather than be captured.
	Gerald O. Young	Air Force	Captain	Khe Sanh	November 9, 1967	Distinguished himself while serving as a helicopter rescue crew commander
—	Marvin R. Young †	Army	Staff Sergeant	near Bến Củi	August 21, 1968	For sacrificing his life so his unit could escape
—	Fred W. Zabitosky	Army	Staff Sergeant		February 19, 1968	Zabitosky directed the defense until rescue helicopters arrived, and when the helicopter that was to extract him from the battlefield crashed, he ignored his own injuries to save the downed craft's pilot.

== Unknown soldier ==
The unknown soldier from the Vietnam War who was buried in the Tomb of the Unknowns was authorized a Medal of Honor and in 1998 was identified as 1st Lieutenant Michael Blassie, USAF. After DNA testing confirmed his identity, the remains were removed from the tomb and returned to Blassie's family, but the Medal of Honor did not transfer with him. It remains awarded to "the unknown soldier" as a tribute to the war dead who have not yet been identified. The Blassie family requested that the Medal of Honor be granted to him but the request was denied by the Department of Defense.

== See also ==
- List of Medal of Honor recipients
