= Ardie R. Copas =

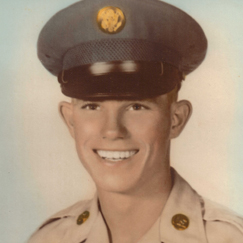
- Copas during his time of service
- Born: August 29, 1950; Fort Pierce, Florida, U.S.
- Died: May 12, 1970 (aged 19); Romeas Haek, Cambodia
- Burial place: Hillcrest Memorial Gardens, Fort Pierce, Florida
- Military career
- Allegiance: United States
- Branch: United States Army
- Service years: 1969–1970
- Rank: Specialist 4
- Units: Company C, 1st Battalion, 5th Infantry Regiment, 25th Infantry Division
- Conflicts: Vietnam War †
- Awards: Medal of Honor; Bronze Star Medal (2); Purple Heart

Ardie Ray Copas (29 August 1950 – 12 May 1970) was a U.S. Army veteran of the Vietnam war, and a recipient of the Medal of Honor.

== Biography ==
Copas was born in Fort Pierce, Florida. He joined the U.S. Army on June 18, 1969. During the Vietnam War, he was killed in Romeas Haek, Cambodia, for which his Distinguished Service Cross was posthumously upgraded to the Congressional Medal of Honor.

== Medal of Honor ==
U.S. Army Specialist 4 Ardie R. Copas distinguished himself on May 12, 1970, while serving as a machine gunner near Ph Romeas Hek, Cambodia. When his convoy was ambushed, Copas repelled the enemy under heavy fire, holding his post while his wounded comrades were evacuated. Copas was killed in action.

Copas' daughter, Shyrell Jean Copas, accepted the Medal of Honor on his behalf at a White House ceremony on March 18, 2014.

Copas' daughter accepted the Medal of Honor from Barack Obama in 2014

The award came through the Defense Authorization Act which called for a review of Jewish American and Hispanic American veterans from World War II, the Korean War and the Vietnam War to ensure that no prejudice was shown to those deserving the Medal of Honor.

== Medal of Honor Citation ==

The President of the United States of America, authorized by Act of Congress, July 9, 1918 (amended by act of July 25, 1963), takes pride in presenting the Medal of Honor (posthumously) to:

ARDIE R. COPAS
United States Army

For conspicuous gallantry and intrepidity at the risk of his life above and beyond the call of duty:

Specialist Four Ardie R. Copas distinguished himself by acts of gallantry and intrepidity above and beyond the call of duty while serving as a Machinegunner in Company C, 1st Battalion (Mechanized), 5th Infantry Regiment, 25th Infantry Division during combat operations against an armed enemy near Ph Romeas Hek, Cambodia on May 12, 1970. That morning, Specialist Four Copas’ company was suddenly attacked by a large hostile force firing recoilless rifles, rocket-propelled grenades, and automatic weapons. As Specialist Four Copas began returning fire, his armored car was struck by an enemy recoilless round, knocking him to the ground and injuring four American Soldiers beside the vehicle. Ignoring his own wounds, Specialist Four Copas quickly remounted the burning vehicle and commenced firing his machinegun at the belligerents. Braving the hostile fire directed at him and the possible detonation of the mortar rounds inside the track, Specialist Four Copas maintained a heavy volume of suppressive fire on the foe while the wounded Americans were safely evacuated. Undaunted, Specialist Four Copas continued to place devastating volleys of fire upon the adversary until he was mortally wounded when another enemy round hit his vehicle. Specialist Four Copas’ daring action resulted in the safe evacuation of his comrades. Specialist Four Copas’ extraordinary heroism and selflessness at the cost of his own life, above and beyond the call of duty, are in keeping with the highest traditions of military service and reflect great credit upon himself, his unit and the United States Army.

== Other honors and decorations ==
In addition to the Medal of Honor, Copas received the Bronze Star Medal with one Bronze Oak Leaf Cluster, Purple Heart, Army Good Conduct Medal, National Defense Service Medal, Vietnam Service Medal with two Bronze Service Stars, Combat Infantryman Badge, Expert Marksmanship Badge with Auto Rifle Bar, Republic of Vietnam Military Merit Medal, Republic of Vietnam Gallantry Cross with Palm Device, Republic of Vietnam Campaign Medal with "60" Device, Republic of Vietnam Gallantry Cross Unit Citation with Palm Device, Republic of Vietnam Civil Actions Honor Medal Unit Citation, First Class.

== See also ==
- List of Medal of Honor recipients for the Vietnam War
