= Kenneth L. Olson =

American soldier (1945–1968)

Kenneth Lee Olson
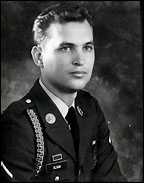
- Ken Olson as a private
- Born: May 26, 1945; Willmar, Minnesota, US
- Died: May 13, 1968 (aged 22); Long An, Republic of Vietnam
- Burial place: Paynesville Cemetery, Paynesville, Minnesota
- Military career
- Allegiance: United States
- Branch: United States Army
- Service years: 1967–1968
- Rank: Specialist Four
- Units: 12th Infantry Regiment, 199th Light Infantry Brigade
- Conflicts: Vietnam War †
- Awards: Medal of Honor; Purple Heart

Kenneth Lee Olson (May 26, 1945 – May 13, 1968) was a United States Army soldier and a posthumous recipient of the United States military's highest decoration, the Medal of Honor. He received the award for sacrificing his own life during the Vietnam War by throwing himself over an activated hand grenade, saving the lives of fellow soldiers around him.

== Biography ==
Olson joined the Army from Minneapolis, Minnesota in 1967, and by May 13, 1968, was serving as a specialist four in Company A, 5th Battalion, 12th Infantry Regiment, 199th Light Infantry Brigade (Separate). During a firefight on that day, during Operation Toan Thang I, Olson was about to toss a hand grenade at an enemy position when he was wounded, causing him to drop the activated grenade. He then threw himself on the grenade, sacrificing his life to protect his fellow soldiers from the blast.

Olson, aged 22 at his death, was buried in Paynesville Cemetery, Paynesville, Minnesota.

== Medal of Honor citation ==
Specialist Olson's official Medal of Honor citation reads:

For conspicuous gallantry and intrepidity in action at the risk of his life above and beyond the call of duty. Spec. Olson distinguished himself at the cost of his life while serving as a team leader with Company A. Spec. Olson was participating in a mission to reinforce a reconnaissance platoon which was heavily engaged with a well-entrenched Viet Cong force. When his platoon moved into the area of contact and had overrun the first line of enemy bunkers, Spec. Olson and a fellow soldier moved forward of the platoon to investigate another suspected line of bunkers. As the 2 men advanced they were pinned down by intense automatic weapons fire from an enemy position 10 meters to their front. With complete disregard for his safety, Spec. Olson exposed himself and hurled a hand grenade into the Viet Cong position. Failing to silence the hostile fire, he again exposed himself to the intense fire in preparation to assault the enemy position. As he prepared to hurl the grenade, he was wounded, causing him to drop the activated device within his own position. Realizing that it would explode immediately, Spec. Olson threw himself upon the grenade and pulled it in to his body to take the full force of the explosion. By this unselfish action Spec. Olson sacrificed his own life to save the lives of his fellow comrades-in-arms. His extraordinary heroism inspired his fellow soldiers to renew their efforts and totally defeat the enemy force. Spec. Olson's profound courage and intrepidity were in keeping with the highest traditions of the military service and reflect great credit upon himself, his unit, and the U.S. Army.

== See also ==
- List of Medal of Honor recipients
- List of Medal of Honor recipients for the Vietnam War
