= Leonard L. Alvarado =

U.S. Medal of Honor recipient

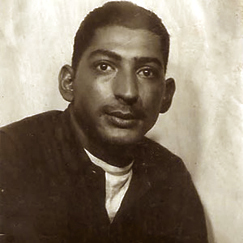
- Born: February 13, 1947; Bakersfield, California, U.S.
- Died: August 12, 1969 (aged 22); Phuoc Long Province, South Vietnam
- Burial place: Greenlawn Cemetery and Mortuary, Bakersfield, California
- Military career
- Allegiance: United States
- Branch: United States Army
- Service years: 1968–1969
- Rank: Specialist 4
- Units: Company D, 2nd Battalion; 12th Cavalry Regiment; 1st Cavalry Division (Airmobile)
- Conflicts: Vietnam War (DOW)
- Awards: Medal of Honor; Bronze Star Medal; Purple Heart; Air Medal

Leonard Louis Alvarado (February 13, 1947 – August 12, 1969) was a U.S. Army posthumous recipient of the Medal of Honor during the Vietnam War.

Alvarado joined the Army in 1968 and served as a specialist four. While on an exercise to rescue a trapped American platoon in Phuoc Long Province, Alvarado's company was attacked by the besiegers, and it was pinned down. Alvarado was wounded several times, but took out several enemy gun positions. While in the process of covering suppressing fire, Alvarado died of his wounds. He was awarded a posthumous Medal of Honor in 2014.

== Biography ==
Alvarado was born in Bakersfield, California on February 13, 1947, and enlisted in the U. S. Army on July 25, 1968, serving in the Vietnam War. He was killed in action, leaving behind his wife and a young daughter.

== Medal of Honor ==
Alvarado's daughter Lenora accepted the Medal of Honor on his behalf in 2014

On August 12, 1969, Alvarado distinguished himself while serving as a rifleman during a mission to relieve a sister platoon, in Phuoc Long Province, Vietnam. He was killed in action after disrupting an enemy raid and saving the lives of several comrades.

Alvarado's daughter, Lenora, accepted the Medal of Honor on his behalf from President Barack Obama at a White House ceremony on March 18, 2014.

The award came through the Defense Authorization Act which called for a review of Jewish American and Hispanic American veterans from World War II, the Korean War and the Vietnam War to ensure that no prejudice was shown to those deserving the Medal of Honor.

== Medal of Honor Citation ==
For conspicuous gallantry and intrepidity at the risk of his life above and beyond the call of duty:

Specialist Four Leonard L. Alvarado distinguished himself by acts of gallantry and intrepidity above and beyond the call of duty while serving as a Rifleman with Company D, 2d Battalion, 12th Cavalry, 1st Cavalry Division (Airmobile) during combat operations against an armed enemy in Phuoc Long Province, Republic of Vietnam on August 12, 1969. On that day, as Specialist Four Alvarado and a small reaction force moved through dense jungle en route to a beleaguered friendly platoon, Specialist Four Alvarado detected enemy movement and opened fire. Despite his quick reaction, Specialist Four Alvarado and his comrades were soon pinned down by the hostile force that blocked the path to the trapped platoon. Specialist Four Alvarado quickly moved forward through the hostile machinegun fire in order to engage the enemy troops. Suddenly, an enemy grenade exploded nearby, wounding and momentarily stunning him. Retaliating immediately, he killed the grenadier just as another enemy barrage wounded him again. Specialist Four Alvarado crawled forward through the fusillade to pull several comrades back within the hastily-formed perimeter. Realizing his element needed to break away from the hostile force, Specialist Four Alvarado began maneuvering forward alone. Though repeatedly thrown to the ground by exploding satchel charges, he continued advancing and firing, silencing several emplacements, including one enemy machinegun position. From his dangerous forward position, he persistently laid suppressive fire on the hostile forces, and after the enemy troops had broken contact, his comrades discovered that he had succumbed to his wounds. Specialist Four Alvarado's extraordinary heroism and selflessness at the cost of his own life, above and beyond the call of duty, are in keeping with the highest traditions of military service and reflect great credit upon himself, his unit and the United States Army.

== Other awards and decorations ==
SPC4 Alvarado received the following awards for his service.

Badge	Combat Infantryman Badge		
1st row	Medal of Honor	Bronze Star Medal	Purple Heart
2nd row	Air Medal	Army Commendation Medal with "V" Device	Army Good Conduct Medal
3rd row	National Defense Service Medal	Vietnam Service Medal with 3 Campaign stars	Vietnam Campaign Medal
Unit awards	Valorous Unit Award	RVN Gallantry Cross Unit Citation With Palm	RVN Civil Action Unit Citation 1st Class

== See also ==
List of Medal of Honor recipients for the Vietnam War
