= David C. Dolby =

American soldier (1946–2010)

David Charles Dolby
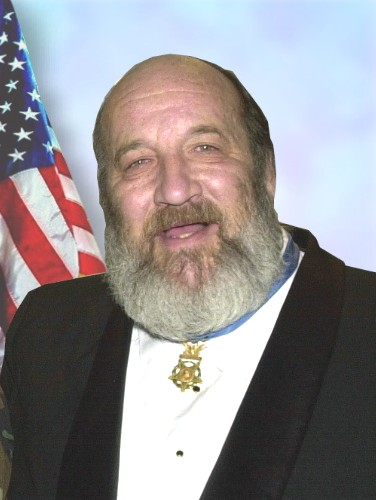
- Dolby in 2010
- Born: May 14, 1946; Norristown, Pennsylvania
- Died: August 6, 2010 (aged 64); Spirit Lake, Idaho, US
- Burial place: Arlington National Cemetery
- Military career
- Allegiance: United States
- Branch: United States Army
- Service years: 1964–1971
- Rank: Staff Sergeant
- Nickname: Mad Dog
- Units: 8th Cavalry Regiment, 1st Cavalry Division
- Conflicts: Vietnam War
- Awards: Medal of Honor; Silver Star

David Charles Dolby (May 14, 1946 – August 6, 2010) was a United States Army soldier who received the U.S. military's highest decoration, the Medal of Honor, for his actions in the Vietnam War.

== Biography ==
Dolby was born on May 14, 1946, in Norristown, Pennsylvania. His father, Charles L. Dolby, was a personnel manager for B.F. Goodrich Company in Oaks, Pennsylvania. He had a younger brother, Daniel.

Dolby joined the Army from Philadelphia at age 18, and by May 21, 1966, was serving in the Republic of Vietnam as a specialist four with Company B, 1st Battalion (Airborne), 8th Cavalry Regiment, 1st Cavalry Division (Airmobile). On that day, his platoon came under heavy fire which killed six soldiers and wounded a number of others, including the platoon leader. Throughout the ensuing four-hour battle, Dolby led his platoon in its defense, organized the extraction of the wounded, and directed artillery fire despite close-range attacks from enemy snipers and automatic weapons. He single-handedly attacked the hostile positions and silenced three machine guns, allowing a friendly force to execute a flank attack.

Dolby was subsequently promoted to sergeant and awarded the Medal of Honor for his actions during the battle. The medal was formally presented to him by President Lyndon B. Johnson on September 28, 1967.

In addition to the 1965–66 tour in which he earned the Medal of Honor, Dolby did four more tours in Vietnam. In 1967 he served there with the 1st Brigade, 101st Airborne Division, in 1969 with C Company (Ranger), 75th Infantry (Airborne), First Field Force Vietnam, in 1970 as an Adviser to the Vietnamese Rangers, and in 1971 as an Adviser to the Royal Cambodian Army. He left the Army that same year with the rank of staff sergeant.

Dolby married, but had no children. After his wife Xuan's death around 1987, he lived quietly in southeastern Pennsylvania. Over the last 20 years, Dolby attended many veterans events around the U.S. and once opened the New York Stock Exchange on Veterans Day. He most recently worked to bring attention to the neglected Medal of Honor Grove at the Freedoms Foundation in Valley Forge, Pennsylvania.

Dolby died at age 64 on the morning of August 6, 2010, while visiting Spirit Lake, Idaho, for a veterans' gathering. Dolby died in his sleep and is buried in Arlington National Cemetery; section 59, plot 498.

== Medal of Honor Citation ==
For conspicuous gallantry and intrepidity at the risk of life above and beyond the call of duty, when his platoon, while advancing tactically, suddenly came under intense fire from the enemy located on a ridge immediately to the front. Six members of the platoon were killed instantly and a number were wounded, including the platoon leader. Sgt. Dolby's every move brought fire from the enemy. However, aware that the platoon leader was critically wounded, and that the platoon was in a precarious situation, Sgt. Dolby moved the wounded men to safety and deployed the remainder of the platoon to engage the enemy. Subsequently, his dying platoon leader ordered Sgt. Dolby to withdraw the forward elements to rejoin the platoon. Despite the continuing intense enemy fire and with utter disregard for his own safety, Sgt. Dolby positioned able-bodied men to cover the withdrawal of the forward elements, assisted the wounded to the new position, and he, alone, attacked enemy positions until his ammunition was expended. Replenishing his ammunition, he returned to the area of most intense action, single-handedly killed 3 enemy machine gunners and neutralized the enemy fire, thus enabling friendly elements on the flank to advance on the enemy redoubt. He defied the enemy fire to personally carry a seriously wounded soldier to safety where he could be treated and, returning to the forward area, he crawled through withering fire to within 50 meters of the enemy bunkers and threw smoke grenades to mark them for air strikes. Although repeatedly under fire at close range from enemy snipers and automatic weapons, Sgt. Dolby directed artillery fire on the enemy and succeeded in silencing several enemy weapons. He remained in his exposed location until his comrades had displaced to more secure positions. His actions of unsurpassed valor during 4 hours of intense combat were a source of inspiration to his entire company, contributed significantly to the success of the overall assault on the enemy position, and were directly responsible for saving the lives of a number of his fellow soldiers. Sgt. Dolby's heroism was in the highest tradition of the U.S. Army.

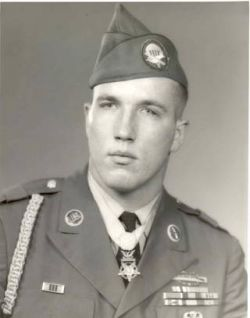

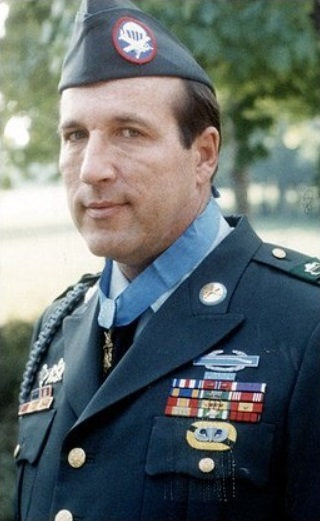

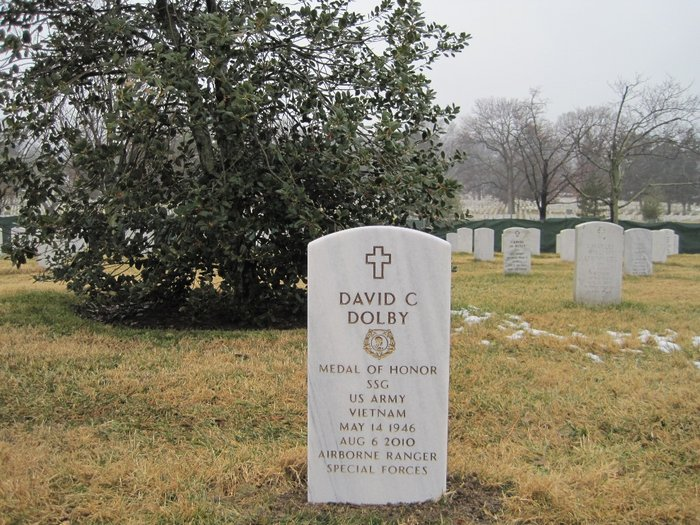

== See also ==
- List of Medal of Honor recipients for the Vietnam War
