= Donald Russell Long =

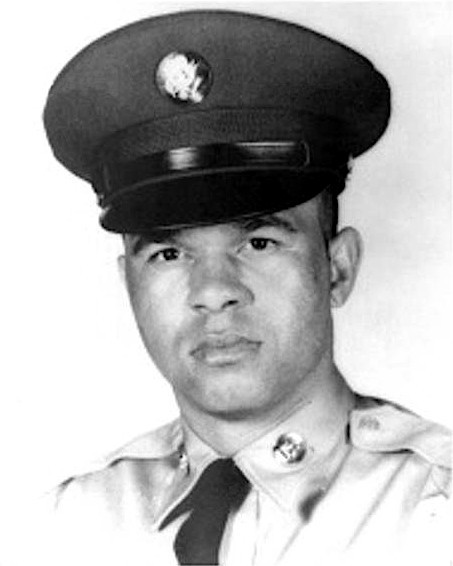
- Born: August 27, 1939; Blackfork, Ohio, U.S.
- Died: June 30, 1966 (aged 26); Republic of Vietnam
- Burial place: Union Baptist Church Cemetery, Blackfork, Ohio
- Military career
- Allegiance: United States
- Branch: United States Army
- Service years: 1963–1966
- Rank: Sergeant
- Units: 4th Cavalry Regiment, 1st Infantry Division
- Conflicts: Vietnam War †
- Awards: Medal of Honor; Purple Heart

Donald Russell Long (August 27, 1939 – June 30, 1966) was a United States Army soldier and a recipient of America's highest military decoration—the Medal of Honor—for his actions in the Vietnam War.

== Biography ==
Long was a Black American of mixed race descent (Black, White, Native American) descent and was a son of Herman Long and Mildred Keels. Many of his ancestors, along with the majority of Blackfork community members descendant from free people of color from Virginia and North Carolina, and many of them were Native Americans from tribes such as the Saponi. Sgt. Long graduated from Decatur-Washington High School in Blackfork, Ohio. Long joined the Army in Ashland, Kentucky in 1963, and by June 30, 1966, was serving as a Sergeant in Troop C, 1st Squadron, 4th Cavalry Regiment, 1st Infantry Division. On that day, Long's unit came under heavy enemy attack during a reconnaissance patrol. During the battle, a hand grenade was thrown near Long and the crew of a disabled armored personnel carrier. He threw himself on the grenade, successfully protecting his fellow soldiers while sacrificing his own life. On May 29, 2016, a commemoration in Oak Hill, Ohio took place. During the ceremony HB 366 named the portion of State Route 93 from the southern boundary of the Village of Oak Hill to the Jackson County line as the “Sgt. Donald Russell Long, Medal of Honor Recipient, Memorial Highway.”

== Medal of Honor citation ==
Rank and organization: Sergeant, U.S. Army, Troop C, 1st Squadron, 4th Cavalry, 1st Infantry Division. place and date: Republic of Vietnam, June 30, 1966. Entered service at: Ashland, Ky. Born: August 27, 1939, Blackfork, Ohio. G.O. No.: 13, April 4, 1968.

Citation:

For conspicuous gallantry and intrepidity in action at the risk of his life above and beyond the call of duty. Troops B and C, while conducting a reconnaissance mission along a road were suddenly attacked by a Viet Cong regiment, supported by mortars, recoilless rifles and machine guns, from concealed positions astride the road. Sgt. Long abandoned the relative safety of his armored personnel carrier and braved a withering hail of enemy fire to carry wounded men to evacuation helicopters. As the platoon fought its way forward to resupply advanced elements, Sgt. Long repeatedly exposed himself to enemy fire at point blank range to provide the needed supplies. While assaulting the Viet Cong position, Sgt. Long inspired his comrades by fearlessly standing unprotected to repel the enemy with rifle fire and grenades as they attempted to mount his carrier. When the enemy threatened to overrun a disabled carrier nearby, Sgt. Long again disregarded his own safety to help the severely wounded crew to safety. As he was handing arms to the less seriously wounded and reorganizing them to press the attack, an enemy grenade was hurled onto the carrier deck. Immediately recognizing the imminent danger, he instinctively shouted a warning to the crew and pushed to safety one man who had not heard his warning over the roar of battle. Realizing that these actions would not fully protect the exposed crewmen from the deadly explosion, he threw himself over the grenade to absorb the blast and thereby saved the lives of 8 of his comrades at the expense of his life. Throughout the battle, Sgt. Long's extraordinary heroism, courage and supreme devotion to his men were in the finest tradition of the military service, and reflect great credit upon himself and the U.S. Army.

== See also ==
- List of Medal of Honor recipients
- List of Medal of Honor recipients for the Vietnam War
