= William D. Port =

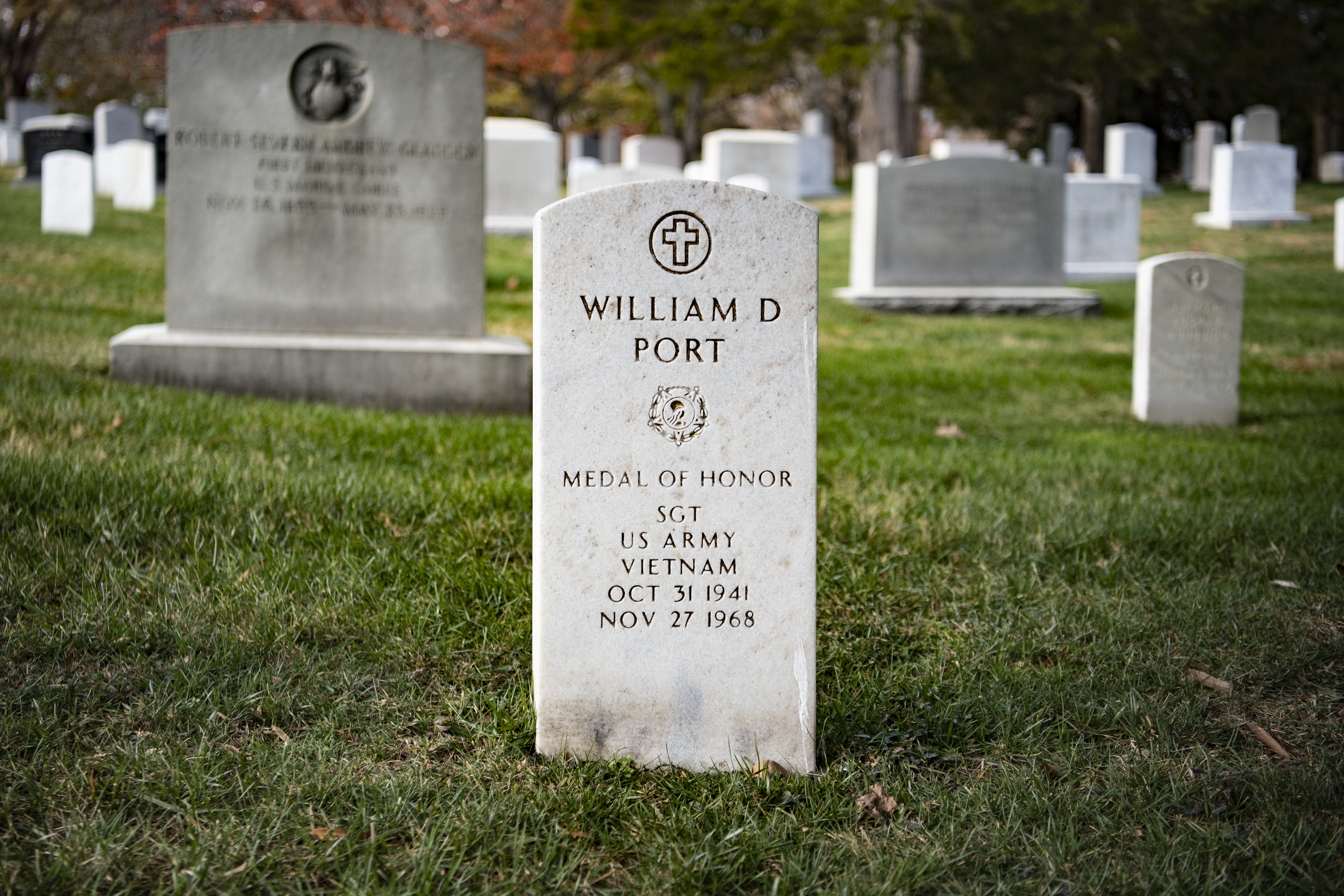
- Grave at Arlington National Cemetery
- Born: October 13, or October 31, 1941; Petersburg, Pennsylvania, U.S.
- Died: November 27, 1968 (aged 27); Que Son Valley, Quang Nam Province, South Vietnam
- Burial place: Arlington National Cemetery
- Military career
- Allegiance: United States
- Branch: United States Army
- Service years: 1967–1968
- Rank: Sergeant
- Units: 7th Cavalry Regiment, 1st Air Cavalry Division
- Conflicts: Vietnam War †
- Awards: Medal of Honor

William David Port (October 13, or October 31, 1941 – November 27, 1968) was a United States Army soldier and a recipient of the United States military's highest decoration, the Medal of Honor, for his actions in the Vietnam War.

== Biography ==
Port joined the Army from Harrisburg, Pennsylvania in March 1967, and by January 12, 1968, was serving as a private first class in Company C, 5th Battalion, 7th Cavalry Regiment, 1st Air Cavalry Division. During a firefight on that day, in the Que Son Valley, Quảng Nam Province, Republic of Vietnam, rescued a wounded comrade and then smothered the blast of an enemy-thrown grenade with his body to protect other soldiers. Port survived the blast, but was seriously wounded and captured by the enemy. He died while a prisoner of war ten months later. Port was promoted to Sergeant and posthumously awarded the Medal of Honor for his actions during the battle in August 1970.

Port, aged 27 at his death, was initially buried in a jungle grave along with 8 other prisoners. His remains were recovered in August 1985, and he was buried in Arlington National Cemetery two months later. In Huntingdon, Pennsylvania there is a bridge across the Juniata River named after William Port. A plaque describes his heroism.

== Medal of Honor ==
Rank and organization: Sergeant (then Pfc.), U.S. Army, Company C, 5th Battalion, 7th Cavalry, 1st Air Cavalry Division. Place and date: Que Son Valley, Quảng Nam Province, Republic of Vietnam, January 12, 1968. Entered service at: Harrisburg, Pa. Born: October 13, 1941, Petersburg, Pa.

Citation:

For conspicuous gallantry and intrepidity at the risk of his life above and beyond the call of duty. Sgt. Port distinguished himself while serving as a rifleman with Company C, which was conducting combat operations against an enemy force in the Que Son Valley. As Sgt. Port's platoon was moving to cut off a reported movement of enemy soldiers, the platoon came under heavy fire from an entrenched enemy force. The platoon was forced to withdraw due to the intensity and ferocity of the fire. Although wounded in the hand as the withdrawal began, Sgt. Port, with complete disregard for his safety, ran through the heavy fire to assist a wounded comrade back to the safety of the platoon perimeter. As the enemy forces assaulted in the perimeter, Sgt. Port and 3 comrades were in position behind an embankment when an enemy grenade landed in their midst. Sgt. Port, realizing the danger to his fellow soldiers, shouted the warning, "Grenade", and unhesitatingly hurled himself towards the grenade to shield his comrades from the explosion. Through his exemplary courage and devotion he saved the lives of his fellow soldiers and gave the members of his platoon the inspiration needed to hold their position. Sgt. Port's selfless concern for his comrades, at the risk of his life above and beyond the call of duty are in keeping with the highest tradition of the military service and reflect great credit on himself, his unit, and the U.S. Army.

== See also ==
- List of Medal of Honor recipients
- List of Medal of Honor recipients for the Vietnam War
