= Jimmy G. Stewart =

American army soldier

Jimmy Goethel Stewart
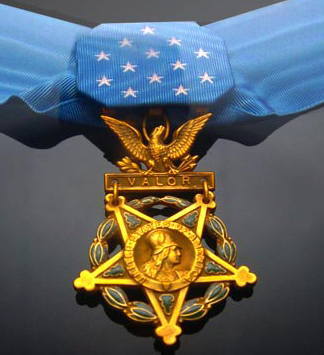
- Army Medal of Honor
- Born: December 25, 1942; West Columbia, West Virginia, U.S.
- Died: May 18, 1966 (aged 23); South Vietnam
- Burial place: Riverview Cemetery, Middleport, Ohio
- Military career
- Allegiance: United States
- Branch: United States Army
- Service years: 1960–1966
- Rank: Staff Sergeant
- Units: 12th Cavalry Regiment, 1st Cavalry Division
- Conflicts: Vietnam War †
- Awards: Medal of Honor; Purple Heart

Jimmy Goethel Stewart (December 25, 1942 – May 18, 1966) was a United States Army soldier and a posthumous recipient of the U.S. military's highest decoration, the Medal of Honor, for his actions in the Vietnam War.

== Biography ==
Born on December 25, 1942, in West Columbia, West Virginia, Stewart joined the Army from Ashland, Kentucky in 1960. He served in Vietnam as a staff sergeant with Company B of the 2nd Battalion, 12th Cavalry Regiment, 1st Cavalry Division (Airmobile). On the morning of May 18, 1966, Company B was manning a defensive position when they were attacked by a reinforced North Vietnamese company, with the main thrust of the assault pitting Stewart's 6-man squad against a platoon-sized hostile force. Although his five squadmates fell wounded, Stewart ignored an opportunity to withdraw and instead held his position alone for four hours, tossing back enemy-thrown grenades and crawling through heavy fire to retrieve ammunition from the wounded. When a friendly platoon arrived and counterattacked the North Vietnamese, he moved forward and was killed while assisting their effort. For these actions, he was posthumously awarded the Medal of Honor in September 1967.

Stewart, aged 23 at his death, is buried in Middleport, Ohio. His name is listed on the Vietnam Veterans Memorial ("The Wall") on panel 07E – Row 084.

== Medal of Honor citation ==
Stewart's official Medal of Honor citation reads:

For conspicuous gallantry and intrepidity in action at the risk of his life above and beyond the call of duty. Early in the morning a reinforced North Vietnamese company attacked Company B, which was manning a defensive perimeter in Vietnam. The surprise onslaught wounded 5 members of a 6-man squad caught in the direct path of the enemy's thrust. S/Sgt. Stewart became a lone defender of vital terrain—virtually 1 man against a hostile platoon. Refusing to take advantage of a lull in the firing which would have permitted him to withdraw, S/Sgt. Stewart elected to hold his ground to protect his fallen comrades and prevent an enemy penetration of the company perimeter. As the full force of the platoon-sized man attack struck his lone position, he fought like a man possessed; emptying magazine after magazine at the determined, on-charging enemy. The enemy drove almost to his position and hurled grenades, but S/Sgt. Stewart decimated them by retrieving and throwing the grenades back. Exhausting his ammunition, he crawled under intense fire to his wounded team members and collected ammunition that they were unable to use. Far past the normal point of exhaustion, he held his position for 4 harrowing hours and through 3 assaults, annihilating the enemy as they approached and before they could get a foothold. As a result of his defense, the company position held until the arrival of a reinforcing platoon which counterattacked the enemy, now occupying foxholes to the left of S/Sgt. Stewart's position. After the counterattack, his body was found in a shallow enemy hole where he had advanced in order to add his fire to that of the counterattacking platoon. Eight enemy dead were found around his immediate position, with evidence that 15 others had been dragged away. The wounded whom he gave his life to protect, were recovered and evacuated. S/Sgt. Stewart's indomitable courage, in the face of overwhelming odds, stands as a tribute to himself and an inspiration to all men of his unit. His actions were in the highest traditions of the U.S. Army and the Armed Forces of his country.

== See also ==
- List of Medal of Honor recipients for the Vietnam War
