= Robert D. Law =

Robert David Law
- Army Medal of Honor
- Born: September 15, 1944; Fort Worth, Texas, US
- Died: February 22, 1969 (aged 24); Phước Thành Province, Republic of Vietnam
- Burial place: Mount Olivet Cemetery, Fort Worth, Texas
- Military career
- Allegiance: United States
- Branch: United States Army
- Service years: 1967–1969
- Rank: Specialist Four
- Units: 75th Ranger Infantry Regiment (Airborne), 1st Infantry Division
- Conflicts: Vietnam War †
- Awards: Medal of Honor; Bronze Star; Purple Heart

Robert David Law (September 15, 1944 – February 22, 1969) was a United States Army soldier and a recipient of the United States military's highest decoration—the Medal of Honor—for his actions in the Vietnam War.

== Biography ==
Law joined the Army from Dallas, Texas in October 1967, and by February 22, 1969, was serving as a specialist four in Company I, 75th Ranger Infantry Regiment (Airborne), 1st Infantry Division. During a firefight on that day, in Tinh Phuoc Thanh Province, Republic of Vietnam, Law smothered the blast of an enemy grenade with his body, sacrificing his life to protect those around him.

Law, aged 24 at his death, was buried at Mount Olivet Cemetery in his birth city of Fort Worth, Texas.

== Medal of Honor citation ==
Specialist Law's official Medal of Honor citation reads:

For conspicuous gallantry and intrepidity in action at the risk of his life above and beyond the call of duty. Sp4 Law distinguished himself while serving with Company I. While on a long-range reconnaissance patrol in Tinh Phuoc Thanh province, Sp4 Law and 5 comrades made contact with a small enemy patrol. As the opposing elements exchanged intense fire, he maneuvered to a perilously exposed position flanking his comrades and began placing suppressive fire on the hostile troops. Although his team was hindered by a low supply of ammunition and suffered from an unidentified irritating gas in the air, Sp4 Law's spirited defense and challenging counterassault rallied his fellow soldiers against the well-equipped hostile troops. When an enemy grenade landed in his team's position, Sp4 Law, instead of diving into the safety of a stream behind him, threw himself on the grenade to save the lives of his comrades. Sp4 Law's extraordinary courage and profound concern for his fellow soldiers were in keeping with the highest traditions of the military service and reflect great credit on himself, his unit, and the U.S. Army.

== See also ==
- List of Medal of Honor recipients
- List of Medal of Honor recipients for the Vietnam War
