= Dale Eugene Wayrynen =

- Army Medal of Honor
- Born: January 18, 1947; Moose Lake, Minnesota, US
- Died: May 18, 1967 (aged 20); Duc Pho District, Quảng Ngãi Province, Republic of Vietnam
- Burial place: Rice River Lutheran Cemetery McGregor, Minnesota
- Military career
- Allegiance: United States of America
- Branch: United States Army
- Service years: 1965–1967
- Rank: Specialist Four
- Units: Company B, 2d Battalion, 502d Infantry, 1st Brigade, 101st Airborne Division
- Conflicts: Vietnam War (DOW)
- Awards: Medal of Honor; Purple Heart

Dale Eugene Wayrynen (January 18, 1947 – May 18, 1967) was a United States Army enlisted soldier and a recipient of America's highest military decoration—the Medal of Honor—for his actions in the Vietnam War.

== Biography ==
Wayrynen joined the Army from Minneapolis in 1965. On May 18, 1967, he was in Quảng Ngãi Province, Vietnam, when the unit came under attack. During the fight, Wayrynen threw himself on an enemy-thrown grenade that was tossed into his company, undoubtedly saving many lives at the cost of his own.

He is buried in Rice River Lutheran Cemetery McGregor, Minnesota.

== Medal of Honor citation ==
Rank and organization: Specialist Four, U.S. Army, Company B, 2d Battalion, 502d Infantry, 1st Brigade, 101st Airborne Division. Place and date: Quang Ngai, Province, Republic of Vietnam, May 18, 1967. Entered service at: Minneapolis, Minn. Born: January 18, 1947, Moose Lake, Minn.

Citation:

For conspicuous gallantry and intrepidity in action at the risk of his life above and beyond the call of duty. Sp4 Wayrynen distinguished himself with Company B, during combat operations near Duc Pho. His platoon was assisting in the night evacuation of the wounded from an earlier enemy contact when the lead man of the unit met face to face with a Viet Cong soldier. The American's shouted warning also alerted the enemy who immediately swept the area with automatic weapons fire from a strongly built bunker close to the trail and threw hand grenades from another nearby fortified position. Almost immediately, the lead man was wounded and knocked from his feet. Sp4 Wayrynen, the second man in the formation, leaped beyond his fallen comrade to kill another enemy soldier who appeared on the trail, and he dragged his injured companion back to where the point squad had taken cover. Suddenly, a live enemy grenade landed in the center of the tightly grouped men. Sp4 Wayrynen, quickly assessing the danger to the entire squad as well as to his platoon leader who was nearby, shouted a warning, pushed one soldier out of the way, and threw himself on the grenade at the moment it exploded. He was mortally wounded. His deep and abiding concern for his fellow soldiers was significantly reflected in his supreme and courageous act that preserved the lives of his comrades. Sp4 Wayrynen's heroic actions are in keeping with the highest traditions of the service, and they reflect great credit upon himself and the U.S. Army.

== See also ==
- List of Medal of Honor recipients
- List of Medal of Honor recipients for the Vietnam War
