= Jimmy W. Phipps =

Jimmy Wayne Phipps
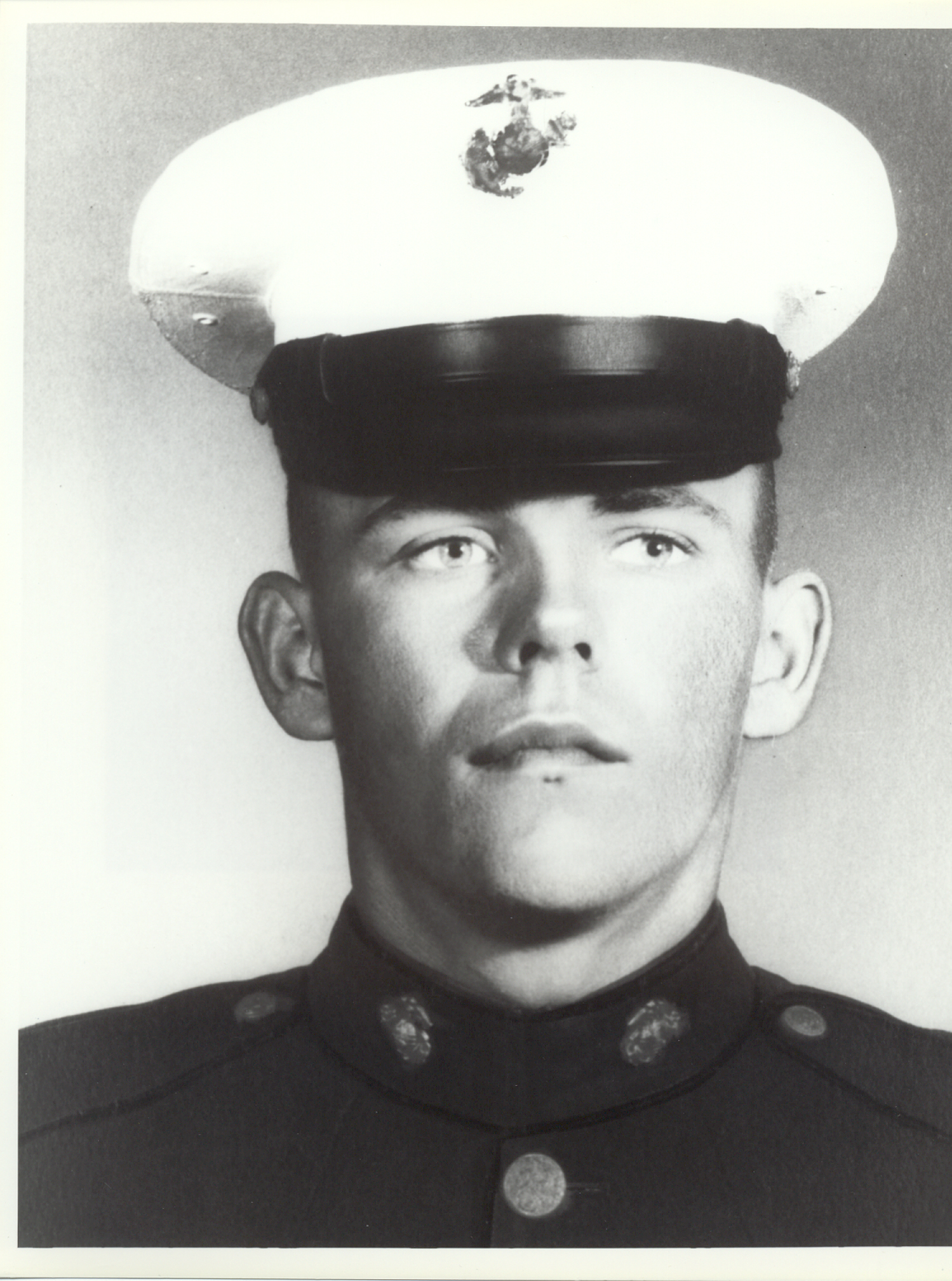
- Jimmy W. Phipps, posthumous Medal of Honor recipient
- Born: Jimmy Wayne Phipps; November 1, 1950; Santa Monica, California, U.S.
- Died: May 27, 1969 (aged 18) near An Hoa Combat Base, Quang Nam Province, South Vietnam
- Burial place: Woodlawn Cemetery, Santa Monica, California
- Military career
- Allegiance: United States of America
- Branch: United States Marine Corps
- Service years: 1968–1969
- Rank: Private First Class
- Units: Company B, 1st Engineer Battalion, 1st Marine Division
- Conflicts: Vietnam War †
- Awards: Medal of Honor; Purple Heart

Jimmy Wayne Phipps (November 1, 1950 – May 27, 1969) was a United States Marine who posthumously received the Medal of Honor for his heroic actions on May 27, 1969, in the Vietnam War.

== Biography ==
Jimmy Wayne Phipps was born on November 1, 1950, in Santa Monica, California. He attended Marina Del Ray Junior High School in Culver City, California, and Venice High School in Venice, California.

He left high school to enlist in the U.S. Marine Corps Reserve on January 3, 1968, and was discharged on January 7, 1968, to enlist in the Regular Marine Corps.

He completed recruit training with the 2nd Recruit Training Battalion, Recruit Training Regiment, Marine Corps Recruit Depot San Diego, California on March 14, 1968. Transferred to Marine Corps Base Camp Pendleton, California, he underwent individual combat training with Company L, 2nd Battalion, 2nd Infantry Training Regiment, followed by basic infantry training which he completed in May 1968.

From June until August 1968, he was a student with the Marine Aviation Detachment, Naval Air Technical Training Command, Memphis, Tennessee. Transferred to Marine Corps Base Camp Lejeune, North Carolina, he attended the Marine Corps Engineer Schools, until the following October. He was promoted to private first class on October 1, 1968.

In December 1968, he was transferred to the Republic of Vietnam where he served as a combat engineer with Company B, 1st Engineer Battalion, 1st Marine Division. He was initially attached to Company C, 1st Battalion 5th Marines (C/1/5) as its combat engineer. He was then detached and returned to Company B, but in late May, volunteered to return to the field with C/1/5. While participating in combat in what was referred to as the "Arizona Territory," located in the vicinity of An Hoa on May 27, 1969, he was killed in action during the combat action for which he was awarded the Medal of Honor.

Phipps' photo was featured in Life Magazine's cover story, The Faces of the American Dead in Vietnam: One Week’s Toll, June 1969, which featured photos of 242 servicemen who perished during 1 week in Vietnam.

He died on May 27, 1969, and was buried at Woodlawn Cemetery in Santa Monica.

== Awards and honors ==
Phipps's awards include:

Medal of Honor	Purple Heart w/ 1 award star	Combat Action Ribbon	National Defense Service Medal
Vietnam Service Medal w/ 1 service star	Vietnam Gallantry Cross unit citation	Vietnam Civil Actions unit citation	Vietnam Campaign Medal

The name "Jimmy W. Phipps" is inscribed on the Vietnam Veterans Memorial on Panel 23W, Row 002.

=== Medal of Honor citation ===
The President of the United States takes pride in presenting the MEDAL OF HONOR posthumously to

PRIVATE FIRST CLASS JIMMY W. PHIPPS
UNITED STATES MARINE CORPS

for service as set forth in the following CITATION:

For conspicuous gallantry and intrepidity at the risk of his life above and beyond the call of duty while serving as a combat Engineer with Company B, First Engineer Battalion, First Marine Division in connection with combat operations against the enemy in the Republic of Vietnam. On 27 May 1969, Private First Class Phipps, was a member of a two-man combat engineer demolition team assigned to locate and destroy enemy artillery ordnance and concealed firing devices. After he had expended all of his explosives and blasting caps, Private First Class Phipps discovered a 175mm high explosive artillery round in a rice paddy. Suspecting that the enemy had attached at the artillery round to a secondary explosive device, he warned other Marines in the area to move to covered positions and prepared to destroy the round with a hand grenade. As he was attaching the hand grenade to a stake beside the artillery round, the fuse of the enemy's secondary explosive device ignited. Realizing that his assistant and the platoon commander were both with a few meters of him and that the imminent explosion could kill all three men, Private First Class Phipps grasped the hand grenade to his chest and dived forward to cover the enemy's explosive and the artillery round with his body, thereby shielding his companions from the detonation while absorbing the full and tremendous impact with his own body. Private First Class Phipp's indomitable courage, inspiring initiative and selfless devotion to duty saved the lives of two Marines and upheld the highest traditions of the Marine Corps and the United States Naval Service. He gallantly gave his life for his country.

/S/ RICHARD M. NIXON

== See also ==
- List of Medal of Honor recipients
- List of Medal of Honor recipients for the Vietnam War
