= John G. Gertsch =

United States Army Medal of Honor recipient (1944–1969)

John Gary Gertsch
- Army Medal of Honor
- Born: September 29, 1944 or 1945; Jersey City, New Jersey, US
- Died: July 19, 1969; A Shau Valley, Republic of Vietnam
- Burial place: North Side Catholic Cemetery, Pittsburgh, Pennsylvania
- Military career
- Allegiance: United States of America
- Branch: United States Army
- Service years: 1965–1969
- Rank: Staff Sergeant
- Units: Company E, 1st Battalion, 327th Infantry Regiment, 101st Airborne Division
- Conflicts: Vietnam War †
- Awards: Medal of Honor; Silver Star (2); Bronze Star (3); Purple Heart (3)

John Gary Gertsch (September 29, 1944 or 1945 – July 19, 1969) was a United States Army soldier and a recipient of the United States military's highest decoration, the Medal of Honor, for his actions in the Vietnam War.

== Biography ==
John G. Gertsch went to high school in Sheffield Area Middle/Senior High School (SAMSHS) in Sheffield, Pennsylvania. Gertsch joined the Army from Buffalo, New York in 1965, and by July 15, 1969, was serving as a staff sergeant in Company E, 1st Battalion, 327th Infantry Regiment, 101st Airborne Division. During a series of engagements on that day and the four following days, in the A Shau Valley of the Republic of Vietnam, Gertsch commanded his platoon after their leader was wounded and repeatedly exposed himself to enemy fire to rescue wounded soldiers and attack the enemy. Mortally wounded on July 19, he was posthumously awarded the Medal of Honor for his actions in September 1974.

Gertsch, aged 23 or 24 at his death, was buried in North Side Catholic Cemetery, Pittsburgh, Pennsylvania.

== Medal of Honor citation ==
Staff Sergeant Gertsch's official Medal of Honor citation reads:

S/Sgt. Gertsch distinguished himself while serving as a platoon sergeant and platoon leader during combat operations in the A Shau Valley. During the initial phase of an operation to seize a strongly defended enemy position, S/Sgt. Gertsch's platoon leader was seriously wounded and lay exposed to intense enemy fire. Forsaking his own safety, without hesitation S/Sgt. Gertsch rushed to aid his fallen leader and dragged him to a sheltered position. He then assumed command of the heavily engaged platoon and led his men in a fierce counterattack that forced the enemy to withdraw. Later, a small element of S/Sgt. Gertsch's unit was reconnoitering when attacked again by the enemy. S/Sgt. Gertsch moved forward to his besieged element and immediately charged, firing as he advanced. His determined assault forced the enemy troops to withdraw in confusion and made possible the recovery of 2 wounded men who had been exposed to heavy enemy fire. Sometime later his platoon came under attack by an enemy force employing automatic weapons, grenade, and rocket fire. S/Sgt. Gertsch was severely wounded during the onslaught but continued to command his platoon despite his painful wound. While moving under fire and encouraging his men he sighted an aidman treating a wounded officer from an adjacent unit. Realizing that both men were in imminent danger of being killed, he rushed forward and positioned himself between them and the enemy nearby. While the wounded officer was being moved to safety S/Sgt. Gertsch was mortally wounded by enemy fire. Without S/Sgt. Gertsch's courage, ability to inspire others, and profound concern for the welfare of his men, the loss of life among his fellow soldiers would have been significantly greater. His conspicuous gallantry, extraordinary heroism, and intrepidity at the cost of his life, above and beyond the call of duty, are in the highest traditions of the U.S. Army and reflect great credit on him and the Armed Forces of his country.

== See also ==
- List of Medal of Honor recipients for the Vietnam War
