= Richard A. Penry =

United States Army Medal of Honor recipient (1948–1994)

Richard Allen Penry
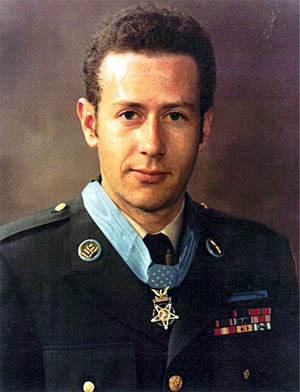
- Born: November 18, 1948; Petaluma, California, US
- Died: May 9, 1994 (aged 45); Petaluma, California
- Burial place: Cypress Hill Memorial Park, Petaluma, California
- Military career
- Allegiance: United States
- Branch: United States Army
- Service years: 1969–1971
- Rank: Sergeant
- Units: 12th Infantry Regiment, 199th Infantry Brigade
- Conflicts: Vietnam War
- Awards: Medal of Honor; Distinguished Service Cross; Bronze Star; Air Medal

Richard Allen Penry (November 18, 1948 – May 9, 1994) was a United States Army soldier and a recipient of the United States military's highest decoration—the Medal of Honor—for his actions in the Vietnam War.

== Biography ==
Born in Petaluma, California, Penry joined the Army from Oakland, California in March 1969, and by January 31, 1970, was serving as a Sergeant in Company C, 4th Battalion, 12th Infantry Regiment, 199th Infantry Brigade. On that day, in Binh Tuy Province of the Republic of Vietnam, his unit came under an intense enemy attack. After the company commander was wounded, Penry helped organize the defense of the area and repeatedly exposed himself to enemy fire to retrieve supplies and return fire. He was honorably discharged from the Army in March 1971.

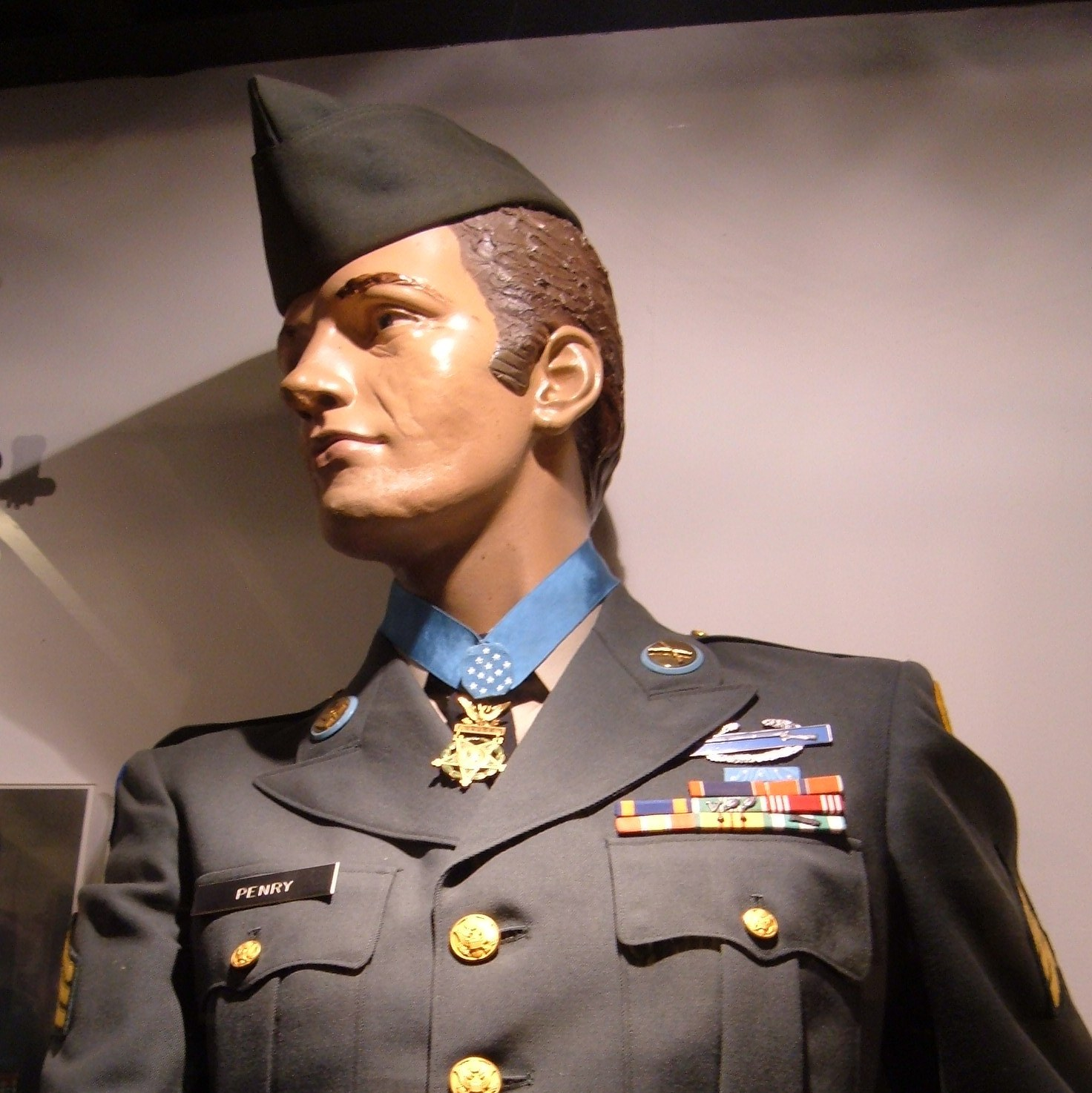
Penry's Medal of Honor and ribbons on display at the Sgt. Richard Penry Medal of Honor Memorial Military Museum in Petaluma, California

In the 1970s, Penry was arrested for selling cocaine to an undercover agent. He was placed on parole in 1974, the judge stated that Penry had "done more for his country in one day than most do in a lifetime." Penry was arrested again in 1976 and put on probation.

Penry suffered from Lupus and died at age 45 of cancer. He was buried in Cypress Hill Memorial Park in Petaluma. Penry has two namesakes in his hometown: a park that was renamed in his honor, and a small military museum, the Sgt. Richard Penry Medal of Honor Memorial Military Museum, where his Medal of Honor is displayed.

In April, 2025, California Governor Gavin Newsom pardoned Penry posthumously of state charges. As of April, 2025, Penry still held a federal conviction.

== Medal of Honor citation ==
Sergeant Penry's Medal of Honor citation reads:

Medal of Honor

For conspicuous gallantry and intrepidity in action at the risk of his life above and beyond the call of duty. Sgt. Penry, Company C, distinguished himself while serving as a rifleman during a night ambush mission. As the platoon was preparing the ambush position, it suddenly came under an intense enemy attack from mortar, rocket, and automatic weapons fire which seriously wounded the company commander and most of the platoon members, leaving small isolated groups of wounded men throughout the area. Sgt. Penry, seeing the extreme seriousness of the situation, worked his way through the deadly enemy fire to the company command post where he administered first aid to the wounded company commander and other personnel. He then moved the command post to a position which provided greater protection and visual communication and control of other platoon elements.Realizing the company radio was damaged and recognizing the urgent necessity to reestablish communications with the battalion headquarters, he ran outside the defensive perimeter through a fusillade of hostile fire to retrieve a radio. Finding it inoperable, Sgt. Penry returned through heavy fire to retrieve 2 more radios. Turning his attention to the defense of the area, he crawled to the edge of the perimeter, retrieved needed ammunition and weapons and resupplied the wounded men. During a determined assault by over 30 enemy soldiers, Sgt. Penry occupied the most vulnerable forward position placing heavy, accurate fire on the attacking enemy and exposing himself several times to throw hand grenades into the advancing enemy troops. He succeeded virtually single-handedly in stopping the attack. Learning that none of the radios were operable, Sgt. Penry again crawled outside the defensive perimeter, retrieved a fourth radio and established communications with higher headquarters. Sgt. Penry then continued to administer first aid to the wounded and repositioned them to better repel further enemy attacks. Despite continuous and deadly sniper fire, he again left the defensive perimeter, moved to within a few feet of enemy positions, located 5 isolated wounded soldiers, and led them to safety. When evacuation helicopters approached, Sgt. Penry voluntarily left the perimeter, set up a guiding beacon, established the priorities for evacuation and successively carried 18 wounded men to the extraction site. After all wounded personnel had been evacuated, Sgt. Penry joined another platoon and assisted in the pursuit of the enemy. Sgt. Penry's extraordinary heroism at the risk of his own life are in keeping with the highest traditions of the military service and reflect great credit on him, his unit, and the U.S. Army.

== Awards and decorations ==

Badge	Combat Infantryman Badge		
1st row	Medal of Honor	Distinguished Service Cross	Bronze Star
2nd row	Air Medal	Army Commendation Medal with "V" device and 2 Oak leaf clusters	Army Good Conduct Medal
3rd row	National Defense Service Medal	Vietnam Service Medal with 2 bronze Campaign stars	Vietnam Campaign Medal with "60-" clasp

== See also ==
- List of Medal of Honor recipients
- List of Medal of Honor recipients for the Vietnam War

== Sources ==
- "Vietnam War Medal of Honor recipients (M-Z)". Medal of Honor citations. United States Army Center of Military History. October 3, 2003. Archived from the original on April 24, 2008.
- "Museums in Petaluma". Military Museum. Petaluma Visitor Center. 2004. Archived from the original on February 27, 2008.
