= Hugh R. Nelson Jr. =

- Born: 11 July 1937; Tuscaloosa, Alabama, U.S.
- Died: 5 June 1966 (aged 28); Mộc Hóa district, South Vietnam
- Military career
- Allegiance: United States
- Branch: United States Army
- Service years: 1963–1966
- Rank: Captain
- Conflicts: Vietnam War †
- Awards: Medal of Honor

Hugh Reavis Nelson Jr. (11 July 1937 – 5 June 1966) was a United States Army officer who was posthumously awarded the Medal of Honor on 3 January 2025 for his actions on 5 June 1966 during the Vietnam War.

== Early life ==
He was born on 11 July 1937 in Tuscaloosa, Alabama to United States Army Air Corps Lieutenant colonel Hugh Reavis Nelson Sr. and Sarah Beth Burnett (Diddy) Nelson. He had a younger brother, Joseph Reed Peter Nelson, and sister, Frances Barbara Nelson McComas Rowe (deceased).

He graduated from Durham High School in 1955, where he played football and ran track, placing third in the state championship his senior year, and belonged to other clubs and organizations.

He graduated from The Citadel in Charleston, South Carolina, in 1959 and married Elizabeth Ann Dees on 22 July 1959. They had three children: Debra Ann, Margaret Dees and Hugh Reavis Nelson III.

== Military career ==
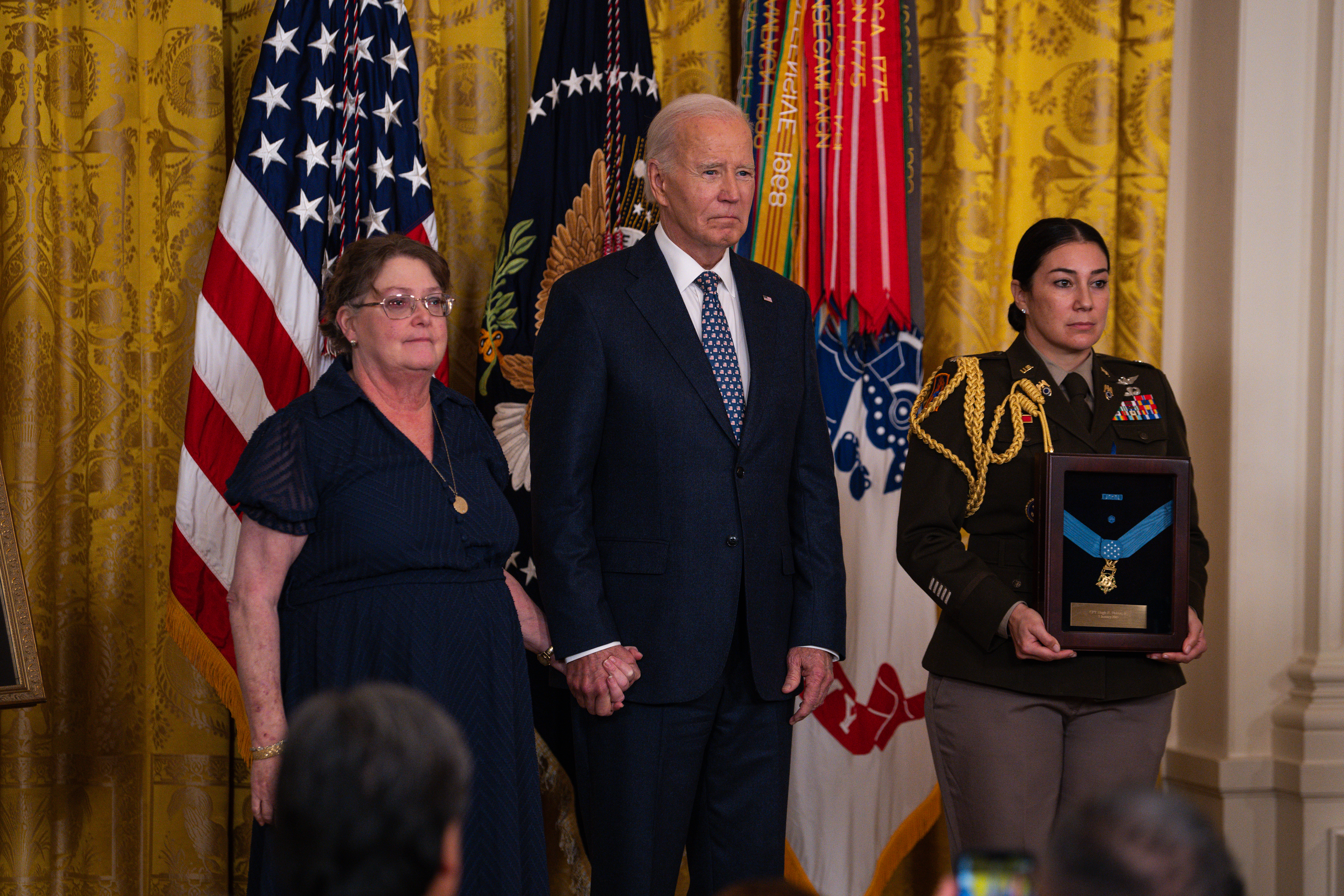
President Joe Biden stands next to Debra Nelson McKnight during the reading of the Medal of Honor citation for Captain Hugh R. Nelson Jr.

He was commissioned in September 1963. He was stationed in Taiwan for three years, then reported for duty in South Vietnam on 2 January 1966, serving with the 114th Aviation Company (Airmobile Light).

== Medal of Honor Citation ==
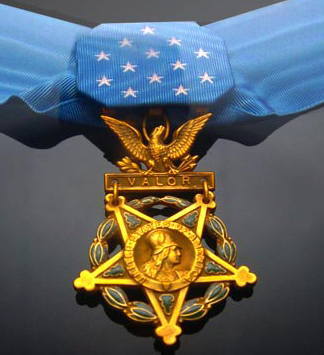

The President of the United States of America, authorized by Act of Congress March 3rd, 1863, has awarded in the name of Congress the Medal of Honor to

Capt. Hugh R. Nelson, Jr., distinguished himself by conspicuous gallantry and intrepidity above and beyond the call of duty while serving as a member of the 114th Aviation Company (Airmobile Light) on June 5, 1966, near Moc Hoa, Republic of Vietnam. Nelson was the acting aircraft commander of a Huey helicopter on a search-and-destroy reconnaissance mission when it was struck by a large volume of enemy fire that rendered the aircraft virtually uncontrollable.

With great difficulty, Nelson and the pilot were able to crash-land the aircraft without lateral controls. At some point after the crash, Nelson exited the aircraft and went to the aid of his wounded comrades. Proceeding to the other side of the aircraft, he found his dazed and wounded crew chief still trapped inside. After removing the specialist and placing him on the ground, Nelson climbed into the severely damaged helicopter to assist the door gunner, who was still strapped inside and unable to move.

While Nelson tried to free his comrade, the insurgents engaged the aircraft with a heavy volume of automatic rifle and small-arms fire at a range of approximately thirty feet from the aircraft. Despite the heavy enemy fire, Nelson continued his gallant efforts, freeing the trapped door gunner despite being hit by enemy fire. Upon removing the wounded door gunner from the aircraft, he forced the specialist to the ground and, without regard for his own life, used his body as a shield to cover his comrade from the intense enemy fire. Nelson was hit several times as he sacrificed his own life to save his comrade.

His selfless sacrifice allowed his wounded comrade to use a smoke grenade to signal supporting aircraft in the area that there were crash survivors. The supporting aircraft responded immediately, preventing the insurgents from advancing on the downed aircraft and successfully rescuing the three wounded crew members.

Nelson's conscious decision to sacrifice his own life for that of his comrades saved the lives of his three fellow crew members that fateful day. Nelson's distinctive accomplishments are in keeping with the highest traditions of military service and reflect great credit upon him, his unit and the United States Army.

== See also ==
- List of Medal of Honor recipients for the Vietnam War
