= Jerry Wayne Wickam =

United States Army Medal of Honor recipient (1942–1968)

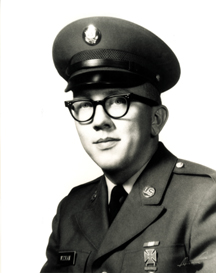
- Corporal Jerry Wickam
- Born: January 19, 1942; Rockford, Illinois, U.S.
- Died: January 6, 1968 (aged 25) near Loc Ninh, Binh Phuoc Province, Republic of Vietnam
- Burial place: Lightsville Cemetery, Leaf River, Illinois
- Military career
- Allegiance: United States of America
- Branch: United States Army
- Service years: 1966–1968
- Rank: Corporal
- Units: Troop F, 2nd Squadron, 11th Armored Cavalry Regiment
- Conflicts: Vietnam War †
- Awards: Medal of Honor; Purple Heart

Jerry Wayne Wickam (January 19, 1942 – January 6, 1968) was a United States Army soldier and a recipient of the United States military's highest decoration—the Medal of Honor—for his actions in the Vietnam War.

== Biography ==
Wickam joined the army from Chicago, Illinois in 1966, and by January 6, 1968, was serving as a corporal in Troop F of 2nd Squadron, 11th Armored Cavalry Regiment. On that day, near Loc Ninh in the Republic of Vietnam, Wickam single-handedly attacked several enemy bunkers before being fatally wounded.

Wickam, aged 25 at his death, was buried in Lightsville Cemetery, Leaf River, Illinois.

== Medal of Honor citation ==
Corporal Wickam's Medal of Honor citation reads:

For conspicuous gallantry and intrepidity in action at the risk of his life above and beyond the call of duty. Cpl. Wickam, distinguished himself while serving with Troop F. Troop F was conducting a reconnaissance in force mission southwest of Loc Ninh when the lead element of the friendly force was subjected to a heavy barrage of rocket, automatic weapons, and small arms fire from a well concealed enemy bunker complex. Disregarding the intense fire, Cpl. Wickam leaped from his armored vehicle and assaulted one of the enemy bunkers and threw a grenade into it, killing 2 enemy soldiers. He moved into the bunker, and with the aid of another soldier, began to remove the body of one Viet Cong when he detected the sound of an enemy grenade being charged. Cpl. Wickam warned his comrade and physically pushed him away from the grenade thus protecting him from the force of the blast. When a second Viet Cong bunker was discovered, he ran through a hail of enemy fire to deliver deadly fire into the bunker, killing one enemy soldier. He also captured 1 Viet Cong who later provided valuable information on enemy activity in the Loc Ninh area. After the patrol withdrew and an air strike was conducted, Cpl. Wickam led his men back to evaluate the success of the strike. They were immediately attacked again by enemy fire. Without hesitation, he charged the bunker from which the fire was being directed, enabling the remainder of his men to seek cover. He threw a grenade inside of the enemy's position killing 2 Viet Cong and destroying the bunker. Moments later he was mortally wounded by enemy fire. Cpl. Wickam's extraordinary heroism at the cost of his life were in keeping with the highest traditions of the military service and reflect great credit upon himself and the U.S. Army.

== Other Awards & Honors ==
1968 – Leaf River High School. The Jerry W. Wickam most valuable defensive player award in Football

1968 – Leaf River, Illinois. American Legion Post 1148 named Jerry W. Wickam American Legion Post 1148.

1970 – Sundstrand Corporation scholarship awarded to engineering student. Ceremony attended by 1980 presidential candidate John B. Anderson

1972 – Ft. Knox, Kentucky opened The Wickam Guest House to house servicemen and their family as temporary quarters. Now operating as Holiday Inn Express Wickam Inn.

1973 – Ft. Campbell, Kentucky. Opening of the Don F. Pratt & Jerry W. Wickam Museum, a small military museum on base. It is now called Wickam Hall and the Don F. Pratt Museum is inside.

1996 – Ft. Knox, Kentucky. The grand re-opening of the new and improved Wickam Guest House..

2007 – Ft. Irwin, California. Jerry Wayne Wickam Park. A nice park on the military base that currently houses the 11th Armored Cavalry Regiment.

2011 – Ft. Benning, Georgia. McGinnis-Wickam Hall. This was the opening and dedication of the new headquarters building for Ft. Benning, named after Wickam and a Medal of Honor recipient from the Iraq War, Ross McGinnis.

2014 – South Hamilton, Massachusetts. Wickam Field. General George Patton IV, son of the WWII General George S. Patton, owned a huge organic farm in Massachusetts with his wife Joanne. General Patton Jr. was Wickam's Regimental Colonel and he named the different fields on his, now, public co-op farm after Medal of Honor recipients under his command in Vietnam.

2018 - Central figure in non-fiction book The Unforced Rhythms of Grace & Gratitude, written by his son Michael Wickam

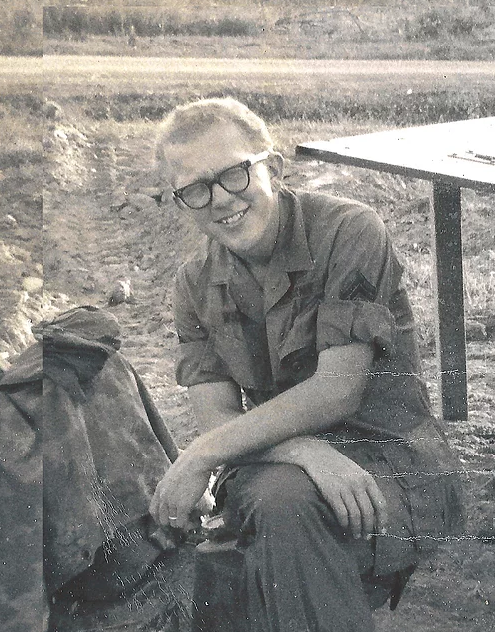
CPL Jerry W. Wickam

2023 - Angel Fire, New Mexico. Angel Fire Vietnam Veterans Memorial commemoration of three MOH recipients from the 11th Armored Cavalry Regiment.

2025 - Arlington, Texas. Wickam's original Medal of Honor is donated by his family to the National Medal of Honor Museum along with numerous personal effects, letters, and items he carried with him during the acts for which he was awarded the medal of honor. The Grand Opening was attended by Wickam's widow and son.

== See also ==
- List of Medal of Honor recipients for the Vietnam War
