= Romeas Haek District =

Romeas Haek រមាសហែក
- District (srok)
- Location of Romeas Haek District
- Country: Cambodia
- Province: Svay Rieng
- Communes: 16
- Villages: 204
- Time zone: +7
- Geocode: 2004

Romeas Haek (Khmer: រមាសហែក), lit. 'Rhino torn', is a district located in Svay Rieng Province, Cambodia. The district is subdivided into 16 khums and 204 phums. According to the 1998 census of Cambodia, it had a population of 111,505.
