= Quế Sơn =

- Interactive map of Quế Sơn
- Coordinates: 15.674594582452611°N 108.21934790881949°E
- Country: Vietnam
- Region: South Central Coast and Central Highlands
- Municipality: Da Nang
- Administrative headquarters: 02 Trưng Nữ Vương Street

Area
  - Total: 94.1 km^{2} (36.3 sq mi)

Population (2025)
  - Total: 34,122
  - Density: 362/km^{2} (940/sq mi)
- Website: queson.danang.gov.vn

Quế Sơn is a commune in the municipality of Da Nang, Vietnam.

On 16 June 2025:

- District-level administrative units nationwide were dissolved.
- The entire area and population of Đông Phú township and the communes of Quế Minh, Quế An, Quế Long, and Quế Phong, formerly part of Quế Sơn district in the former Quảng Nam province, were merged to form a new commune named Quế Sơn.
