= Tam Tri =

Vietnamese-born musician (1924–2002)

Thomas Thanh Van Le (Le Van Thanh or Le Thanh Tri in Vietnamese) known as Tám Trí (Vietnam, December 22, 1924 - Santa Ana, California September 18, 2002) was a Vietnamese-born musician.

== International Performances ==
He emigrated to the United States in 1981.

He was one of the most respected musicians in the traditional cai luong musical style and traveled to Vietnamese communities (known as Little Saigons) throughout the United States, Europe, and Australia. During the 1980s his daughter, Ngoc Tran Thi Le (now Nicole Lê Hudson) would join him. He cohosted a daytime show on Orange County's "Little Saigon Radio" once a week between 2000 and 2002.

== Musical Influences ==
Tam Tri was born in southern Vietnam near the city of Rach Gia to a family of musicians. Tam Tri mastered most of the Vietnamese traditional musical instruments one at a time, including the zither, plucked lutes, bowed instruments, flutes, drums and gongs. He also played violin, acoustic guitar and electric guitar. He kept rhythm with the Asian style metronome, the Song Lang.

== Recordings ==
In 2000, he had a Compact Disc released on Westminster, CA's label Song Lang music, run by his son Tai, whose stage name is Simon LeVan.

== Family ==
Tam Tri is survived by his wife and 11 children (one in Vietnam, one in Canada, and nine in the United States). Simon LeVan has released two albums as a member of the Vietnamese flamenco group "The Kings."
