= List of living Medal of Honor recipients =

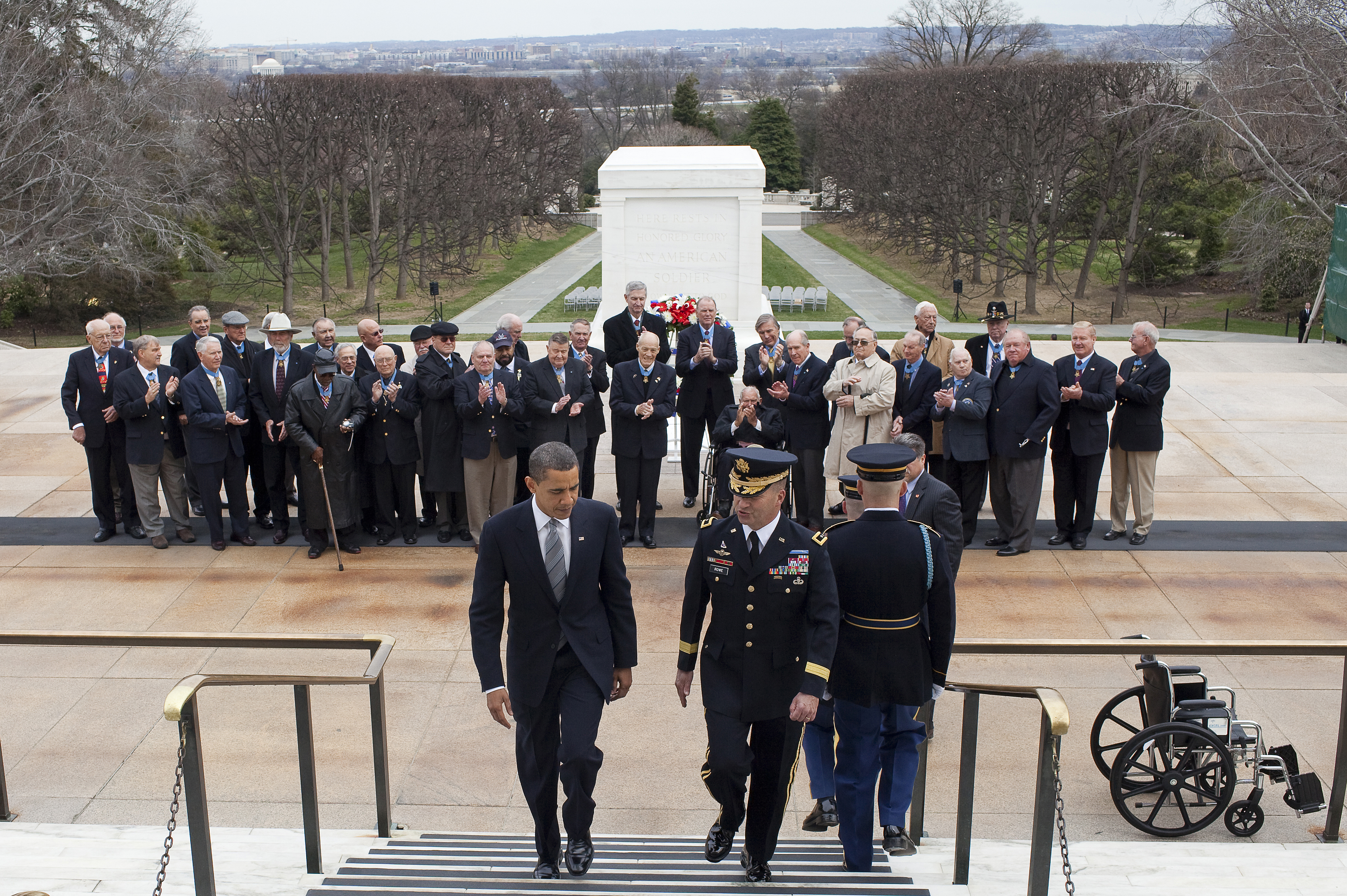
President Barack Obama meets with recipients at the National Medal of Honor Day ceremony at the Tomb of the Unknowns on March 25, 2009

There are currently 65 living recipients of the United States military's highest decoration, the Medal of Honor. The Medal of Honor is bestowed upon a member of the United States armed forces who distinguishes themselves "conspicuously by gallantry and intrepidity at the risk of his life above and beyond the call of duty while engaged in an action against an enemy of the United States."

Of the 65 living recipients, one earned his medal in the Korean War, 46 in the Vietnam War, 15 in the War in Afghanistan, two in the War in Iraq, and one in Operation Absolute Resolve. One earned his medal while serving in the U.S. Air Force, 46 in the U.S. Army, nine in the U.S. Marine Corps, and nine in the U.S. Navy. The oldest recipient is Royce Williams, aged 101, whereas the youngest is Kyle Carpenter, aged 37. Army aviator Eric Slover is the only recipient still in active duty, as well as the most recent recipient. Among the living recipients are former U.S. Senator Bob Kerrey and three retired generals: Patrick Henry Brady and Robert F. Foley of the Army and James E. Livingston of the Marine Corps.

== Medal of Honor ==
The Medal of Honor was created during the American Civil War and is the highest military decoration presented by the United States government to a member of its armed forces. The recipient must have distinguished themselves at the risk of their own life above and beyond the call of duty in action against an enemy of the United States. Due to these requirements, it has frequently been presented posthumously.

== Korean War ==
Image	Name	Branch	Birth date	Reference
	Royce Williams	Navy	April 4, 1925 (age 101)	

== Vietnam War ==
During the Vietnam War and in the following twelve months, 235 Medals of Honor were awarded. Since 1978, a further 37 awards have been presented.

Image	Name	Branch	Birth date and age	Reference
	John Baca	Army	January 10, 1949 (age 77)	
	Donald E. Ballard	Navy	December 5, 1945 (age 80)	
	Harvey C. Barnum, Jr.	Marine Corps	July 21, 1940 (age 86)	
	Dwight W. Birdwell	Army	January 19, 1948 (age 78)	
Portrait of a dark-haired white man wearing a military uniform with many ribbons, pins, and badges.	Patrick Henry Brady	Army	October 1, 1936 (age 90)	
	James C. Capers Jr.	Marine Corps	August 25, 1937 (age 89)	
	Kenneth J. David	Army	21 January 1950 (age 76)	
	Paris Davis	Army	May 13, 1939 (age 87)	
	Sammy L. Davis	Army	November 1, 1946 (age 80)	
Profile of a white man with a full, gray beard wearing a star-shaped medal from a blue ribbon around his neck.	Drew Dennis Dix	Army	December 14, 1944 (age 81)	
	John J. Duffy	Army	March 16, 1938 (age 88)	
	Frederick Edgar Ferguson	Army	August 18, 1939 (age 87)	
	Michael John Fitzmaurice	Army	March 9, 1950 (age 76)	
	James P. Fleming	Air Force	March 12, 1943 (age 83)	
Portrait of a middle-aged white man in a formal military uniform in front of a U.S. flag	Robert F. Foley	Army	May 30, 1941 (age 85)	
	Harold A. Fritz	Army	February 21, 1944 (age 82)	
	Dennis Fujii	Army	March 1, 1949 (age 77)	
	Robert R. Ingram	Navy	January 20, 1945 (age 81)	
	Jack H. Jacobs	Army	August 2, 1945 (age 81)	
	Don J. Jenkins	Army	April 18, 1948 (age 78)	
Head of a white man in a suit with a medal hanging from a blue ribbon around his neck	Thomas G. Kelley	Navy	May 13, 1939 (age 87)	
	Allan J. Kellogg	Marine Corps	October 1, 1943 (age 83)	
Head and torso of a white man in a dark suit speaking and gesturing	Bob Kerrey	Navy	August 27, 1943 (age 83)	
	Peter C. Lemon	Army	June 5, 1950 (age 76)	
	Gary L. Littrell	Army	October 26, 1944 (age 82)	
	James E. Livingston	Marine Corps	January 12, 1940 (age 86)	
	Allen James Lynch	Army	October 28, 1945 (age 81)	
	Walter Joseph Marm, Jr.	Army	November 20, 1941 (age 84)	
	James C. McCloughan	Army	April 30, 1946 (age 80)	
Modrzejewski in 2011	Robert J. Modrzejewski	Marine Corps	July 3, 1934 (age 92)	
	Melvin Morris	Army	January 7, 1942 (age 84)	
	Thomas R. Norris	Navy	January 14, 1944 (age 82)	
Head and shoulders of a white man with a pointed mustache, wearing a star-shaped medal on a blue ribbon around his neck.	Robert Emmett O'Malley	Marine Corps	June 3, 1943 (age 83)	
Patterson in 2012	Robert Martin Patterson	Army	April 16, 1948 (age 78)	
Profile of a dark-haired man with a star-shaped medal hanging from his neck	Alfred V. Rascon	Army	September 10, 1945 (age 81)	
	Ronald E. Ray	Army	December 7, 1941 (age 84)	
	Terry P. Richardson	Army	January 8, 1948 (age 78)	
	Gordon Ray Roberts	Army	June 14, 1950 (age 76)	
	Jose Rodela	Army	June 15, 1937 (age 89)	
A color image showing 2nd Lieutenant Gary M. Rose from the chest up in his military uniform with ribbons.	Gary M. Rose	Army	October 17, 1947 (age 79)	
	James M. Sprayberry	Army	April 24, 1947 (age 79)	
	James Allen Taylor	Army	December 31, 1937 (age 88)	
	Brian Thacker	Army	April 25, 1945 (age 81)	
	Michael E. Thornton	Navy	March 23, 1949 (age 77)	
	Jay R. Vargas	Marine Corps	July 29, 1938 (age 88)	
	Gary Wetzel	Army	September 29, 1947 (age 79)	

== War in Afghanistan ==
The War in Afghanistan began on October 7, 2001 and was the beginning of the Global War on Terrorism. The war was launched by the United States, the United Kingdom, and NATO allies in response to the September 11, 2001 attacks. The stated purpose of the invasion was to capture Osama bin Laden, destroy al-Qaeda, and remove the Taliban regime which had provided support and safe harbor to al-Qaeda. Since 2001, 21 U.S. servicemen have received the Medal of Honor for actions in Afghanistan, six of them posthumously.

Image	Name	Branch	Birth date and age	Reference
	Edward Byers	Navy	August 4, 1979 (age 47)	
	Kyle Carpenter	Marine Corps	October 17, 1989 (age 37)	
	Ty Carter	Army	January 25, 1980 (age 46)	
	Nicholas Dockery	Army	October 3, 1981 (age 45)	
Head and torso portrait of a young white man in a formal military uniform with a U.S. flag in the background	Salvatore Giunta	Army	January 21, 1985 (age 41)	
Captain Florent Groberg	Florent Groberg	Army	May 8, 1983 (age 43)	
	Dakota Meyer	Marine Corps	June 26, 1988 (age 38)	
Leroy Petry	Leroy Petry	Army	July 29, 1979 (age 47)	
	Ryan M. Pitts	Army	October 1, 1985 (age 41)	
	Earl Plumlee	Army	April 6, 1980 (age 46)	
	Clinton Romesha	Army	August 17, 1981 (age 45)	
	Britt K. Slabinski	Navy	December 1, 1969 (age 56)	
	William D. Swenson	Army	November 2, 1978 (age 48)	
Sergeant Kyle J. White	Kyle White	Army	March 27, 1987 (age 39)	
	Matthew O. Williams	Army	October 3, 1981 (age 45)	

== Iraq War ==
Seven Iraq War veterans have received the Medal of Honor, five of them posthumously.

Image	Name	Branch	Birth date and age	Reference
	David Bellavia	Army	November 10, 1975 (age 51)	
Sgt. Maj. Thomas "Patrick" Payne	Thomas Payne	Army	April 2, 1984 (age 42)	

== Operation Absolute Resolve ==
Image	Name	Branch	Birth date and age	Reference
	Eric Slover	Army		

== Recently deceased ==
Recipients who died within the last twelve months are listed below.

Image	Name	Branch	Conflict	Birth date	Death date	Place of death	Reference
Crandall in 2012	Bruce P. Crandall	Army	Vietnam War	February 17, 1933	May 31, 2026 (aged 93)	Tempe, Arizona	
