= KID (AM) =

Radio station in Idaho Falls, Idaho

Coordinates: 43°33′35″N 111°55′15″W

- Idaho Falls, Idaho; United States
- Broadcast area: Idaho Falls, Idaho
- Frequency: 590 kHz
- Branding: KID Newsradio

Programming
- Format: News/talk
- Affiliations: Fox News Radio; Compass Media Networks; Premiere Networks

Ownership
- Owner: Rich Broadcasting; (Rich Broadcasting Idaho LS, LLC)

History
- First air date: December 3, 1928
- Last air date: February 23, 2023
- Former call signs: KGIO (1928–1929)
- Call sign meaning: Idaho

Technical information
- Facility ID: 22194
- Class: B
- Power: 5,000 watts day; 1,000 watts night
- Repeaters: 92.1 KIDG (Pocatello); 106.3 KIDJ (Sugar City)

KID (590 kHz) was a commercial AM radio station located in Idaho Falls, Idaho, broadcasting on 590 AM. KID aired news/talk programming, which included syndicated programs like Sean Hannity, Glenn Beck, and Ben Shapiro.

== History ==
The station was first licensed, as KGIO, on November 11, 1928, on a frequency of 1320 kHz, and began broadcasting on December 3, 1928. The original call letters were randomly assigned from an alphabetical list of available call signs, and were changed to KID on February 16, 1929. In March 1941, most of the stations on 1320 kHz, including KID, moved to 1350 kHz, with the implementation of the North American Regional Broadcasting Agreement. In 1950, KID changed to its final frequency 590 kHz.

In October 2007, a deal was reached for KID to be acquired by GAP Broadcasting II LLC (Samuel Weller, president) from Clear Channel Communications as part of a 57-station deal with a total reported sale price of $74.78 million. What eventually became GapWest Broadcasting was folded into Townsquare Media on August 13, 2010; Townsquare, in turn, sold its Idaho Falls–Pocatello stations to Rich Broadcasting in 2011.

In its final years, KID simulcast its programming on two FM stations, KIDJ in Sugar City (serving Idaho Falls and Rexburg) and KIDG in Pocatello. They served to fill in gaps in the AM station's nighttime signal. KID operated at 5,000 watts during the day, but was required to drop to 1,000 watts at night.

=== Shutdown ===
KID had long operated from a three-tower site in Iona, Idaho. A single tower beamed the transmitter's full power during the day, while at night power was fed to all three towers in a directional pattern to protect other stations on 590 AM and adjacent frequencies.

The station went off the air in November 2021, when a farmer accidentally clipped the guy wire for one of its towers and brought the tower down. Rich Broadcasting president and namesake Rich Mecham later told The Post Register that he only learned about the collapse when one of his employees drove by and noticed one of the towers was down. The station returned to the air in 2022 under special temporary authority operating at 1,000 watts around the clock.

Rich Broadcasting applied for an insurance settlement in hopes of rebuilding the fallen tower. However, after spending almost a year hammering out the terms, Mecham received a letter from Arthur Clark, who owned the property that KID was leasing for the transmitter, stating that he had collected an insurance payment as well. Clark also claimed that he owned the transmitter site, and would not replace the fallen tower since Rich Broadcasting was at the tail end of its lease. Mecham went to court to dispute Clark's claims. He argued that he had paid rent and property taxes on the towers for years. He added that federal and state authorities, as well as the tower registration company, had long recognized KID as the transmitter site's owner. Mecham said that if Clark's claim to onwership was legitimate, he would be charging Rich Broadcasting "a small fortune" in rent.

While Mecham and Clark argued over who owned the towers, Clark demolished the two remaining towers on the site as well as the transmitter building, and also removed all of the station's equipment. Mecham was shocked that Clark was willing to destroy "a million and a half dollars worth of equipment," and claimed in court that Clark's actions cost the station substantial advertising revenue and hindered its ratings and contractual relationships. Clark claimed that he had been forced to destroy the towers due to safety concerns, and Rich Broadcasting had not given any assurances that a remedy was forthcoming. Mecham realized that rebuilding KID's AM facility would have meant leasing another transmitter site, building a new facility, and replacing the destroyed equipment. He also faced the expense of renewing the AM station's license. He estimated that it would have cost $1.5 to $2 million to rebuild KID's pre-accident facility, an expense that he did not feel he could justify "in today's radio environment." Mecham considered applying to change KID's license to a single-tower configuration at 1,000 watts, but this would have resulted in a footprint that would have largely overlapped the FM satellites' footprints. Concluding that the nostalgic value of a heritage radio station with a three-letter callsign was outweighed by the expense of replacing the transmitter facility, Mecham decided to return the 590 AM license to the Federal Communications Commission. Rich Broadcasting formally surrendered the KID license on February 23, 2023, and the FCC deleted it on March 3. The station's former schedule continued to air on KIDJ and KIDG under the "KID Newsradio" branding.
