= Rodney J. Evans =

Rodney John Evans
- Born: July 17, 1948; Chelsea, Massachusetts, U.S.
- Died: July 18, 1969 (aged 21); Tây Ninh Province, South Vietnam
- Burial place: Liberty Hill Cemetery, Florala, Alabama
- Military career
- Allegiance: United States
- Branch: United States Army
- Service years: 1966–69
- Rank: Sergeant
- Units: Company D, 1st Battalion, 12th Cavalry Regiment, 1st Cavalry Division
- Conflicts: Vietnam War: Operation Toan Thang III †
- Awards: Medal of Honor; Purple Heart

Rodney John Evans (July 17, 1948 – July 18, 1969) was a Sergeant in the United States Army's 1st battalion of the 12th Cavalry Regiment, 1st Cavalry Division. Evans was killed in action during the Vietnam War in Tây Ninh Province. He died protecting other members of his unit from a concealed land mine using his own body, for which he received the Medal of Honor.

== Biography ==
Rodney Evans was the adopted son of the Evans family of Florala, Alabama. His parents owned a dry cleaning business. After joining the US Army, he married his high school sweetheart, Barbara Geohagan. Evans was then sent to Vietnam and successfully completed a full tour of duty.

Upon his return to the United States, he was stationed at Fort Rucker, Alabama, not far from where he grew up. Due to financial constraints his wife lived with her parents and would drive up to Fort Rucker on weekends to pick him up and take him home.

On Thursday, September 5, 1968, Barbara was killed in a car accident after going to Ft Rucker to take care of some business. She lost control of her car. Evans became very depressed, re-enlisted and volunteered for another tour in Vietnam. It took over a year for his papers to be processed and for Evans to receive orders for his return to Vietnam. By then, with the help of close friends he had come to grips with his loss. Shortly before his return to Vietnam, Rodney told friends and his twin brother, Wyman, he no longer wanted to die and regretted re-upping for Vietnam. After he had left for Vietnam, the Dunn family (with whom he and Wyman lived after Army enlistment and again after Barbara's death) petitioned legislators and the Army to cut short Evans' tour of duty due to the reasons he re-upped—that he was under mental duress. The Dunn's received a call from Evans shortly before his death, while he was on a short "rest and relaxation" break. He was so grateful for the efforts. The word came from one legislator that Evans' paperwork was being processed and, indeed, he would be returned. It would take a few weeks, but he would be released from the commitment. Less than a week later, Evans was killed in action during Operation Toan Thang III.

Rodney Evans died one day after his twenty-first birthday and is buried in Liberty Hill Cemetery, Florala, Alabama. His name can be found on Panel 20W - Row 014 of the Vietnam Memorial Wall in Washington, D.C..

Two other Medal of Honor recipients, Allen J. Lynch (1967) and John Baca (1970) served in Company D, 1st Battalion, 12th Cavalry, 1st Cavalry Division.

== Medal of Honor citation ==
Rank and organization: Sergeant, U.S. Army, Company D, 1st Battalion, 12th Cavalry, 1st Cavalry Division. Place and date: Tay Ninh Province, Republic of Vietnam, July 18, 1969. Entered service at: Montgomery, Ala. Born: July 17, 1948, Chelsea, Mass.

Citation:

For conspicuous gallantry and intrepidity in action at the risk of his life above and beyond the call of duty. Sgt. Evans distinguished himself by extraordinary heroism while serving as a squad leader in a reconnaissance sweep through heavy vegetation to reconnoiter a strong enemy position. As the force approached a well-defined trail, the platoon scout warned that the trail was booby-trapped. Sgt. Evans led his squad on a route parallel to the trail. The force had started to move forward when a nearby squad was hit by the blast of a concealed mine. Looking to his right Sgt. Evans saw a second enemy device. With complete disregard for his safety he shouted a warning to his men, dived to the ground and crawled toward the mine. Just as he reached it an enemy soldier detonated the explosive and Sgt. Evans absorbed the full impact with his body. His gallant and selfless action saved his comrades from probable death or injury and served as an inspiration to his entire unit. Sgt. Evans' gallantry in action at the cost of his life were in keeping with the highest traditions of the military service and reflect great credit upon himself, his unit, and the U.S. Army.

== Namesake ==
- "Google Maps". A street was named in Rodney Evans' honor in his hometown of Florala, Alabama
- A Softball Complex at Fort Hood, the current home of the 1st Cavalry Division, was named in Rodney Evans honor.

== See also ==
- List of Medal of Honor recipients
- List of Medal of Honor recipients for the Vietnam War
