= KPPC =

KPPC may refer to:

- KPPC-LP, a low-power radio station (96.9 FM) licensed to serve San Antonio, Texas, United States
- KBEX (FM), a radio station (96.3 FM) licensed to serve Dalhart, Texas, which held the call sign KPPC from January 2010 to August 2011
- KIDG, a radio station (92.1 FM) licensed to serve Pocatello, Idaho, United States, which held the call sign KPPC from June 2003 to March 2008
- KPPC (AM), a radio station (1240 AM) which operated between 1924 and 1996 in Pasadena, California
- KROQ-FM, a radio station (106.7 FM) licensed to serve Pasadena, California, United States, which formerly used the call sign KPPC-FM
- Kings Park Psychiatric Center, the former New York state-run psychiatric hospital
