= KEGE =

KEGE may refer to:

- KEGE (FM), a radio station (101.7 FM) licensed to serve Hamilton City, California, United States
- KIDG, a radio station (92.1 FM) licensed to serve Pocatello, Idaho, United States, which held the call sign KEGE from 2008 to 2015
- KXXR, a radio station (93.7 FM) licensed to serve Minneapolis, Minnesota, United States, which held the call sign KEGE-FM from June 1994 to September 1994
- Eagle County Regional Airport (ICAO code KEGE)
