= Thomas C. Neibaur =

United States Army Medal of Honor recipient (1898–1942)

Thomas Croft Neibaur
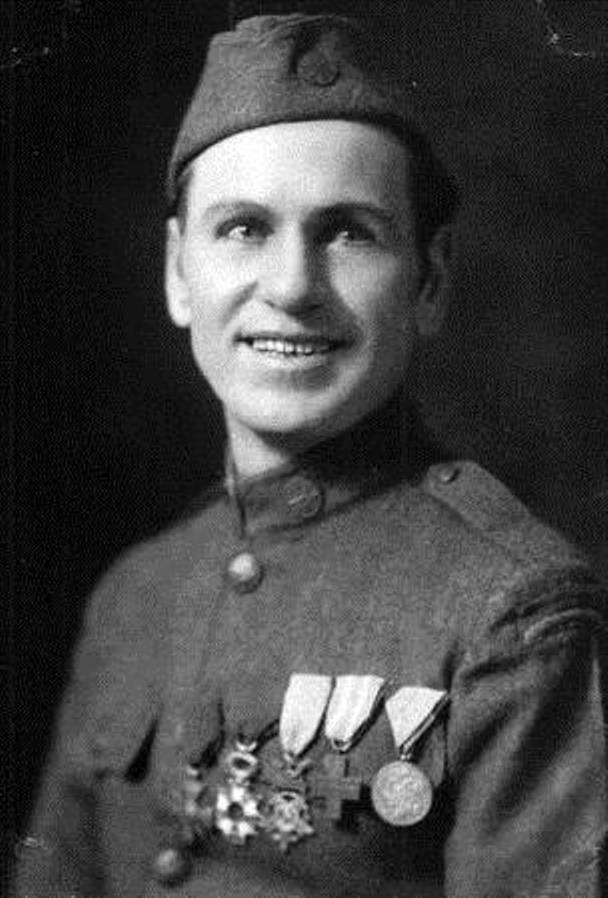
- Neibaur poses with several of his foreign awards and decorations
- Born: May 17, 1898; Sharon, Bear Lake County, Idaho, US
- Died: December 23, 1942 (aged 44); Walla Walla, Washington, US
- Burial place: Sugar City Cemetery, Sugar City, Idaho, US
- Military career
- Allegiance: United States of America
- Branch: United States Army
- Service years: 1917–1919
- Rank: Private
- Units: 167th Infantry Regiment, 42nd Infantry Division
- Conflicts: World War I
- Awards: United States of America: Medal of Honor; Purple Heart; World War I Victory Medal; France: Légion d'honneur - Chevalier; (Legion of Honor); Croix de Guerre (Cross of War); Italy: La Croce al Merito di Guerra (War Merit Cross); Montenegro: Военная медаль за храбрость - Silver Medal for Military Bravery

Thomas Croft Neibaur (May 17, 1898 – December 23, 1942) was the first Latter-day Saint (Mormon) to receive the Medal of Honor. He was also the first soldier from Idaho to be awarded the Medal of Honor. Neibaur was an automatic rifleman who served in France during World War I. On October 16, 1918, while in battle at Côté de Chatillion, while trying to eliminate a machine gun nest, Neibaur became surrounded by 15 German soldiers. With a pistol, Neibaur killed four, and captured eleven. He received six medals for his bravery and heroic exploits, as well as the Purple Heart.

Afflicted by the Great Depression, Neibaur had little money and could not feed his family, which caused him to send his medals to Congress with a note stating, "I cannot eat them." Neibaur died three years later of tuberculosis. Thomas C. Neibaur Veteran Park was dedicated in Sugar City, Idaho with a monument commemorating Neibaur. His war medals are held by the Idaho State Historical Society.

== Family and early life ==
Thomas Neibaur was born in Sharon, Bear Lake County, Idaho, the ninth of ten children of James C. Neibaur (1862–1938) and Elizabeth Croft Neibaur (1863–1938). . When he was eleven years old, the family moved to Teton, near Sugar City, Idaho. Thomas and his father worked in the large sugar beet factory built in 1903, the namesake of Sugar City. Neibaur had strong family heritage in the Church of Jesus Christ of Latter-day Saints (LDS Church) beginning with his great-grandfather, Alexander Neibaur (1808–1883), an immigrant from Alsace-Lorraine who graduated from medical and dental university training in Berlin, and was fluent in several languages. Thomas' grandfather, Joseph W. Neibaur (1835–1927), settled in Paris, Idaho in the 1880s. In August 1907, Neibaur was baptized into the LDS Church. Though his parents and family remained faithful members of the LDS Church, Neibaur drifted from active participation. He always considered himself a believer in God, though he maintained he was not religious. Even though he was not an active member of the LDS Church, he maintained connections to it because of his family.

== Military service ==
Neibaur enlisted in the Idaho National Guard on March 30, 1917, a week before the April 6 United States declaration of war against Germany. He was inducted into federal service on April 8. He served in the Rocky Mountain northwest, guarding tunnels and railroad bridges until October 1917 when he and his 2nd Idaho Infantry Regiment were ordered to Camp Mills, Long Island. Neibaur became an automatic rifleman in the newly organized 41st Division. After completing training and organization at Camp Merritt, New Jersey, the division deployed to France, where it provided replacement troops for other units of the American Expeditionary Force (AEF). Neibaur was assigned to Company M, 167th Infantry Regiment of the 42nd Division. The 167th was originally the 4th Regiment of the Alabama National Guard, but as with all units during the war, its 4,000 men represented several states, and were drawn from the regular army, national guard and draftees.

== Campaigns and battles ==
Neibaur was a private and served as an automatic rifleman using the French manufactured Chauchat 8mm automatic rifle using a "banana clip" of 20 rounds. In February he went into the lines on the Lunéville sector, and then later in March at the Baccarat sector. He did not see any real combat except for artillery fire until March 1918, once the German "Ludendorff Offensive" commenced on March 21, 1918. He served on the Somme River where the 42nd Division was part of the French 7th Army.

In June, more American divisions entered the front lines and Neibaur fought in several engagements through August 1918, including the Third Battle of the Aisne, Second Battle of the Marne, and Champagne-Marne. As with any infantry regiment, brigade or division, the units rotated and relieved one another on a routine basis. During this time, Neibaur was temporarily incapacitated by a German mustard gas attack.

In August, Brigadier General Douglas MacArthur assumed command of the 84th Infantry Brigade, which consisted of Neibaur's 167th Infantry Regiment and the Iowa National Guard's 168th Infantry Regiment. In early September General John Pershing, commander of the AEF, received permission to "reduce" the salient at Saint-Mihiel, southeast of Verdun. Beginning on September 12, 1918, the First United States Army under Pershing commenced an offensive, the first independent American offensive in its own sector of the Western Front. Within days, the crumbling German army was thrown back and the salient was reduced causing a "straightening" of the front line.

On September 26, the Americans launched their second offensive between the Argonne Forest on the left and Meuse River on the right. By October 14, the 42nd Division was stalled along the strongly defended Kreimehilde "stellung" (German for position or line). Unlike the Saint-Mihiel, the Germans conducted an aggressive and spirited defense. The two main terrain features holding up the Rainbow division's advance were hills: Hill 288 and the Châtillon-sous-les-Côtes. The 167th, specifically Neibaur's 3rd Battalion, received the order on the 15th to attack and capture Châtillon-sous-les-Côtes.

On October 16, 1918, the American attacks captured Còte de Châtillon, though there remained several pockets of German units and many isolated machine gun positions. Neibaur along with two other soldiers, an observer and a loader, volunteered to flank and remove a network of machine guns just over a hundred yards from "M" Company and 3rd Battalion's hastily occupied positions. Crawling up a draw between two spurs, Neibaur's automatic rifle team encountered a wire obstacle and was then fired upon. Neibaur's two team members were killed and he received three wounds in the right thigh. Passing through the wire entanglements he positioned his automatic rifle behind a dirt berm. Some Germans observed his movement and approximately 50 attacked. Neibaur fired some 50 rounds or two and a half clips, killing or wounding most of the Germans.

After his automatic rifle jammed, Neibaur discarded it and tried to crawl or run downhill some 100 yards to friendly lines, during which he was wounded a fourth time, this one in the hip, and fell unconscious. Awaking, he found himself captured by 15 or so Germans who had survived the attack on his previous position. The Germans had to take cover due to the supporting fire from Neibaur's "M" Company. Neibaur then realized that the Germans had dropped on the ground near him his semi-automatic pistol, the Colt made M1911. He crawled to it and as he did so, some of the Germans charged him with bayonets, four of whom he killed immediately with his pistol, and eleven of whom he captured and led to American lines.

== Later life ==
Neibaur spent several months in field hospitals recovering from his wounds. His last wound by a German machine gun bullet remained in his hip the rest of his life. He was the first native-born Idaho resident to be awarded a Medal of Honor, as well as the first member of the Church of Jesus Christ of Latter-day Saints to be awarded a Medal of Honor. Neibaur also represented the first private in the U.S. Army to receive the Medal of Honor. On February 9, 1919, at the AEF headquarters at Chaumont, France, Pershing presented the Medal of Honor to him, along with a dozen other officers and soldiers. Neibaur arrived home at Sugar City, Idaho on May 27, 1919, and was welcomed by a throng of some 10,000 people, celebrating a state-wide holiday proclaimed the governor who was in attendance as "Neibaur Day." In 1919, Pershing included Neibaur in his "Immortal Ten" list of World War I soldiers whose wartime feats best exemplified the traits of heroism and personal courage. (Note: The others were Johannes S. Anderson, Donald M. Call, George Dilboy, Harold A. Furlong, George H. Mallon, Sidney E. Manning, Harold W. Roberts, Charles W. Whittlesey, and Samuel Woodfill. Alvin York was not included because at the time that Pershing wrote, York's exploits were not yet widely known.)

He married Sarah "Lois" Shepard in November 1919; she was six years older than him and had a son from a previous marriage. Together they had nine children. In 1928, Neibaur had an accident at the sugar beet factory where his arm was severely mangled in a cutting machine. Workers had to disassemble the machine to free him. The Neibaurs had three sons who died from accidents: one (18 months old) drowned in an abandoned cesspool; another (two years) was killed by an automobile; and one (six years) died from infection after burning himself on a wood stove.

By 1939, in the last years of the Depression, Neibaur was destitute. As a Medal of Honor recipient, he received a small pension, and he worked as a clerk for the Works Progress Administration (WPA), but his low income left him unable to feed and care for his family. US Senator William Borah of Idaho attempted to pass a law in the US Congress promoting Neibaur to the rank of major in the regular army, and then placing him on the retired list. This failed. Discouraged by his misfortune, Neibaur mailed his Medal of Honor and other decorations to Congress in Washington stating that "I cannot eat them." Local newspapers covered the story. Three days later he secured a position as a night security officer at the state capitol in Boise. His wife Lois died in 1940, at the age of forty-eight from complications of rheumatic fever she had contracted in childhood. Neibaur married Lillian Golden in 1941, and a short time later he entered a veterans' hospital in Walla Walla, Washington for tuberculosis. He died there on December 23, 1942, at the age of forty-four. Four young sons were sent to an orphanage in Eaton Rapids, Michigan. He and Lois are buried in Sugar City, Idaho. His awards and decorations were returned to Mrs. Lillian Neibaur who donated them to the Idaho State Historical Society. Thomas C. Neibaur Veteran Park is located in Sugar City, Idaho with a granite monument commemorating Neibaur.

== Military decorations ==
Individual decorations

United States of America:

- Medal of Honor
- Purple Heart

France:

- Légion d'honneur - Chevalier (Legion of Honor)
- Croix de Guerre (Cross of War)

Italy:

- La Croce al Merito di Guerra (War Merit Cross)

Montenegro:

- Военная медаль за храбрость - Silver Medal for Military Bravery

Service Medal(s):

- World War I Victory Medal with 5 Battle Clasps

Official Campaign Designations:

Information retrieved from Place the Headstones Where They Belong.

Somme Defensive March 21, - April 6, 1918

Aisne May 27, - June 5, 1918 (No clasp on Victory Medal)

Champagne - Marne 15-July 18, 1918

Aisne - Marne July 18, - 6 August 1918

St. Mihiel 12 - September 16, 1918

Meuse - Argonne September 26, - November 11, 1918

== Medal of Honor Citation ==
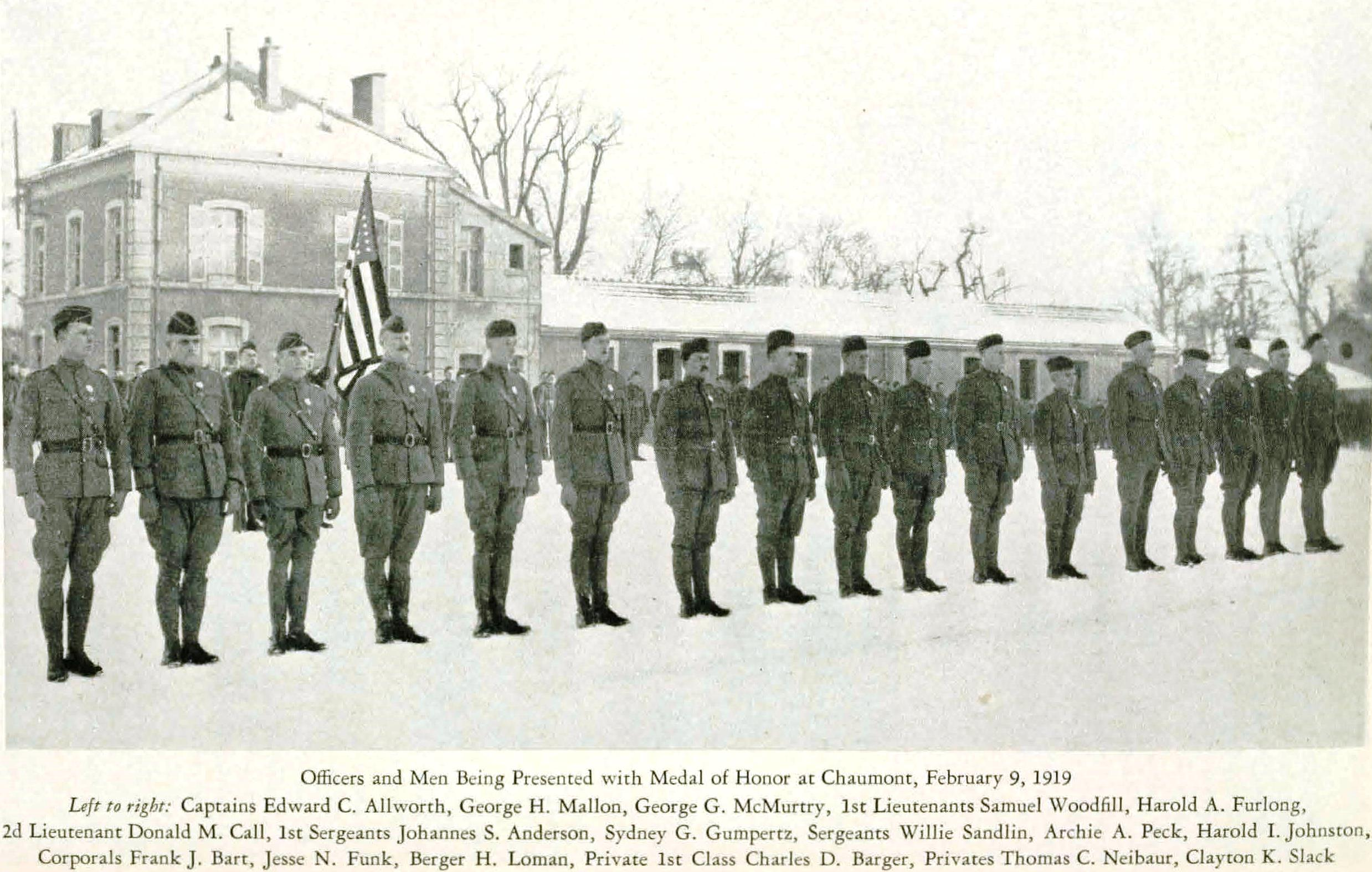
Medal of Honor Presentation Ceremony - February 9, 1919, at Chaumont, France. General John J. Pershing presided.

Information retrieved at Congressional Medal of Honor Society.

- Rank and organization: Private, U.S. Army, Company M, 167th Infantry, 42d Division.
- Place and date: Near Landres-et-St. Georges, France, October 16, 1918.
- Entered service at: Sugar City, Idaho.
- Born: May 17, 1898, Sharon, Idaho.
- General Orders No.118, War Department, 1918.

Citation:

On the afternoon of 16 October 1918, when the Cote-de-Chatillion had just been gained after bitter fighting and the summit of that strong bulwark in the Kriemhilde Stellung was being organized, Pvt. Neibaur was sent out on patrol with his automatic rifle squad to enfilade enemy machinegun nests. As he gained the ridge he set up his automatic rifle and was directly thereafter wounded in both legs by fire from a hostile machinegun on his flank. The advance wave of the enemy troops, counterattacking, had about gained the ridge, and although practically cut off and surrounded, the remainder of his detachment being killed or wounded, this gallant soldier kept his automatic rifle in operation to such effect that by his own efforts and by fire from the skirmish line of his company, at least 100 yards in his rear, the attack was checked. The enemy wave being halted and Iying prone, 4 of the enemy attacked Pvt. Neibaur at close quarters. These he killed. He then moved alone among the enemy Iying on the ground about him, in the midst of the fire from his own lines, and by coolness and gallantry captured 11 prisoners at the point of his pistol and, although painfully wounded, brought them back to our lines. The counterattack in full force was arrested to a large extent by the single efforts of this soldier, whose heroic exploits took place against the skyline in full view of his entire battalion.

== See also ==
- List of Medal of Honor recipients for World War I
- Charles Liteky, also returned his Medal of Honor in protest
