= Dwight H. Johnson =

United States Army soldier (1947–1971)

Dwight Hal Johnson
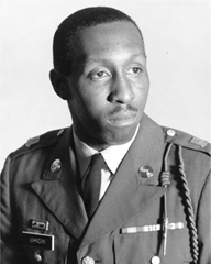
- Born: May 7, 1947; Detroit, Michigan, U.S.
- Died: April 30, 1971 (aged 23); Detroit, Michigan, U.S.
- Burial place: Arlington National Cemetery, Arlington County, Virginia, U.S.
- Military career
- Allegiance: United States
- Branch: United States Army
- Service years: 1967–1971
- Rank: Sergeant
- Nickname: "Skip"
- Units: Company B, 1st Battalion, 69th Armor
- Conflicts: Vietnam War
- Awards: Medal of Honor

Dwight Hal Johnson (May 7, 1947 – April 30, 1971) a native of Detroit, Michigan, was a United States Army soldier who received the Medal of Honor for his actions in January 1968 during the Vietnam War.

== Early life ==
Johnson was born on May 7, 1947, and lived in the E. J. Jeffries Homes, a housing project in Detroit, Michigan. He never knew his father, and his mother raised Dwight and his younger brother by herself.

== Military service ==
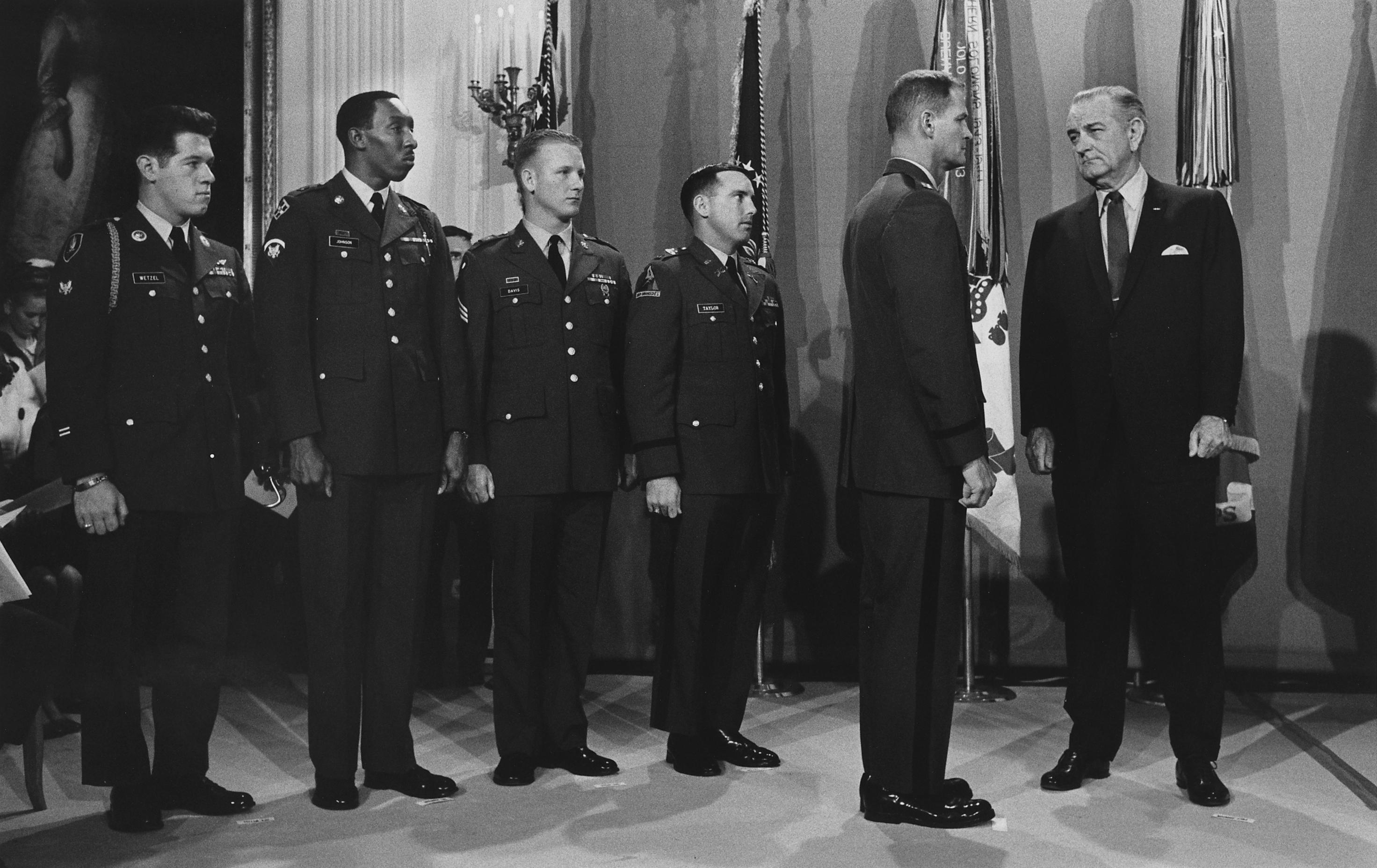
Sammy L. Davis receiving the Medal of Honor from President Lyndon B. Johnson on November 19, 1968, along with four fellow recipients: Gary Wetzel, Dwight H. Johnson, James Allen Taylor, and Angelo Liteky.

Drafted to serve in the United States Army in Vietnam, he was a member of Company B, 1st Battalion, 69th Armor, 4th Infantry Division.

== Medal of Honor citation ==
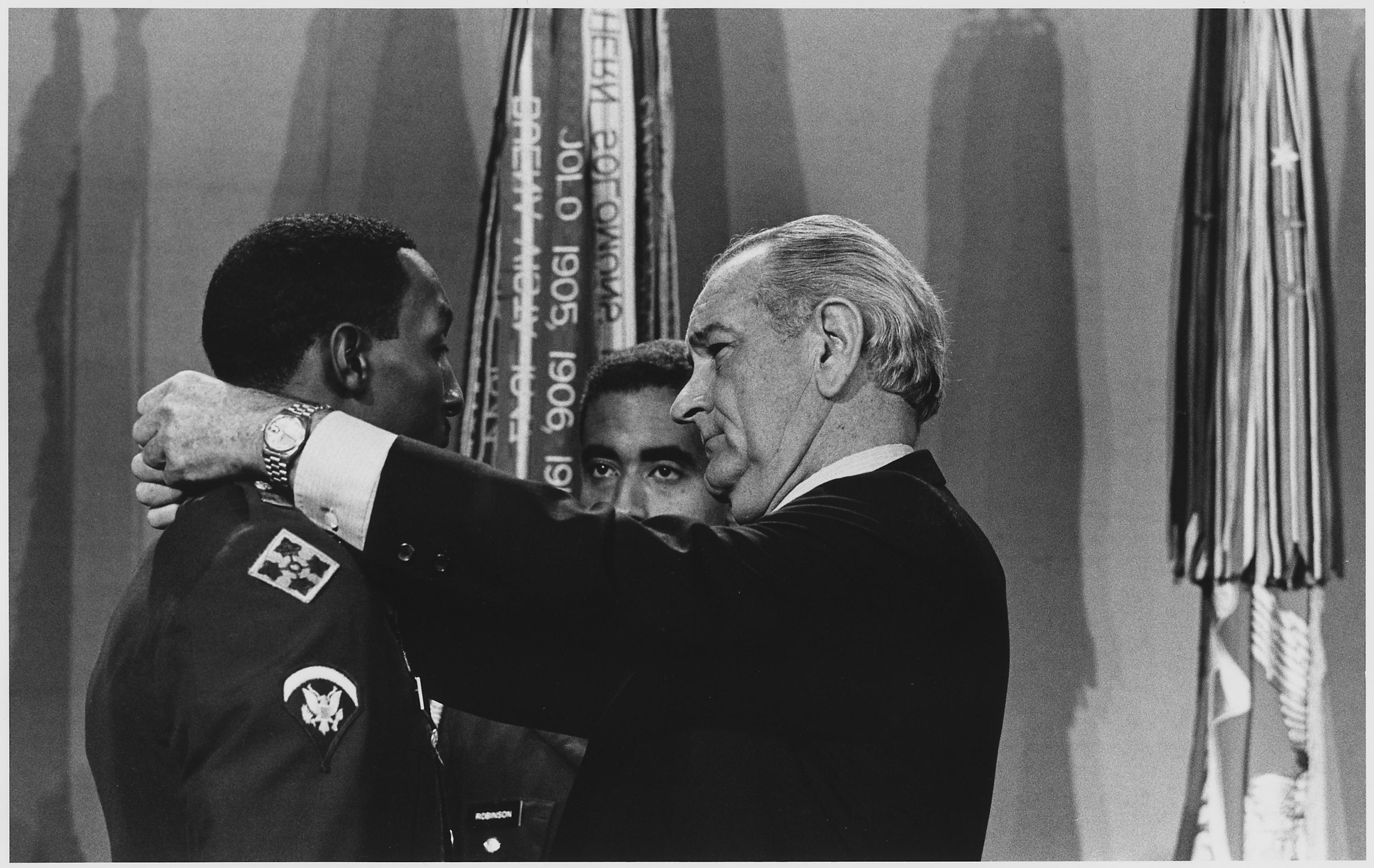
Johnson receives the Medal of Honor from President Lyndon B. Johnson on November 19, 1968

For conspicuous gallantry and intrepidity at the risk of his life above and beyond the call of duty. Specialist 5 Johnson, a tank driver with Company B, was a member of a reaction force moving to aid other elements of his platoon, which was in heavy contact with a battalion size North Vietnamese force. Specialist Johnson's tank, upon reaching the point of contact, threw a track and became immobilized. Realizing that he could do no more as a driver, he climbed out of the vehicle, armed only with a .45 caliber pistol. Despite intense hostile fire, Specialist Johnson killed several enemy soldiers before he had expended his ammunition. Returning to his tank through a heavy volume of antitank rocket, small arms and automatic weapons fire, he obtained a sub-machine gun with which to continue his fight against the advancing enemy. Armed with this weapon, Specialist Johnson again braved deadly enemy fire to return to the center of the ambush site where he courageously eliminated more of the determined foe. Engaged in extremely close combat when the last of his ammunition was expended, he killed an enemy soldier with the stock end of his submachine gun. Now weaponless, Specialist Johnson ignored the enemy fire around him, climbed into his platoon sergeant's tank, extricated a wounded crewmember and carried him to an armored personnel carrier. He then returned to the same tank and assisted in firing the main gun until it jammed. In a magnificent display of courage, Specialist Johnson exited the tank and again armed only with a .45 caliber pistol, he engaged several North Vietnamese troops in close proximity to the vehicle. Fighting his way through devastating fire and remounting his own immobilized tank, he remained fully exposed to the enemy as he bravely and skillfully engaged them with the tank's externally-mounted .50 caliber machine gun; where he remained until the situation was brought under control. Specialist Johnson's profound concern for his fellow soldiers, at the risk of his life above and beyond the call of duty are in keeping with the highest traditions of the military service and reflect great credit upon himself and the United States Army.

== Post War years ==
After returning from Vietnam, Johnson had difficulty adjusting to his post war role. Until he was bestowed with the Medal of Honor, he had trouble finding work and got into great debt. After receiving the medal, he went back to the Army and worked as a recruiter and made public relations appearances. When he began missing appointments and speaking engagements, he was sent for medical evaluation, at which he was diagnosed with a depression caused by post-Vietnam adjustment problems, often referred to now as Post-Traumatic Stress Disorder (PTSD).

== Death ==
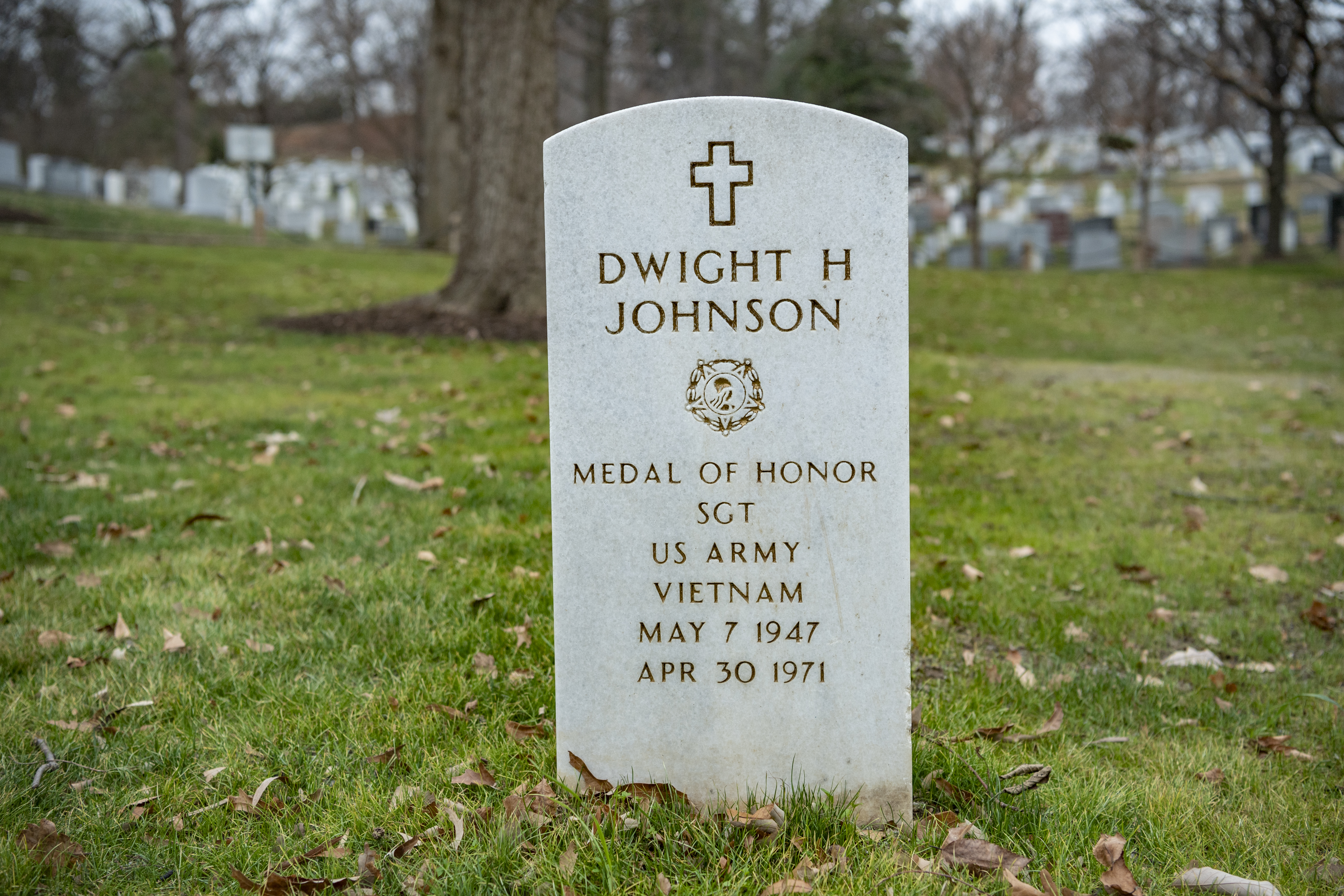
Grave at Arlington National Cemetery

Just after 11:30 p.m. on April 29, 1971, Johnson was shot after entering an Open Pantry convenience store 1-mile (1.6 km) from his home, drawing a .22 caliber revolver from under his topcoat and demanding money from the cashier at the front of the store. The store owner was in the back office, responding to Johnson's demand for the money, when shots were fired. The owner was hit in the left bicep and returned fire with a .38 Special revolver. Seven shots were fired. Johnson sustained four bullet wounds, three to the chest and one to the face, and died on the operating table at 4 a.m. on April 30. He was buried at Arlington National Cemetery on May 6, 1971, in Section 31 Lot 471. Johnson's mother said: "Sometimes I wonder if Skip was tired of this life and needed someone else to pull the trigger".

== Media ==
Two plays have been written about Johnson's tragic life, the second of which was also produced and shown on PBS:

- Strike Heaven on the Face by Richard Wesley
- The Medal of Honor Rag by Tom Cole

The poet Michael S. Harper also wrote a poetry series in 1973 titled Debridement.

One song has been written about Johnson's tragic life (with some "poetic license"):

- Bummer by Harry Chapin, on Portrait Gallery, Elektra Entertainment, 1975.

== See also ==
- List of Medal of Honor recipients
- List of Medal of Honor recipients for the Vietnam War
- Lembcke, Jerry. The Spitting Image. New York: New York University Press, 1998.
