= Charles Liteky =

United States Army Medal of Honor recipient

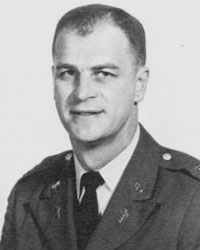
- Born: Charles James Liteky; February 14, 1931; Washington, D.C.
- Died: January 20, 2017 (aged 85); San Francisco, California
- Burial place: Golden Gate National Cemetery, San Bruno, California
- Other name: Angelo Liteky
- Military career
- Allegiance: United States
- Branch: United States Army
- Service years: 1966–1971
- Rank: Major (Chaplain)
- Units: 12th Infantry Regiment, 199th Infantry Brigade
- Conflicts: Vietnam War
- Awards: Medal of Honor (Renounced in 1986)

Charles James Liteky (February 14, 1931 – January 20, 2017), formerly known as Angelo Liteky, was an American peace activist who served as a United States Army chaplain in the Vietnam War and was awarded the U.S. military's highest decoration, the Medal of Honor. A Roman Catholic priest, Liteky received the award for braving intense fire to carry 20 wounded soldiers to safety during a 1967 battle. He later left the priesthood, became a social activist, and in 1986 renounced his Medal of Honor.

== Military service ==
Born on February 14, 1931, in Washington, D.C., Liteky joined the Army from Fort Hamilton, New York. He served in South Vietnam as a captain and chaplain in Headquarters and Headquarters Company of the 199th Light Infantry Brigade. On December 6, 1967, near Phuoc Lac in South Vietnam's Biên Hòa Province, he was accompanying Company A, 4th Battalion, 12th Infantry Regiment, 199th Light Infantry Brigade, on a search and destroy mission when they came under heavy fire from a numerically superior enemy force. Seeing two wounded men lying 15 metres (49 ft) from an enemy machine gun, Liteky shielded them with his body and, once the volume of fire had sufficiently decreased, dragged them to the relative safety of a helicopter landing zone. Although wounded in the neck and foot, he continued to expose himself to hostile fire in order to rescue more of the wounded and administer last rites to the dying. When the landing zone came under fire, he stood in the open and directed the medical evacuation helicopters in and out of the area. After the wounded had been evacuated, he returned to the perimeter to encourage the remaining soldiers until Company A was relieved the next morning. Liteky carried a total of 20 soldiers to safety during the battle. For these actions, he was awarded the Medal of Honor.

== Activism ==
Liteky left the priesthood in 1975. In 1983, he married a former nun named Judy Balch (1942–2016), who encouraged his involvement in social justice activities, particularly protesting the School of the Americas (now the Western Hemisphere Institute for Security Cooperation) at Fort Benning, Georgia. On July 29, 1986, he renounced his Medal of Honor by placing it in an envelope addressed to then-President Ronald Reagan near the Vietnam Veterans Memorial on the National Mall in Washington, D.C. The decoration is on display at the National Museum of American History. In doing this, he became the first and (as of 2026) only recipient to have renounced the Medal. He wanted to renounce his Medal of Honor before embarking, in September 1986, on the Veterans Fast for Life in protest against the U.S. policies in Central America. He also opposed the United States' invasion of Iraq. He died on January 20, 2017, at the age of 85.

== Medal of Honor citation ==
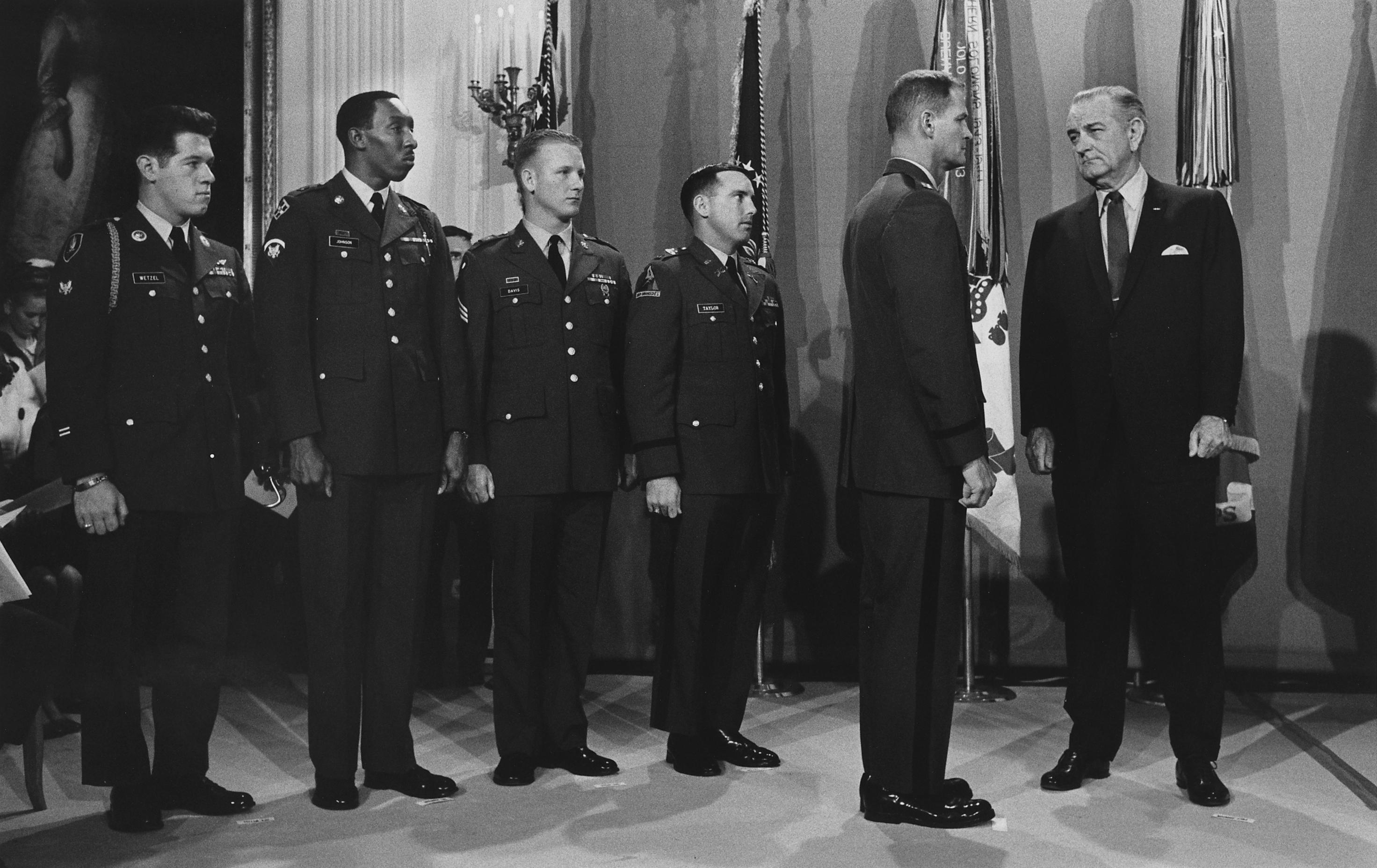
Liteky (second from right) receiving the Medal of Honor from President Lyndon B. Johnson on November 19, 1968, along with four fellow recipients: Gary Wetzel, Dwight H. Johnson, Sammy L. Davis, and James Allen Taylor.

Liteky's official Medal of Honor citation reads:

Chaplain Liteky distinguished himself by exceptional heroism while serving with Company A, 4th Battalion, 12th Infantry, 199th Light Infantry Brigade. He was participating in a search and destroy operation when Company A came under intense fire from a battalion size enemy force. Momentarily stunned from the immediate encounter that ensued, the men hugged the ground for cover. Observing 2 wounded men, Chaplain Liteky moved to within 15 meters of an enemy machine gun position to reach them, placing himself between the enemy and the wounded men. When there was a brief respite in the fighting, he managed to drag them to the relative safety of the landing zone. Inspired by his courageous actions, the company rallied and began placing a heavy volume of fire upon the enemy's positions. In a magnificent display of courage and leadership, Chaplain Liteky began moving upright through the enemy fire, administering last rites to the dying and evacuating the wounded. Noticing another trapped and seriously wounded man, Chaplain Liteky crawled to his aid. Realizing that the wounded man was too heavy to carry, he rolled on his back, placed the man on his chest and through sheer determination and fortitude crawled back to the landing zone using his elbows and heels to push himself along. Pausing for breath momentarily, he returned to the action and came upon a man entangled in the dense, thorny underbrush. Once more intense enemy fire was directed at him, but Chaplain Liteky stood his ground and calmly broke the vines and carried the man to the landing zone for evacuation. On several occasions when the landing zone was under small arms and rocket fire, Chaplain Liteky stood up in the face of hostile fire and personally directed the medivac helicopters into and out of the area. With the wounded safely evacuated, Chaplain Liteky returned to the perimeter, constantly encouraging and inspiring the men. Upon the unit's relief on the morning of 7 December 1967, it was discovered that despite painful wounds in the neck and foot, Chaplain Liteky had personally carried over 20 men to the landing zone for evacuation during the savage fighting. Through his indomitable inspiration and heroic actions, Chaplain Liteky saved the lives of a number of his comrades and enabled the company to repulse the enemy. Chaplain Liteky's actions reflect great credit upon himself and were in keeping with the highest traditions of the U.S. Army.

== See also ==
- List of Chaplain Corps Medal of Honor recipients
- List of Medal of Honor recipients for the Vietnam War
- Roy Bourgeois, activist Catholic priest who also served in Vietnam
- Brian Willson, antiwar activist, former U.S. Air Force officer who served in Vietnam
- Thomas C. Neibaur, World War I veteran who returned his Medal of Honor in protest
- Veterans Fast for Life
