= KIDJ =

Coordinates: 43.543°N 111.886°W

- Sugar City, Idaho; United States
- Broadcast area: Idaho Falls, Idaho
- Frequency: 106.3 MHz
- Branding: KID Newsradio

Programming
- Format: News/talk
- Affiliations: Fox News Radio; Compass Media Networks; Premiere Networks

Ownership
- Owner: Rich Broadcasting; (Rich Broadcasting Idaho LS, LLC)

History
- First air date: 1986 (as KKQT)
- Former call signs: KKQT (1981–1989); KRXK-FM (1989–1994); KGTM (1994–2015); KQEZ (2015–2016)
- Call sign meaning: Programming formerly originated on KID

Technical information
- Licensing authority: FCC
- Facility ID: 12665
- Class: C1
- ERP: 100,000 watts
- HAAT: 194 meters (636 ft)

Links
- Public license information: Public file; LMS
- Webcast: Listen live
- Website: www.kidnewsradio.com

KIDJ (106.3 FM) is a commercial radio station located in Sugar City, Idaho, broadcasting to the Idaho Falls area. KIDJ airs a news/talk format, formerly originated from KID (590 AM).
