= KIDG =

News/talk radio station in Pocatello, Idaho

Coordinates: 42.8738°N 112.5139°W

Simulcast with KIDJ, Sugar City
- Pocatello, Idaho; United States
- Broadcast area: Pocatello, Idaho
- Frequency: 92.1 MHz
- Branding: News Radio KID

Programming
- Format: News/talk
- Affiliations: Fox News Radio; Compass Media Networks; Premiere Networks

Ownership
- Owner: Rich Broadcasting; (Rich Broadcasting Idaho LS, LLC)

History
- First air date: July 25, 2007 (as KPPC)
- Former call signs: KPPC (2003–2008); KEGE (2008–2015)
- Call sign meaning: Derived from KID

Technical information
- Licensing authority: FCC
- Facility ID: 87656
- Class: C2
- ERP: 12,000 watts
- HAAT: 301 meters (988 ft)

Links
- Public license information: Public file; LMS
- Webcast: Listen live
- Website: www.kidnewsradio.com

KIDG (92.1 FM) is a commercial radio station located in Pocatello, Idaho. KIDG airs a news/talk format, simulcast with KIDJ (106.3 FM) in Sugar City and formerly originated on KID (590 AM) in Idaho Falls. The call letters were changed from KPPC to KEGE on March 7, 2008, to match the station's previous "Edge" branding and then changed to KIDG on December 7, 2015.
