= Harold G. Hillam =

American religious leader

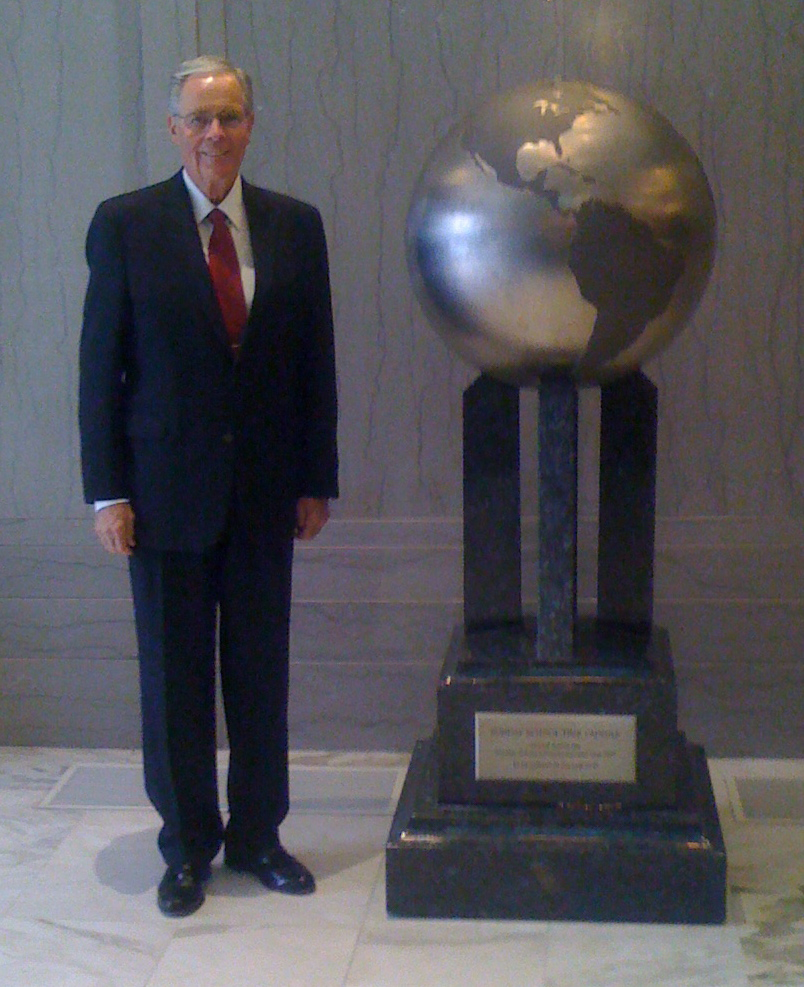

Second Quorum of the Seventy
- March 31, 1990 – April 6, 1991
- Called by: Ezra Taft Benson
- End reason: Transferred to the First Quorum of the Seventy

First Quorum of the Seventy
- April 6, 1991 – October 1, 2005
- Called by: Ezra Taft Benson
- End reason: Designated an emeritus general authority

Presidency of the Seventy
- August 15, 1995 – August 15, 2000
- Called by: Gordon B. Hinckley
- End reason: Honorably released

Emeritus General Authority
- October 1, 2005 – March 27, 2012
- Called by: Gordon B. Hinckley

Personal details
- Born: Harold Gordon Hillam; September 1, 1934; Sugar City, Idaho, United States
- Died: March 27, 2012 (aged 77); Salt Lake City, Utah, United States

Harold Gordon Hillam (September 1, 1934 – March 27, 2012) was a general authority of the Church of Jesus Christ of Latter-day Saints (LDS Church) from 1990 until his death. Hillam was the fifteenth general president of the LDS Church's Sunday School organization from 1995 to 2000 and was president of the Boise Idaho Temple from 2005 to 2008.

Hillam was born in Sugar City, Idaho. As a young man, he was an LDS Church missionary in Brazil. Hillam received a bachelor's degree from Brigham Young University. Hillam was later trained as a dentist and an orthodontist at Northwestern University. He practiced orthodontics in Idaho Falls, Idaho.

In 1981, Hillam was called as president of the LDS Church's Portugal Lisbon Mission. In 1990, he became a member of the Second Quorum of the Seventy, and a year later was transferred to the First Quorum of the Seventy. Hillam became a member of the seven-man Presidency of the Seventy in 1995; while in this position, Hillam was general president of the Sunday School organization. On December 8, 1999, the eve of the 150th commemoration of the founding of the Sunday School, Hillam sealed the third Sunday School time capsule in the Joseph Smith Memorial Building; the capsule is scheduled to be opened in 2049, at the organization's 200th anniversary.

Hillam was released from the Presidency of the Seventy and as general Sunday School president in 2000, but continued as a member of the First Quorum of the Seventy until 2005, when he was designated an emeritus general authority and became president of the Boise Idaho Temple, where he served until 2008.

Hillam was married to Carol Rasmussen and they had seven children, including Bonnie H. Cordon, who served as the fifteenth general president of the Young Women organization for the LDS Church. He died at his home in Salt Lake City, Utah at age 77.

== Publications and sermons ==
- "What Matters Most", New Era, Apr 2001
- "Not for the Body", Ensign, Oct. 2001
- "Strength in Adversity", BYU Speeches, 1996-06-26
- “Sunday School: Oil for Our Lamps”, Ensign, Aug. 1999, 15
- "Friend to Friend", Friend, May 1992

=== General Conference sermons ===
- "The Worth of Souls", April 2005
- "Future Leaders", April 2000
- "Teachers, the Timeless Key", October 1997
- "Sacrifice in the Service", October 1995
- "No More Strangers and Foreigners", October 1990
- "An Example of What Welfare Services Can Do", April 1980
