= John Baca =

United States Army soldier (born 1949)

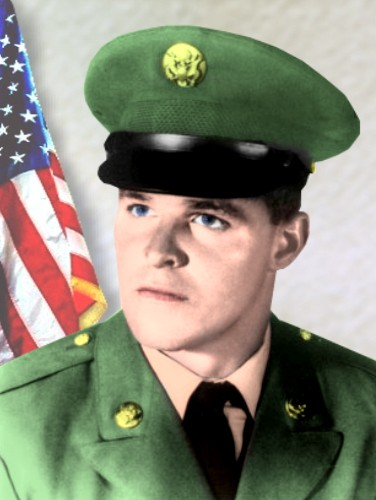
- John P. Baca
- Born: January 10, 1949 (age 77); Providence, Rhode Island, U.S.
- Military career
- Allegiance: United States
- Branch: United States Army
- Service years: 1968–1970
- Rank: Specialist Four
- Units: 12th Cavalry Regiment, 1st Cavalry Division
- Conflicts: Vietnam War
- Awards: Medal of Honor; Silver Star; Bronze Star Medal; Purple Heart; Air Medal

John Philip Baca (born January 10, 1949) is a former United States Army soldier and a Vietnam War veteran. He was awarded the Medal of Honor, the highest decoration of the United States Armed Forces, for his actions in Vietnam.

== Early life ==
Baca was born on January 10, 1949, in Providence, Rhode Island, and was raised in San Diego, California. Baca was drafted into the United States Army on June 10, 1968.

== Vietnam War ==
By February 10, 1970, Baca was stationed in South Vietnam as a specialist four with Company D of the 1st Battalion, 12th Cavalry Regiment, 1st Cavalry Division. On that day, in Phước Long Province during Operation Toan Thang IV, he was serving on a recoilless rifle team when the lead platoon of his company was ambushed. Baca led his team forward through intense fire to reach the besieged platoon. When a fragmentation grenade was tossed into their midst, he "unhesitatingly, and with complete disregard for his own safety," covered it with his helmet and then laid his body over the helmet, smothering the blast and saving eight fellow soldiers from severe injury or death.

Baca survived his wounds and was formally awarded the Medal of Honor by President Richard M. Nixon on March 2, 1971. Two other soldiers in Company D, Allen J. Lynch and Rodney J. Evans, had previously earned the medal.

In 1990, Baca returned to Vietnam with seven other soldiers of the Veterans Vietnam Restoration Project. The group spent eight weeks working alongside former North Vietnamese Army soldiers building a health clinic in a village north of Hanoi.

Baca rarely speaks publicly about the events for which he was awarded the Medal of Honor. However, he prefers to recall an event that occurred on Christmas Day, 1969, when he was walking ahead of his unit, acting as "point," and surprised a young North Vietnamese soldier sitting alone on top of an enemy bunker in the jungle. He saw that the soldier could not reach his rifle quickly and, not wanting to shoot him, yelled in Vietnamese for him to surrender. Not only was he able to take his "Christmas gift" alive and unharmed, the young man, twenty years later, was among the Vietnamese that Baca worked with building the clinic in 1990.

== Post-war life ==
Baca remains active in social causes, particularly related to Vietnam veterans' issues and the plight of the homeless.

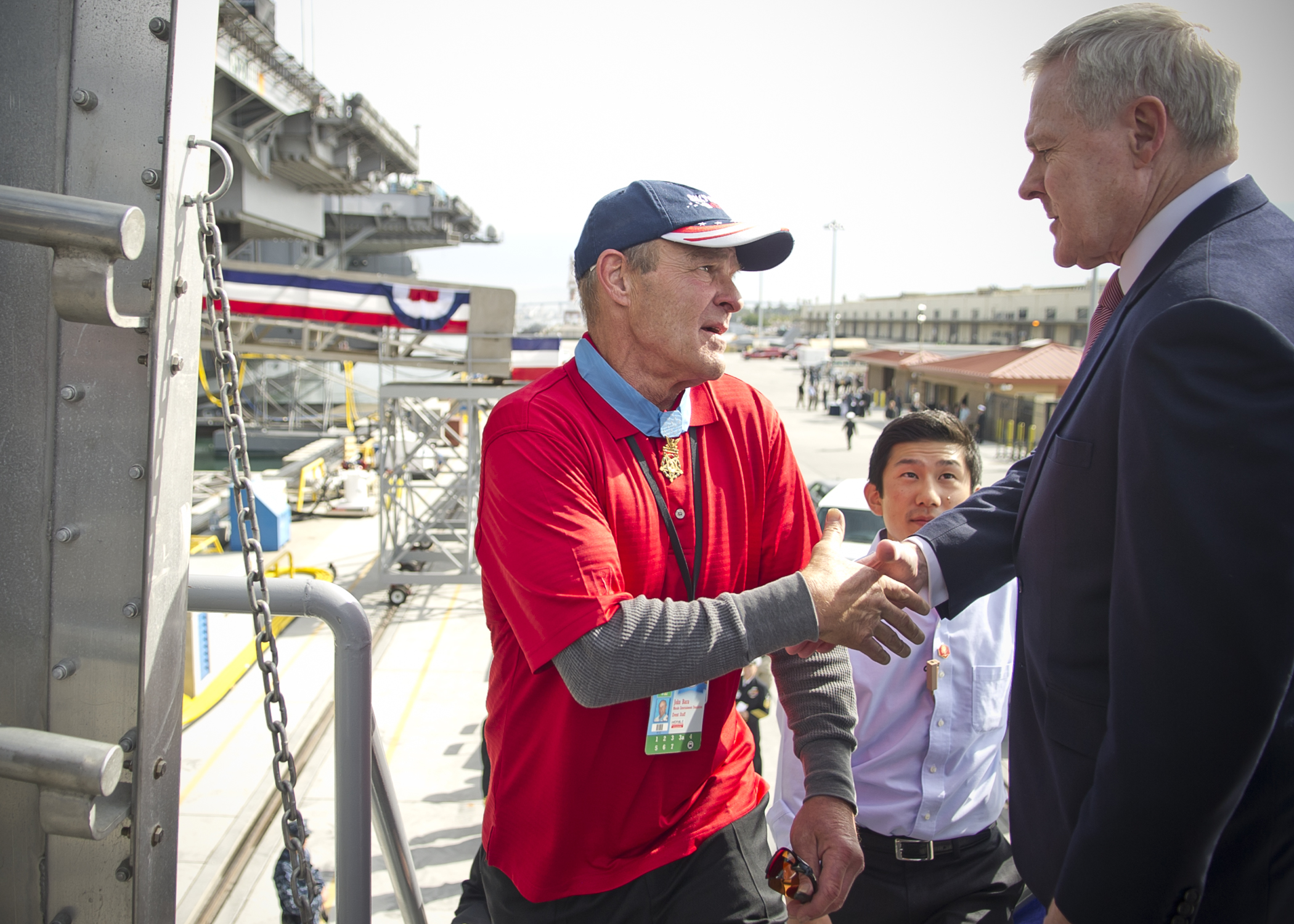
Ray Mabus greeting Baca in 2011

In 2002, a park was named in his honor in Huntington Beach, California. At the park's dedication on April 27, he read the following poem he penned for the occasion:

It's a playground for the young, a walk for the dog,
These grounds will be blessed by the rain and the sun, free from the smog.
A refuge for the birds vacationing south, "Let's visit Baca's Park."
Soon it won't be long for all to enjoy their song! My buddies and friends have joined me for this delight.
Some unknown evenings I may be sitting upon my bench enjoying the quiet of the night.
What is a park? A site of beauty, a place to rest.
A place to stay, leave one's worries, also leave behind their stress of the day.
A solitude visitor can be still, enjoy the quiet of their thought.
One can hear the voices in the breeze, trees are clapping their hands, with the movement of the leaves.
All humanity can find a space. All are welcomed to a safe, you might say sacred place.
These grounds will be a witness for families, lovers and friends who picnic, play, hold hands and maybe embrace.
It will be filled with harmony and song and the smile of God's grace.
One last thing before I depart and be on my way,
I sat on the bench and a swing in the park that was dedicated in my honor and in my name on this beautiful day.

After living in Huntington Beach, Baca moved to Julian, California, enjoying the relative solitude.

== Medal of Honor citation ==

Medal of Honor citation reads:

For conspicuous gallantry and intrepidity in action at the risk of his life above and beyond the call of duty. Sp4c. Baca, Company D, distinguished himself while serving on a recoilless rifle team during a night ambush mission. A platoon from his company was sent to investigate the detonation of an automatic ambush device forward of his unit's main position and soon came under intense enemy fire from concealed positions along the trail. Hearing the heavy firing from the platoon position and realizing that his recoilless rifle team could assist the members of the besieged patrol, Sp4c. Baca led his team through the hail of enemy fire to a firing position within the patrol's defensive perimeter. As they prepared to engage the enemy, a fragmentation grenade was thrown into the midst of the patrol. Fully aware of the danger to his comrades, Sp4c. Baca unhesitatingly, and with complete disregard for his own safety, covered the grenade with his steel helmet and fell on it as the grenade exploded, thereby absorbing the lethal fragments and concussion with his body. His gallant action and total disregard for his personal well-being directly saved 8 men from certain serious injury or death. The extraordinary courage and selflessness displayed by Sp4c. Baca, at the risk of his life, are in the highest traditions of the military service and reflect great credit on him, his unit, and the U.S. Army.

== Decorations ==

Badge	Combat Infantryman Badge		
1st row	Medal of Honor	Silver Star	Bronze Star Medal
2nd row	Purple Heart	Air Medal	Army Good Conduct Medal
3rd row	National Defense Service Medal	Vietnam Service Medal with 2 Campaign stars	Vietnam Campaign Medal
Unit awards	RVN Gallantry Cross Unit Citation With Palm		RVN Civil Action Unit Citation 1st Class

1st Cavalry Division Insignia

== See also ==
- List of Medal of Honor recipients for the Vietnam War
- List of Hispanic Medal of Honor recipients
