= James Allen Taylor =

United States Army Medal of Honor recipient

- Born: December 31, 1937 (age 88); Arcata, California, US
- Military career
- Allegiance: United States
- Branch: United States Army
- Service years: 1956–1980
- Rank: Major
- Units: 1st Squadron, 1st Cavalry Regiment
- Conflicts: Vietnam War
- Awards: Medal of Honor; Bronze Star Medal; Purple Heart; Air Medal

James Allen Taylor (born December 31, 1937) is a retired United States Army officer and a recipient of the United States military's highest decoration—the Medal of Honor—for his actions in the Vietnam War.

== Military career ==
Taylor joined the United States Army from San Francisco, California, in 1956 and was commissioned as an officer in 1965. By November 8, 1967, he was serving as a first lieutenant in Troop B, 1st Squadron, 1st Cavalry Regiment, Americal Division. When his commander was wounded in action, Taylor was ordered into the combat zone to take command and prepare a search-and-destroy mission. During a battle the next day, west of Que Son in the Republic of Vietnam, Taylor repeatedly exposed himself to enemy fire to rescue crewmen from damaged assault vehicles and personnel carriers. He was subsequently promoted to captain and awarded the Medal of Honor on November 19, 1968.

Taylor reached the rank of major before retiring from the army in 1980. He holds a bachelor's degree in criminology from the University of Tampa.

In October 2024, Taylor joined 15 other Medal of Honor recipients in publicly endorsing Donald Trump for president.

== Medal of Honor citation ==
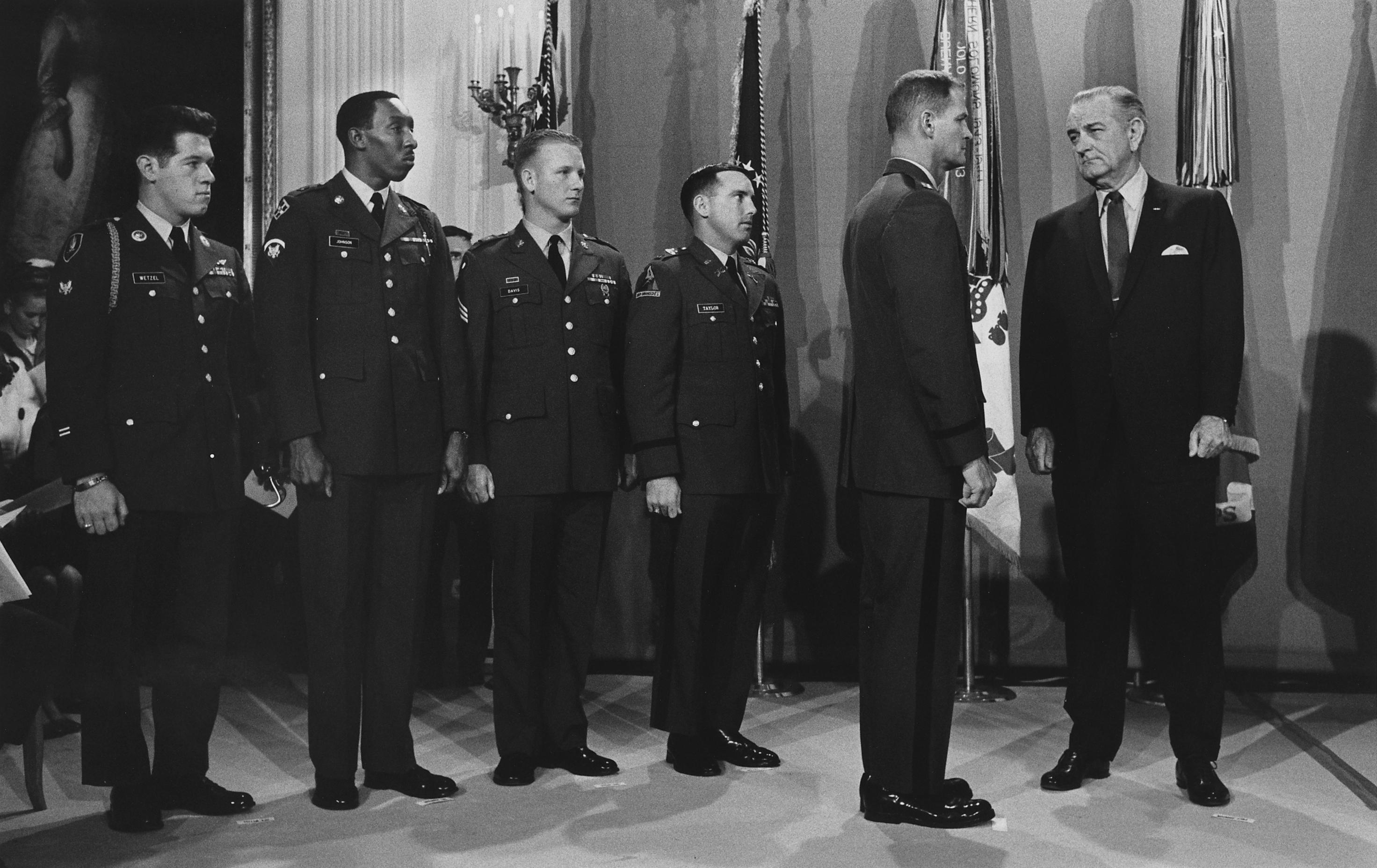
Taylor (fourth from left) receiving the Medal of Honor from President Lyndon B. Johnson along with four fellow recipients: Gary Wetzel, Dwight H. Johnson, Sammy L. Davis, and Charles Liteky.

Taylor's official Medal of Honor citation reads:

Capt. Taylor, Armor, was serving as executive officer of Troop B, 1st Squadron. His troop was engaged in an attack on a fortified position west of Que Son when it came under intense enemy recoilless rifle, mortar, and automatic weapons fire from an enemy strong point located immediately to its front. One armored cavalry assault vehicle was hit immediately by recoilless rifle fire and all 5 crewmembers were wounded. Aware that the stricken vehicle was in grave danger of exploding, Capt. Taylor rushed forward and personally extracted the wounded to safety despite the hail of enemy fire and exploding ammunition. Within minutes a second armored cavalry assault vehicle was hit by multiple recoilless rifle rounds. Despite the continuing intense enemy fire, Capt. Taylor moved forward on foot to rescue the wounded men from the burning vehicle and personally removed all the crewmen to the safety of a nearby dike. Moments later the vehicle exploded. As he was returning to his vehicle, a bursting mortar round painfully wounded Capt. Taylor, yet he valiantly returned to his vehicle to relocate the medical evacuation landing zone to an area closer to the front lines. As he was moving his vehicle, it came under machinegun fire from an enemy position not 50 yards away. Capt. Taylor engaged the position with his machinegun, killing the 3-man crew. Upon arrival at the new evacuation site, still another vehicle was struck. Once again Capt. Taylor rushed forward and pulled the wounded from the vehicle, loaded them aboard his vehicle, and returned them safely to the evacuation site. His actions of unsurpassed valor were a source of inspiration to his entire troop, contributed significantly to the success of the overall assault on the enemy position, and were directly responsible for saving the lives of a number of his fellow soldiers. His actions were in keeping with the highest traditions of the military profession and reflect great credit upon himself, his unit, and the U.S. Army.

== See also ==
- List of Medal of Honor recipients for the Vietnam War
