= Sammy L. Davis =

American soldier

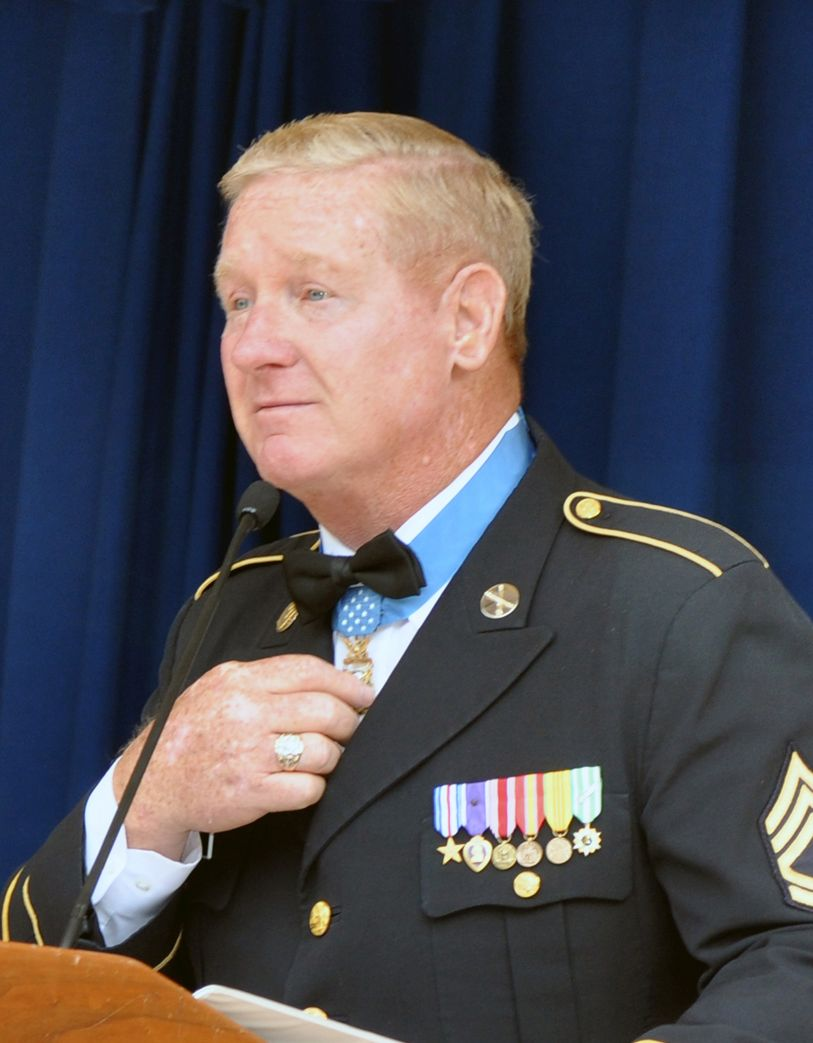
- Sammy Davis in July 2009
- Born: November 1, 1946 (age 79); Dayton, Ohio, United States
- Spouse(s): Dixie Marie Taylor Peggy Jo Martin (m. 1968; died 2004)
- Military career
- Allegiance: United States
- Branch: United States Army
- Service years: 1965–1984
- Rank: Sergeant First Class
- Nickname: The Real Forrest Gump
- Units: Battery C, 2nd Battalion, 4th Artillery Regiment
- Conflicts: Vietnam War
- Awards: Medal of Honor; Silver Star; Purple Heart (2); Sachem Award

Sammy Lee Davis (born November 1, 1946) is an American soldier who served in the United States Army during the Vietnam War and was awarded the nation's highest military medal for valor, the Medal of Honor.

== Early years ==
Born in Dayton, Ohio, on November 1, 1946, Davis was raised in French Camp, California. His family had a long tradition of military service; his grandfather served in the Spanish–American War, his father Robert Davis was in World War II, and his brothers Hubert ("Buddy") and Darrell Davis served in Korea and Vietnam, respectively. Davis attended Manteca High School in Manteca, California, where he was a member of the football and diving teams. He also participated in Sea Scouting in Stockton. After his junior year of high school, Davis' family moved to Indiana. He graduated from Mooresville High School in 1966.

== Military career ==
Davis enlisted in the United States Army from Indianapolis, Indiana, in 1965.

In March 1967, Davis was sent to South Vietnam as a private first class, and was assigned to Battery C, 2nd Battalion, 4th Artillery Regiment, 9th Infantry Division. On November 18, 1967, his unit at Firebase Cudgel (10.4198°N 105.991°E) west of Cai Lay, fell under machine gun fire and heavy mortar attack by an estimated three companies of Viet Cong from the 261st Viet Cong Main Force Battalion, which swarmed the area from the south and then west. Upon detecting an enemy position, Davis manned a machine gun to give his comrades covering fire so they could fire artillery in response. Davis was wounded, but ignored warnings to take cover, taking over the unit's burning howitzer and firing several shells himself. He also disregarded his inability to swim due to a broken back, and crossed a river there on an air mattress to help rescue three wounded American soldiers. He ultimately found his way to another howitzer site to continue fighting the NVA attack until they fled. The battle lasted two hours.

Davis was subsequently promoted to sergeant and received the Medal of Honor the following year from President Lyndon B. Johnson. After he was presented the medal at the White House ceremony, Davis played "Oh Shenandoah" on his harmonica in memory of the men he served with in Vietnam.

Davis retired in 1984 due to his wartime injuries.

== Later years ==
In 1994, footage of his Medal of Honor award ceremony was used in the film Forrest Gump, with actor Tom Hanks's head superimposed over that of Davis.

Davis tells his story in the 2002 documentary A Time For Honor.

In July 2005, while in Indianapolis, Davis' medal was stolen out of the trunk of his car. It was recovered a few days later in the neighboring White River.

On July 4, 2010, Davis helped celebrate the 100th birthday of the Boy Scouts of America at Arlington Park. Davis entered scouting at the age of 9. He has also been honored by the Joe Foss Institute for his dedication to serving America.

Davis is a member of the Church of Jesus Christ of Latter-day Saints.

In October 2024, Davis joined 15 other Medal of Honor recipients in publicly endorsing Donald Trump for president.

== Military awards ==
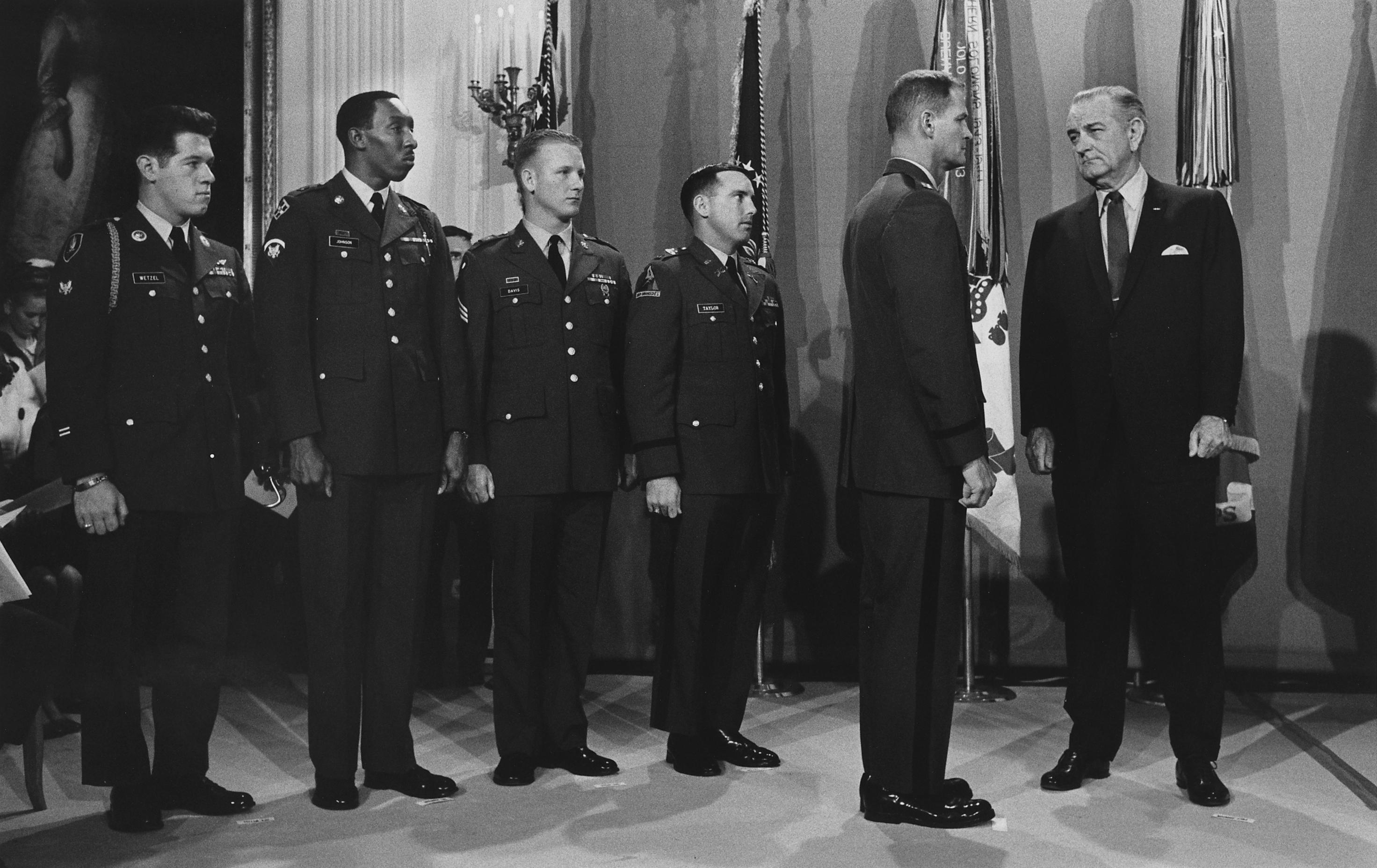
Davis (third from left) receiving the Medal of Honor from President Lyndon B. Johnson on November 19, 1968, along with four fellow recipients: Gary Wetzel, Dwight H. Johnson, James Allen Taylor, and Angelo Liteky.

Davis's military decorations and awards include:

1st row	Medal of Honor		
2nd row	Silver Star	Purple Heart with 1 bronze Oak Leaf Cluster (2 awards)	Good Conduct Medal
3rd row	National Defense Service Medal	Vietnam Service Medal with 2 Campaign stars	Republic of Vietnam Campaign Medal with "60–" clasp
Unit Citations	Presidential Unit Citation		Republic of Vietnam Gallantry Cross Unit Citation with palm and frame

=== Medal of Honor ===
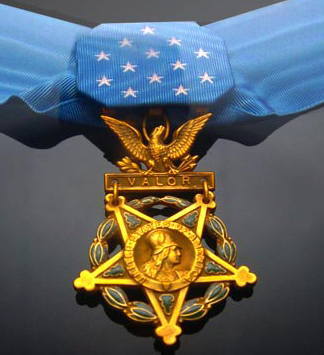

Sammy Lee Davis
Rank and organization: Sergeant (then Private First Class), U.S. Army, Battery C, 2nd Battalion, 4th Artillery, 9th Infantry Division
Place and date: West of Cai Lay, Republic of Vietnam, 18 November 1967
Entered service at: Indianapolis, Indiana
Born: 1 November 1946, Dayton, Ohio

Citation:

For conspicuous gallantry and intrepidity in action at the risk of his life and beyond the call of duty. SGT Davis (then PFC) distinguished himself during the early morning hours while serving as a cannoneer with Battery C at a remote fire support base. At approximately 0200 hours, the fire support base was under heavy enemy mortar attack. Simultaneously, an estimated reinforced Viet Cong battalion launched a fierce ground assault upon the fire support base. The attacking enemy drove to within 25 meters of the friendly positions. Only a river separated the Viet Cong from the fire support base. They were detecting a nearby enemy position, Sgt. Davis seized a machine gun and provided covering fire for his gun crew as they attempted to bring direct artillery fire on the enemy. Despite his efforts, an enemy recoilless rifle round scored a direct hit upon the artillery piece. The resultant blast hurled the gun crew from their weapon and blew Sgt. Davis into a foxhole. He struggled to his feet and returned to the howitzer, burning furiously. Ignoring repeated warnings to seek cover, SGT Davis rammed a shell into the gun. Disregarding a withering hail of enemy fire directed against his position, he aimed and fired the howitzer, which rolled backward, knocking SGT Davis violently to the ground. Undaunted, he returned to the weapon to fire again when an enemy mortar round exploded within 20 meters of his position, injuring him painfully. Nevertheless, SGT Davis loaded the artillery piece, aimed, and fired. Again he was knocked down by the recoil. In complete disregard for his safety, SGT Davis loaded and fired three more shells into the enemy. Disregarding his extensive injuries and inability to swim, SGT Davis picked up an air mattress and struck out across the deep river to rescue three wounded comrades on the far side. Upon reaching the three wounded men, he stood upright and fired into the dense vegetation to prevent the Viet Cong from advancing. While the most seriously wounded soldier was helped across the river, SGT Davis protected the two remaining casualties until he could pull them across the river to the fire support base. Though suffering from painful wounds, he refused medical attention, joining another howitzer crew that fired at the large Viet Cong force until it broke contact and fled. SGT Davis' extraordinary heroism, at the risk of his life, is in keeping with the highest traditions of military service and reflects great credit upon himself and the U.S. Army.

/S/ Lyndon B. Johnson

== Bibliography ==
- Davis, Dixie (2016). Endless Love and Second Chances: The wife of Medal of Honor recipient Sammy Davis shares their love story through grief, faith, and joyful new beginnings. Freedom, IN: Dixie Davis. ISBN 978-0692589755.
- Davis, Sammy L. and Caroline Lambert (2016). You Don't Lose 'Til You Quit Trying: Lessons on Adversity and Victory from a Vietnam Veteran and Medal of Honor Recipient. New York, NY: Berkley Books. ISBN 978-0425283035 OCLC 918284690

== See also ==
- List of Medal of Honor recipients for the Vietnam War
