= Ronald E. Ray =

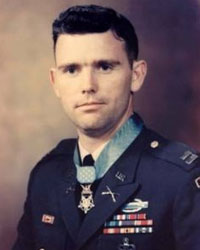
- Ronald E. Ray
- Born: December 7, 1941 (age 84); Cordele, Georgia
- Military career
- Allegiance: United States
- Branch: United States Army
- Service years: 1959–1980
- Rank: Lieutenant Colonel
- Unit: 35th Infantry Regiment
- Conflicts: Vietnam War
- Awards: Medal of Honor; Silver Star; Bronze Star Medal; Purple Heart
- Other work: Assistant Secretary, Department of Veterans Affairs

Ronald Eric Ray (born December 7, 1941) is a former United States Army officer and a recipient of the United States military's highest decoration, the Medal of Honor, for his actions in the Vietnam War.

== Early life and career ==
Born in Cordele, Georgia, on December 7, 1941, Ray was one of five brothers. He left high school in 1959 and joined the United States Army from Atlanta for a three-year term of service. Only two months after finishing his enlistment, he rejoined the Special Forces. Ray excelled in his training, such as that for HALO jumping, and was selected for Officer Candidate School. Upon graduation he became a commissioned officer.

== Vietnam War ==
Sent to South Vietnam in early June 1966 as a first lieutenant, Ray led a platoon in Company A of the 2nd Battalion, 35th Infantry Regiment, 25th Infantry Division. Shortly after Ray's arrival in the country, his company took part in an operation in the Ia Drang Valley to cut off Vietcong (VC) forces entering South Vietnam from Cambodia. Ray set up a command post on a small hill, then established listening posts throughout the large area his platoon was tasked with covering. On June 19, one of these listening posts came under intense fire from a company-sized VC force and was cut off from the rest of the platoon. After learning that no reinforcements were available from his company commander, Ray gathered the rest of his platoon and set off through one mile (1.6 km) of dense jungle to rescue the ten men in the besieged post. With his soldiers firing in "small, frequent bursts" to make themselves appear like a larger force, the unit was able to break through and join the trapped men.

Ray directed his soldiers in the defense of their post as the VC force regrouped and resumed the attack. When a squad sent out to destroy a hostile machine gun nest became pinned down, Ray stormed the emplacement himself, killing the four gunners with his grenades and shotgun. He then rescued a medic and a wounded man who had come under intense fire by silencing the hostile position with a grenade. As a VC grenade landed near two of his soldiers, Ray shielded them with his body, suffering shrapnel wounds to his legs and feet. Immediately after, he was shot in the legs by a machine gun, which he then destroyed with his last grenade. Although his lower body was momentarily paralyzed by his injuries, Ray continued to lead the platoon until a lull in the fighting allowed them to withdraw. He intended to stay behind and provide covering fire, but his sergeant carried him to the extraction point after the rest of the unit had escaped.

Ray was evacuated to Pleiku and then Fort Bragg, North Carolina, where he received medical treatment for the next six months. He was promoted to captain and by 1970 was stationed at Fort Benning, Georgia. On May 14, 1970, President Richard Nixon formally presented Ray with the Medal of Honor for his actions in the Ia Drang Valley. Ray retired from the Army for medical reasons in 1980 as a lieutenant colonel, having served a total of three tours in Vietnam.

== Civilian life ==
While still in the Army, Ray graduated from the University of Tampa and received a master's degree in public administration from the University of Oklahoma. After leaving the military, he settled in Florida and established a career as a real estate broker. He founded Ronald E. Ray, Inc., a real estate development and brokerage company.

Through the White House Fellows program, Ray served as a special assistant to the United States Secretary of Commerce from 1974 to 1975. He supported the Republican Party, and worked on the successful presidential campaigns of Ronald Reagan and George H. W. Bush in 1984 and 1988, respectively. In 1989, President Bush appointed him as an assistant secretary for the Department of Veterans Affairs, a position Ray would hold until 1993.

Ray is a former president of the Congressional Medal of Honor Society.

== Medal of Honor citation ==
Ray's official Medal of Honor citation reads:

For conspicuous gallantry and intrepidity in action at the risk of his life above and beyond the call of duty. Capt. Ray distinguished himself while serving as a platoon leader with Company A. When 1 of his ambush patrols was attacked by an estimated reinforced Viet Cong company, Capt. Ray organized a reaction force and quickly moved through 2 kilometers of mountainous jungle terrain to the contact area. After breaking through the hostile lines to reach the beleaguered patrol, Capt. Ray began directing the reinforcement of the site. When an enemy position pinned down 3 of his men with a heavy volume of automatic weapons fire, he silenced the emplacement with a grenade and killed 4 Viet Cong with his rifle fire. As medics were moving a casualty toward a sheltered position, they began receiving intense hostile fire. While directing suppressive fire on the enemy position, Capt. Ray moved close enough to silence the enemy with a grenade. A few moments later Capt. Ray saw an enemy grenade land, unnoticed, near 2 of his men. Without hesitation or regard for his safety he dove between the grenade and the men, thus shielding them from the explosion while receiving wounds in his exposed feet and legs. He immediately sustained additional wounds in his legs from an enemy machinegun, but nevertheless he silenced the emplacement with another grenade. Although suffering great pain from his wounds, Capt. Ray continued to direct his men, providing the outstanding courage and leadership they vitally needed, and prevented their annihilation by successfully leading them from their surrounded position. Only after assuring that his platoon was no longer in immediate danger did he allow himself to be evacuated for medical treatment. By his gallantry at the risk of his life in the highest traditions of the military service, Capt. Ray has reflected great credit on himself, his unit, and the U.S. Army.

== See also ==
- List of Medal of Honor recipients for the Vietnam War
