= Gary Wetzel =

United States Army Medal of Honor recipient

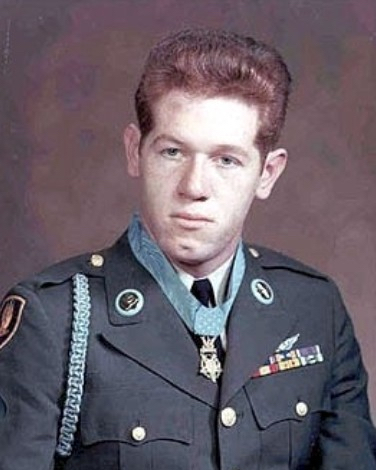
- Wetzel in 1968
- Born: September 29, 1947 (age 79); South Milwaukee, Wisconsin
- Military career
- Allegiance: United States
- Branch: United States Army
- Service years: 1965–1968
- Rank: Specialist Four
- Units: 173rd Assault Helicopter Company, 11th Combat Aviation Battalion
- Conflicts: Vietnam War
- Awards: Medal of Honor; Purple Heart; Air Medal

Gary George Wetzel (born September 29, 1947) is a former United States Army soldier and a recipient of the United States military's highest decoration, the Medal of Honor, for his actions in the Vietnam War.

== Military career ==
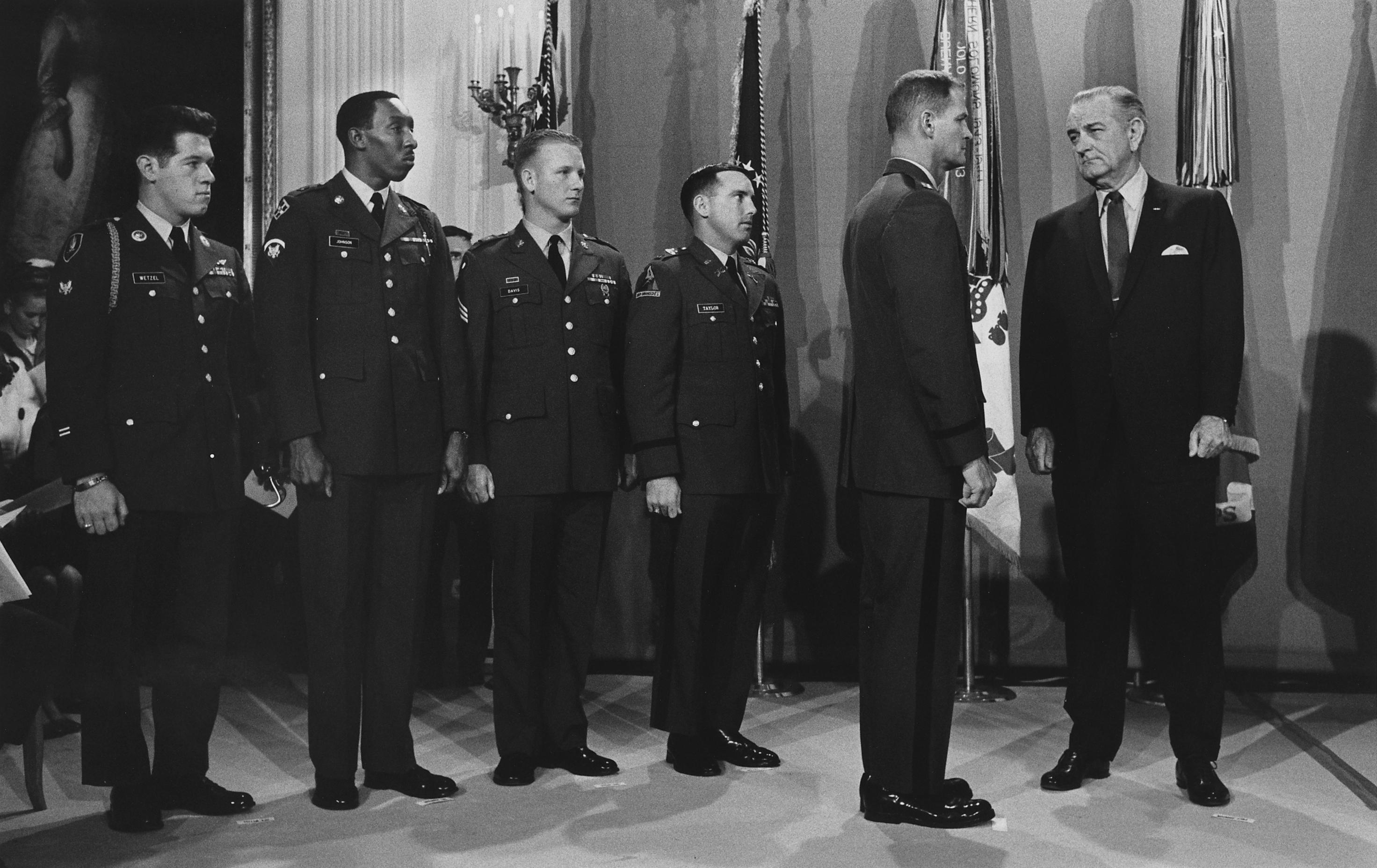
Wetzel (pictured on the left) receiving the Medal of Honor from President Lyndon B. Johnson on November 19, 1968, along with four fellow recipients: Sammy L. Davis, Dwight H. Johnson, James Allen Taylor, and Angelo Liteky.

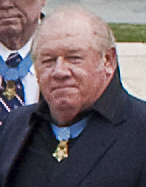
Wetzel in 2009

Wetzel joined the United States Army from Milwaukee, Wisconsin, at age 18 in 1965. By January 8, 1968, he was a private first class serving as a door gunner in the 173rd Assault Helicopter Company. On that day, near Ap Dong An, Republic of Vietnam, his helicopter was shot down and the survivors, including Wetzel, came under heavy enemy fire. Severely wounded by an explosion that nearly severed his left arm, he continued to man his machine gun and help other injured soldiers. Wetzel survived his wounds, although his left arm had to be amputated. He was subsequently promoted to specialist four and awarded the Medal of Honor for his actions.

== Personal life ==
As of 2009, Wetzel lives in his hometown of South Milwaukee, Wisconsin, and works as a heavy equipment operator.

== Medal of Honor citation ==
Wetzel's official Medal of Honor citation reads:

Sp4c. Wetzel, 173d Assault Helicopter Company, distinguished himself by conspicuous gallantry and intrepidity at the risk of his life. above and beyond the call of duty. Sp4c. Wetzel was serving as door gunner aboard a helicopter which was part of an insertion force trapped in a landing zone by intense and deadly hostile fire. Sp4c. Wetzel was going to the aid of his aircraft commander when he was blown into a rice paddy and critically wounded by 2 enemy rockets that exploded just inches from his location. Although bleeding profusely due to the loss of his left arm and severe wounds in his right arm, chest, and left leg, Sp4c. Wetzel staggered back to his original position in his gun-well and took the enemy forces under fire. His machine gun was the only weapon placing effective fire on the enemy at that time. Through his own resolve he overcame the shock and intolerable pain of his injuries, Sp4c. Wetzel remained at his position until he had eliminated the automatic weapons emplacement that had been inflicting heavy casualties on the American troops and preventing them from moving against this strong enemy force. Refusing to tend to his own extensive wounds, he attempted to return to the aid of his aircraft commander but passed out from loss of blood. Regaining consciousness, he persisted in his efforts to drag himself to the aid of his fellow crewman. After an agonizing effort, he came to the side of the crew chief who was attempting to drag the wounded aircraft commander to the safety of a nearby dike. Unswerving in his devotion to his fellow man, Sp4c. Wetzel assisted his crew chief even though he lost consciousness once again during this action. Sp4c. Wetzel displayed extraordinary heroism in his efforts to aid his fellow crewmen. His gallant actions were in keeping with the highest traditions of the U.S. Army and reflect great credit upon himself and the Armed Forces of his country.

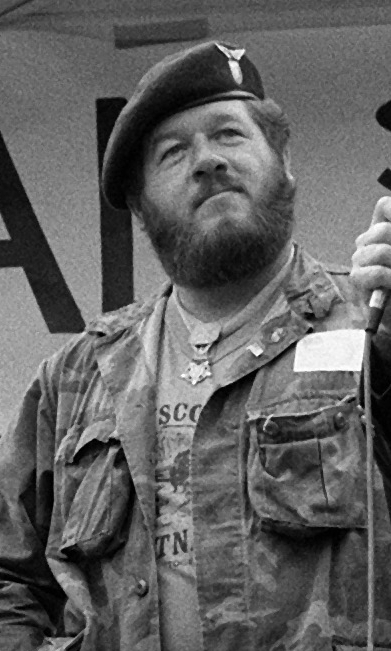
Wetzel in 1984

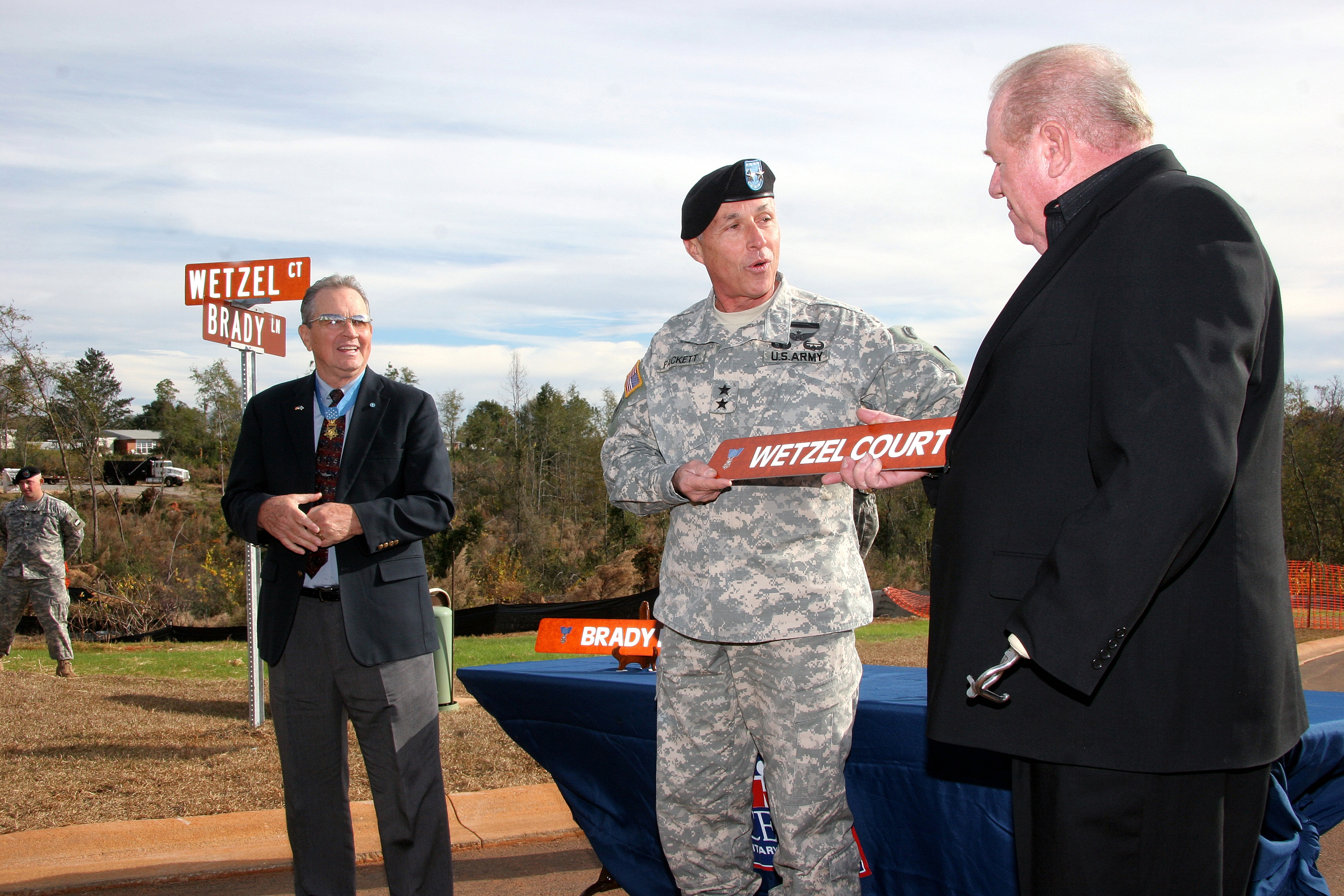
Wetzel (right) and fellow Medal of Honor recipient Patrick Brady (left) during a ceremony to name streets in their honor at Fort Rucker, Alabama, in 2007

== See also ==
- List of Medal of Honor recipients for the Vietnam War
