= Sugar City, Idaho =

- City
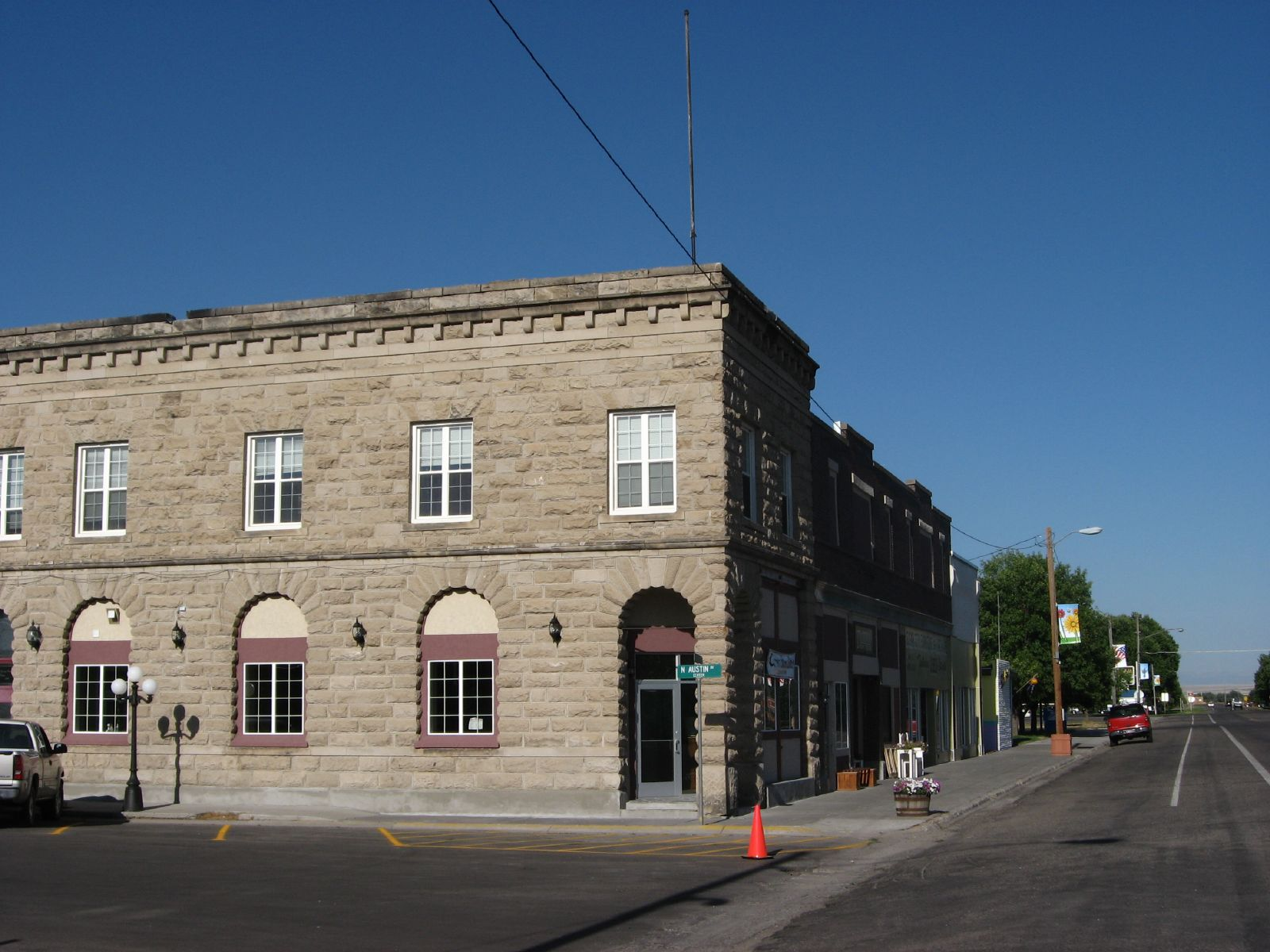

- Location in Madison County, Idaho

- Location within Idaho Location within the United States
- Coordinates: 43°52′24″N 111°45′05″W
- Country: United States
- State: Idaho
- County: Madison

Area
  - Total: 1.99 sq mi (5.16 km^{2})
  - Land: 1.98 sq mi (5.14 km^{2})
  - Water: 0.0077 sq mi (0.02 km^{2})
- Elevation: 4,899 ft (1,493 m)

Population (2020)
  - Total: 1,715
  - Density: 864.42/sq mi (333.75/km^{2})
- Time zone: UTC-7 (Mountain (MST))
  - Summer (DST): UTC-6 (MDT)
- ZIP code: 83448
- Area codes: 208, 986
- FIPS code: 16-78040
- GNIS feature ID: 2411993
- Website: www.sugarcityidaho.gov

Sugar City is a city in Madison County, Idaho, United States. The population was 1,715 at the 2020 census, up from 1,514 in 2010. It is part of the Rexburg Micropolitan Statistical Area.

== History ==
Sugar City was a company town for the Fremont County Sugar Company, which was part of the Utah-Idaho Sugar Company, supporting a sugar beet processing factory built in 1903–1904. Since it was created to support the factory, construction workers and early factory families were housed in tents, leading to the nickname "Rag Town". By 1904, the town consisted of 35 houses, two stores, a hotel, an opera house, several boarding houses, two lumber yards, a meat market, and a schoolhouse. The first Mormon ward was the Sugar City Ward, with Bishop Mark Austin. One of his counselors was James Malone, a construction engineer for E. H. Dyer, who was not a Mormon.

In early years the factory had a labor shortage, leading to a local community of Nikkei—Japanese migrants and their descendants.

The city was flooded by the waters of the Teton Dam collapse on June 5, 1976.

== Geography ==
Sugar City is located in northern Madison County. U.S. Route 20 runs along the western edge of the city, leading southwest 5 miles (8 km) to Rexburg and northeast 7 miles (11 km) to St. Anthony. Idaho State Highway 33 runs through the center of Sugar City, leading southwest 4.5 miles (7 km) to the center of Rexburg and east the same distance to Teton.

According to the United States Census Bureau, the city has a total area of 2.0 square miles (5.2 km^{2}), of which 0.01 square miles (0.03 km^{2}), or 0.50%, are water.

== Demographics ==
Historical population
Census	Pop.	Note	%±
1910	391		—
1920	680		73.9%
1930	621		−8.7%
1940	697		12.2%
1950	684		−1.9%
1960	584		−14.6%
1970	617		5.7%
1980	1,022		65.6%
1990	1,275		24.8%
2000	1,242		−2.6%
2010	1,514		21.9%
2020	1,715		13.3%
U.S. Decennial Census

=== 2020 census ===
As of the 2020 census, Sugar City had a population of 1,715. The median age was 27.0 years. 34.3% of residents were under the age of 18 and 11.8% of residents were 65 years of age or older. For every 100 females there were 94.4 males, and for every 100 females age 18 and over there were 90.7 males age 18 and over.

97.8% of residents lived in urban areas, while 2.2% lived in rural areas.

There were 512 households in Sugar City, of which 47.3% had children under the age of 18 living in them. Of all households, 71.7% were married-couple households, 7.2% were households with a male householder and no spouse or partner present, and 19.3% were households with a female householder and no spouse or partner present. About 12.7% of all households were made up of individuals and 7.5% had someone living alone who was 65 years of age or older.

There were 533 housing units, of which 3.9% were vacant. The homeowner vacancy rate was 1.0% and the rental vacancy rate was 5.8%.

Racial composition as of the 2020 census
Race	Number	Percent
White	1,466	85.5%
Black or African American	7	0.4%
American Indian and Alaska Native	3	0.2%
Asian	8	0.5%
Native Hawaiian and Other Pacific Islander	2	0.1%
Some other race	109	6.4%
Two or more races	120	7.0%
Hispanic or Latino (of any race)	219	12.8%

=== 2010 census ===
As of the census of 2010, there were 1,514 people, 419 households, and 373 families residing in the city. The population density was 850.6 inhabitants per square mile (328.4/km^{2}). There were 434 housing units at an average density of 243.8 per square mile (94.1/km^{2}). The racial makeup of the city was 91.3% White, 0.1% African American, 0.4% Native American, 0.3% Asian, 6.7% from other races, and 1.2% from two or more races. Hispanic or Latino people of any race were 10.9% of the population.

There were 419 households, of which 52.5% had children under the age of 18 living with them, 75.7% were married couples living together, 11.0% had a female householder with no husband present, 2.4% had a male householder with no wife present, and 11.0% were non-families. 10.3% of all households were made up of individuals, and 5.5% had someone living alone who was 65 years of age or older. The average household size was 3.61 and the average family size was 3.87.

The median age in the city was 24.8 years. 39.5% of residents were under the age of 18; 10.7% were between the ages of 18 and 24; 22% were from 25 to 44; 18.7% were from 45 to 64; and 9% were 65 years of age or older. The gender makeup of the city was 48.4% male and 51.6% female.

=== 2000 census ===
As of the census of 2000, there were 1,242 people, 326 households, and 292 families residing in the city. The population density was 1,582.5 inhabitants per square mile (611.0/km^{2}). There were 336 housing units at an average density of 428.1 per square mile (165.3/km^{2}). The racial makeup of the city was 92.83% White, 0.16% African American, 0.16% Native American, 0.81% Asian, 4.51% from other races, and 1.53% from two or more races. Hispanic or Latino people of any race were 8.29% of the population.

There were 326 households, out of which 57.4% had children under the age of 18 living with them, 80.7% were married couples living together, 7.7% had a female householder with no husband present, and 10.4% were non-families. 8.9% of all households were made up of individuals, and 3.1% had someone living alone who was 65 years of age or older. The average household size was 3.81 and the average family size was 4.08.

In the city, the population was spread out, with 40.6% under the age of 18, 10.9% from 18 to 24, 22.3% from 25 to 44, 19.5% from 45 to 64, and 6.8% who were 65 years of age or older. The median age was 24 years. For every 100 females, there were 101.6 males. For every 100 females age 18 and over, there were 95.8 males.

The median income for a household in the city was $45,500, and the median income for a family was $46,333. Males had a median income of $30,139 versus $22,917 for females. The per capita income for the city was $12,737. About 6.1% of families and 7.8% of the population were below the poverty line, including 10.5% of those under age 18 and 2.3% of those age 65 or over.

== Education ==
It is in the Sugar-Salem School District.

College of Eastern Idaho includes this county in its catchment zone; however this county is not in its taxation zone.

== Notable people ==
- Harold G. Hillam, emeritus general authority of the LDS Church
- Thomas C. Neibaur, first Mormon and first person born in Idaho to receive the Medal of Honor
- Laurel Thatcher Ulrich, Pulitzer-prize winning author of A Midwife's Tale

== See also ==
- List of cities in Idaho
- Teton Dam
