= Allen James Lynch =

U.S. Army soldier

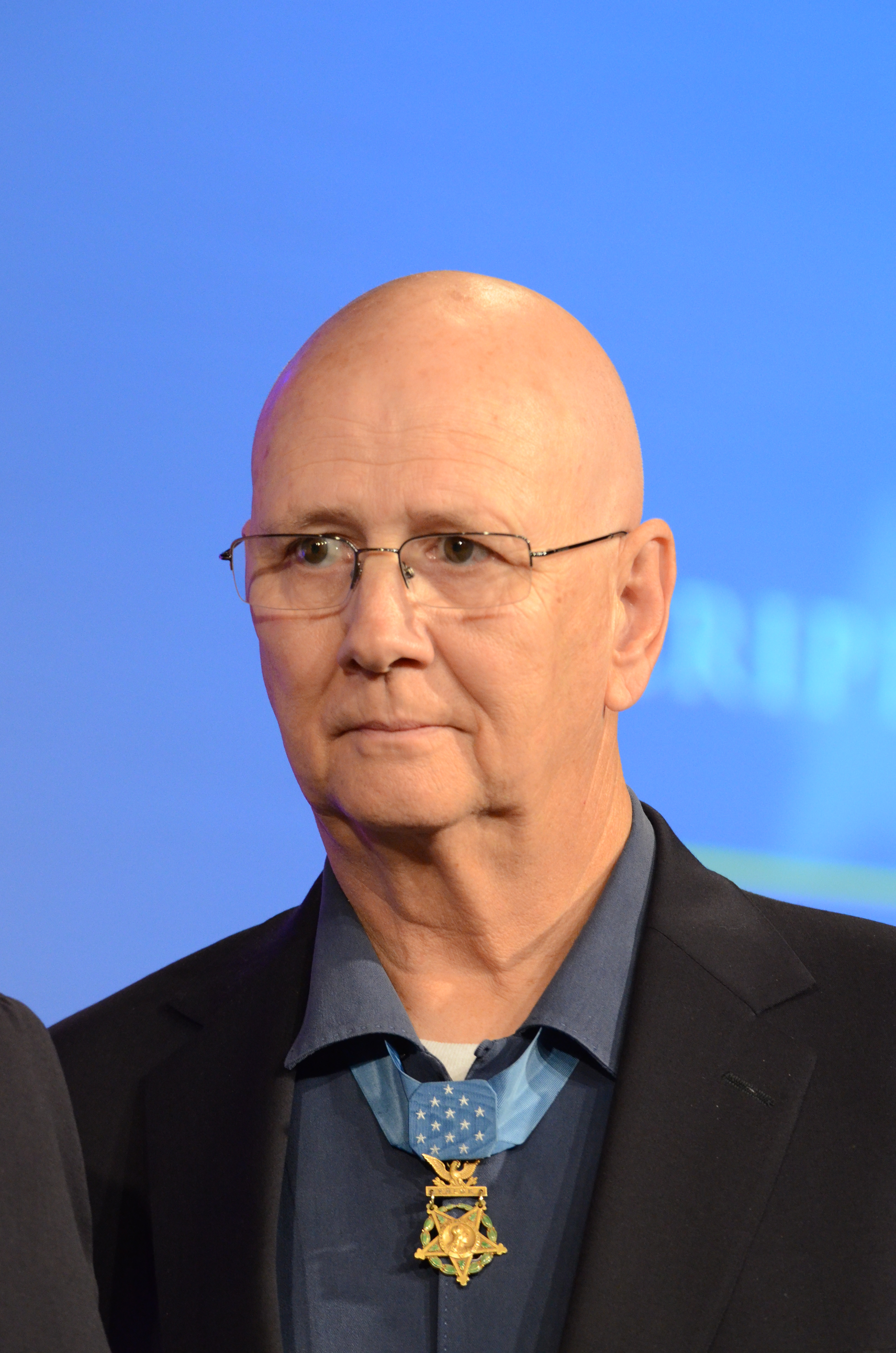
- Allen Lynch in 2014
- Born: October 28, 1945 (age 80); Chicago, Illinois
- Military career
- Allegiance: United States
- Branch: United States Army
- Service years: 1964–1969
- Rank: Sergeant
- Units: Company D, 1st Battalion, 12th Cavalry Regiment
- Conflicts: Vietnam War
- Awards: Medal of Honor

Allen James Lynch (born October 28, 1945) is a former United States Army soldier and a recipient of the United States military's highest decoration, the Medal of Honor, for his actions in the Vietnam War.

== Early life ==
Born on October 28, 1945, in Chicago, Lynch grew up in the Lake Eliza area of Porter County, Indiana, where he attended Union Center Elementary School and Wheeler Junior High School.

== Military career ==
Lynch joined the United States Army from Chicago in 1964, and by December 15, 1967, was serving as a specialist four in Company D, 1st Battalion (Airmobile), 12th Cavalry Regiment, 1st Cavalry Division (Airmobile). During a firefight on that day, near My An, Binh Dinh Province, Republic of Vietnam, Lynch rescued three wounded soldiers and stayed behind to protect them when the rest of the company withdrew. He single-handedly defended the wounded men against enemy attack until locating a friendly force that could evacuate them. Lynch was subsequently promoted to sergeant and awarded the Medal of Honor for his actions. The medal was formally presented to him by President Richard Nixon in 1970.

== Later life ==
After the war, Lynch settled in Gurnee, Illinois, and worked for the Department of Veterans Affairs, where he advocated increased benefits for disabled veterans. He later served as chief of the Illinois Attorney General's Veterans Rights Bureau until his retirement in 2005.

Lynch has volunteered for the Vietnam Veterans of America organization, is the liaison for the Congressional Medal of Honor Society, and frequently gives speeches at military-related events, such as Memorial Day ceremonies. Lynch's memoir, entitled Zero to Hero, was published in 2019.

== Medal of Honor citation ==
Medal of Honor

Rank and organization: Sergeant, U.S. Army, Company D, 1st Battalion (Airmobile), 12th Cavalry, 1st Cavalry Division (Airmobile). place and date: Near My An (2), Binh Dinh province, Republic of Vietnam, 15 December 1967. Entered service at: Chicago, Ill. Born: 28 October 1945, Chicago, Ill.

Citation:

For conspicuous gallantry and intrepidity in action at the risk of his life above and beyond the call of duty. Sgt. Lynch (then Sp4c.) distinguished himself while serving as a radio telephone operator with Company D. While serving in the forward element on an operation near the village of My An, his unit became heavily engaged with a numerically superior enemy force. Quickly and accurately assessing the situation, Sgt. Lynch provided his commander with information which subsequently proved essential to the unit's successful actions. Observing 3 wounded comrades Lying exposed to enemy fire, Sgt. Lynch dashed across 50 meters of open ground through a withering hail of enemy fire to administer aid. Reconnoitering a nearby trench for a covered position to protect the wounded from intense hostile fire, he killed 2 enemy soldiers at point blank range. With the trench cleared, he unhesitatingly returned to the fire-swept area 3 times to carry the wounded men to safety. When his company was forced to withdraw by the superior firepower of the enemy, Sgt. Lynch remained to aid his comrades at the risk of his life rather than abandon them. Alone, he defended his isolated position for 2 hours against the advancing enemy. Using only his rifle and a grenade, he stopped them just short of his trench, killing 5. Again, disregarding his safety in the face of withering hostile fire, he crossed 70 meters of exposed terrain 5 times to carry his wounded comrades to a more secure area. Once he had assured their comfort and safety, Sgt. Lynch located the counterattacking friendly company to assist in directing the attack and evacuating the 3 casualties. His gallantry at the risk of his life is in the highest traditions of the military service, Sgt. Lynch has reflected great credit on himself, the 12th Cavalry, and the U.S. Army.

== See also ==
- List of Medal of Honor recipients for the Vietnam War
