= Formations of the United States Army during the Vietnam War =

This article lists the units of the United States Army during the Vietnam War.

== Active Duty Divisions and Brigades in Theater ==
=== AirMobile Divisions ===
- 1st Cavalry Division
- 101st Airborne Division

=== Infantry Divisions ===
- 1st Infantry Division
- 4th Infantry Division
- 9th Infantry Division
- 23rd Infantry Division
- 25th Infantry Division

=== Independent Brigades ===
- 1st Brigade, 5th Infantry Division
- 1st Aviation Brigade
- 1st Signal Brigade
- 3rd Brigade, 82nd Airborne Division
- 11th Armored Cavalry Regiment
- 11th Infantry Brigade
- 18th Military Police Brigade
- 44th Medical Brigade
- 173rd Airborne Brigade
- 196th Infantry Brigade
- 198th Infantry Brigade
- 199th Infantry Brigade
- 18th Engineer Brigade (combat)
- 20th Engineer Brigade
- 223rd Aviation Brigade

== Active Duty Divisions not in Theater ==
=== Armored Divisions ===
- 1st Armored Division
- 2nd Armored Division
- 3rd Armored Division
- 4th Armored Division

=== Infantry Divisions ===
- 2nd Infantry Division
- 3rd Infantry Division
- 7th Infantry Division
- 8th Infantry Division
- 24th Infantry Division

== National Guard Divisions ==
=== Armored Divisions ===
- 30th Armored Division
- 50th Armored Division

=== Infantry Divisions ===
- 26th Infantry Division
- 28th Infantry Division
- 30th Infantry Division
- 38th Infantry Division
- 40th Infantry Division
- 42nd Infantry Division
- 47th Infantry Division
- 49th Infantry Division
