= Operation Cocoa Beach =

Part of the Vietnam War (1966)

- Part of the Vietnam War
Date	3–8 March 1966
Location	near Lai Khê, Bình Dương Province, South Vietnam 11.195°N 106.617°E
Result	US victory

Belligerents
United States	Viet Cong

Commanders and leaders
Col. William Brodbeck	unknown

Units involved
3rd Brigade, 1st Infantry Division	272nd Regiment

Casualties and losses
15 killed	199 killed

Operation Cocoa Beach was a US Army operation that took place along Highway 13 near Lai Khê, lasting from 3 to 8 March 1966.

== Prelude ==
After unsuccessful attempts to lure large enemy units into combat in Operation Crimp (8–14 January 1966) and Operation Mastiff (21–27 February 1966), Colonel William Brodbeck, commander of the 3rd Brigade, 1st Infantry Division decided to reduce the size of units sent into the field in order to invite enemy attack. The plan called for a series of battalion sized operations around Bau Bang west of Highway 13, north of Lai Khê, where the Viet Cong 272nd Regiment of the 9th Division was believed to be operating.

== Operation ==
On 3 March the 2nd Battalion, 28th Infantry Regiment marched into the Lo Ke Rubber Plantation west of Bau Bang and established a patrol base.

On 4 March patrols discovered trenches that could be used as jumping off positions for an attack on the patrol base.

In the early morning of 5 March a patrol led by 2Lt Robert John Hibbs detected movement north of the base. At dawn they observed a supply column of children and armed women to the northeast of the base which met up with a company of VC coming from the north. The VC and some of the supply column moved south towards the patrol, which then triggered two Claymore mines and began engaging the VC. The patrol then disengaged and moved back to the base, fighting through another enemy unit 100m from the base perimeter. Hibbs and his sergeant stopped to help a wounded man, but were hit by VC machine-gun fire, Hibbs then attacked the machine-gun position and was mortally wounded. The VC then launched an attack on the northern perimeter of patrol base but were repulsed and then started attacking from multiple directions. Airstrikes were called in and by mid-morning the VC withdrew.

At 10:50 the 1st Battalion, 16th Infantry Regiment was deployed by helicopter to a landing zone 2km northeast of the patrol base in an attempt to block the retreating attackers. The Battalion moved southwest towards the patrol base engaging a small VC unit and reached the patrol base at 14:30.

On 6 March the 2nd Battalion, 2nd Infantry Regiment was also deployed into the area and the three Battalions swept the area finding only VC dead and equipment. The operation concluded on 8 March 1966.

== Aftermath ==
Operation Cocoa Beach was a US tactical success. Total US casualties were 15 killed, while US claimed VC losses were 199 killed (body count).

Hibbs was posthumously awarded the Medal of Honor on 24 February 1967.
