= Bowesmont, North Dakota =

- Ghost Town
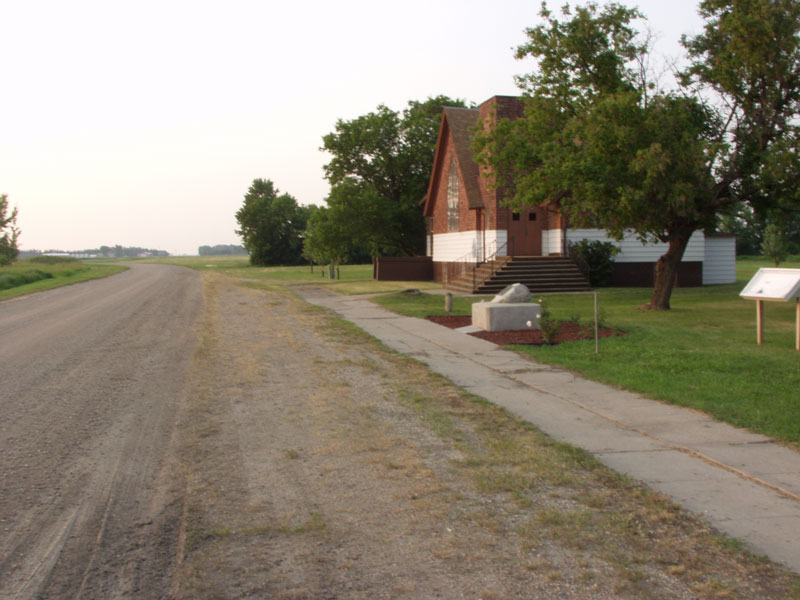
- Last original structure in Bowesmont, the Methodist church

- Location within North Dakota Location within the United States
- Coordinates: 48°41′24″N 97°10′41″W
- Country: United States
- State: North Dakota
- County: Pembina
- Elevation: 794 ft (242 m)
- Time zone: UTC-6 (Central (CST))
  - Summer (DST): UTC-5 (CDT)
- Area code: 701
- GNIS feature ID: 1028097

Bowesmont is a ghost town in Pembina County, North Dakota, United States. Bowesmont is located along a BNSF Railroad line near Interstate 29, 8.2 miles (13.2 km) north of Drayton.

== History ==
The community was initially named Alma for Alma, Ontario in 1878; the name was changed to Bowesmont, for William Bowes, the town's first shopkeeper, six months later. According to legend, Bowes won the right to name the town in a card game. The population was 131 in 1940.

The terrain in the area was flat enough that Bowesmont was affected every time the nearby Red River rose past flood stage. As part of long-term mitigation efforts after the 1997 Red River flood, the properties in town were purchased by the federal government and the structures removed or relocated. The only remnant of Bowesmont today is the Methodist church and an equipment yard. Former area residents return to the church each July on the second Sunday to commemorate the town.

== Notable person ==
- Harold Keith Johnson, Chief of Staff of the United States Army from 1964 to 1968
