= Harold Keith Johnson =

US Army general (1912–1983)

Harold K. Johnson
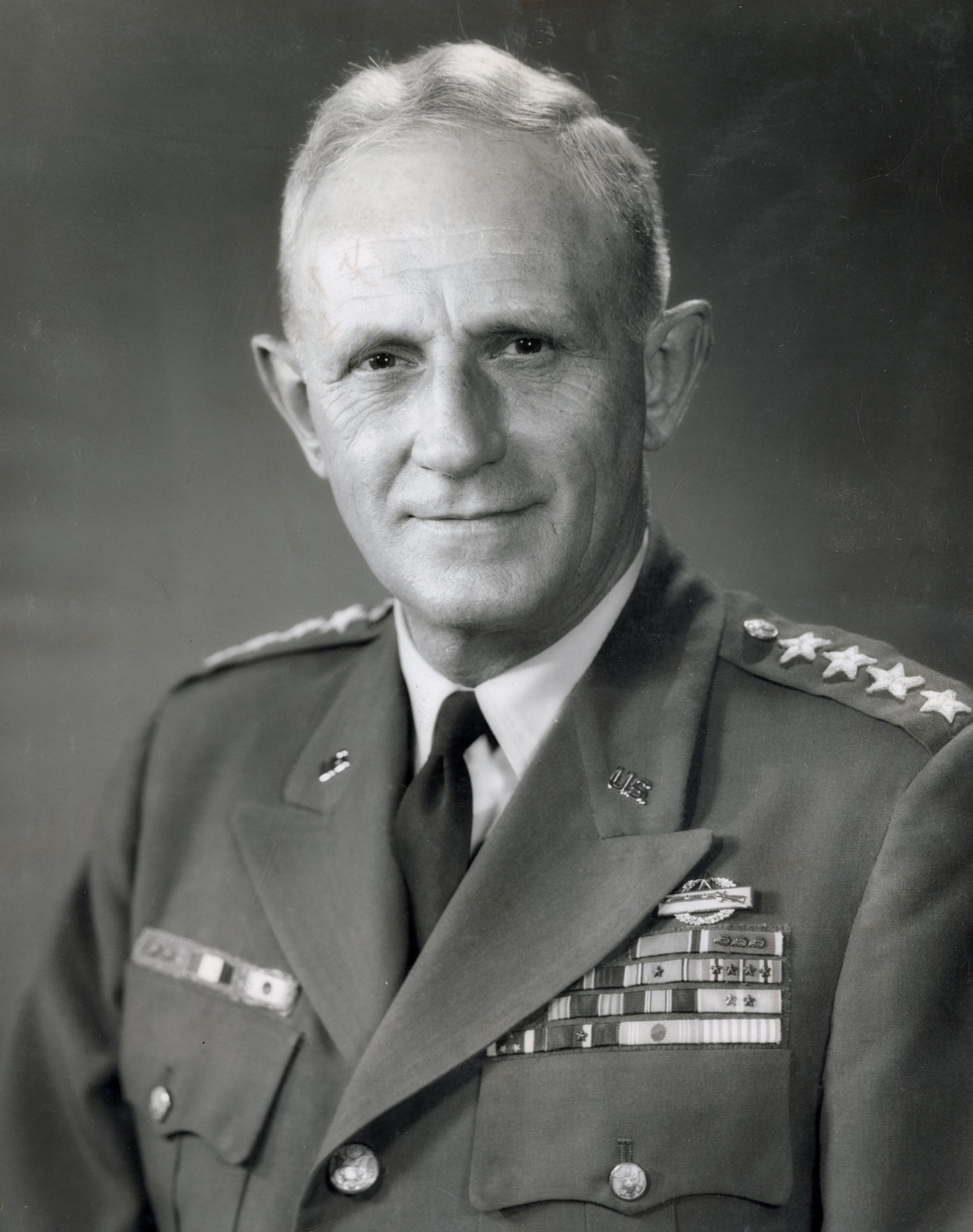
- Johnson in 1965
- Born: 22 February 1912; Bowesmont, North Dakota, U.S.
- Died: 24 September 1983 (aged 71); Washington, D.C., U.S.
- Burial place: Arlington National Cemetery
- Education: United States Military Academy; United States Army Command and General Staff College; Armed Forces Staff College; National War College
- Military career
- Allegiance: United States
- Branch: United States Army
- Service years: 1930–1968
- Rank: General
- Nickname: Johnny
- Unit: Infantry Branch
- Commands: United States Army Command and General Staff College; 8th Infantry Division (acting); 8th Cavalry Regiment; 5th Cavalry Regiment; 3rd Battalion, 8th Cavalry Regiment; 3rd Battalion, 7th Infantry Regiment; 3rd Battalion, 57th Infantry Regiment; L Company, 57th Infantry Regiment; Headquarters Company, 28th Infantry Regiment; M Company, 3rd Infantry Regiment; C Company, 3rd Infantry Regiment
- Conflicts: World War II; Battle of Bataan (POW); Korean War; Battle of the Pusan Perimeter; Breakout from the Pusan Perimeter; September 1950 counteroffensive; Invasion of North Korea; Second Phase Offensive; Battle of the Ch'ongch'on River; UN Forces retreat from North Korea; Third Battle of Seoul; Operation Thunderbolt; Operation Rugged; Operation Dauntless; Chinese spring offensive; UN May–June 1951 counteroffensive; Vietnam War
- Awards: Distinguished Service Cross; Army Distinguished Service Medal (2); Legion of Merit (4); Bronze Star Medal

Harold Keith Johnson (22 February 1912 – 24 September 1983) was a United States Army general who served as Chief of Staff of the United States Army from 1964 to 1968. Regarded as a premier tactician, Johnson became skeptical that the level of resources given to the Vietnam War, much of which went into 'find, fix, and destroy the big main force units' operations, could deliver victory. Johnson came to believe that the Communist forces held a trump card, because they controlled whether there were engagements with U.S. forces, giving an option to simply avoid battle with U.S. forces if the situation warranted it.

== Early life ==
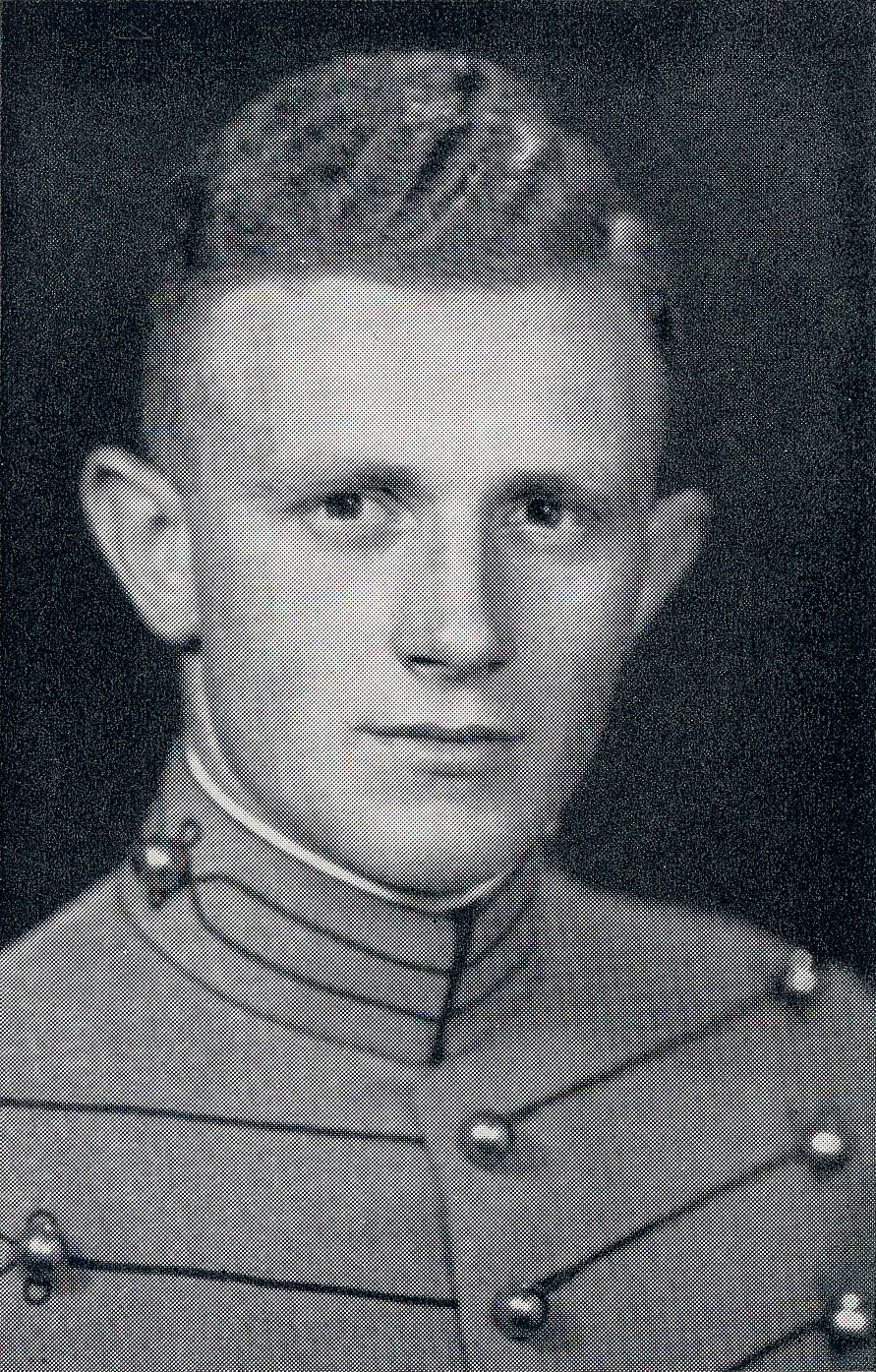
Johnson as a United States Military Academy cadet c. 1933

Harold Keith Johnson was born in Bowesmont, North Dakota, on 22 February 1912. After graduation from high school in 1929, Johnson attended the United States Military Academy, West Point, New York. On June 13, 1933, he graduated USMA class of 1933 and was commissioned as a second lieutenant in the infantry. Johnson's first duty assignment was with the 3rd Infantry (Old Guard) at Fort Snelling, Minnesota.

== Military career ==
In 1938, Johnson attended Infantry School at Fort Benning. Upon graduation, he was assigned to the 28th Infantry at Fort Niagara, New York. Requesting an overseas transfer, Johnson was reassigned to the 57th Infantry (Philippine Scouts) at Fort McKinley, Philippine Islands in 1940.

=== World War II ===
After the Battle of Bataan, Johnson became a prisoner of war (POW) of the Japanese on 9 April 1942. Participating in the Bataan Death March, Johnson was eventually imprisoned at Camp O'Donnell, Cabanatuan and Bilibid Prison. In December 1944, the Japanese attempted to transfer Johnson and 1,600 other POWs out of the Philippines. On 14 December 1944, American fighter planes sank the Japanese ship Ōryoku Maru, killing over 300 of the POWs. Johnson survived and was eventually transferred to Japan. Unwilling to give up their POWs to the advancing Allies, Japan again transferred Johnson. Finally ending up in Inchon Prison Korea, Johnson was liberated by the 7th Infantry Division on 7 September 1945.

=== Korean War and rise to senior command ===
After Johnson's return to the United States, his first assignment was with the Ground Forces School. In August 1946, he attended the Command and General Staff College at Fort Leavenworth, Kansas, where he remained as an instructor for another two years. Johnson next attended the Armed Forces Staff College in Norfolk, Virginia, in 1949. After graduation, he was assigned as commanding officer, 3rd Battalion, 7th Infantry at Fort Devens, Massachusetts.

Johnson organized the 1st Provisional Infantry Battalion at Fort Devens and, in August 1950, he was dispatched to Korea. The battalion became the 3rd Battalion, 8th Cavalry Regiment, assigned to the 1st Cavalry Division for the defense of the Pusan Perimeter. Still with the 1st Cavalry Division, Johnson was later promoted to command the 5th and the 8th Cavalry Regiments. In February 1951, he was reassigned as assistant chief of staff, G3 of I Corps.

Returning to the United States, Johnson was assigned to the office of the chief of the Army Field Forces, Fort Monroe, Virginia. In 1952, he attended the National War College. After graduation, Johnson was assigned to the office of the assistant chief of staff, G3, where he served first, as chief of Joint War Plans Branch, then as the assistant to the chief of the Plans Division, and finally as the executive officer of the assistant chief of staff.

In January 1956, Johnson was assigned to duty as assistant division commander of the 8th Infantry Division at Fort Carson, Colorado. Later in 1956, he transferred with the 8th Division to West Germany. Johnson's next assignment was as chief of staff, Seventh Army Headquarters at Stuttgart-Vaihingen. Then in April 1959, Johnson moved to Headquarters, United States Army Europe as assistant chief of staff, G3. The following December, he was appointed chief of staff, Central Army Group (CENTAG) at NATO Headquarters concerned with planning for the employment of French, German, and American troop operations in Central Europe.

Returning to the United States, Johnson was assigned as commandant, Command and General Staff College, Fort Leavenworth, Kansas. In February 1963, he became assistant deputy chief of staff for military operations (operations and plans), Department of the Army, and in July was appointed as deputy chief of staff for military operations.

=== Chief of Staff ===
On 3 July 1964, Johnson was appointed the 24th Chief of Staff of the United States Army; his reputation as an expert tactician led to him being selected over candidates with more seniority. He had told the National Guard Association that year that "military force ... should be committed with the object beyond war in mind" and "broadly speaking, the object beyond war should be the restoration of stability with the minimum of destruction, so that society and lawful government may proceed in an atmosphere of justice and order."

==== Vietnam War ====
Johnson went to Vietnam in December 1965 after the Battle of Ia Drang. He "concluded that it had not been a victory at all and that Westmoreland's big-unit strategy was misconceived". However, Johnson publicly said there was no alternative to disrupting enemy main force units in the Central Highlands as preventing them from establishing base areas in the middle of the country was essential. After talking to junior officers involved in the first major actions, Johnson concluded that enemy main force units had the ability to evade engagements, giving them the option to keep casualties below an acceptable level, but they were in fact accepting the actual kill ratios being achieved, as evidenced by them attacking United States forces. Johnson started the process to have Westmoreland replaced in Vietnam, and commissioned the PROVN Study, which noted that "aerial attacks and artillery fire, applied indiscriminately, also have exacted a toll on village allegiance." There was a deep-seated reluctance among the Joint Chiefs of Staff to interfere with the command decisions of Westmoreland, but harassing artillery fire, by United States forces at least, was greatly reduced.

As Johnson saw it, the communist units would always keep their casualties below what they considered a prohibitive level, and could not be swept away by US firepower. He did, however, acknowledge that the U.S. Commander in Vietnam, General William Westmoreland, had little choice but to engage the enemy's main formations, which had to be prevented from securing base areas where they could concentrate. Johnson was instrumental in altering the focus to a counterinsurgency approach, but was frustrated at the US Congress' refusal to provide the manpower necessary for successful pacification. In his later years Johnson said it had been obvious that US national mobilization was required to win in Vietnam, and he regretted not resigning in protest at the government asking the army to fight a war without hope of ultimate victory.

==== Conditions for enlisted personnel ====
As chief of staff, one of Johnson's noteworthy accomplishments was creating the office of the Sergeant Major of the Army to improve the quality of life for enlisted personnel. He selected Sergeant Major William O. Wooldridge to be the first to hold this post. The other services rapidly followed suit so that for decades there has been a single senior enlisted member of each. Johnson also served as acting chairman of the Joint Chiefs of Staff for a few months in 1967 during the convalescence of General Earle Wheeler.

Johnson retired from active duty in July 1968. For three years, General Johnson headed the Freedoms Foundation at Valley Forge and afterwards worked as a banking executive until retiring for good.

== Final years ==
Johnson married Dorothy Rennix in 1935. During his term as chief of staff, he had been involved in many policy debates regarding the escalation of the Vietnam War as a proponent of full military mobilization to achieve a pacification of South Vietnam. He considered resigning in protest over President Lyndon B. Johnson's decision not to mobilize the reserves, and at the end of his life expressed regret at not doing so. He was the subject of a biography, Honorable Warrior, by Lewis Sorley. Johnson died on 24 September 1983, in Washington, D.C. Johnson came to regret not opposing the escalation of the Vietnam War, lamenting that "I am now going to my grave with that lapse in moral courage on my back." He was buried in Arlington National Cemetery.

== Decorations and awards ==

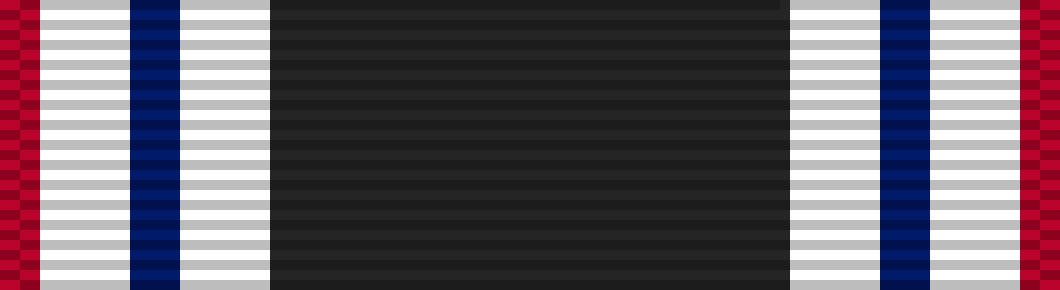

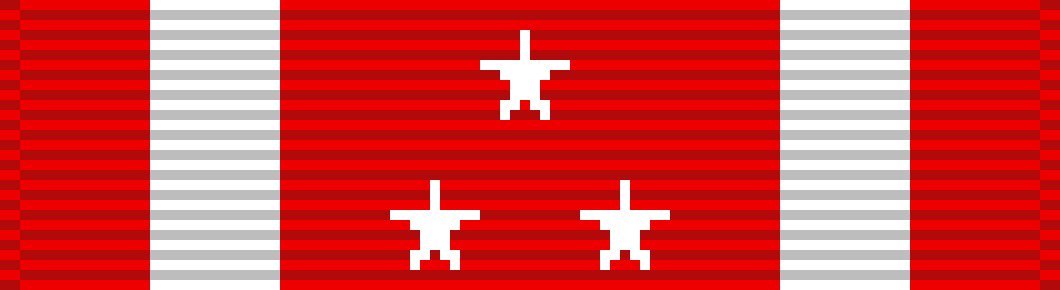

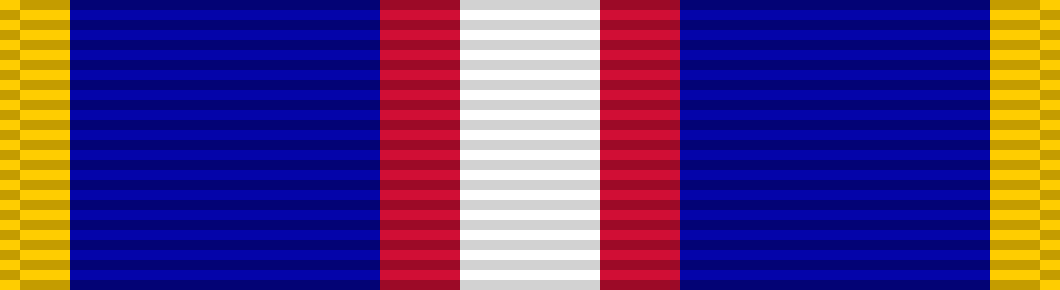

Badge	Combat Infantryman Badge with Star denoting 2nd award		
1st row	Distinguished Service Cross		
2nd row	Army Distinguished Service Medal with 1 Oak leaf cluster	Legion of Merit with 3 Oak leaf clusters	Bronze Star Medal
3rd row	Prisoner of War Medal	American Defense Service Medal with "Foreign Service" clasp	American Campaign Medal
4th row	Asiatic-Pacific Campaign Medal with 4 Campaign stars	World War II Victory Medal	National Defense Service Medal
5th row	Korean Service Medal with 6 Campaign stars	Philippine Defense Medal with 1 Campaign star	Philippine Liberation Medal with 2 Campaign stars
6th row	Philippine Independence Medal	United Nations Service Medal Korea	Korean War Service Medal
Unit awards	Presidential Unit Citation with 2 Oak leaf clusters	Philippine Presidential Unit Citation	Korean Presidential Unit Citation

Foreign Awards

Order of National Security Merit Cheon-Su Medal		Order of National Security Merit Sam-Il Medal
Philippine Legion of Honor; Legionnaire	AFP Long Service Medal	Order of Military Merit Grand Cross

=== Distinguished Service Cross citation ===
Johnson, Harold K.
Lieutenant Colonel (Infantry), U.S. Army
3d Battalion, 8th Cavalry Regiment (Infantry), 1st Cavalry Division
Date of Action: 4 September 1950

Citation:

The President of the United States of America, under the provisions of the Act of Congress approved 9 July 1918, takes pleasure in presenting the Distinguished Service Cross to Lieutenant Colonel (Infantry) Harold K. Johnson, United States Army, for extraordinary heroism in connection with military operations against an armed enemy of the United Nations while serving as Commanding Officer of the 3d Battalion, 8th Cavalry Regiment (Infantry), 1st Cavalry Division. Lieutenant Colonel Johnson distinguished himself by extraordinary heroism in action against enemy aggressor forces near Tabu-dong, Korea, on 4 September 1950. When his battalion had been forced to withdraw from their hill position by a series of fierce attacks by an overwhelming number of the enemy, Colonel Johnson immediately directed a counterattack in an attempt to regain the vitally important dominating terrain. Placing himself with the most forward elements in order to more effectively direct and coordinate the attack, Colonel Johnson rallied his men and led them forward. Moving about exposed to the heavy enemy artillery, mortar and small-arms fire, he directed fire, assigned positions and, by personal example, proved the necessary incentive to stimulate and keep the attack moving. When his battalion began to falter due to the devastating enemy fire, Colonel Johnson moved forward to close proximity of the enemy to establish and personally operate a forward observation post. Remaining in this exposed position, he directed effective mortar counter fire against the enemy. When his mortars became inoperable and his casualties very heavy due to the tremendous firepower and numerically superior enemy forces, he realized the necessity for withdrawal. Remaining in the position until the last unit had withdrawn, he directed the salvaging of both weapons and equipment. Reestablishing a new defensive position, he reorganized his battalion and supervised medical attention and evacuation of the wounded. His conspicuous devotion to duty and selfless conduct under enemy fire provided an inspiring example to his men and prevented a serious penetration of friendly lines.

== Dates of rank ==
No insignia	Cadet, United States Military Academy: 1 July 1929
	Second lieutenant, Regular Army: 13 June 1933
	First lieutenant, Regular Army: 13 June 1936
	Captain, Army of the United States: 9 September 1940
	Major, Army of the United States: 19 December 1941
	Lieutenant colonel, Army of the United States: 7 April 1942
	Captain, Regular Army: 13 June 1943
	Colonel, Army of the United States: 2 September 1945
	Lieutenant colonel, Army of the United States: 1 May 1946 (Reduced in rank.)
	Major, Regular Army: 15 July 1948
	Lieutenant colonel, Regular Army: 28 July 1950
	Colonel, Army of the United States: 30 December 1950
	Brigadier general, Army of the United States: 1 January 1956
	Colonel, Regular Army: 1 February 1956
	Major general, Army of the United States: 1 July 1959
	Brigadier general, Regular Army: 22 May 1960
	Major general, Regular Army: 5 November 1962
	Lieutenant general, Army of the United States: 1 July 1963
	General, Army of the United States: 1 July 1964
	General, Regular Army, Retired: 30 June 1968

== See also ==
Military offices
Preceded by Earle G. Wheeler	Chief of Staff of the United States Army; 1964–1968	Succeeded by William C. Westmoreland
Preceded by Lionel C. McGarr	Commandant of the Command and General Staff College; 1960–1963	Succeeded by Harry Jacob Lemley, Jr.
