= Gary L. Miller =

United States Army officer (1947–1969)

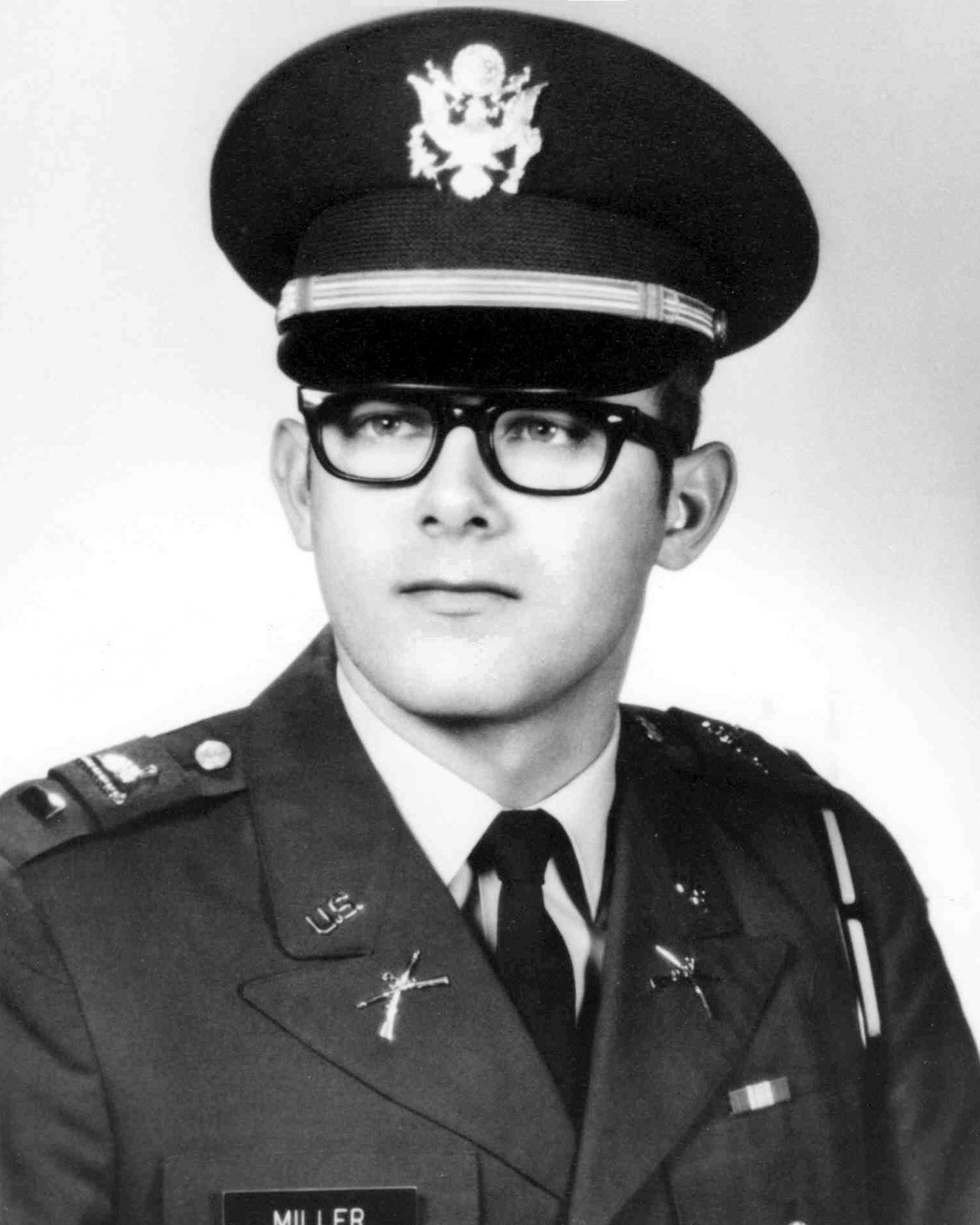
- Portrait of Miller, c. 1968
- Born: Gary Lee Miller; March 19, 1947; Covington, Virginia, US
- Died: February 16, 1969 (aged 21); Bình Dương, South Vietnam
- Burial place: Alleghany Memorial Park, Covington, Virginia
- Military career
- Allegiance: United States
- Branch: United States Army
- Service years: 1967–1969
- Rank: First Lieutenant
- Units: 28th Infantry Regiment, 1st Infantry Division
- Conflicts: Vietnam War †
- Awards: Medal of Honor; Purple Heart

Gary Lee Miller (March 19, 1947 – February 16, 1969) was a United States Army officer and a recipient of the United States military's highest decoration—the Medal of Honor—for his actions in the Vietnam War.

== Biography ==
Miller joined the Army from Roanoke, Virginia in 1967, and by February 16, 1969, was serving as a first lieutenant in Company A, 1st Battalion, 28th Infantry Regiment, 1st Infantry Division. On that day, in Bình Dương Province, South Vietnam during Operation Toan Thang II, Miller smothered the blast of an enemy-thrown grenade with his body, sacrificing his life to protect those around him. Before his Army service, Miller had attended the Clifton Forge–Covington Branch of Virginia Tech (today the independent Mountain Gateway Community College); he was honored by Virginia Tech in 2020.

Miller, aged 21 at his death, was buried in Alleghany Memorial Park in his birth city of Covington, Virginia.

== Medal of Honor citation ==
First Lieutenant Miller's official Medal of Honor citation reads:

For conspicuous intrepidity and gallantry in action at the risk of his life above and beyond the call of duty. First Lt. Miller, Infantry, Company A, was serving as a platoon leader at night when his company ambushed a hostile force infiltrating from Cambodian sanctuaries. After contact with the enemy was broken, 1st Lt. Miller led a reconnaissance patrol from their prepared positions through the early evening darkness and dense tropical growth to search the area for enemy casualties. As the group advanced they were suddenly attacked. First Lt. Miller was seriously wounded. However, the group fought back with telling effect on the hostile force. An enemy grenade was thrown into the midst of the friendly patrol group and all took cover except 1st Lt. Miller. who in the dim light located the grenade and threw himself on it, absorbing the force of the explosion with his body. His action saved nearby members of his patrol from almost certain serious injury. The extraordinary courage and selflessness displayed by this officer were an inspiration to his comrades and are in the highest traditions of the U.S. Army.

== See also ==
- List of Medal of Honor recipients
- List of Medal of Honor recipients for the Vietnam War
