= United States Army during the Vietnam War =

United States Army
- Founded: June 14, 1775
- Country: United States
- Type: Army
- Role: Land warfare
- Part of: United States Armed Forces; Department of the Army
- Headquarters: The Pentagon; Arlington County, Virginia, U.S.
- Motto: "This We'll Defend"
- Colors: Black, gold and white
- March: "The Army Goes Rolling Along"
- Mascot: Army Mules
- Equipment: List of U.S. Army equipment

Commanders
- Commander-in-Chief: President Lyndon B. Johnson; Richard Nixon Gerald Ford
- United States Department of Defense: Robert S. McNamara; Clark M. Clifford; Melvin Laird; James R. Schlesinger
- Secretary of the Army: Stanley Resor; Robert Froehlke; Bo Callaway
- Chief of Staff: GEN Harold K. Johnson; William C. Westmoreland; Creighton W. Abrams Jr. Frederick C. Weyand

The Vietnam War (1955-1975) confronted the US Army with a variety of challenges, both in the military context and at home. In the dense jungles of Vietnam, soldiers faced a motivated enemy who often used guerrilla tactics, while the difficult terrain, tropical diseases and the threat of ambushes strained the morale and effectiveness of the troops. At the same time, the conflict led to tensions in the USA: criticism was voiced, for example, regarding conscription and the unequal distribution of the burden - particularly at the expense of the working class and ethnic minorities.

Administrative and organizational reforms of the US Army between the end of the Korean conflict and the entry into the Vietnam War brought significant modernization and innovation (focused mostly on a conflict in Central Europe). The specific demands of the Vietnam War - especially warfare in difficult terrain - revealed the limits of these reforms. While the army was technically well equipped, it suffered from a lack of strategic adaptation and an unbalanced manning policy that at times limited its effectiveness in the conflict.

== Leadership, control and organization ==
During the Vietnam War, command of the Army was vested in the President, just as it is today. The Secretary of the Army, or the Office of the Secretary of the Army, was responsible for training, equipping and managing the Army. Within the Office there were four Assistant Secretaries of the Army: Financial Management, Research and Development, Manpower and Reserve Affairs and Installation and Logistics. These in turn reported to the Under Secretary of the Army.

In addition, the Secretary of the Army was assisted by the Administrative Assistant, the General Council, the Chief of Public Information and the Chief of Legislative Liaison. The Secretary of the Army was assisted by the Army Staff, which consisted of the Chief of Staff, the Army General Staff and the Special Staff. The Chief of Staff was the highest military officer of the Secretary of Defense. As a member of the Joint Chief of Staff, he was an advisor to the President, the National Security Council and the Secretary of Defense. Within the Army, he was responsible to the Secretary of the Army and for the administration, training and supply of the Army.

The Chief of Staff headed the Office of the Chief of Staff, which consisted of the Vice Chief of Staff, the Safeguard System Manager, the Director for Civil Disturbance Planning and Operations, the Advanced Aerial Fire Support System Manager, the Assistant Vice Chief of Staff and the Secretary of the General Staff.The Chief of Staff also has 9 other assistants at his disposal: the Deputy Chief of Staff for Military Operations, the Deputy Chief of Staff for Personnel, the Deputy Chief of Staff for Logistics, the Comptroller of the Army, the Chief of Research and Development, the Chief of Reserve Components and the Assistant Chiefs of Staff for Force Development and Intelligence and Communications-Electronics. In addition, 14 Special Staff Officers were assigned to the Chief of Staff.

=== Division ===
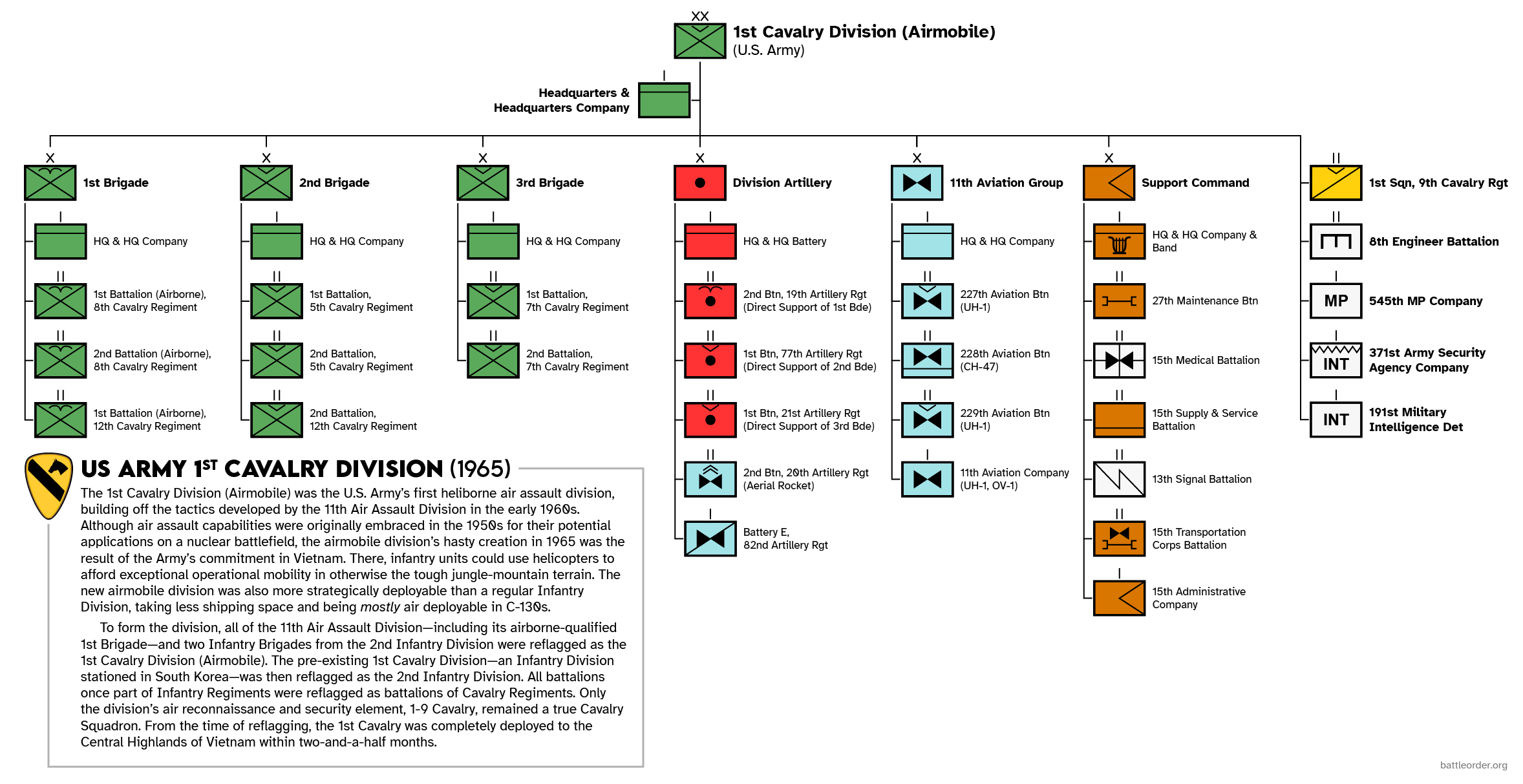
Organization of the U.S. Army 1st Cavalry Division when it was converted into an airmobile division for deployment to Vietnam in 1965.

The divisions were reorganized as part of the Reorganization Objective Army Division (ROAD) structure. The reorganization had begun with the reorganization of the Airborne Divisions in 1964 and the creation of the first Airmobile Division in 1965. There were five types of divisions: Infantry, Mechanized Infantry, Tank, Airborne and Airmobile Divisions. The basis for the realignment was the realization that a standard division was not capable of fulfilling all tasks. It was necessary for divisions to be specialized to some degree and to have a flexible structure that could be tailored to the requirements of different levels of conflict, terrain, climate, enemy capabilities and other conditions. In 1968, the strength of an infantry division was between 15,800 and 19,000 men.

=== Brigade Battalion Company and Platoon ===
Brigades consisted of different numbers of battalions and support units. A group corresponded to a regiment in terms of echelon, but consisted of a different number and type of attached battalions and companies. Organizationally, there were two types of battalions: Fixed battalions with a staff and a prescribed number of organic units in company strength, permanently assigned to the battalion and designated by letters (e.g. A-D). These included combat units as well as support and service units. Flexible battalions with the staff as the only organic unit.

Separately numbered support/service companies and detachments of different types were subordinated to the battalion in order to adapt it to its mission. Regardless of their type, the infantry battalions had a common basic structure. The battalions had a strength of 800 to 1,000 soldiers, divided into 3 Rifle Companies (A-C) and a Combat Support Company; from 1967, a further Rifle Company (D) was added.

The battalion's staff headquarters consisted of the CO, the XO, the staff officers and the sergeant major. The battalion's staff company was divided into a company staff, a section of the battalion staff with staff assistants and specialists, and several platoons.

- Communications Platoon: Responsible for the installation, operation and maintenance of the battalion's radio, wire and courier communications systems.
- Support Platoon: Responsible for the transportation of the battalion and the supply of rations, water, ammunition, fuel, oil and lubricants to the companies.
- Maintenance Platoon: Responsible for the inspection, testing, maintenance, repair and recovery of equipment
- Medical Platoon: Responsible for medical care, treatment and evacuation of casualties and containing the spread of disease.

Each rifle company consisted of three platoons. A platoon was the basic tactical unit within a US Army infantry company during the Vietnam War. An infantry platoon typically consisted of 30 to 40 soldiers, divided into a command group (lieutenant, platoon sergeant) and four squads. The exact number of soldiers could vary depending on casualties, reinforcements or the mission.

== Recruitment ==
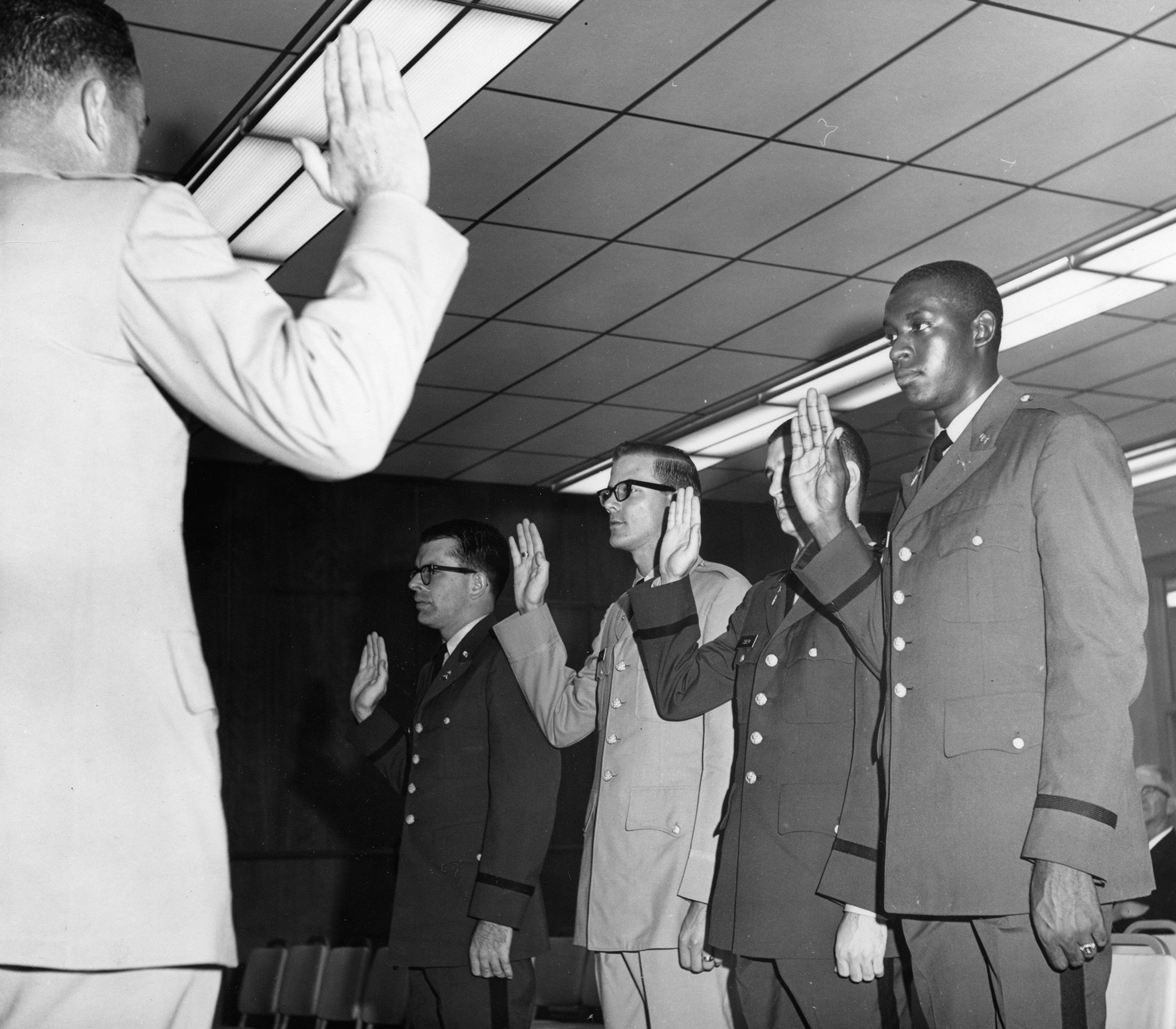
Oscar K. Chamber, first African-American Reserve Officers' Training Corps graduate, Arlington State College; left to right, Thomas M. Darnall, Douglas W. Spruill, Eddie W. Osburn, and Oscar K. Chambers

Under the Selective Service Act of 1948, all men were required to register for the draft at the age of 18. This allowed entry up to the age of 27. At the beginning of the US ground offensive in 1965, the number of conscripts made up less than a third of the army. Upon reaching the age of 18, they were required to register with the local draft board, fill out a classification questionnaire and undergo a pre-enlistment physical to determine their status and the possibility of deferment or exemption. Monthly quotas were allocated to the more than 4,000 conscription offices. The system of deferments and exemptions was based on a variety of criteria, including physical qualifications, education, major employment, family hardship and religious beliefs.

Essential workers included police officers, firefighters, physicians, teachers, clergy and students of theology, and certain categories of scientists and engineers. Married men with or without children, post-secondary students, men caring for elderly parents, and other hardship cases were generally given lower priority for I-A status, but beginning in 1966, when the number of draftees was increased to 30,000 per month, such individuals were also called up. The peak year for conscription was 1966, when new divisions, brigades and support units were established and existing units were upgraded for deployment in Vietnam: 382,000 were drafted. After that it was well over 200,000 per year until it dropped off in 1970.

Within a few weeks of registering, the men had to complete a classification questionnaire to assess their fitness for service. A classification of I-A meant that they were eligible for conscription. I-C, I-D, I-O, I-S, I-W, and I-Y were deferments for police, ROTC, conscientious objectors, high school students, conscientious objectors doing civilian work, or those drafted only in the event of a declaration of war. I-A, I-B and I-S were exemptions for critical occupations, farm workers and students. III-A was an exception for cases of extreme hardship or children. IV-A, IV-B, IV-C, IV-D, and F applied to persons with prior military service or a single surviving son, government officials, resident aliens who were not required to serve, clergymen or theology students, and the physically or mentally unfit.

Enlistment was for two years, followed by four years in the Ready Reserve after leaving active duty. Men who volunteered for three years in the regular Army reported to local Army recruiting offices. They could select their MOS (Military Occupation Specialty) based on their scores on the Armed Forces Classification Test (AFCT). The test results assessed aptitude in areas such as clerical, electronics, general maintenance, mechanical maintenance and technical specialist. Most important was the score in General Technical (GT), which is comparable to an IQ. An infantryman had to achieve a minimum GT score of 70, a Special Forces soldier 100 and an officer candidate 110.

Many blacks and Hispanics volunteered to join the Airborne, either because they could prove themselves there or simply because they could send extra money home to their families. The GI Bill, which could be used to pay for a college education upon completion of active duty, was a major motivator for many, regardless of ethnicity or social status. Volunteers could enlist under the Delayed Entrance Program, even if they were still in high school, and delay their entry for up to six months. The deferment period did not count against their service obligation, but did count against the time needed for promotion. Before being called up, they had to undergo a medical examination, which was repeated when they entered the service to ensure that they still met the requirements. There was also a buddy program where two or more friends could enlist and be guaranteed to complete at least BCT (Basic Combat Training) and perhaps AIT (Advanced Individual Training) together if they had the same MOS.

== Training ==
=== Enlisted men ===
The basic training lasted 8 weeks and was used for firearms training, orientation about the army, the legal system to which they were now subject, the Code of Conduct, which governed their behavior in combat and as prisoners, and the General Orders, which defined the requirements of guard duty. They also underwent fitness training and received instruction in first aid. There were endurance runs, circuit training and weight training exercises. Also quite common were the Army Daily Dozen 12 exercises each such as side bends, toe touches, side straddle jump, windmill, squats, flutter kicks, crunches, lunges, 8-fold push-ups or running on the spot.

The physical contact confidence training included obstacle and confidence exercises, as well as several hours of combat training with the bayonet and eight hours of close combat training. Individual tactical training included day and night movement techniques and camouflage. Two full weeks were devoted to firearms training, assembly and disassembly, care and cleaning, zeroing, shooting at known distances and combat shooting. The latter was known as Trainfire I and consisted of the shooter firing at targets while standing, kneeling, crouching, prone and in the trench. A further eight hours were devoted to conducting combat shooting as a group and a close combat course in which two trainees covered each other with live ammunition.

The infiltration course offered a high degree of realism, stress and confidence building. At night, the recruits entered a trench that ran perpendicular to the line of fire of several machine guns. From the trench, they crawled towards the machine guns, which fired tracer rounds over their heads as they crawled through barbed wire obstacles and detonated explosive charges. At regular intervals, spotlights mounted on poles lit up to simulate flares, causing the crawling recruits to pause and wait until they were extinguished before crawling on. Basic training ended with a graduation ceremony and a short break before the next phase of training began.

The men assigned to the infantry went to one of the many schools to begin training in their specialty; some attended a two-week leadership preparation course in order to be deployed as squad leaders and platoon leaders. The men were divided into training companies with three platoons and a support platoon. During the extended training, which also lasted 8 weeks, the men were taught tactics, close combat, patrol duty and orientation. The men were taught all types of weapons, from pistols and grenade launchers to rocket launchers and the .50-caliber machine gun.

Other topics included survival training, handling radios, mines and booby traps, and for the first time, the men received specific information about the type of warfare they would encounter in Vietnam. Some trainees volunteered for the Airborne Basic Course at Fort Benning, provided they had passed the three-week Airborne Physical Fitness Test and completed five parachute jumps.

=== Officers ===
Officer training during the Vietnam War was based on a combination of several methods. These included the United States Military Academy at West Point, the Reserve Officers Training Corps (ROTC), and the Officers Canditate Schools (OCS). A potential candidate for West Point first had to receive a nomination. Approximately 85% of the nominations available each year were made by members of Congress for citizens of their states or congressional districts. Appointments were made through competitive examinations from several eligible groups. Forty nominations were available at any time for the sons of deceased or 100 percent disabled veterans of all recognized wars or conflicts, including Vietnam. Annually, 170 appointments were awarded on a competitive basis to Regular Army and Reserve soldiers.

Sons of members of the regular forces, and of reserve officers, still on active duty with at least eight years of service, could apply for 100 cadet positions reserved annually for appointment by the President. There was no limit on the number of sons of Medal of Honor recipients. OCS candidates were recruited either from the pool of soldiers, especially NCOs, or from college graduates with a bachelor's degree. Soldiers were nominated by their commanding officers or applied for OCS themselves. This route was common for soldiers who had already proven their skills in training or deployment. Candidates underwent additional tests, including aptitude tests, physical examinations and selection interviews. College graduates received 8 weeks of basic training and 9 weeks of advanced individual training before beginning the OCS course.

During the 14-week course for male officers and the 18-week course for female officers of the Women's Army Corps (WAC), they underwent a selection process that prepared them for assignment as junior officers of their division. Recruitment for ROTC was aimed primarily at college students. The program offered the opportunity to fulfill military obligations while completing a college education. It was especially attractive to those who wanted to avoid enlistment in the Army as a soldier. Junior Division ROTC recruiters actively visited high schools and encouraged graduates to enroll in colleges that offered ROTC programs. Students were offered the opportunity to combine a military education with a college education. ROTC scholarships were heavily advertised and offered financial incentives such as tuition coverage, monthly stipends, and book allowances for qualified students.

Senior Division ROTC recruiters targeted students from civilian colleges and universities. While the Junior Division, ROTC, offered military training in secondary schools, there was a 4-year and a 2-year program for the Senior Division. The 4-year program included a 2-year basic course followed by a 2-year advanced course with a six-week summer training camp usually attended between the junior and senior years. The 2-year program was designed for students who for some reason were unable to complete the basic course. This category included transfer students from junior colleges who did not have an ROTC program. Instead of the basic course, they attended a six-week summer camp before taking the advanced course. Participation in ROTC was initially mandatory for most male college students. However, during the Vietnam War, many colleges began making participation voluntary.

=== Pay ===
Flag officer
	under 2 years	over 2 years	over 3 years	over 4 years	over 6 years	over 8 years	over 10 years	over 12 years	over 14 years	over 16 years	over 18 years	over 20 years
General of the Army	1956	2025	""	""	""	2103	""	2264	""	2426	""	2588
General	1956	2025	""	""	""	2103	""	2264	""	2426	""	2588
Lieutenant-General	1734	1779	1818	""	""	1863	""	1941	""	2103	""	2264
Major-General	1570	1617	1656	""	""	1779	""	1863	""	1941	2025	2103
Brigade-General	1305	1394	""	""	1456	""	1540	""	1617	1779	1902	""

Senior officer
	under 2 years	over 2 years	over 3 years	over 4 years	over 6 years	over 8 years	over 10 years	over 12 years	over 14 years	over 16 years	over 18 years	over 20 years
Colonel	967	1063	1132	""	""	""	""	""	1170	1356	1425	1456
Lieutenant-Colonel	773	909	971	""	""	""	1001	1054	1125	1209	1278	1317
Major	652 $	793 $	847 $	""	862 $	901 $	962 $	1016 $	1063 $	1109	1140 $	""

Junior officer
	under 2 years	over 2 years	over 3 years	over 4 years	over 6 years	over 8 years	over 10 years	over 12 years	over 14 years	over 16 years	over 18 years	over 20 years
Captain	606 $	677 $	723 $	801 $	839 $	870 $	916 $	962 $	985 $	""	""	""
First Lieutenant	486 $	577 $	693 $	716 $	731 $	""	""	""	""	""	""	""
Second Lieutenant	417 $	462 $	577 $	""	""	""	""	""	""	""	""	""

Non-commissioned officers
	under 2 years	over 2 years	over 3 years	over 4 years	over 6 years	over 8 years	over 10 years	over 12 years	over 14 years	over 16 years	over 18 years	over 20 years
Chief Warrant officer 4	617 $	662 $	"" $	677 $	708 $	739 $	770 $	824 $	862 $	893 $	916 $	947 $
Chief Warrant officer 3	561 $	609 $	"" $	616 $	624 $	669 $	708 $	731 $	754 $	777 $	801 $	832 $
Chief Warrant officer 2	491 $	531 $	"" $	547 $	577 $	609 $	632 $	654 $	677 $	701 $	723 $	747 $
Warrant officer	409 $	469 $	"" $	508 $	531 $	554 $	577 $	600 $	624 $	647	669	693

Enlisted rank
	under 2 years	over 2 years	over 3 years	over 4 years	over 6 years	over 8 years	over 10 years	over 12 years	over 14 years	over 16 years	over 18 years	over 20 years
Sergeant Major							701	717	734	750	767	782
Master Sergeant						588	605	621	637	653	669	685
Sergeant First Class	369	443	459	476	492	507	524	540	564	580	597	605
Staff Sergeant	318	387	403	419	435	451	468	492	507	524	532	
Sergeant	275	339	355	371	395	411	427	443	451			
Corporal	231	290	306	330	347							
Private first class	167	233	249	266								
Private	138	193	""	""	""	""	""	""	""	""	""	""

=== Promotion ===
During the Vietnam War, eligible officers were placed on various promotion lists according to their affiliation with Army departments. In order to be included on one of these lists, the person in question had to have received a positive evaluation in an Officer Evaluation Report (OER). The promotion applied to both the regular army and the reserve and could be granted for a limited or unlimited period. In addition, promotion was dependent on vacancies to be filled. The evaluation of an OER was usually done by the officer's direct superior, e.g. a company or battalion commander (at the rank of major or lieutenant colonel). The evaluation focused on:

- Leadership skills: How effectively did the officer lead his subordinates?
- Tactical competence: How well did the officer apply military knowledge and skills?
- Initiative and Commitment: Was the officer proactive and decisive in performing his duties, especially in stressful situations such as the Vietnam War?
- Character and integrity: Did the officer demonstrate moral strength and exemplary behavior?
- Achievements in the field: Particularly during the Vietnam War, performance in combat was emphasized, e.g. through successful missions or effective leadership in combat.

A promotion was recommended or rejected on the basis of defined criteria. Another officer (senior rater) of higher rank (e.g. brigade or division commander, usually a colonel) reviewed the evaluation and added a higher-level assessment. The senior rater provided a relative assessment of how the officer compared to his peers (e.g., "top 5% of captains in the brigade"). This assessment was critical to making the promotion list. After a positive recommendation by the senior rater, the officer was placed on the promotion list. The list was then forwarded to the Promotion Selection Board.

The Promotion Selection Board was a committee that made the final decision on promotion. It was composed of experienced officers, typically ranging in rank from Lieutenant Colonel to General, to ensure that different perspectives were considered. The Selection Board evaluated the candidate based on performance, experience and potential. After review, candidates were either labeled: Fully Qualified for Promotion, Best Qualified for Promotion, Selected for Retention in Grade or Not selected.

The Fully Qualified for Promotion rating was awarded to all Medical and Dental Corps officers eligible for promotion to Major or Lieutenant Colonel, as well as officers on all promotion lists to Captain. Best Qualified for Promotion was selected for temporary promotion to Colonel and, with the exception of Medical and Dental Corps officers, to Lieutenant Colonel and Major. Selected for Retention in Grade designated officers whose current performance did not currently warrant promotion, but could warrant future promotion.

Another option was promotion by length of service (time-in-grade). To counteract the stagnation in promotions, promotions were determined independently of vacancies. Thus, all qualified 2nd Lieutenants were promoted to 1st Lieutenant after 3 years of service. A first lieutenant was promoted to captain after 7 years of service; a captain was promoted to major after 14 years of service and a major was promoted to lieutenant colonel after 21 years of service. Under the Officer Personnel Act of 1947, percentages were established for each permanent rank in the Regular Army. The promotion of officers, thus depended on vacancies below the authorized rank strength.

== Medical Service ==
=== Medical Service Corps ===
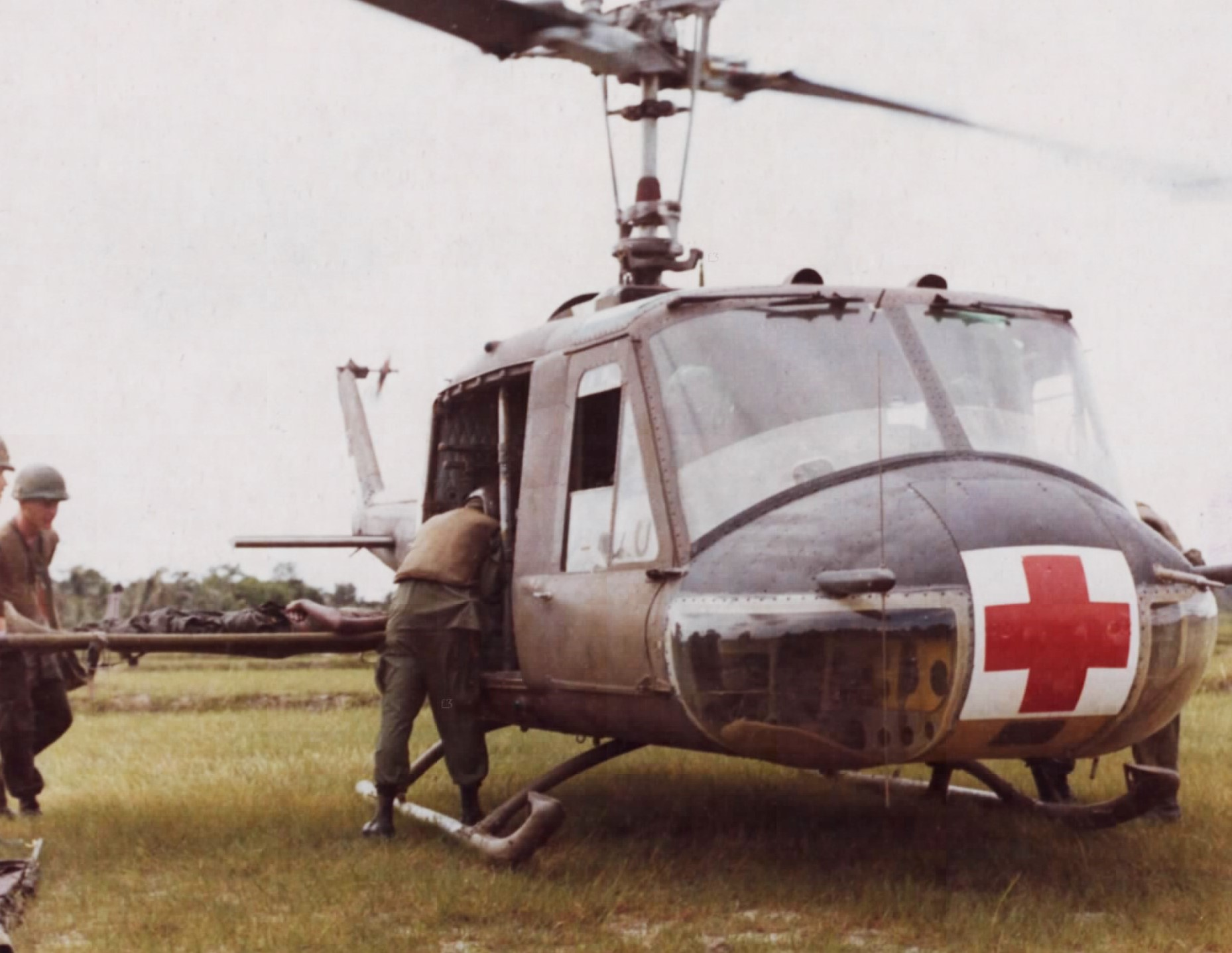
UH-1D helicopters airlift the wounded in the Xa Ba Phoc Province area during Operation Wahiawa, search and destroy mission conducted by the 25th Infantry Division.

The Medical Service Corps played a critical role in medical care, logistics and administration during the Vietnam War. The Medical Service Corps was divided into four divisions: Pharmacy, Supply and Administration, Ancillary Medical Sciences, Sanitation, and Ophthalmology.The four divisions were further subdivided into twenty different specialties. With the exception of Pharmacy, Supply and Administration, where changes were made, Medical Service officers remained in their specialty throughout their careers.

The specialties included in the Medical Allied Sciences Section were: medical entomology, audiology, medical laboratory sciences (physiology, bacteriology, biochemistry, immunology, parasitology, allied laboratory sciences, nuclear medicine, psychology, sociology, clinical laboratory nutrition), and podiatry. Pharmacy, Supply, and Administration included occupations such as Pharmacy Officer, Field Medical Assistant, Medical Supply Officer, Maintenance Officer, Adjutant, Supply Officer, Personnel Officer, Management Analyst, Automated Data Processing Systems Officer, Administrative Officer, Registrar, Comptroller, and Machine Records Officer.

Medical officers were typically recruited from ROTC and trained at Brooke Army Medical Center, Fort Sam in Houston, or the Medical Service Veterinary School Chicago. Programs at these institutions included basic military training as well as advanced training for elements of all corps and specialties of the Medical Department. MSC basic training lasted 16 weeks and was followed by twenty-one weeks of advanced training.

=== Army Nurse Corps ===
Recruiting nurses for the Vietnam War posed an entirely different challenge than in previous wars, where thousands of nurses had volunteered for military service. Recruiters for the Vietnam War faced the challenge of recruiting nurses for the ANC. They had to deal with a variety of issues, including the controversy surrounding the war, changing public opinion about the roles of women and men, and changing definitions of nursing. Nurses learned administrative and record-keeping procedures, Army protocol and hierarchy, the organization of the Medical Department, and methods of treating common war wounds during six weeks of basic training. Preparation for war also included a tour of a makeshift Vietnamese village and map-reading practice.

=== Treatment ===
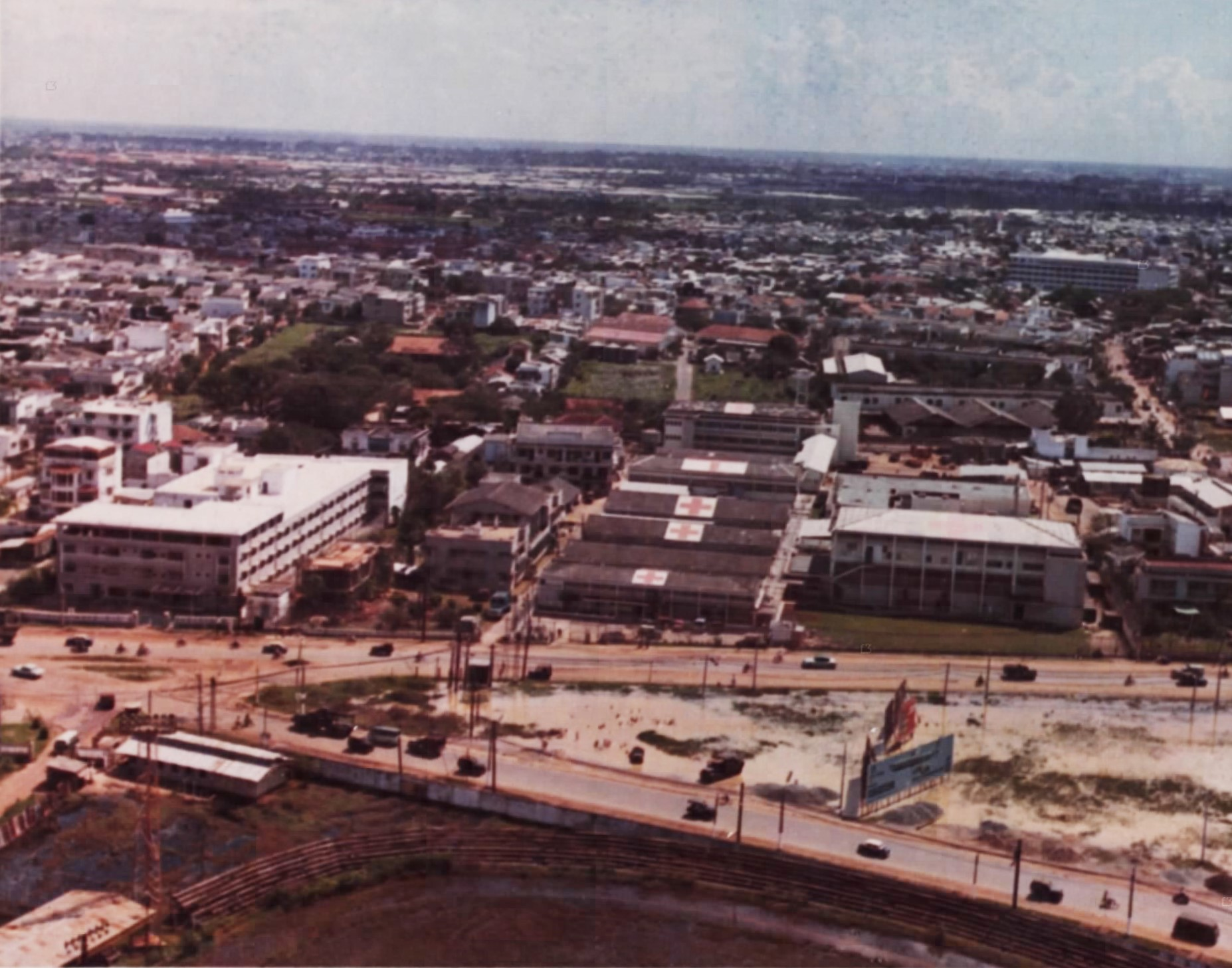
3rd Field Hospital and Tan Son Nhut intersection NARA

Medical care for the wounded in the US Army during the Vietnam War was a complex, multi-stage system aimed at maximizing the chances of survival of the injured. Treatment and evacuation was heavily influenced by the systematic use of helicopters (MEDEVAC, Medical Evacuation), which made it possible to quickly remove the wounded from the battlefield and transport them to medical facilities. The Vietnam War was the first conflict in which helicopters were systematically used for medical evacuation. The average time between wounding and arrival at a medical facility was around 35 to 45 minutes.

The helicopters were often equipped with medical personnel who could initiate life-saving measures during transportation, e.g. oxygen administration, infusions or resuscitation. After evacuation from the battlefield, the wounded were taken to a nearby field hospital. Field surgeons, anaesthetists and medical staff worked there to perform life-saving surgical procedures. The focus was on stabilizing the wounded before further evacuation to a better equipped hospital. If the wound was more serious and required more extensive treatment, the wounded were transferred to a next-level military hospital.

== Women's Army Corps ==
Originally established during World War II, a dozen WAC officers were transferred to his headquarters and to the newly established U.S. Army Vietnam (USARV) headquarters in 1965 at the request of General Westmoreland to fill noncombat duty positions. In late 1965, General Westmoreland requested an additional 15 WACs for MACV headquarters. By June 1970, more than 20 women were working at MACV headquarters. The officers and NCOs assigned to MACV and USARV proved so helpful that the following year General Westmoreland requested another detachment of WACs - mainly typists - for headquarters, USARV and other U.S. commands in Vietnam.

In early 1967, about 80 female soldiers arrived and were assigned to the WAC Detachment. The maximum number of WACs deployed in Vietnam was reached in January 1970: 20 officers and 139 enlisted women. In 1972, the withdrawal of all US troops from Vietnam began. After six years, the WAC Detachment, USARV, was disbanded in September 1972 and most of the women returned to the US, where they were reassigned. A few officers and enlisted women remained in Saigon until May 1973. In total, about 700 women officers and enlisted men served in Vietnam between 1962 and 1973. The Women's Army Corps was disbanded by Congress in October 1978. Thereafter, women entering the Army were no longer assigned to the WAC, but to all other branches of the service (e.g., enlisted, military police, intelligence, etc.) with the exception of combat troops.

== War crimes ==
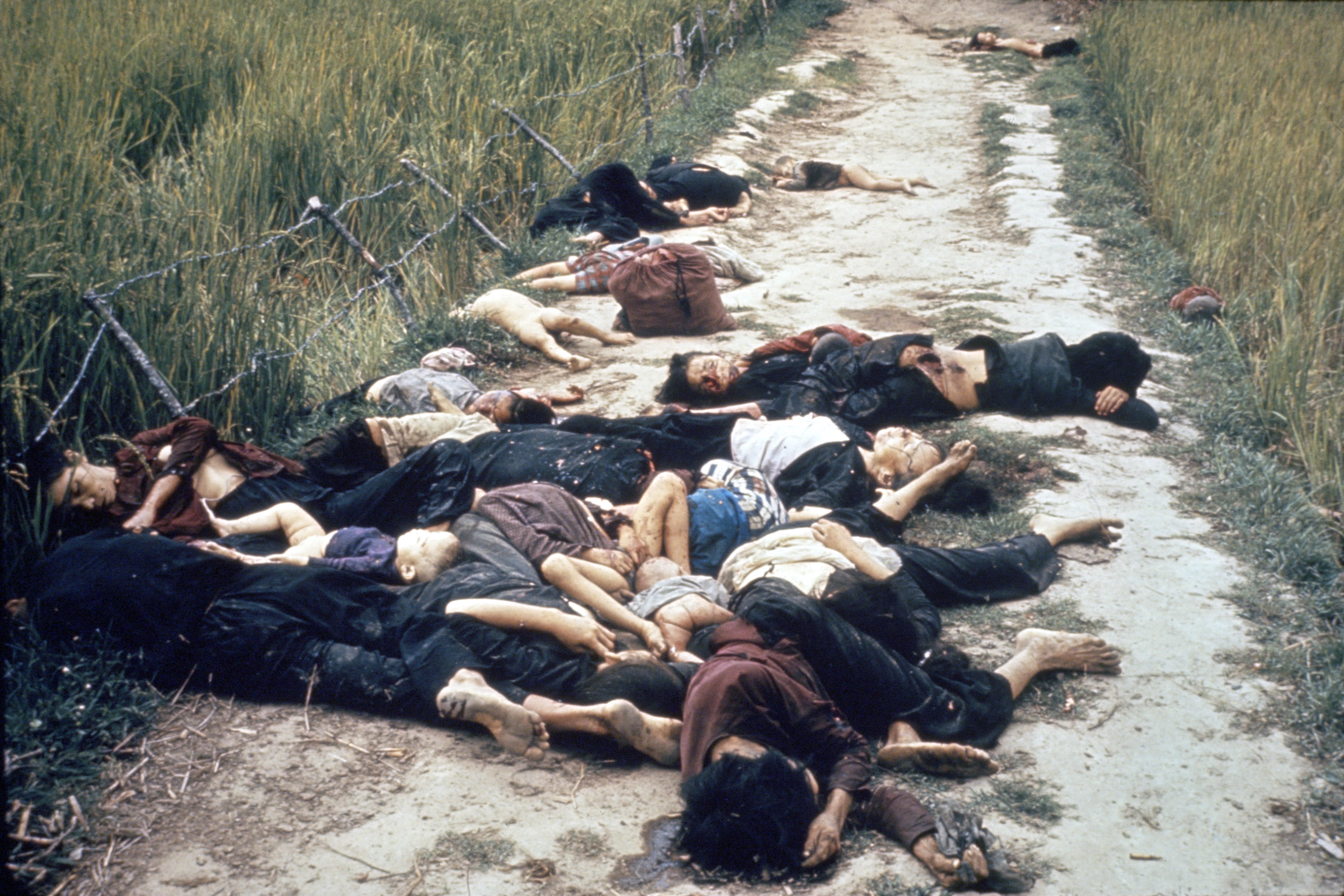
Photo taken by United States Army photographer Ronald L. Haeberle on March 16, 1968 in the aftermath of the My Lai massacre showing mostly women and children dead on a road.

Numerous war crimes were committed by the United States Army during the war including massacres, torture, indiscriminate bombing, destruction of villages, and more.

The most infamous war crime was the My Lai massacre on March 16, 1968, in which soldiers of "Charlie Company" massacred up to 504 civilians, including women, children and elderly people. Some victims were raped and mutilated beforehand. The investigation of these war crimes was inadequate. In the case of the My Lai massacre, the US army initially tried to cover up the incident until a whistleblower, Ron Ridenhour, made the atrocities public in 1969. A commission of inquiry confirmed the crimes, but only one soldier, Second Lieutenant William Calley, was convicted. His life sentence was later reduced to 3.5 years house arrest. Senior officers went unpunished.

Other controversial incidents include Operation Speedy Express, which ran from December 1968 to May 1969, and was described in an anonymous letter by a participating soldier as "a My Lai each Month". The official US body count of enemy combatants was 10,889 killed but this was accused of being exaggerated and of including civilians. The US Army Inspector General estimated that there were 5,000 to 7,000 civilian casualties from the operation.

The widespread use of Agent Orange, a chemical defoliant aimed at destroying vegetation and crops used by the PAVN/VC, has also been described as a war crime. It led to massive environmental damage and long-term health consequences that affected millions of Vietnamese people as well as US soldiers who were exposed. Torture practices such as electric shocks or waterboarding of prisoners were also used often in collusion with South Vietnamese forces.

== Decline ==
As the war progressed, particularly in the late years (1968-1973), the U.S. Army in Vietnam faced an increasing disintegration of discipline, morale and effectiveness. This condition resulted from a combination of factors, including the long duration of the war, growing opposition to the war in the United States, inequities within the troops, and the psychological stresses of guerrilla warfare. The Vietnam War was an asymmetrical conflict in which the U.S. Army fought against the North Vietnamese Army (NVA) and the Viet Cong, who pursued guerrilla tactics.

The battles often took place in unknown, jungle-covered terrain, which made the conventional tactics of the US army ineffective. Soldiers were constantly exposed to the danger of ambushes, landmines and deadly traps, leading to high levels of stress, exhaustion and the onset of psychological disorders such as post-traumatic stress disorder (PTSD). Many soldiers turned to drugs such as marijuana, heroin or amphetamines to cope with the psychological stress.

Drug abuse undermined discipline and contributed to a decline in the effectiveness of the troops, and despite the significant superiority of the US troops in terms of technology and resources, no clear military success could be recorded. The war developed into a war of attrition in which the US suffered heavy losses without making any visible progress. This resulted in a feeling of frustration and futility among the soldiers. This could lead to refusal to obey orders or to so-called fragging, the targeted killing of superior officers

== Resistance ==
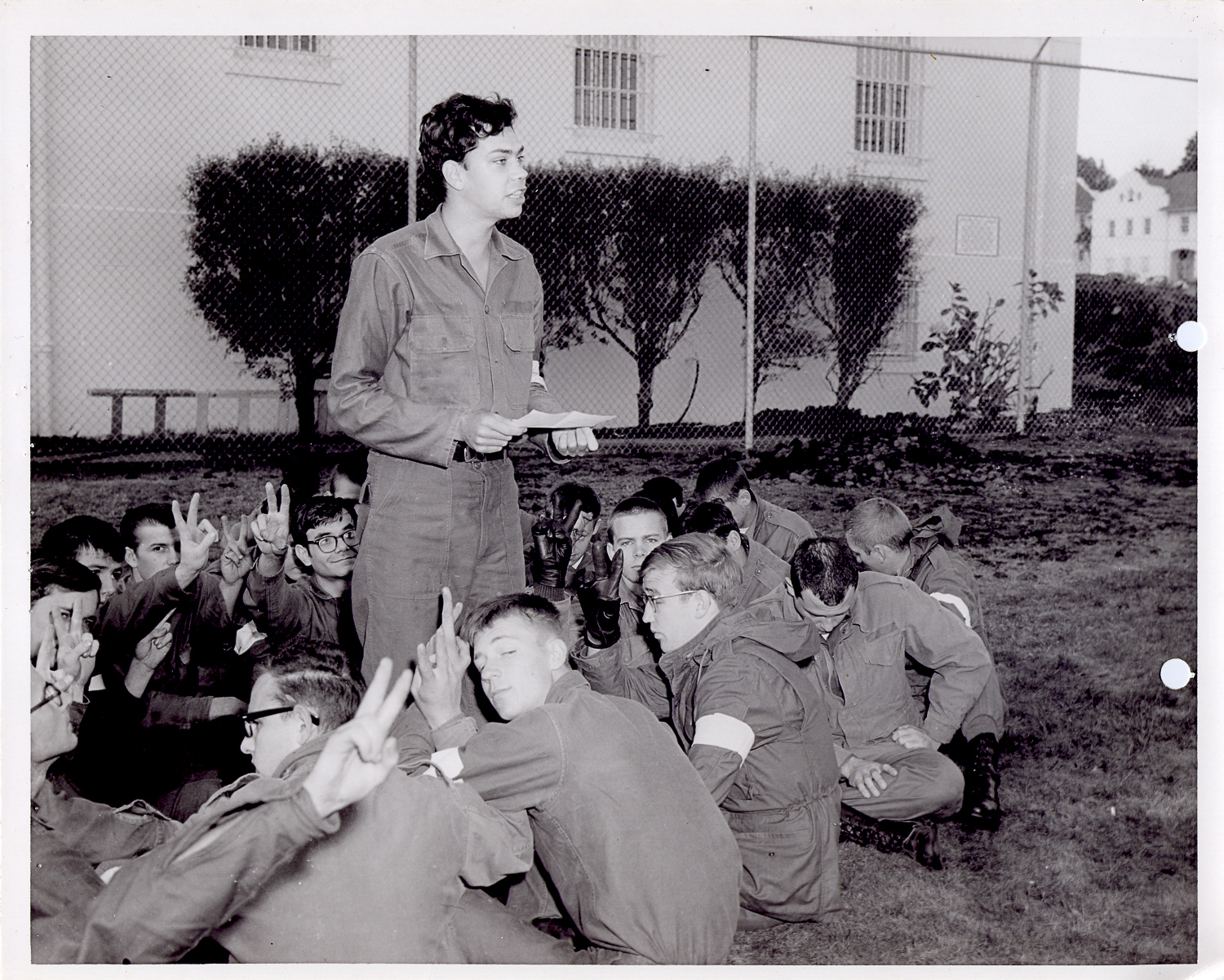
The Presidio 27 "mutiny" when 27 soldiers sat down to protest the murder of one of their own, mistreatment and the Vietnam War. Private Walter Pawlowski is reading their demands.

The protest against being drafted into the US army during the Vietnam War was a central element of the wider anti-war movement that gained momentum in the 1960s. Many young Americans, especially students, rejected the war as immoral and unnecessary. The draft was perceived as an unjust coercive measure that particularly affected disadvantaged groups. Many conscripts tried to escape the draft by fleeing to Canada, while others engaged in symbolic resistance by publicly burning their draft cards. There was also resistance within the army. In various cities, especially near military bases, so-called "G.I. Coffeehouses" were founded. These places offered soldiers a platform to exchange ideas, obtain information and talk about their experiences in the Vietnam War. They became centers of internal protest and organization. Soldiers serving in the Vietnam War increasingly voiced their dissatisfaction with the conditions and conduct of the war. Many soldiers reported a loss of faith in the legitimacy of the war, which led to an increase in desertions and refusal to carry out orders. Some units organized clandestine protests and voiced their opinions by forming peace and justice groups.

=== Fort Hood Three ===
The Fort Hood Three consisted of Private First Class James Johnson, Private David A. Samas, and Private Dennis Mora, who refused to go to the Vietnam War in 1966. They felt that the war was immoral and that they did not want to fight for a country that they felt was pursuing unjust practices. These soldiers, including future anti-war activist David Hawkins, were court-martialed and received harsh punishment, which brought their protest and opposition to the draft into the public eye.

=== Fort Lewis Six ===
The Fort Lewis Six was a group of six soldiers, Private First Class Manuel Perez, Private First Class Paul A. Forest, Specialist 4 Carl M. Dix Jr, Private James B. Allen, Private First Class Lawrence Galgano and Private First Class Jeffrey C. Griffith who refused to go to the Vietnam War, arguing that the war was unlawful. Their refusal led to disciplinary action and a court-martial.

=== Presidio 27 ===
The Presidio 27 was a group of 27 soldiers who took part in a sit-down protest at Presidio Army Base in California in 1971. They refused to go to the Vietnam War and demanded that the military leadership improve conditions for soldiers and end the war. This protest was one of the most visible forms of internal resistance, and the soldiers were court-martialed for their disobedience. The sit-down protest received nationwide attention and increased awareness of discontent within the army.
