= Robert John Hibbs =

- Army Medal of Honor
- Born: April 21, 1943; Omaha, Nebraska, US
- Died: March 5, 1966 (aged 22); Don Dien Lo Ke, Republic of Vietnam
- Burial place: Greenwood Cemetery, Cedar Falls, Iowa
- Military career
- Allegiance: United States of America
- Branch: United States Army
- Service years: 1964–1966
- Rank: Second Lieutenant
- Units: 28th Infantry Regiment, 1st Infantry Division
- Conflicts: Vietnam War †
- Awards: Medal of Honor; Purple Heart

Robert John Hibbs (April 21, 1943 – March 5, 1966) was a United States Army officer who graduated from the University of Northern Iowa and was a recipient of the United States military's highest decoration—the Medal of Honor—for his actions in the Vietnam War.

== Biography ==
Hibbs joined the Army from Des Moines, Iowa in August 1964, and by March 5, 1966, was serving as a second lieutenant in Company B, 2nd Battalion, 28th Infantry Regiment, 1st Infantry Division. He had earned his commission thru the US Army Officer Candidate School OCS, Fort Benning, Ga. On 5 March 1966 during Operation Cocoa Beach, at Don Dien Lo Ke in the Republic of Vietnam, his patrol spotted a Viet Cong force approaching the 2nd Battalion's position. Hibbs led his small group in an attack on the enemy force and, with another soldier, volunteered to rescue a wounded comrade. After reaching the wounded man, Hibbs stayed behind to provide covering fire and was mortally wounded while attacking an enemy machine gun emplacement. For his actions during the battle, he was posthumously awarded the Medal of Honor a year later on February 24, 1967.

Hibbs, aged 22 at his death, was buried in Greenwood Cemetery, Cedar Falls, Iowa.

2LT Hibbs was honored by having a section of the UNI campus renamed in his honor, and a flagpole and monument erected with his name on it, just east of the West Gym.

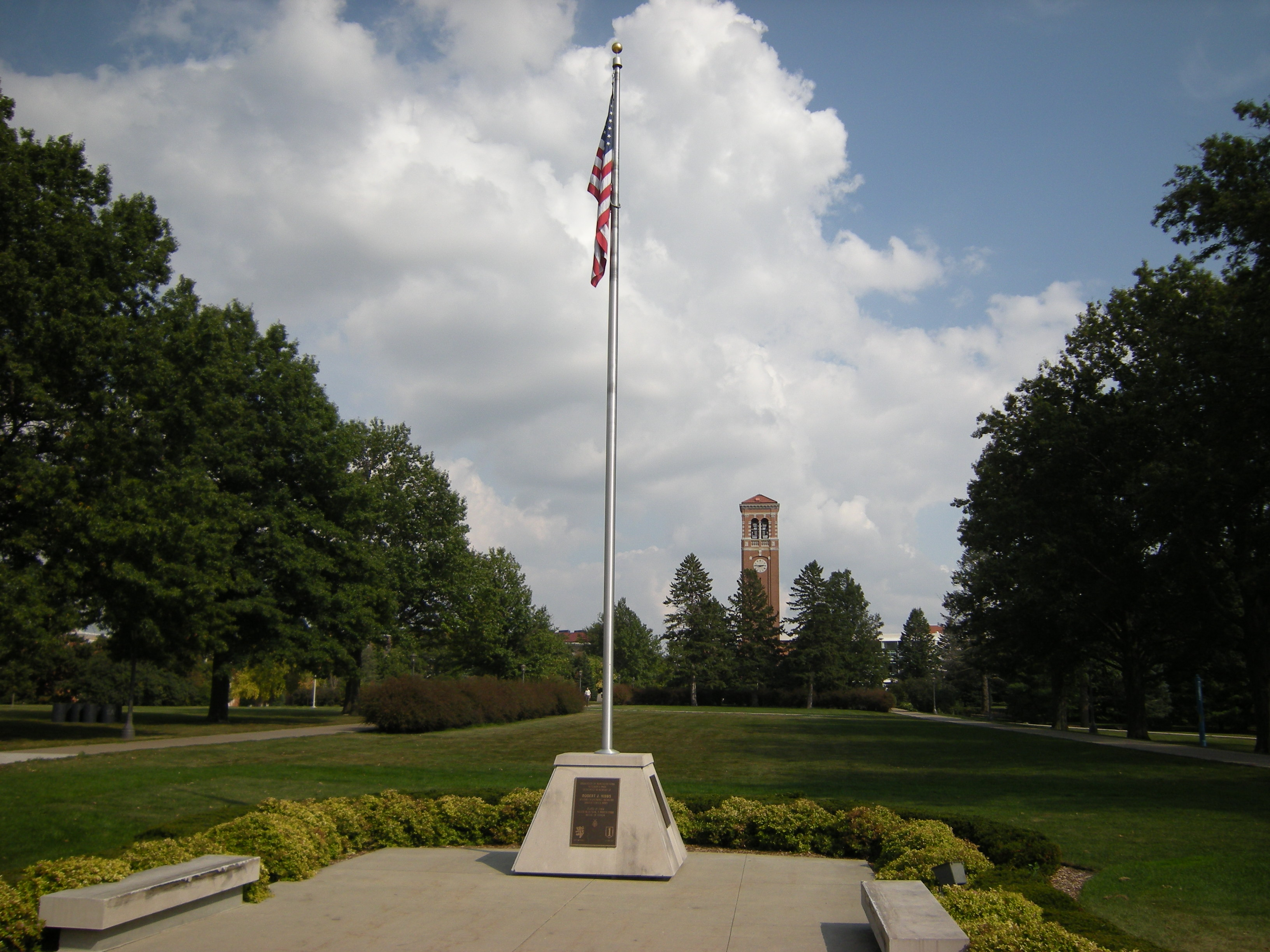
Hibbs flagpole

== Medal of Honor citation ==
Lieutenant Hibbs' official Medal of Honor citation reads:

For conspicuous gallantry and intrepidity at the risk of life above and beyond the call of duty. 2d Lt. Hibbs was in command of a 15-man ambush patrol of the 2d Battalion, when his unit observed a company of Viet Cong advancing along the road toward the 2d Battalion's position. Informing his command post by radio of the impending attack, he prepared his men for the oncoming Viet Cong, emplaced 2 mines in their path and, when the insurgents were within 20 feet of the patrol's position, he fired the 2 antipersonnel mines, wounding or killing half of the enemy company. Then, to cover the withdrawal of his patrol, he threw hand grenades, stepped onto the open road, and opened fire on the remainder of the Viet Cong force of approximately 50 men. Having rejoined his men, he was leading them toward the battalion perimeter when the patrol encountered the rear elements of another Viet Cong company deployed to attack the battalion. With the advantage of surprise, he directed a charge against the Viet Cong, which carried the patrol through the insurgent force, completely disrupting its attack. Learning that a wounded patrol member was wandering in the area between the 2 opposing forces and although moments from safety and wounded in the leg himself, he and a sergeant went back to the battlefield to recover the stricken man. After they maneuvered through the withering fire of 2 Viet Cong machine guns, the sergeant grabbed the dazed soldier and dragged him back toward the friendly lines while 2d Lt. Hibbs remained behind to provide covering fire. Armed with only an M16 rifle and a pistol, but determined to destroy the enemy positions, he then charged the 2 machine gun emplacements and was struck down. Before succumbing to his mortal wounds, he destroyed the starlight telescopic sight attached to his rifle to prevent its capture and use by the Viet Cong. 2d Lt. Hibb's profound concern for his fellow soldiers, and his intrepidity at the risk of his life above and beyond the call of duty are in the highest traditions of the U.S. Army and reflect great credit upon himself and the Armed Forces of his country.

== See also ==
- List of Medal of Honor recipients
- List of Medal of Honor recipients for the Vietnam War
- Memorial in his honor at UNI's West Gym
