= 1st Battalion, 28th Infantry Regiment =

United States Army combined arms battalion

1–28 Infantry Battalion
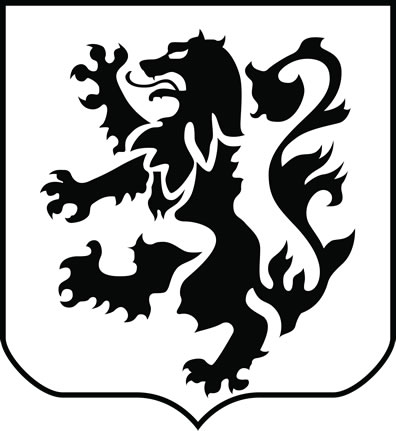
- Distinctive Unit Insignia
- Active: 1901–1933; 1940–1945; 1950–1983; 2005–2023
- Country: United States
- Branch: Regular Army
- Type: Infantry Battalion
- Role: Task Force
- Garrison/HQ: Fort Benning, GA
- Nicknames: Lions of Cantigny; Black Lions
- Mottos: Vincit amor patriae Latin; Love of the country conquers
- Colors: White and black
- Engagements: Philippine Insurrection; World War I World War II; Vietnam War; Iraq War; Afghanistan War

Commanders
- Current commander: LTC Daniel J. Pecha

The Task Force 1st Battalion, 28th Infantry Regiment (Task Force 1–28 IN), was a United States Infantry Battalion task force, located at Fort Benning in Georgia. It was under the direct command of the 3rd Infantry Division and existed as the only organic task force in the U.S. Army Forces Command. It had expanded subordinate units like a 105mm howitzer battery, an engineer company, an expanded support company, and additional staff for the battalion headquarters.

During the Vietnam War, the battalion was under the command of the 1st Infantry Division

The Task Force was activated on 15 December 2015 congruent with the inactivation of the 3rd Brigade Combat Team, 3rd Infantry Division. On 23 October 2020 the Task Force was converted to 1st Battalion, 28th Infantry Regiment. On 24 March 2023 the 1st Battalion, 28th Infantry Regiment was inactivated.
