= 28th Infantry Regiment (United States) =

- Coat of arms
- Active: 1901–1945; 1950–2023
- Country: United States
- Branch: United States Army
- Type: Infantry
- Garrison/HQ: 1st Battalion at Fort Benning, Georgia
- Nickname: "Lions of Cantigny" (special designation)
- Motto: Vincit amor patriae (Love of Country Conquers)
- Engagements: Philippine–American War World War I: Meuse-Argonne Offensive; World War II: Battle for Brest; Battle of Hürtgen Forest; Vietnam War: Battle of Ong Thanh; Iraq War War in Afghanistan

Commanders
- Honorary Commander: Brigadier General (Ret.) James E. Shelton
- Honorary CSM: Command Sergeant Major (Ret.) John Terry
- Notable commanders: Mott Hooton; Robert Lee Bullard; Beaumont B. Buck; Hanson Edward Ely; Clarence R. Huebner; Terry de la Mesa Allen Jr.

Insignia
- Distinctive unit insignia

Since the establishment of the United States Army in 1775, three regiments have held the designation 28th Infantry Regiment. The first was a provisional unit that was constituted on 29 January 1813 and served during The War of 1812. The second was a reorganization and redesignation of 2nd Battalion, 19th Infantry Regiment on 1 October 1866 for the American Indian Wars. This incarnation of the 28th Infantry Regiment lasted until 15 March 1869, when it was consolidated back into the 19th Infantry Regiment. The third version of the 28th Infantry Regiment was established in 1901, holds the permanent designation and history, and is the one this article is about.

== History ==
=== Philippine–American War ===
The regiment first saw combat service from December 1901 to January 1904 during the Philippine–American War where the regiment was heavily involved in counter-guerrilla operations. Upon returning to the U.S. the regiment relieved the 14th Infantry at Fort Snelling. During the years 1906–1908, the regiment, minus one battalion, performed guard and police duty as part of the United States Cuban Occupation force.

=== World War I ===
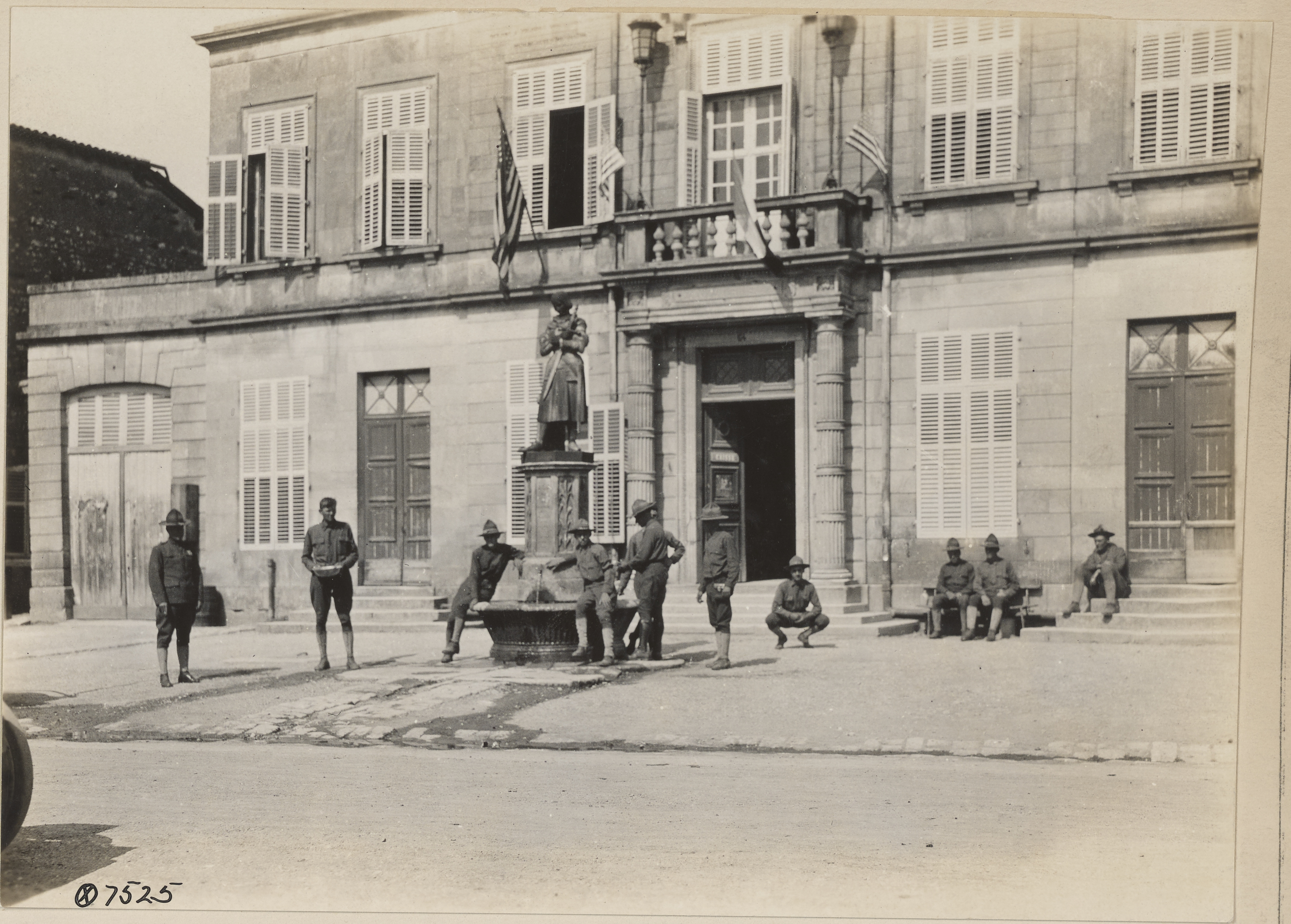
Members of the 28th Infantry Regiment around a statue of Joan of Arc, Tréveray, France. February 1918

In 1913, the 28th Infantry was ordered to Texas to assist in guarding the Mexican border against raids by Pancho Villa. Following the entry of the US into World War I, the regiment was assigned on 8 June 1917 to the First Expeditionary Division which later became the 1st Division. On 29 June 1917, the men of Company K became the first American combat unit to set foot on European soil at Saint-Nazaire, France. During the Battle of Cantigny, the 28th attacked the Germans and earned the moniker "The Lions of Cantigny."

=== Interwar period ===
The regiment arrived at the port of New York on 30 August 1919 aboard the USS Orizaba. It participated in the 1st Division Victory Parades in New York City and Washington, D.C., on 10 and 17 September 1919, respectively. It was transferred on 4 October 1919 to Camp Zachary Taylor, Kentucky, and to Camp Dix, New Jersey, on 12 September 1920. On 21 June 1922, the 3rd Battalion transferred to Fort Ontario, New York. On 26 June 1922, the 1st Battalion transferred to Fort Porter, New York. On 27 June 1922, the regimental headquarters and the 2nd Battalion transferred to Fort Niagara, New York. On 1 October 1926, the 1st Battalion transferred to Madison Barracks, New York. Company D was awarded the Edwin Howard Clark machine gun trophy in 1927 and 1937. The 1st Battalion transferred on 15 October 1931 to Fort Hayes, Ohio, and was inactivated on 30 September 1933 with the personnel and equipment used to reactivate the 1st Battalion, 10th Infantry Regiment. In January 1934, the regiment assumed command and control of portions of the 4th CCC District (Northern New York state), Second Corps Area. When the 1st Division was converted to a "triangular" division in 1939, the regiment was relieved from the division on 16 October 1939 and attached to the Second Corps Area for command and control. It was assigned to the reactivated 8th Division on 22 June 1940. The 1st Battalion was activated at Fort Niagara on 10 October 1940 and transferred to Fort Jackson, South Carolina, shortly thereafter. The remainder of the regiment transferred on 2 December 1940 to Fort Jackson.

=== World War II ===
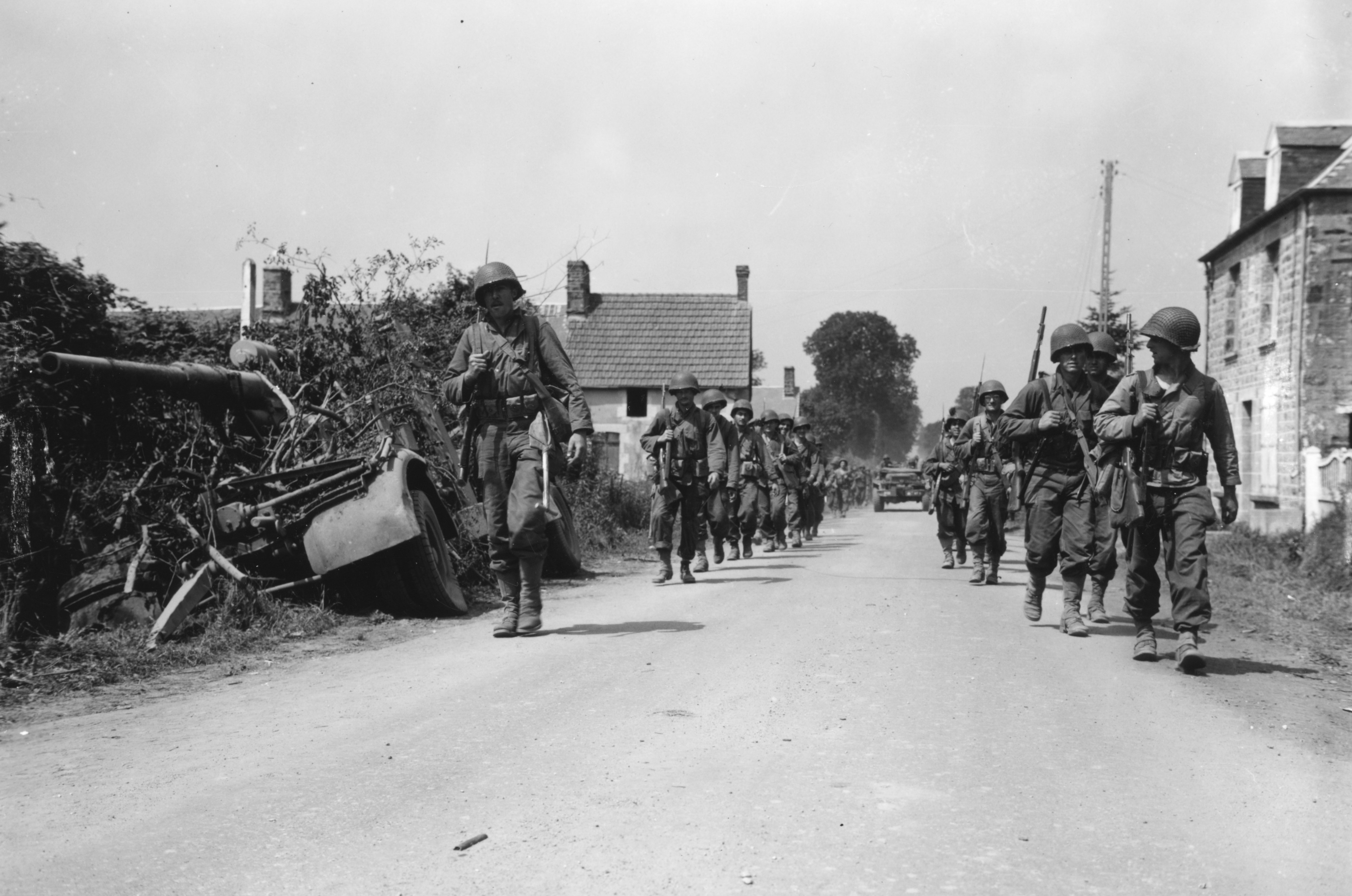
28th infantry regiment soldiers march on their way to the frontlines near Avranches, France. 31 July, 1944

The 28th Infantry again distinguished itself in combat during World War II as part of the 8th Infantry Division. After landing on Utah Beach on 4 July 1944, its first action was an attack to the south to establish a critical bridgehead over the Ay River so that armored divisions could launch a breakout and then attack into Brittany and Northern France. During its ten months of combat, the regiment played a major part in four allied campaigns – winning three Presidential Unit Citations embroidered Normandy, Bergstein and Stockheim. It captured over 115,000 prisoners and vast stores of enemy material.

=== Cold War ===
In 1963, Operation Long Thrust VI deployed 1st Battle Group, 28th Infantry from Fort Riley, Kansas to West Germany, where it proceeded through Communist East Germany to Berlin, "front line of the Cold War." 1st Battle Group Black Lions were present during President Kennedy's memorable "Ich bin ein Berliner" visit and returned to Fort Riley later that year.

=== Vietnam War ===
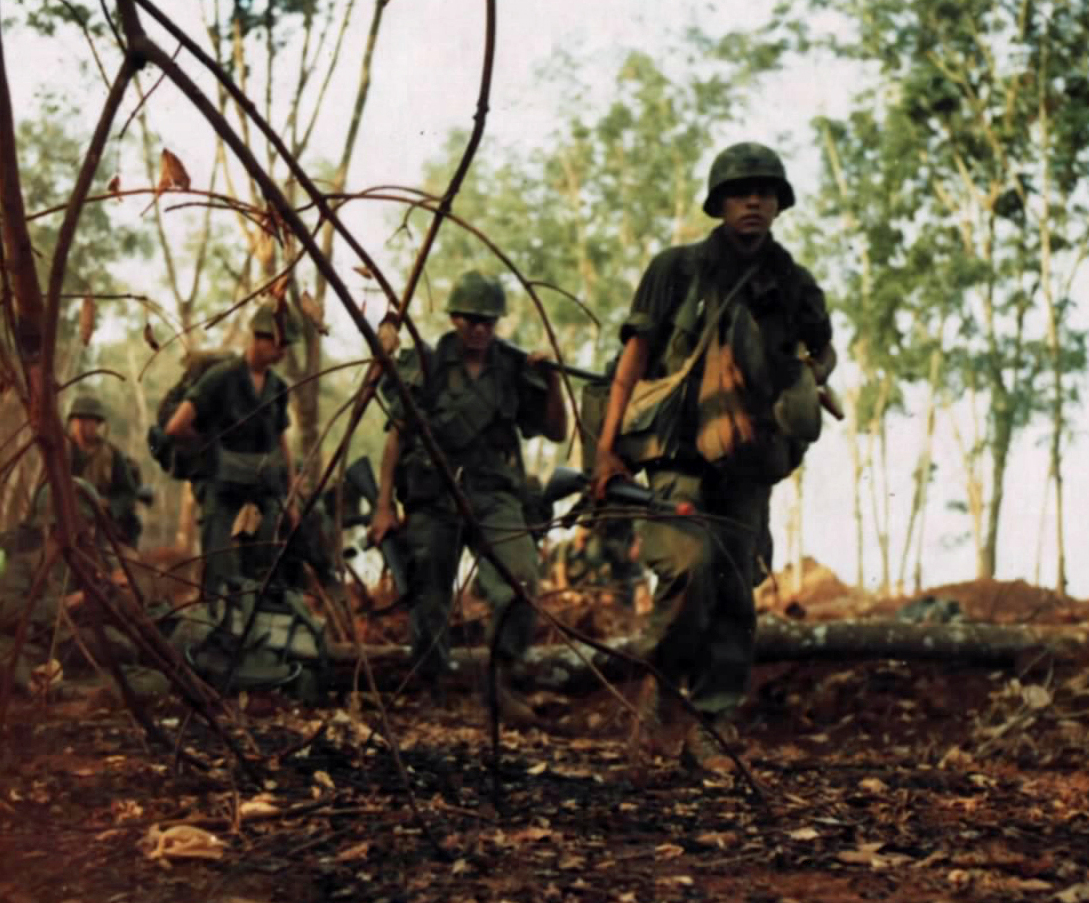
Company B, 2nd Battalion, 28th Infantry patrols a rubber plantation near Loc Ninh

In 1965, the 1st and 2nd Battalions were deployed to South Vietnam with the 1st Infantry Division. The 2nd Battalion was badly mauled during the Battle of Ong Thanh in October 1967. Early 1970 saw the end of the participation of the 1st and 2nd Battalions of the 28th Infantry in this war. After almost 5 years of combat in South Vietnam, the colors of both battalions were re-deployed to Fort Riley. Two members of the 1st Battalion, First Lieutenant Gary L. Miller of Company A and Captain Euripides Rubio of Headquarters and Headquarters Company (HHC) were awarded the Medal of Honor, both posthumously, for their heroism. On 5 March 1966, 2LT Robert John Hibbs, of Company B, 2nd Battalion was awarded posthumously the Medal of Honor. 2LT Hibbs was the first member of The First Infantry Division to receive the Medal of Honor for actions in the Republic of Vietnam.

=== War on terror ===
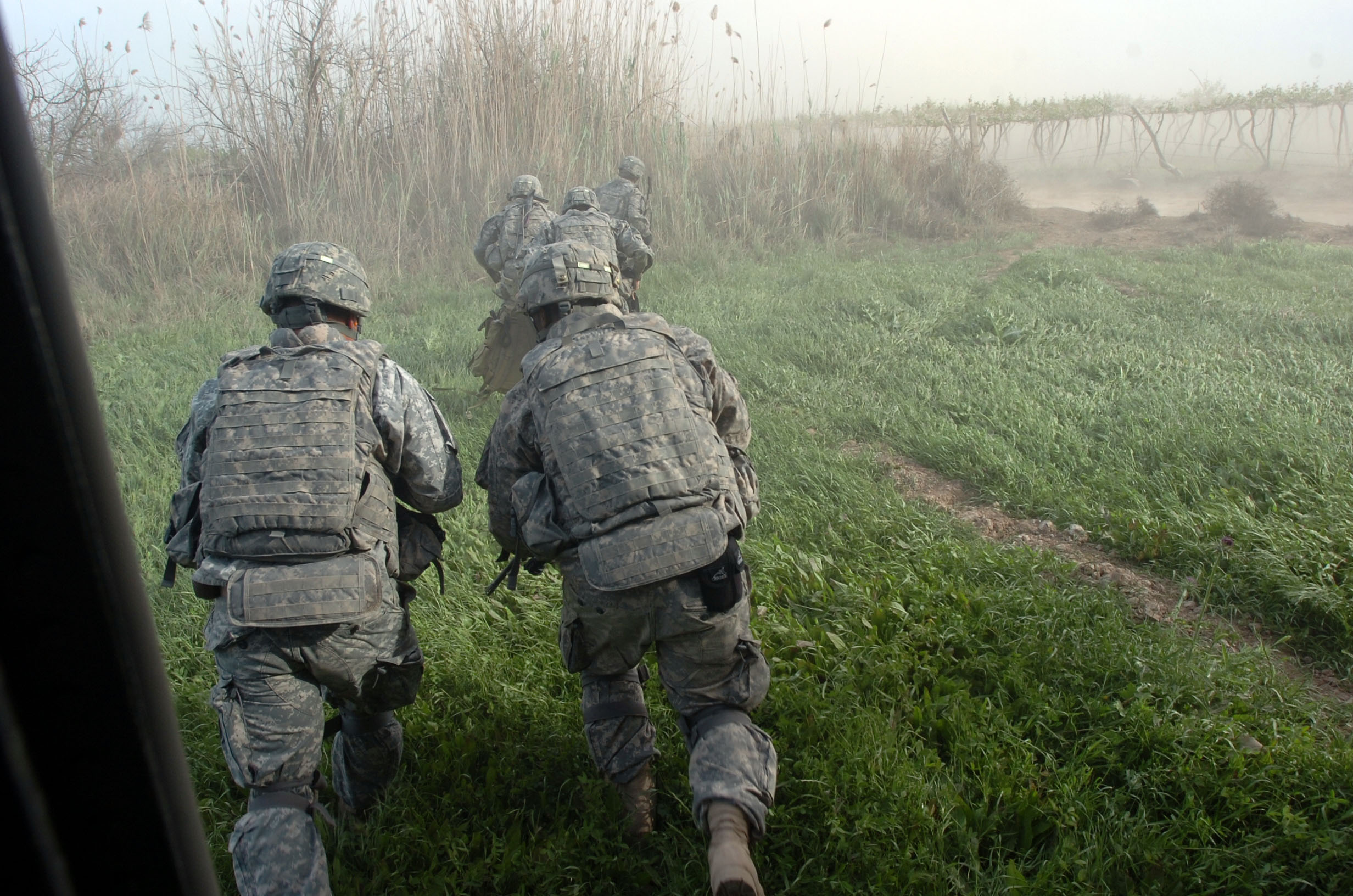
A squad of infantryman with 1st Battalion, 28th Infantry Regiment are inserted into a landing zone by a Black Hawk helicopter near Contingency Operating Base Speicher, Iraq.

1st Battalion deployed to Baghdad, Iraq, in February 2007 in support of the surge. During their service in the Rashid district of Baghdad, Shia/Sunni violence in the area ceased. The cessation of violence in Baghdad led to the "reconciliation" that would help to ensure peace in the capital. 1st Battalion returned to Ft Riley, Kansas, in April 2008. 1/28 would return to Iraq in September 2009 to August 2010. This time in Balad and Samarra.

2nd Battalion deployed in support of Operation Enduring Freedom XI–XII in May 2011, to the Paktika Province of Afghanistan. They were relieved by 1st Battalion in May 2012, marking the first time since Vietnam the two battalions fought together. 1st Battalion oversaw the transition from US forces to Afghan forces leading operations against insurgent operations. 1st Battalion redeployed to Fort Riley, KS in February 2013.

== Lineage ==
- 28th Infantry Regiment was constituted in the Regular Army on 2 February 1901 as an expansion unit for service in the Philippines as follows:

1st Battalion constituted in the Regular Army as Company A, 28th Infantry Regiment.
2nd Battalion constituted in the Regular Army as Company B, 28th Infantry Regiment.

- 28th Infantry Regiment organized at Vancouver Barracks, Washington as follows:

1st Battalion organized 10 June 1901.
2nd Battalion organized 17 June 1901.

- Regiment assigned 8 June 1917 to the 1st Expeditionary Division, which was later redesignated as the 1st Infantry Division.
- 1st Battalion inactivated 30 September 1933 at Fort Hayes, Ohio.
- Regiment relieved from assignment to the 1st Infantry Division 16 October 1939.
- Regiment assigned 22 June 1940 to the 8th Infantry Division.
- 1st Battalion activated 10 October 1940 at Fort Niagara, New York.
- Regiment moved on 2 December 1940 to Fort Jackson, South Carolina.
- Regiment reorganized on 9 April 1942 as 28th Infantry Regiment (Motorized).
- Regiment participated in the September–November 1942 Tennessee Maneuvers.
- Regiment transferred to Fort Leonard Wood, Missouri, on 28 November 1942
- Regiment staged at Camp Young, California for Deployment from San Francisco Port of Embarkation 20 March 1943, where the unit was stripped of its motorized assets, and redesignated as the 28th Infantry Regiment.
- Regiment's deployment assignment was changed to the European Theater on 1 May 1943.
- Regiment moved from Camp Young to Camp Forrest, Tennessee on 17 August 1943, where it retrained for European service.
- Regiment staged at Camp Kilmer on 23 November 1943.
- 28th Infantry Regiment deployed from New York Port of Embarkation on 5 December 1943
- Arrived in England on 16 December 1943.
- Deployed forward to France on 3 July 1944.
- Regiment attached to 6th Armored Division from 18 August 1944.
- Regiment released from attachment to 6th Armored Division on 21 August 1944.
- Regiment crossed into Luxembourg on 30 September 1944.
- Regiment entered Germany on 19 November 1944.
- Regiment was redeployed to Hampton Roads Port of Embarkation 6 July 1945 en route to assignment to the Pacific Theater.
- Regiment moved to Fort Leonard Wood, Missouri to begin training for invasion of Japanese Home Islands on 9 July 1945.
- Regiment was located at Fort Leonard Wood on 14 August 1945, which is when Japan agreed to surrender.
- Regiment inactivated 1 November 1945 at Fort Leonard Wood, Missouri.
- Regiment activated 17 August 1950 at Fort Jackson, South Carolina
- Regiment reorganized and redesignated 1 August 1957 as follows:

HHC, 1st Battalion became Headquarters and Headquarters Company, 1st Battle Group, 28th Infantry, and remained assigned to the 8th Infantry Division (organic elements concurrently constituted and activated)
HHC, 2nd Battalion became Headquarters and Headquarters Company, 2d Battle Group, 28th Infantry, relieved from assignment to the 8th Infantry Division, and assigned to the 1st Infantry Division (organic elements concurrently constituted and activated)

- HHC, 2nd Battle Group relieved 26 December 1958 from assignment to the 1st Infantry Division and assigned to the 24th Infantry Division
- HHC, 1st Battle Group relieved 1 May 1959 from assignment to the 8th Infantry Division and assigned to the 1st Infantry Division
- HHC, 2nd Battle Group inactivated 1 February 1963 in Germany and relieved from assignment to the 24th Infantry Division
- HHC, 2nd Battle Group redesignated 23 October 1963 as the HHC, 2nd Battalion, 28th Infantry, and assigned to the 1st Infantry Division.
- On 13 January 1964, the regiment was affected at Fort Riley as follows:

HHC, 1st Battle Group reorganized and redesignated as the 1st Battalion, 28th Infantry Regiment.
HHC, 2nd Battalion was activated.

- The regiment arrived in Vietnam as follows:

2nd Battalion: 2 October 1965
1st Battalion: 10 October 1965

- Regiment returned from Vietnam on 8 April 1970.
- 2nd Battalion inactivated 15 April 1970 at Fort Riley, Kansas, and relieved from assignment to the 1st Infantry Division
- 2nd Battalion assigned 21 February 1973 to the 8th Infantry Division
- 2nd Battalion activated 31 August 1973 in Germany.
- HHC, 1st Battalion inactivated 28 February 1983 at Fort Riley, Kansas, and relieved from assignment to the 1st Infantry Division
- 2nd Battalion inactivated 1 August 1984 in Germany and relieved from assignment to the 8th Infantry Division
- Regimental and battalion headquarters reassigned 27 February 1987 to the United States Army Training and Doctrine Command and activated at Fort Jackson, South Carolina.
- HHC, 2nd Battalion inactivated 30 September 1994 at Fort Jackson, South Carolina
- HHC, 2nd Battalion activated 16 September 1996 at Fort Jackson, South Carolina
- Regiment redesignated 1 October 2005 as follows:

HHC, 1st Battalion, 28th Infantry Regiment became Headquarters, 1st Battalion, 28th Infantry Regiment
HHC, 2nd Battalion, 28th Infantry Regiment became Headquarters, 2nd Battalion, 28th Infantry Regiment.

- Regimental Hqs. and Battalion Hqs. inactivated 16 November 2005 at Fort Jackson, South Carolina, and withdrawn from the United States Army Training and Doctrine Command.
- 1st Battalion assigned 16 January 2006 to the 4th Brigade Combat Team, 1st Infantry Division, and activated at Fort Riley, Kansas.
- 2nd Battalion activated 16 March 2008 in Grafenwoehr, Germany.
- 2nd Battalion inactivated 31 May 2013 in Grafenwoehr, Germany.
- 1st Battalion inactivated 9 April 2015 at Fort Riley, Kansas.
- 1st Battalion activated 16 December 2015 at Fort Benning, Georgia, as Task Force 1-28.
- The Task Force was converted on 23 October 2020 to 1st Battalion, 28th Infantry Regiment.
- 1st Battalion inactivated 24 March 2023 at Fort Benning, Georgia.

== Honors ==
=== Campaign participation credit ===
- Philippine Insurrection:
1. Mindanao
- World War I:
1. Montdidier-Noyon;
2. Aisne-Marne;
3. St. Mihiel;
4. Meuse-Argonne;
5. Lorraine 1917;
6. Lorraine 1918;
7. Picardy 1918
- World War II:
1. Normandy;
2. Northern France;
3. Rhineland;
4. Central Europe
- Vietnam War:
1. Defense;
2. Counteroffensive;
3. Counteroffensive, Phase II;
4. Counteroffensive, Phase III;
5. Tet Counteroffensive;
6. Counteroffensive, Phase IV;
7. Counteroffensive, Phase V;
8. Counteroffensive, Phase VI;
9. Tet 69/Counteroffensive;
10. Summer-Fall 1969;
11. Winter-Spring 1970
- Global war on terrorism
1. February 2007 – April 2008 Baghdad Iraq
2. September 2009 – August 2010 Balad Iraq
3. May 2012 – present Paktika Province, Afghanistan

=== Decorations ===
- Presidential Unit Citation (Army)
1. Presidential Unit Citation (Army) for NORMANDY
2. Presidential Unit Citation (Army) for BERGSTEIN
3. Presidential Unit Citation (Army) for STOCKHEIM
4. Presidential Unit Citation (Army) for TAY NINH PROVINCE (1st Battalion Only)
- Valorous Unit Award
1. Valorous Unit Award for LO KE RUBBER PLANTATION (2nd Battalion Only)
2. Valorous Unit Award for BAGHDAD 2007-2008 (1st Battalion, Less Company C Only)
3. Valorous Unit Award for BAGHDAD MAR-NOV 2007 (1st Battalion, Company C Only)
4. Valorous Unit Award for AFGHANISTAN 2011-2012 (2nd Battalion only)
- Meritorious Unit Commendation
1. Meritorious Unit Commendation for Operation Iraqi Freedom (1st Battalion only)
2. Meritorious Unit Commendation for IRAQ 2008-2009 (2nd Battalion only)
3. Meritorious Unit Commendation for IRAQ OCT 2008-SEP 2009 (2nd Battalion, Company A only)
4. Meritorious Unit Commendation for AFGHANISTAN 2012-2013 (1st Battalion Only)
- French Croix de Guerre
1. French Croix de Guerre with Palm, World War I for Picardy
2. French Croix de Guerre with Palm, World War I for Aisne-Marne
3. French Croix de Guerre, World War I, Fourragere
- Luxembourg Croix de Guerre for Luxembourg
- Republic of Vietnam Cross of Gallantry
1. Republic of Vietnam Cross of Gallantry with Palm for Vietnam 1965–1968
2. Republic of Vietnam Cross of Gallantry with Palm for Vietnam 1969–1970
- Republic of Vietnam Civil Action Honor Medal, First Class for Vietnam 1965–1970

== Medal of Honor recipients ==
- Second Lieutenant Samuel I. Parker. World War I. From 18 to 19 July 1918, while assigned to Company K, 28th Infantry Regiment, near Soissons, France, he ordered his depleted platoon and a disorganized group of French Colonials to follow him in an attack upon a strong point. This consolidated group followed 2d Lt. Parker through direct enemy rifle and machine gun fire to the crest of the hill, and rushing forward, took a quarry by storm, capturing 6 machine guns and about 40 prisoners. The next day when the assault was continued, 2d Lt. Parker in command of the merged 2d and 3d Battalions was in support of the 1st Battalion. Although painfully wounded in the foot, he refused to be evacuated and continued to lead his command until the objective was reached. Seeing that the assault battalion was subjected to heavy enfilade fire due to a gap between it and the French on its left, 2d Lt. Parker led his battalion through this heavy fire up on the line to the left of the 1st Battalion and thereby closed the gap, remaining in command of his battalion until the newly established lines of the 28th Infantry were thoroughly consolidated. In supervising the consolidation of the new position, 2d Lt. Parker was compelled to crawl about on his hands and knees on account of his painful wound. His conspicuous gallantry and spirit of self-sacrifice were a source of great inspiration to the members of the entire command.
- Private Sterling L. Morelock. World War I. On 4 October 1918, while serving with Company M, 28th Infantry Regiment near Exermont, France, he, with 3 other men who were acting as runners at company headquarters, voluntarily led them as a patrol in advance of his company's frontline through an intense rifle, artillery, and machine gun fire and penetrated the woods which formed the German frontline. Encountering a series of 5 hostile machine gun nests, containing from 1 to 5 machine guns each, with his patrol he cleaned them all out, gained and held complete mastery of the situation until the arrival of his company commander with reinforcements, even though his entire party had become casualties. He rendered first aid to the injured and evacuated them by using stretcher bearers 10 German prisoners whom he had captured. Soon thereafter his company commander was wounded and while dressing his wound Pvt. Morelock was very severely wounded in the hip, which forced his evacuation. His heroic action and devotion to duty were an inspiration to the entire regiment.
- Sergeant Michael B. Ellis. World War I. On 5 October 1918, while serving with Company C, 28th Infantry Regiment near Exermont, France, he operated far in advance of the first wave of his company, voluntarily undertaking most dangerous missions and single-handedly attacking and reducing machine gun nests. Flanking one emplacement, he killed 2 of the enemy with rifle fire and captured 17 others. Later he single-handedly advanced under heavy fire and captured 27 prisoners who had been holding up the advance of the company. The captured officers indicated the locations of four other machine guns, and he in turn captured these, together with their crews, at all times showing marked heroism and fearlessness.
- Second Lieutenant Robert J. Hibbs. Vietnam War. On 6 March 1966, near Don Dien Lo Ke, Republic of Vietnam, while assigned to Company B, 2d Battalion, 28th Infantry Regiment, 2d Lt. Hibbs was in command of a 15-man ambush patrol of the 2d Battalion, when his unit observed a company of Viet Cong advancing along the road toward the 2d battalion's position. He fired two anti-personnel mines, wounding or killing half of the enemy company. Then, to cover the withdrawal of his patrol, he threw hand grenades, stepped onto the open road, and opened fire on the remainder of the Viet Cong force of approximately 50 men. Having rejoined his men, he was leading them toward the battalion perimeter when the patrol encountered the rear elements of another Viet Cong company deployed to attack the battalion. With the advantage of surprise, he directed the charge against the Viet Cong, which carried the patrol through the insurgent force, completely disrupting its attack. Learning that a wounded patrol member was wandering in the area between the two opposing forces and although moments from safety and wounded in the leg himself, he and a sergeant went back to the battlefield to recover the stricken man. After they maneuvered through the withering fire of two Viet Cong machine guns, the sergeant grabbed the dazed soldier and dragged him back toward friendly lines while 2d Lt. Hibbs remained behind to provide covering fire. Armed with only a M-16 rifle and a pistol, but determined to destroy the enemy positions, he then charged the two machine gun emplacements and was struck down. Before succumbing to his mortal wounds, he destroyed the starlight scope attached to his rifle to prevent its capture and use by the Viet Cong.
- Captain Eurípides Rubio. Vietnam War. On 8 November 1966, while serving with Headquarters & Headquarters Company (HHC), 1st Battalion, 28th Infantry Regiment, 1st Infantry Division, in the Tay Ninh Province, Republic of Vietnam, Captain Rubio's company came under attack from the North Vietnamese Army; leaving the safety of his post, Rubio received two serious wounds as he braved the intense enemy fire to distribute ammunition, re-establish positions and render aid to the wounded. Despite his pain, he assumed command when a rifle company commander was medically evacuated. He was then wounded a third time as he tried to move amongst his men to encourage them to fight with renewed effort. While aiding the evacuation of wounded personnel, he noted that a U.S. smoke grenade, which was intended to mark the Viet Cong's position for an air strike, had fallen dangerously close to friendly lines. He ran to move the grenade, but was immediately struck to his knees by enemy fire. Despite his wounds, Rubio managed to collect the grenade and run through enemy fire to within 20 meters of the enemy position and throw the by-then already smoking grenade into the enemy before he fell for the final time. Using the repositioned grenade as a marker, friendly air strikes were directed to destroy the hostile positions.
- Command Sergeant Major Terry P. Richardson. Vietnam War. On 14 September 1968, while assigned to Company A, 1st Battalion, 28th Infantry, 1st Infantry Division, in Lộc Ninh, Republic of Vietnam, Richardson's unit was engaged by intense automatic weapons and small-arms fire from a well-entrenched North Vietnamese Army battalion. Richardson maneuvered through a hail of hostile rounds and deployed his men into defensive positions while directing their suppressive fire. During the attack, he dragged three wounded soldiers back to safety. With his platoon surrounded, he realized the only way they would avoid being overrun was with accurate tactical air strikes. Richardson made his way up Hill 222 undetected to call in tactical air strikes from a shallow irrigation ditch with only rubber trees for cover. Once up the hill, he realized that the enemy force was a large regimental base complex of the 7th North Vietnamese Army Division. Speaking directly to the pilots, Richardson began calling in the airstrikes. An hour in, he was shot in the right leg by a North Vietnamese Army sniper. Richardson continued guiding the pilots for seven more hours, calling in approximately 32 airstrikes until the enemy retreated. His actions saved 85 lives.
- First Lieutenant Gary L. Miller. Vietnam War. On 16 February 1969, while assigned to Company A, 1st Battalion, 28th Infantry Regiment, 1st Infantry Division, in Binh Duong Province, Republic of Vietnam, Miller smothered the blast of an enemy-thrown grenade with his body, sacrificing his life to protect those around him.
