= Camp Thunderbolt =

Former South Korean army base in Vietnam

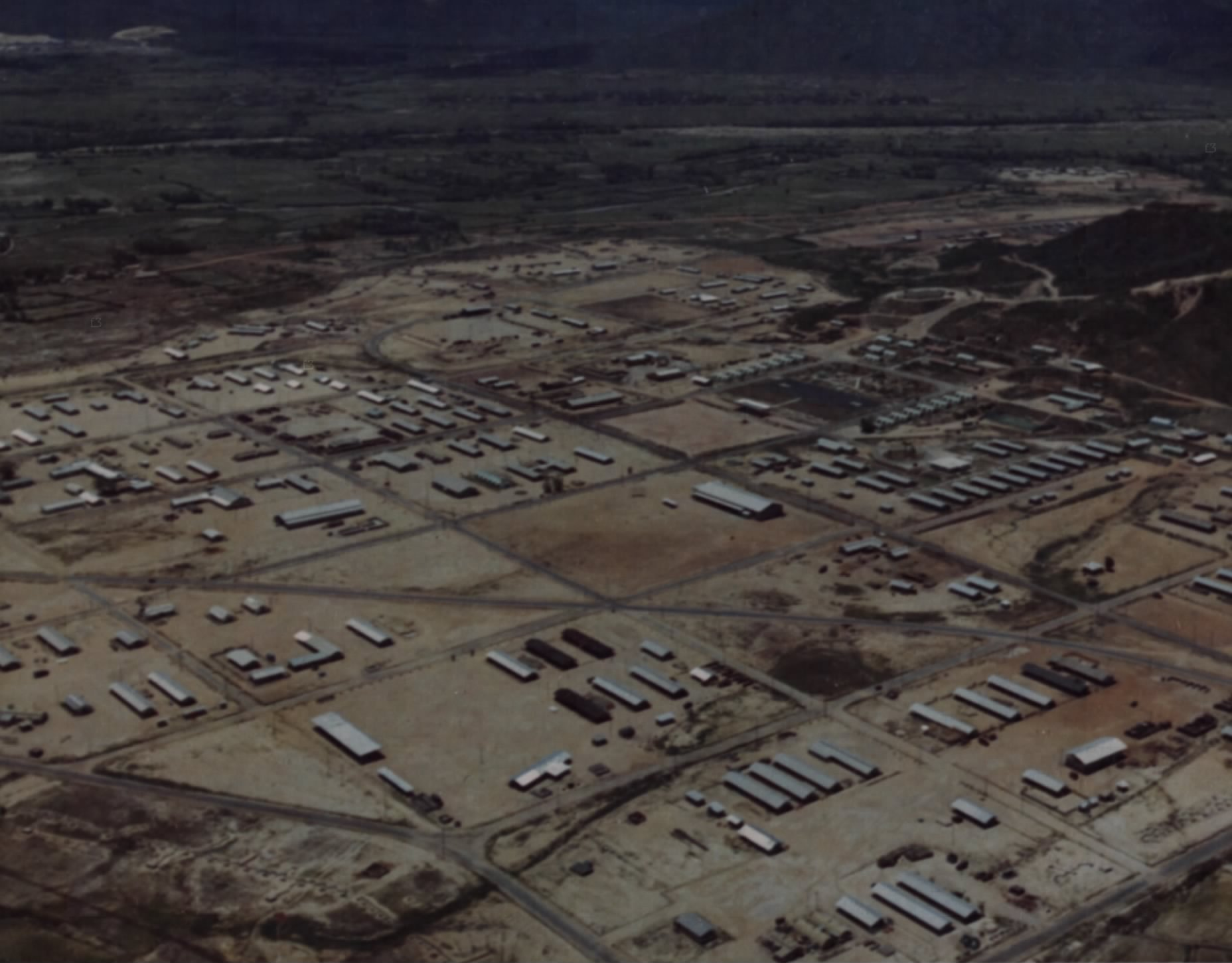
- Camp Thunderbolt, August 1968

Location
- Coordinates: 13.76°N 109.10°E

Site history
- Built: 1965
- In use: 1965-present
- Battles/wars: Vietnam War

Garrison information
- Occupants: Capital Division

ROK Strip Airfield
- IATA: none; ICAO: none

Summary
- Elevation AMSL: 60 ft (18 m)

Runways
Direction	Length		Surface
Direction	ft	m	Surface
	3,000	914	PSP

Camp Thunderbolt (also known as ROK Strip Airfield or ROK Valley) is a former Republic of Korea Army (ROKA) base west of Qui Nhơn in Bình Định Province, Vietnam.

== History ==
The base was originally established in late 1965 by the 70th Engineer Battalion approximately 14 km west of Qui Nhơn, 5 km south of Lane Army Airfield and southwest of the Highway 19 and Highway 1 intersection. Further improvements to the base were made by the 19th Engineer Battalion.

The Camp served as the base for the Capital Mechanized Infantry Division (also known as the Tiger Division) from their arrival in Vietnam in September 1965 until their departure in March 1973.

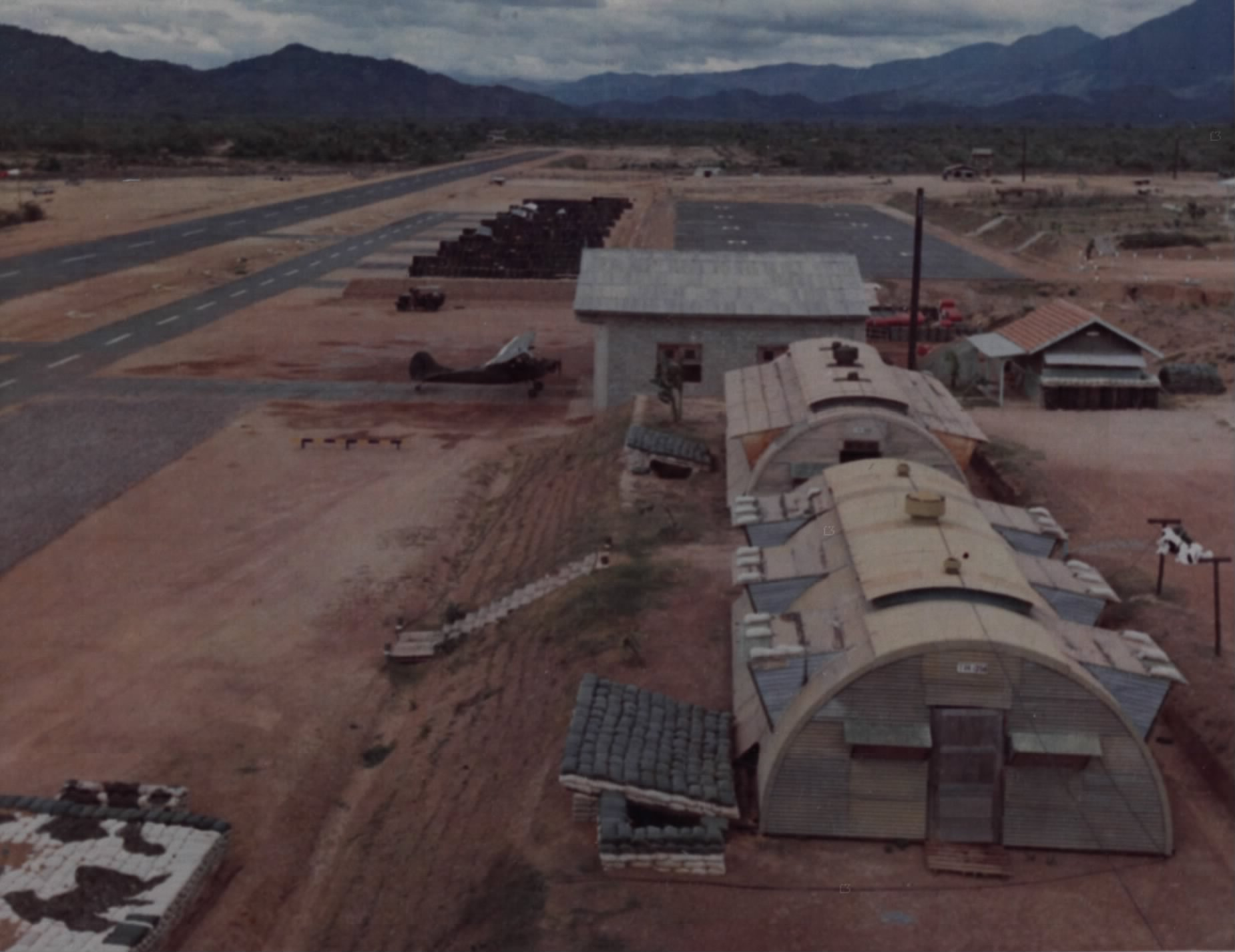
ROK Strip Airfield, 3 September 1968

On 5 March 1971 CH-47C #67-18518 of the 180th Assault Support Helicopter Company on approach to Lane Army Airfield collided with a ROKA O-1D causing both aircraft to crash killing 5 passengers and crew on the CH-47 and the pilot of the O-1.

== Current use ==
The base appears to remain in use by the People's Army of Vietnam.
