= Robert M. Patterson =

Robert M. Patterson could refer to:

- Robert Maskell Patterson (1787–1854), American mathematician and director of the U.S. Mint
- Robert Martin Patterson (born 1948), U.S. Army soldier and recipient of the Congressional Medal of Honor
