= Song Mao Base Camp =

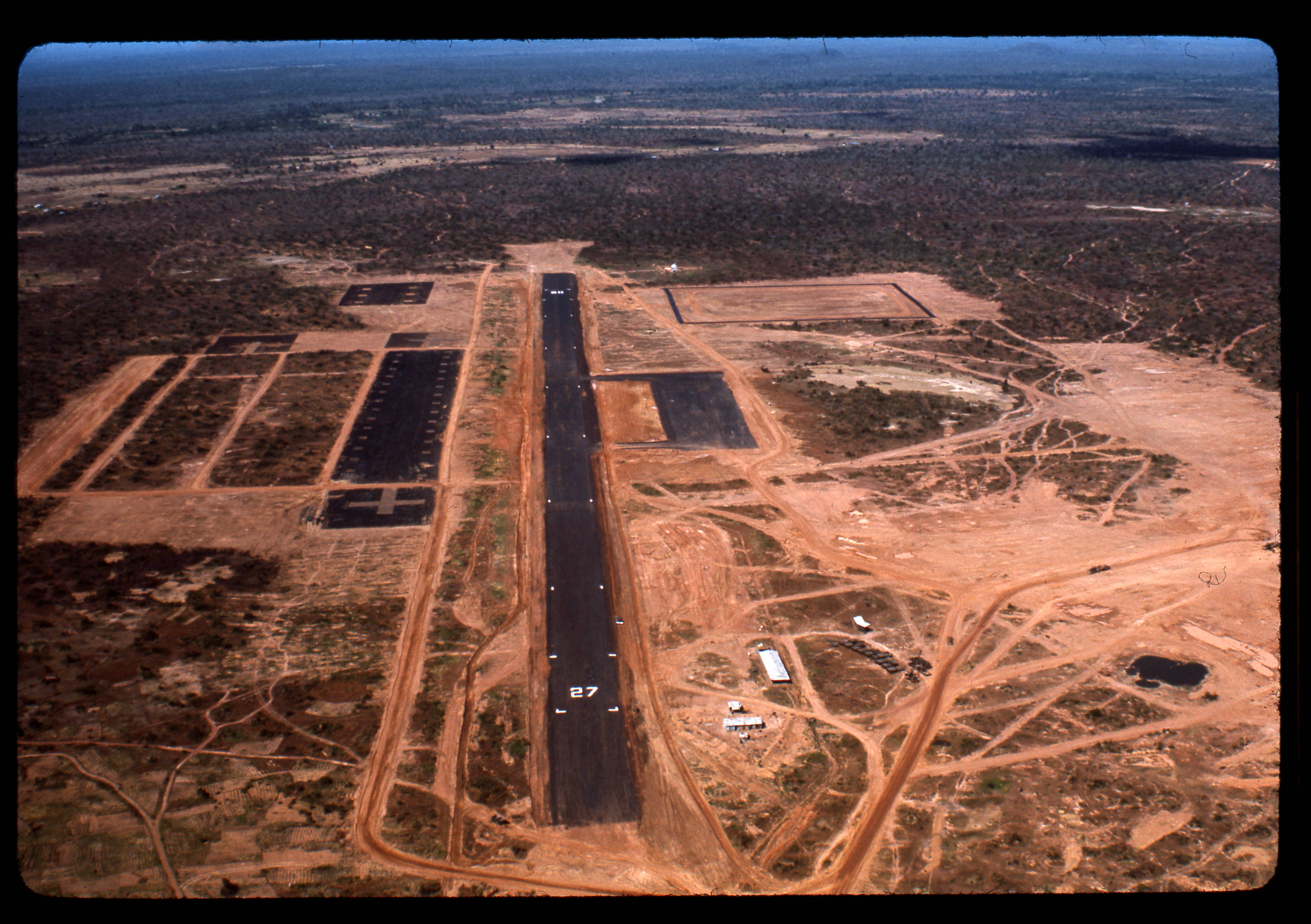
- Song Mao, 31 January 1967

Site information
- Type: Army
- Condition: abandoned

Location
- Coordinates: 11.26°N 108.491°E

Site history
- Built: 1962
- In use: 1962-1975
- Battles/wars: Vietnam War

Song Mao Airfield
- IATA: none; ICAO: none

Summary
- Elevation AMSL: 85 ft (26 m)

Runways
Direction	Length		Surface
Direction	ft	m	Surface
	3,500	1,067	PSP

Song Mao Base Camp (also known as Firebase Song Mao) was a U.S. Army and Army of the Republic of Vietnam (ARVN) base northeast of Phan Thiết in southeast Vietnam.

== History ==
Song Mao was located north of Route 1 approximately 56 km northeast of Phan Thiết and 67 km southwest of Phan Rang. Special Forces Detachment A-113 was based here from October 1963.

The 3rd Battalion, 506th Infantry was based here in early December 1967 for Operation Klamath Falls and returned here again in May 1968. On 8 December 1968 a patrol of the 7th Squadron, 17th Cavalry was ambushed near Song Mao. SGT Ray McKibben would be posthumously awarded the Medal of Honor for his actions.

The 2nd Squadron, 1st Cavalry was based here from June 1969 until May 1970. The 3rd Battalion, 503rd Infantry was based here from July–August 1969 On 1 April 1970 three People's Army of Vietnam Battalions attacked the base which was occupied by the 2nd Squadron, 1st Cavalry and the 44th ARVN Regiment, the attack was repulsed resulting in two U.S., two ARVN and 151 PAVN killed.

== Current use ==
The base has been turned over to housing and farmland. The airfield is still clearly visible on satellite images.
