= Ray McKibben =

- Army Medal of Honor
- Born: October 27, 1945; Felton, Georgia, U.S.
- Died: December 8, 1968 near Song Mao, Republic of Vietnam
- Burial place: Center Baptist Church, Felton, Georgia
- Military career
- Allegiance: United States of America
- Branch: United States Army
- Rank: Sergeant
- Unit: 17th Cavalry Regiment
- Commands: 1967–1968
- Conflicts: Vietnam War †
- Awards: Medal of Honor

Ray McKibben (October 27, 1945 – December 8, 1968) was a United States Army soldier and a recipient of the United States military's highest decoration—the Medal of Honor—for his actions in the Vietnam War.

== Biography ==
McKibben joined the Army from Atlanta, Georgia in 1967, and by December 1968 was serving as a Sergeant in Troop B, 7th Squadron (Airmobile), 17th Cavalry Regiment. Near Song Mao in the Republic of Vietnam, McKibben single-handedly destroyed an enemy bunker, rescued a wounded comrade from under heavy fire, and attacked and destroyed two more bunkers by himself before being mortally wounded while attacking a fourth bunker.

McKibben, aged 23 at his death, was buried at Center Baptist Church in his birth city of Felton, Georgia.

== Medal of Honor citation ==
Sergeant McKibben's official Medal of Honor citation reads:

For conspicuous gallantry and intrepidity in action at the risk of his life above and beyond the call of duty, Sgt. McKibben distinguished himself in action while serving as team leader of the point element of a reconnaissance patrol of Troop B, operating in enemy territory. Sgt. McKibben was leading his point element in a movement to contact along a well-traveled trail when the lead element came under heavy automatic weapons fire from a fortified bunker position, forcing the patrol to take cover. Sgt. McKibben, appraising the situation and without regard for his own safety, charged through bamboo and heavy brush to the fortified position, killed the enemy gunner, secured the weapon and directed his patrol element forward. As the patrol moved out, Sgt. McKibben observed enemy movement to the flank of the patrol. Fire support from helicopter gunships was requested and the area was effectively neutralized. The patrol again continued its mission and as the lead element rounded the bend of a river it came under heavy automatic weapons fire from camouflaged bunkers. As Sgt. McKibben was deploying his men to covered positions, he observed one of his men fall wounded. Although bullets were hitting all around the wounded man, Sgt. McKibben, with complete disregard for his safety, sprang to his comrade's side and under heavy enemy fire pulled him to safety behind the cover of a rock emplacement where he administered hasty first aid. Sgt. McKibben, seeing that his comrades were pinned down and were unable to deliver effective fire against the enemy bunkers, again undertook a single-handed assault of the enemy defenses. He charged through the brush and hail of automatic weapons fire closing on the first bunker, killing the enemy with accurate rifle fire and securing the enemy's weapon. He continued his assault against the next bunker, firing his rifle as he charged. As he approached the second bunker his rifle ran out of ammunition; however, he used the captured enemy weapon until it too was empty, at that time he silenced the bunker with well placed hand grenades. He reloaded his weapon and covered the advance of his men as they moved forward. Observing the fire of another bunker impeding the patrol's advance, Sgt. McKibben again single-handedly assaulted the new position. As he neared the bunker he was mortally wounded but was able to fire a final burst from his weapon killing the enemy and enabling the patrol to continue the assault. Sgt. McKibben's indomitable courage, extraordinary heroism, profound concern for the welfare of his fellow soldiers and disregard for his personal safety saved the lives of his comrades and enabled the patrol to accomplish its mission. Sgt. McKibben's gallantry in action at the cost of his life above and beyond the call of duty are in the highest traditions of the military service and reflect great credit upon himself, his unit, and the U.S. Army.

== See also ==
- List of Medal of Honor recipients
- List of Medal of Honor recipients for the Vietnam War
