= Battle of Andong =

Battle of the Korean War

- Part of Korean War
Date	29 July – 1 August 1950
Location	Andong, South Korea
Result	South Korean victory

Belligerents
South Korea	North Korea

Commanders and leaders
Unknown	Unknown

Units involved
8th Infantry Division; Capital Division	12th Infantry Division

Strength
Unknown	30 tanks

Casualties and losses
Unknown	600 dead 11 tanks destroyed

The Battle of Andong was a fight between North Korean and South Korean units in late July 1950. It was an early maneuver of the Korean War.

The Korean People's Army (KPA) 12th Infantry Division attempted to advance through Andong on its way south to Pusan, but was opposed by the Republic of Korea Army (ROK) 8th and Capital Division. The ensuing battle destroyed much of both the ROK 8th and KPA 12th Divisions, but the 12th suffered the heaviest damage; air attacks killed 600 from the division, 11 of the division's 30 T34-85 tanks were destroyed, and the division commander had been killed. The 12th Division, exhausted, had to cease its advance.

== Sources ==
- Alexander, Bevin (2003). Korea: The First War we Lost. Hippocrene Books. ISBN 978-0-7818-1019-7.
