= Kimberly Hampton =

United States Army officer

Kimberly Nicole Hampton
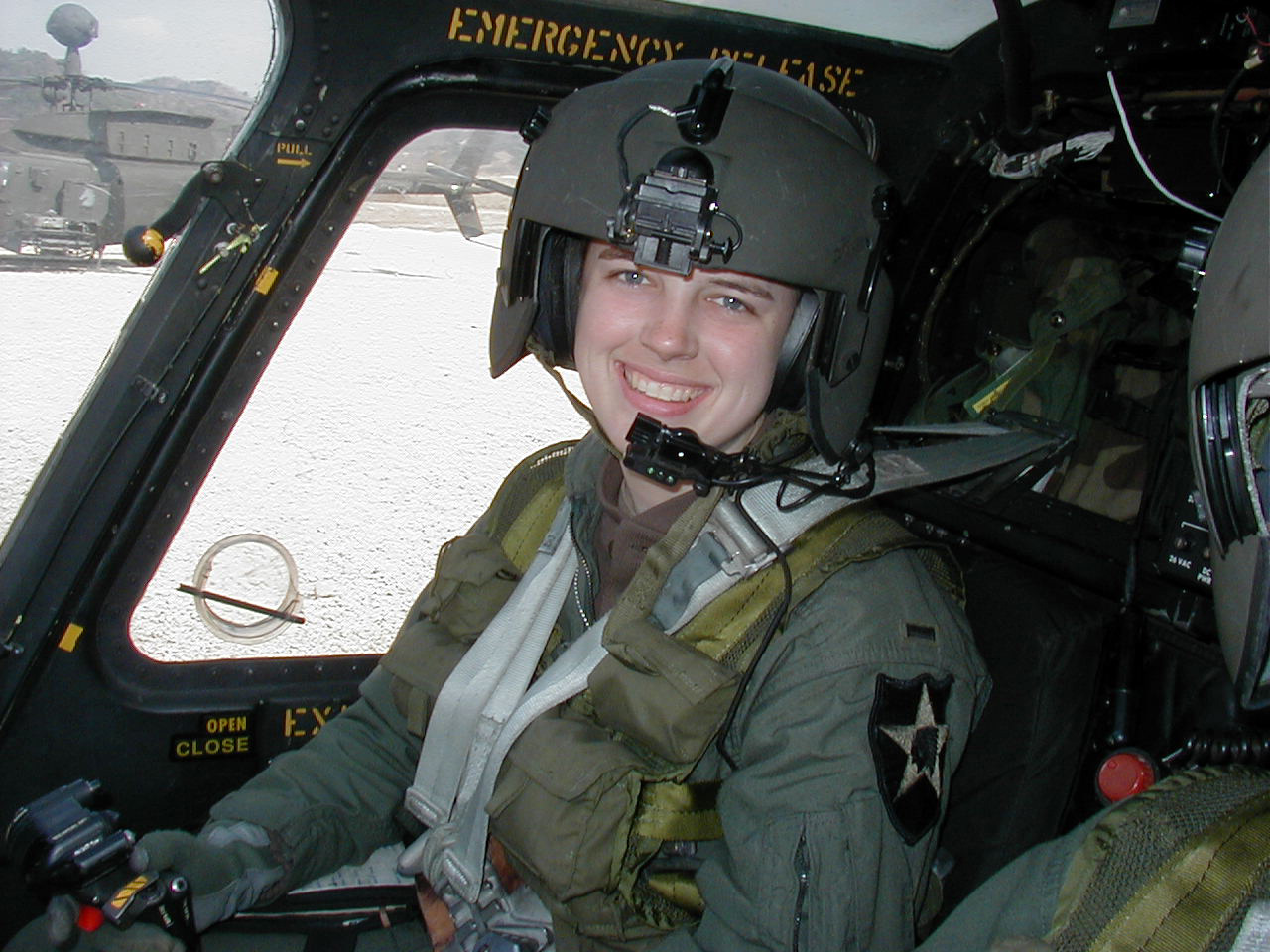
- Hampton in March 2001
- Born: August 18, 1976; Easley, South Carolina
- Died: January 2, 2004 (aged 27); Fallujah, Iraq
- Burial place: Easley, South Carolina
- Military career
- Allegiance: United States
- Branch: United States Army
- Service years: 1996–2004
- Rank: Captain
- Commands: D Troop, 1st Squadron, 17th Cavalry
- Conflicts: Iraq War
- Awards: Bronze Star Medal; Air Medal; Purple Heart

Kimberly Nicole Hampton (August 18, 1976 – January 2, 2004) was a captain in the United States Army and the first female military pilot in United States history to be shot down and killed as a result of hostile fire. She was also the first woman from South Carolina to die in the Iraq War.

== Biography ==
=== Early life ===
Hampton was born on August 18, 1976, in Greenville, South Carolina, the only child of Dale and Ann Hampton. She was childhood friends with former Philadelphia 76ers general manager Sam Hinkie. Growing up in Easley, South Carolina, she graduated from Easley High School, where she had served as the student body president, CO of the NJROTC unit, and captain of the tennis team. Hampton began her college career playing tennis for Furman University. She went on to be an honors graduate and champion tennis player at Presbyterian College. Hampton led the school team, the Blue Hose, to three consecutive South Atlantic Conference women's tennis tournament titles. She was undefeated in three years of conference singles play. She won the SAC awards for Women's Tennis Player of the Year in 1997 and 1998, and Female Athlete of the Year in 1998.

=== Military career ===
Hampton joined the United States Army Reserve Officers' Training Corps (ROTC) while in college. As a senior, she became only the second woman to serve as the school's ROTC battalion commander. Upon graduation, she attended flight training and Aviation Officer Basic Course at Fort Novosel, Alabama, where she completed the training with honors. She served two years in South Korea, and also in Afghanistan as part of the United States forces in Operation Enduring Freedom. Hampton was assigned to the 82nd Airborne Division at Fort Bragg, North Carolina before becoming the commander of Delta Troop, 1st Squadron, 17th Cavalry Regiment prior to the unit's deployment to Iraq as part of Operation Iraqi Freedom in September 2003.

=== Death and burial ===
Hampton died when the OH-58D Kiowa Warrior helicopter she was flying was shot down near Fallujah, Iraq on January 2, 2004. Captain Hampton was the first female military pilot in United States history to be shot down and killed as a result of hostile fire. She was also the first female combat casualty in Iraq from South Carolina. Captain Hampton's resting place is located in the cemetery section just east of the bell tower at Robinson Memorial Gardens on Powdersville Road near her hometown of Easley, South Carolina.

== Honors ==
Hampton was posthumously awarded the Bronze Star, Air Medal, and Purple Heart. On June 10, 2004, she was inducted into the South Atlantic Conference hall of fame. The South Carolina branch of the United States Tennis Association renamed its Tiger Hustle Award after Hampton. Presented to the most improved girl in the 12-and-under age division of the Wachovia Palmetto Championships, the renamed award was first presented in June 2004. The Easley High School NJROTC unit also named an award after her. In 2005, the Pickens County Public Library—Easley location—and the section of South Carolina Highway 88 were also named in her honor. Since 2006, Presbyterian College has annually presented a scholarship to an ROTC student in Hampton's name.

== Book ==
Kimberly Hampton's mother Ann Hampton and journalist Anna Simon wrote a book about Kimberly titled KIMBERLY'S FLIGHT: The Story of Captain Kimberly Hampton, America's First Woman Combat Pilot Killed in Battle. It was first published in May 2012.
