= Capital Mechanized Infantry Division =

Military unit of South Korea

- 수도기계화보병사단
- Capital Mechanized Infantry Division insignia
- Active: 20 June 1948 – present
- Country: South Korea
- Branch: Republic of Korea Army
- Type: Mechanized infantry
- Role: Defensive; Counter-offensive
- Size: Division
- Part of: VII Maneuver Corps
- Garrison/HQ: Gapyeong County, Gyeonggi Province
- Nickname: 맹호 (Maeng-ho / Fierce Tiger)
- March: Capital Division Hymn
- Engagements: Korean War; Operation Pokpung; Battle of Andong; Battle of Pusan Perimeter; Battle of P'ohang-dong; Battle of Kyongju; Great Naktong Offensive; UN Forces September 1950 counteroffensive; UN offensive into North Korea; Second Phase Offensive; Battle of Chosin Reservoir; UN Forces retreat from North Korea; Vietnam War; Operation Pershing; Operation Masher; Battle of Đức Cơ; Operation Thayer; Operation Hong Kil Dong; Battle of An Khe Pass; War on terror; Iraq War

Commanders
- Current commander: Maj. Gen. Yang Tae-bong
- Notable commanders: Lt. Gen. Chae Myung-shin

- Capital Mechanized Infantry Division
- Hangul: 수도기계화보병사단
- Hanja: 首都機械化步兵師團
- RR: Sudo gigyehwa bobyeong sadan
- MR: Sudo kigyehwa pobyŏng sadan

The Capital Mechanized Infantry Division (Korean: 수도기계화보병사단), also known as Fierce Tiger Division (Korean: 맹호부대; Hanja: 猛虎部隊), is currently one of the six mechanized infantry divisions in the Republic of Korea Army. It is part of the VII Maneuver Corps, tasked with covering approaches to Seoul from North Korea and counterattack operations.

This division saw extensive combat both during the Korean War and the Vietnam War, where it was dispatched in September 1965, as a part of the Republic of Korea's contribution to the South Vietnamese war effort. The 1965 deployment became possible when in August of that year the Republic of Korea's National Assembly passed a bill authorizing the action. Recently, elements of this division were sent as Republic of Korea's contribution to the "coalition of the willing" in Iraq.

== History ==
=== Korean War ===
The Division was formed on June 20, 1948, from the Capital Security Command. It was incorporated into I Corps after the first fall of Seoul, soon becoming part the defensive line formed in an attempt to slow the North Korean advance to Daejeon. It later participated in the Battle of Pusan Perimeter.

On September 16, 1950, elements of the Capital Division fought their way through the streets of Angang-ni. The next day, advancing from the west in the II Corps sector, a battalion of the 7th Division linked up with elements of the Division, closing a two-week-old gap between the ROK I and II Corps. The Korean People's Army (KPA)'s 12th Division waged a series of stubborn delaying actions against the Division in the vicinity of Kigye as the KPA retreated northward into the mountains. Kigye fell back under South Korean control on September 22, 1950.

On September 29, a message dropped from a light plane by an officer with the Military Advisory Group to the Republic of Korea, was delivered to the U.S. adviser to the ROK 3rd Division, Lt. Col. Rollins S. Emmerich. According to the message, the ROK 3rd Division was to cross the 38th Parallel and proceed to Wonsan as soon as possible. The next day the division crossed the parallel and advanced up the east coast. The division followed. After establishing command posts at Yangyang, eight miles (13 km) north of the parallel, on October 2, both divisions proceeded to Wonsan and captured the town on the tenth, well before the X Corps had landed.

On October 17, 1950, the Division captured Hamhung and its port, Hungnam.

On October 28, 1950, in far northeast Korea, a "flying column" from the Division captured Songjin, 105 miles (169 km) northeast of Hungnam. Meanwhile, the Division's 1st Regiment approached Pungsan, a town inland approximately halfway between the coast and Korea-China border on Iwon-Cinch'ong-ni-Hyesanjin road.

=== Vietnam War ===
Operation of the Fierce Tiger Division in Vietnam, 1967

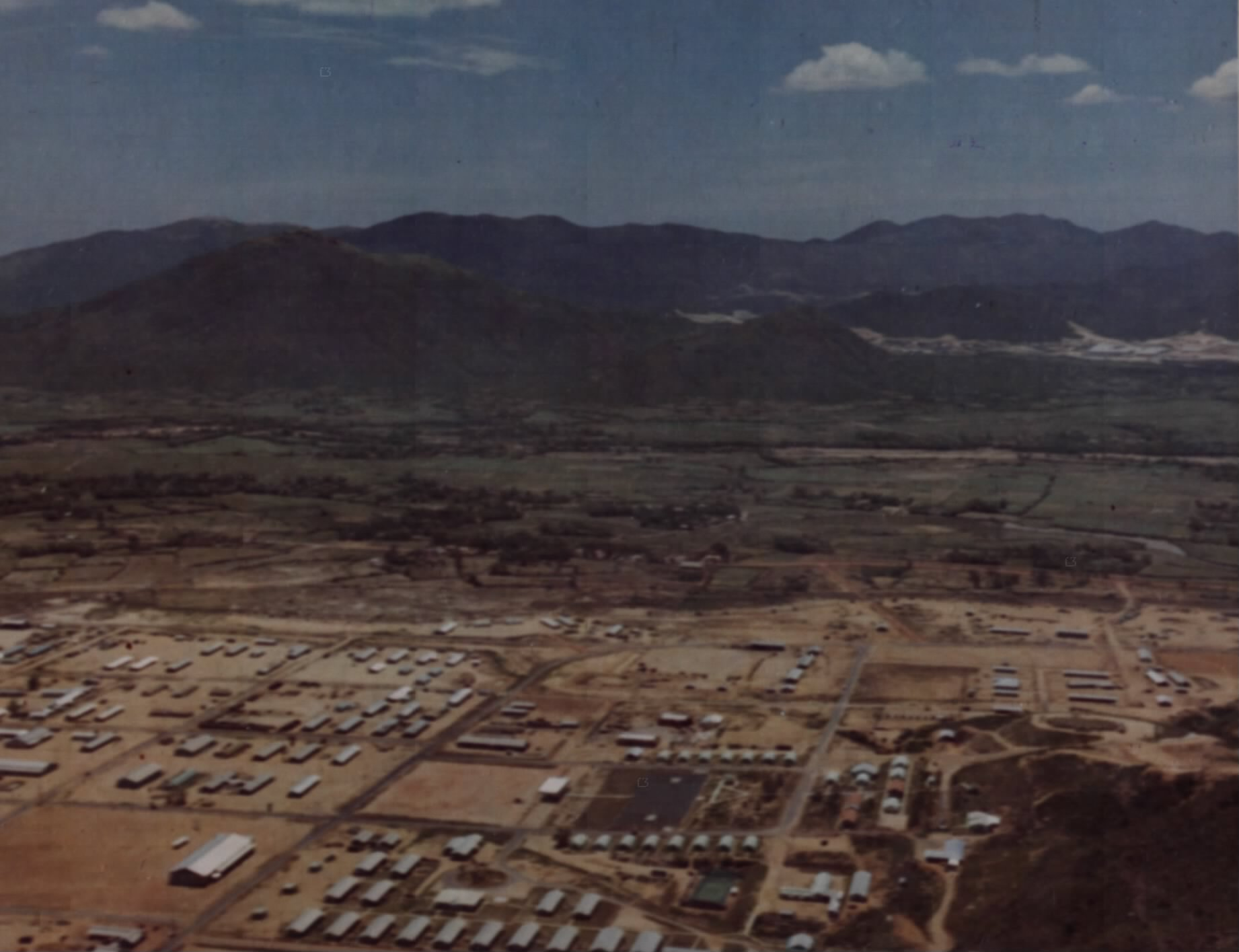
Camp Thunderbolt the Division base camp, Qui Nhon, August 1968

The Capital Division arrived in South Vietnam on September 22, 1965. The Division was deployed just outside Qui Nhơn in Bình Định Province, from where it could protect vital arteries such as Route 1 and Route 19, as well as rice-growing areas and foothills to the north and west.

The 1st Brigade, 101st Airborne Division was stationed in the Qui Nhơn area prior to the arrival of the Capital Division and gradually turned over responsibility for the area during October 1965.

By June 1966 the Capital Division controlled all the area north of Qui Nhơn to the east of Route 1 and up to the base of Phù Cát Mountain. It extended its control also to the north and south of Route 19 up to the pass leading into An Khê. Working south along Highway 1 down toward Tuy Hoa and within Bình Định Province, the Division sent out reconnaissance parties and carried out small operations as far south as the border between Bình Định Province and Phú Yên Province.

Korean soldiers that volunteered for service in South Vietnam were given bonuses: they would "receive credit for three years of military duty for each year served in Vietnam as well as additional monetary entitlements; further, combat duty would enhance their future Army careers."

All the ROK units sent to the Vietnam War (Capital Division (Fierce Tiger), 9th Infantry Division (White Horse) and 2nd Marine Brigade (Blue Dragon)) were chosen because they were considered to have the longest and best records from the Korean War.

The Fierce Tigers were considered uncanny for their ability to search territory and smoke out enemy soldiers and weapons. They would plan operations meticulously and sometimes even rehearse it beforehand. The soldiers would seal off a relatively small area, no more than 9 or 10 square kilometers. Troops would be brought in by air and land, but would arrive at the same time to maximize the chokehold. Slowly but surely the cordon would be tightened, and everyone and everything would be searched. Civilians were separated and interrogated, routinely offered rewards if they cooperated. It was not unusual for an area to be searched three or four times by different platoons. To prevent enemy breakouts, the Koreans had special reaction forces that could plug holes in the perimeter. General William R. Peers considered the Koreans the best at these so-called "cordon and search operations."

The Division returned home March 11, 1973.

Significant operations and actions involving the Division include:

- Operation Maeng Ho V (맹호5호 작전): a search and destroy operation in Bình Định Province from 23 to 27 March 1966. ROK claimed 349 Vietcong (VC) killed for the loss of 17 ROK
- Operation Su Bok (수복 작전): in Bình Định Province from 26 March to 23 September 1966. ROK claimed 299 VC killed and 88 weapons captured for the loss of 23 ROK
- Operation Bun Kae 66-5 (번개66-5호 작전): in Bình Định Province from 2 to 13 April 1966. ROK claimed 292 VC killed for the loss of 23 ROK
- Battle of Đức Cơ (두코 전투): from 9 August to 10 1966
- Operation Bun Kae 66-7 (번개66-7호 작전): between the Vĩnh Thạnh and Soui Ca Valleys of Bình Định Province from 16 May to 5 June 1966, in conjunction with the 1st Cavalry Division (Operation Crazy Horse) and Army of the Republic of Vietnam (ARVN) results in 501 VC killed
- Operation Bun Kae 66-9 (번개66-9호 작전): in Pleiku Province from 9 July until mid August 1966. ROK claimed 106 VC killed for the loss of 7 ROK
- Operation Maeng Ho VI (맹호6호 작전): a search and destroy operation with the 1st Cavalry Division and ARVN 22nd Division in Bình Định Province from 2 to 24 October 1966. ROK claimed 240 VC killed as part of Operation Irving
- Operation Maeng Ho VIII (맹호7호 작전): a search and clear operation along Route 1 in Phú Yên Province from 3 to 31 January 1967 results in 150 VC killed
- Operation Pershing: a search and destroy operation with the 1st Cavalry Division, 3rd Brigade, 25th Infantry Division and ARVN 22nd Division in Bình Định Province from 12 February 1967 to 19 January 1968. U.S. claimed 5,401 People's Army of Vietnam (PAVN)/VC killed
- Operation Oh Jak Kyo (오작교 작전): to link up the Division's tactical area of responsibility with the 9th Infantry Division in Phú Yên Province from 8 March to 18 April 1967. ROK claimed 831 VC killed and 659 weapons captured for the loss of 23 ROK
- Operation Hong Kil Dong (홍길동 작전): with the 9th Infantry Division near Tuy Hòa from 9 July to 21 August 1967. ROK claimed 638 PAVN killed and 26 ROK. 98 crew-served and 359 individual weapons were captured
- Battle near Phù Cát Air Base: from 23 to 29 January. ROK claimed 278 PAVN killed for the loss of 11 ROK. In addition 145 individual and 21 crew-served weapons were captured. The U.S. Army manual on Korean participation in Vietnam states that "[a]n analysis of the action clearly illustrates the Korean technique. After contact with an enemy force... the Koreans reacting swiftly...deployed six companies in an encircling maneuver and trapped the enemy force in their cordon. The Korean troops gradually tightened the circle, fighting the enemy during the day and maintaining their tight cordon at night, thus preventing the enemy's escape.
- Operation Baek Ma 9 (백마9호 작전): from 11 October to 4 November 1968. ROK claimed 382 PAVN killed and the PAVN 7th Battalion, 18th Regiment, rendered ineffective. During this operation, on 25 October, the eighteenth anniversary of the Division, with the ROK claiming 204 PAVN killed without the loss of a single Korean soldier.
- Battle of An Khe Pass (안케패스 전투): from 11 April to 26 April 1972.

==== Commanders during the Vietnam War ====
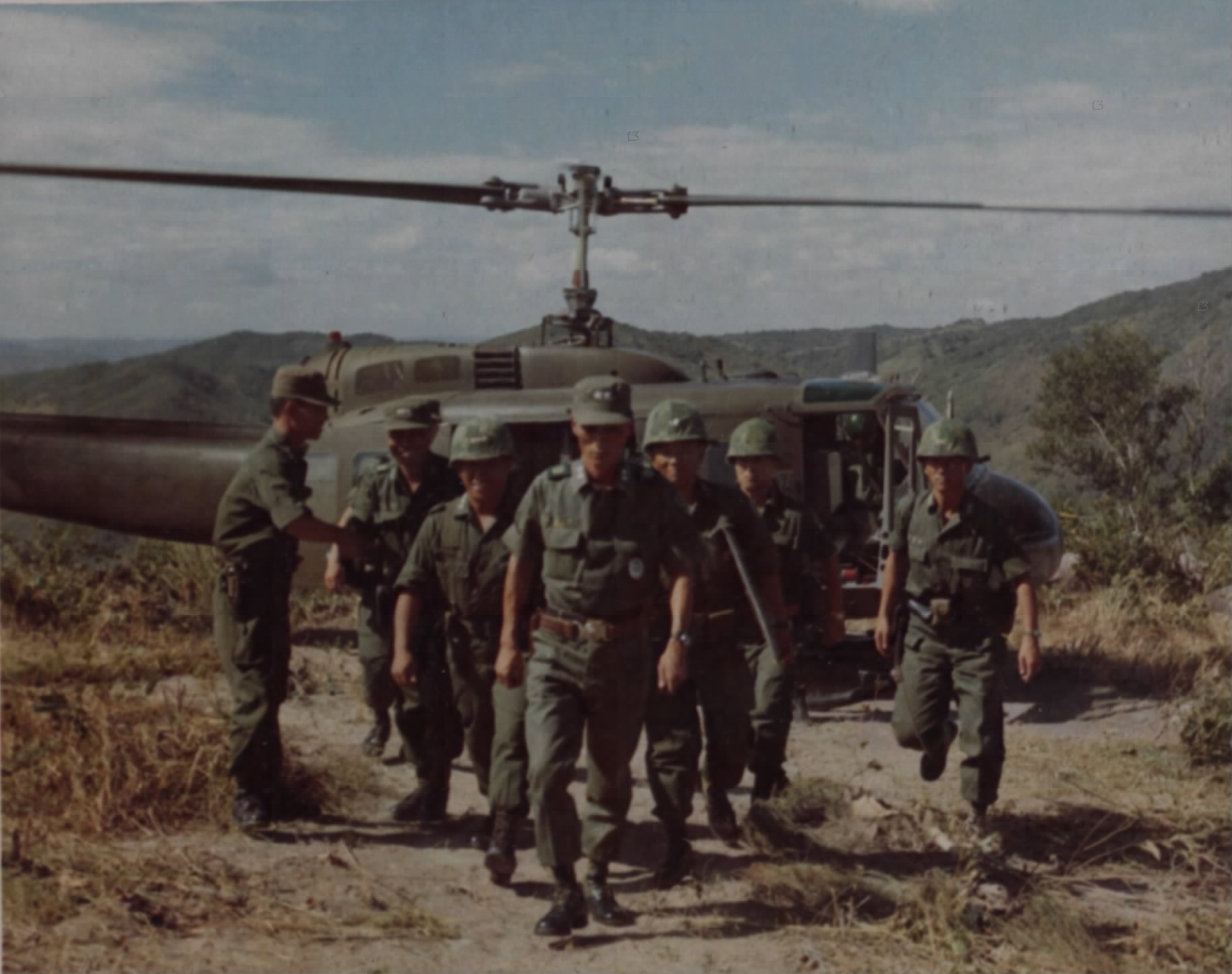
MG Sun-Min Chung, arrives at the camp of the 26th Infantry Regiment by UH-1D, 24 August 1968

- Aug 1965 - Sep 1966 Maj. Gen. Chae Myung-shin
- Sep 1966 - Sep 1967 Maj. Gen. Yu Byung-hyun
- Sep 1967 - Oct 1968 Maj. Gen. Chung Sun-min
- Oct 1968 - Nov 1969 Maj. Gen. Yun Pil-yung
- ? - ? Maj. Gen. Kim Hak-won
- ? - ? Maj. Gen. Yi Hee-sung
- ? - ? Maj. Gen. Chung Duk-man

==== Order of battle during Vietnam War ====
- Divisional Headquarters and Headquarters Company
- Cavalry Regiment, composed of three infantry battalions
- 1st Infantry Regiment, composed of three infantry battalions
- 26th Infantry Regiment, composed of three infantry battalions
- Headquarters and Headquarters Battery, Division Artillery
- 10th Field Artillery Battalion (105 mm)
- 60th Field Artillery Battalion (105 mm)
- 61st Field Artillery Battalion (105 mm)
- 628th Field Artillery Battalion (155 mm)
- Divisional Engineer Battalion
- Armor company

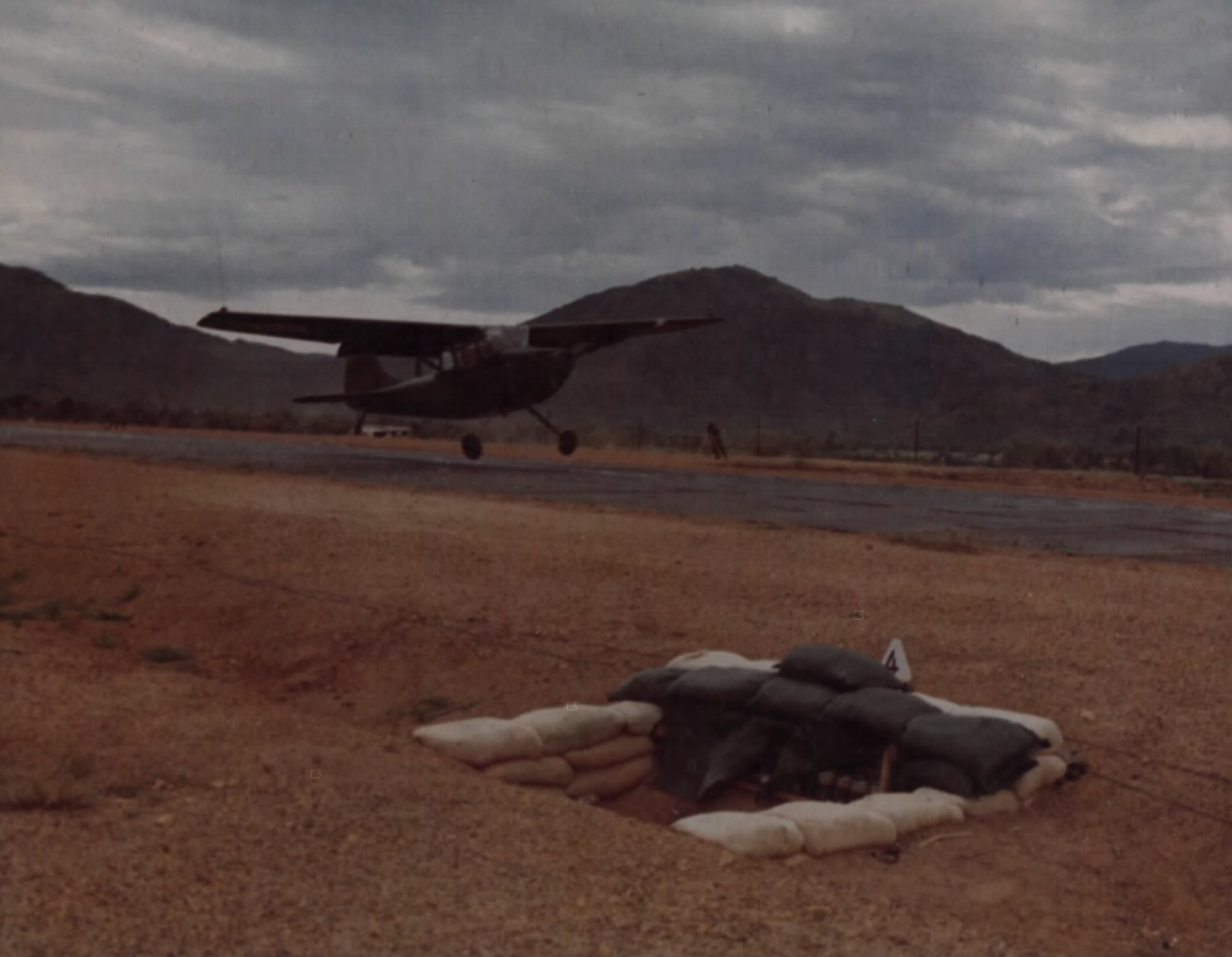
A Division O-1 takes off from ROK Strip Airfield, 3 September 1968

- Reconnaissance Company
- Signal Company
- Military Police Company
- Medical Company
- Ordnance Company
- Quartermaster Company
- Replacement Company
- Aviation Section

==== Unit statistics for the Vietnam War ====
Start Date	End Date	Deployed			Combat			KIA			WIA		
Start Date	End Date	Officer	Non-officer	Total	Large	Small	Total	Officer	Non-officer	Total	Officer	Non-officer	Total
October 22, 1965	March 7, 1973	7,652	107,340	114,992	521	174,586	175,107	186	1,925	2,111	246	4,228	4,474

- US Units that served alongside the Tiger Division were numerous and included:

9th Division Black Panthers.
504th Military Police Battalion, C Company

=== After Vietnam War ===
The Tiger Division was reorganized in 1980s to parallel the reorganization taking place in United States Army at the same time. The "regiments" of the older organization were replaced by "brigades," consisting of both armor and mechanized infantry components. The 1st and Cavalry regiments were reorganized to include two mechanized infantry battalions and an armored battalion each, while the 26th regiment became an armored brigade with two armored battalions and a mechanized infantry battalion. As 8th Mechanized Infantry Division and 26th Mechanized Infantry Division were consolidated into the new 8th Mechanized Infantry Division on November 30, 2018, Cavalry Brigade was reassigned to 8th Division and in exchange, the Tiger Division received 16th Brigade.

== Current structure ==
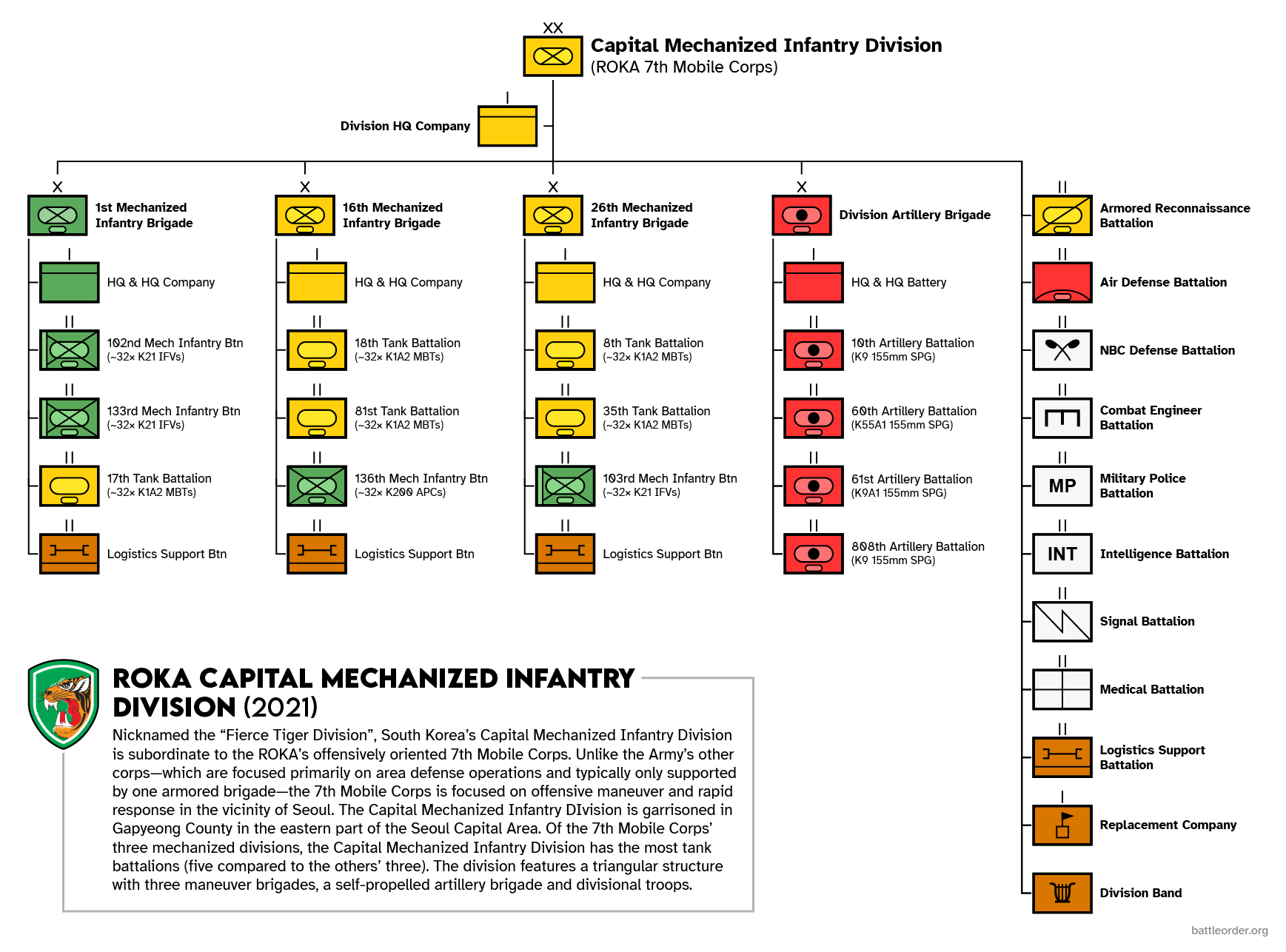
ROKA Capital Mechanized Infantry Division organization

- 1st Mechanized Infantry Brigade
  - 1st Brigade Headquarters and Headquarters Company
  - 102nd Mechanized Infantry Battalion (K21)
  - 133rd Mechanized Infantry Battalion (K21)
  - 17th Tank Battalion (K1A2)
  - Support Battalion
- 16th Mechanized Infantry Brigade (belongs to ROK-US Combined Division)
  - 16th Brigade Headquarters and Headquarters Company
  - 18th Tank Battalion (K1A2)
  - 81st Tank Battalion (K1A2)
  - 136th Mechanized Infantry Battalion (K200)
  - Support Battalion
- 26th Mechanized Infantry Brigade
  - 26th Brigade Headquarters and Headquarters Company
  - 8th Tank Battalion (K1A2)
  - 35th Tank Battalion (K1A2)
  - 103rd Mechanized Infantry Battalion (K21)
  - Support Battalion
- Division Artillery Brigade
  - Division Artillery Brigade Headquarters and Headquarters Battery
  - 10th Artillery Battalion (K9 155mm)
  - 60th Artillery Battalion (K-55A1 155mm)
  - 61st Artillery Battalion (K9A1 155mm)
  - 808th Artillery Battalion (K9 155mm)
- Intelligence Battalion
- Signal Battalion
- Armored Reconnaissance Battalion
- Combat Engineer Battalion
- Air Defense Battalion
- Support Transport Battalion
- Medical Battalion
- CBR Battalion
- Military Police Battalion
- Replacement Company
- Headquarters Company

== Unit of the VII Maneuver Corps ==
- 2nd Quick Response Division
- 8th Maneuver Division
- 11th Maneuver Division

== See also ==
- Republic of Korea Army
