= Michael John Fitzmaurice =

US Army Specialist 4, Medal of Honor & Purple Heart (1971)

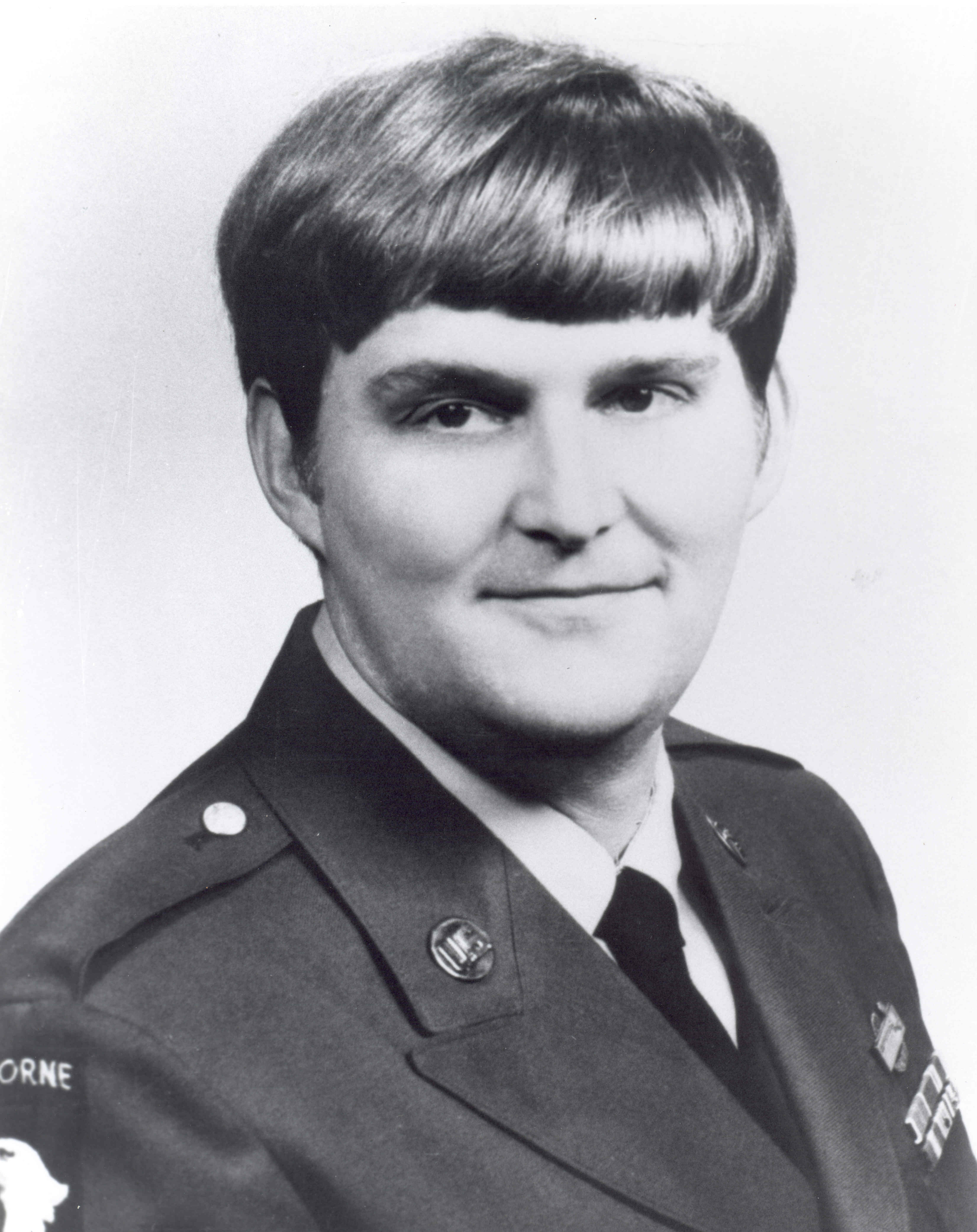
- Fitzmaurice c. 1971
- Born: March 9, 1950 (age 76); Jamestown, North Dakota
- Military career
- Allegiance: United States
- Branch: United States Army
- Service years: 1969-1972 (US Army), 1987-2011 (South Dakota National Guard)
- Rank: Specialist Four
- Units: 17th Cavalry Regiment, 101st Airborne Division
- Conflicts: Vietnam War
- Awards: Medal of Honor; Purple Heart

Michael John Fitzmaurice (born March 9, 1950) is a former United States Army soldier and a recipient of the United States military's highest decoration, the Medal of Honor, for his actions during the Vietnam War.

== Military career ==
Fitzmaurice joined the United States Army from his birth city of Jamestown, North Dakota in 1969, and by March 23, 1971, was serving as a specialist four in Troop D, 2nd Squadron, 17th Cavalry Regiment, 101st Airborne Division.

During a firefight on that day, in Khe Sanh, Republic of Vietnam, Fitzmaurice smothered the blast of an enemy-thrown explosive charge with his flak vest and body to protect other soldiers. Seriously wounded and partially blinded by the blast, he then continued to fight the enemy. After his rifle was damaged by a second explosive blast, Fitzmaurice proceeded to acquire another rifle from a Viet Cong sapper, defeating him with his bare hands, and continued to fight, refusing medical evacuation.

Fitzmaurice survived his wounds, discharged in 1972 and was subsequently awarded the Medal of Honor for his actions in 1973.

Fitzmaurice joined the South Dakota Army and Air National Guard and worked with local VA from 1987 and retired in 2011.

In October 2024, Fitzmaurice joined 15 other Medal of Honor recipients in publicly endorsing Donald Trump for president.

== Medal of Honor citation ==
Specialist Fitzmaurice's official Medal of Honor citation reads:

The Medal of Honor being presented to SP4 Michael J. Fitzmaurice by President Richard M. Nixon at the White House, while members of his family and another recipient look on.

For conspicuous gallantry and intrepidity in action at the risk of his life above and beyond the call of duty. SPC. Fitzmaurice, 3d Platoon, Troop D, distinguished himself at Khe Sanh. Spc4. Fitzmaurice and 3 fellow soldiers were occupying a bunker when a company of North Vietnamese sappers infiltrated the area. At the onset of the attack Sp4c. Fitzmaurice observed 3 explosive charges which had been thrown into the bunker by the enemy. Realizing the imminent danger to his comrades, and with complete disregard for his personal safety, he hurled 2 of the charges out of the bunker. He then threw his flak vest and himself over the remaining charge. By this courageous act he absorbed the blast and shielded his fellow-soldiers. Although suffering from serious multiple wounds and partial loss of sight, he charged out of the bunker, and engaged the enemy until his rifle was damaged by the blast of an enemy hand grenade. While in search of another weapon, Sp4c. Fitzmaurice encountered and overcame an enemy sapper in hand-to-hand combat. Having obtained another weapon, he returned to his original fighting position and inflicted additional casualties on the attacking enemy. Although seriously wounded, Sp4c. Fitzmaurice refused to be medically evacuated, preferring to remain at his post. Sp4c. Fitzmaurice's extraordinary heroism in action at the risk of his life contributed significantly to the successful defense of the position and resulted in saving the lives of a number of his fellow soldiers. These acts of heroism go above and beyond the call of duty, are in keeping with the highest traditions of the military service, and reflect great credit on Sp4c. Fitzmaurice and the U.S. Army.

== See also ==
- List of Medal of Honor recipients for the Vietnam War
