= Robert Martin Patterson =

United States Army Medal of Honor recipient

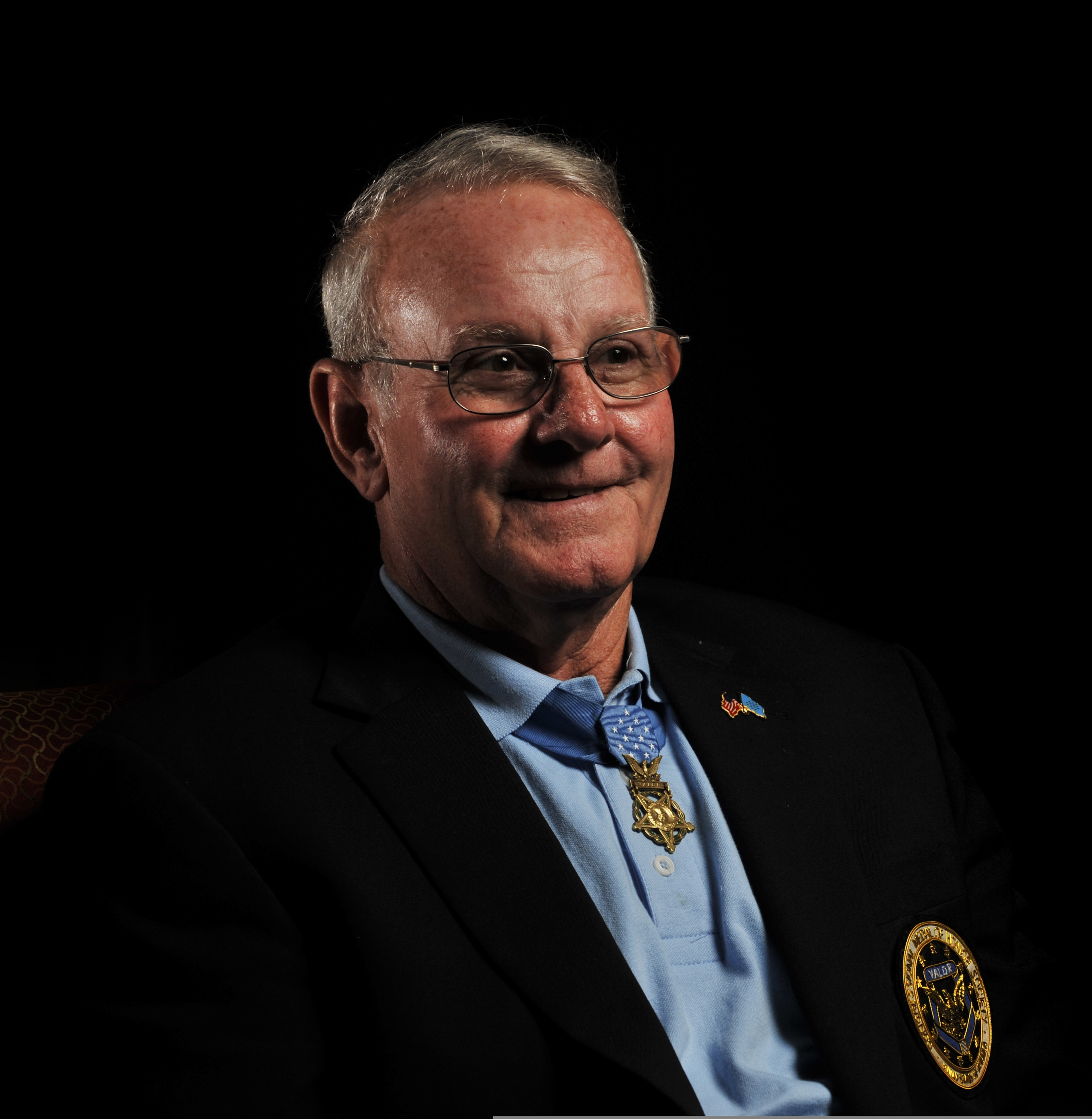
- Patterson in 2012
- Born: April 16, 1948 (age 78); Durham, North Carolina
- Military career
- Allegiance: United States
- Branch: United States Army
- Service years: 1966–1991
- Rank: Command Sergeant Major
- Nickname: Bob
- Unit: 17th Cavalry Regiment
- Conflicts: Vietnam War; Gulf War
- Awards: Medal of Honor; Legion of Merit; Bronze Star Medal; Purple Heart (3); Meritorious Service Medal (3); Army Achievement Medal

Robert Martin Patterson (born April 16, 1948) is a retired United States Army soldier and a recipient of the United States military's highest decoration, the Medal of Honor, for his actions in the Vietnam War.

== Military career ==
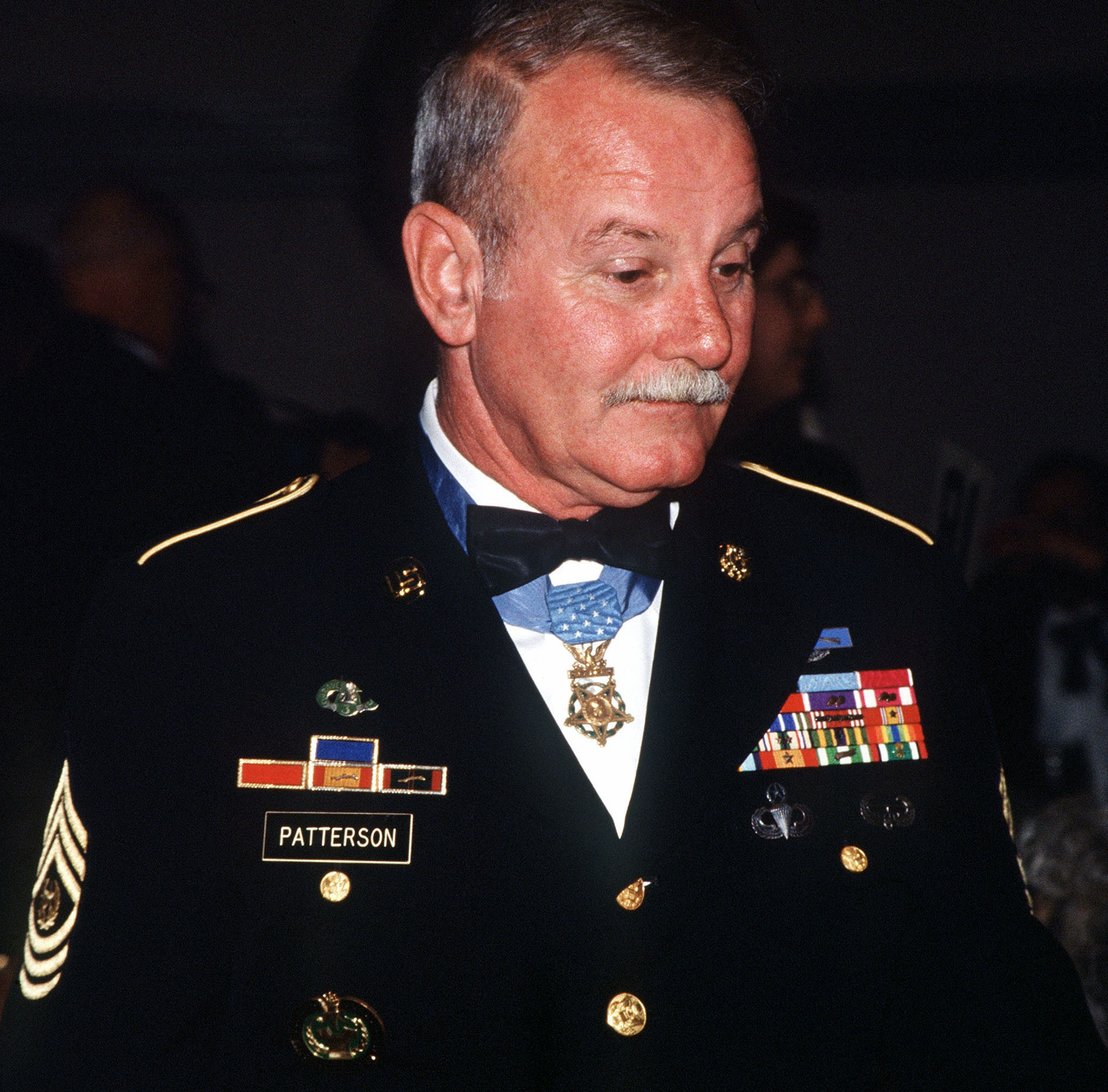
Patterson in 1997

Patterson grew up in a family of tobacco farmers in Fayetteville, North Carolina. Patterson joined the United States Army from Raleigh, North Carolina, in 1966, and by May 6, 1968, was serving as a specialist four in Troop B, 2nd Squadron, 17th Cavalry Regiment. During a firefight on that day, near La Chu, Thừa Thiên Province, South Vietnam, during the May Offensive, Patterson single-handedly destroyed a series of enemy bunkers. For his actions during the battle, he was awarded the Medal of Honor and promoted to sergeant.

In the mid-1970s, Patterson, by then a staff sergeant, served as a Basic Training drill sergeant at Fort Bliss, Texas.

Patterson reached the army's highest enlisted rank, Command Sergeant Major, and served in the Gulf War before retiring in 1991.

== Later life ==
Patterson resides in Pace, Florida, having moved there in 2010.

In October 2024, Patterson joined 15 other Medal of Honor recipients in publicly endorsing Donald Trump for president.

== Medal of Honor citation ==
Patterson's official Medal of Honor citation reads:

For conspicuous gallantry and intrepidity in action at the risk of his life above and beyond the call of duty. Sgt. Patterson (then Sp4c.) distinguished himself while serving as a fire team leader of the 3d Platoon, Troop B, during an assault against a North Vietnamese Army battalion which was entrenched in a heavily fortified position. When the leading squad of the 3d Platoon was pinned down by heavy interlocking automatic weapon and rocket propelled grenade fire from 2 enemy bunkers, Sgt. Patterson and the 2 other members of his assault team moved forward under a hail of enemy fire to destroy the bunkers with grenade and machine gun fire. Observing that his comrades were being fired on from a third enemy bunker covered by enemy gunners in 1-man spider holes, Sgt. Patterson, with complete disregard for his safety and ignoring the warning of his comrades that he was moving into a bunker complex, assaulted and destroyed the position. Although exposed to intensive small arm and grenade fire from the bunkers and their mutually supporting emplacements. Sgt. Patterson continued his assault upon the bunkers which were impeding the advance of his unit. Sgt. Patterson singlehandedly destroyed by rifle and grenade fire 5 enemy bunkers, killed 8 enemy soldiers and captured 7 weapons. His dauntless courage and heroism inspired his platoon to resume the attack and to penetrate the enemy defensive position. Sgt. Patterson's action at the risk of his life has reflected great credit upon himself, his unit, and the U.S. Army.

== See also ==
- List of Medal of Honor recipients for the Vietnam War
