= Felton, Georgia =

- Unincorporated community
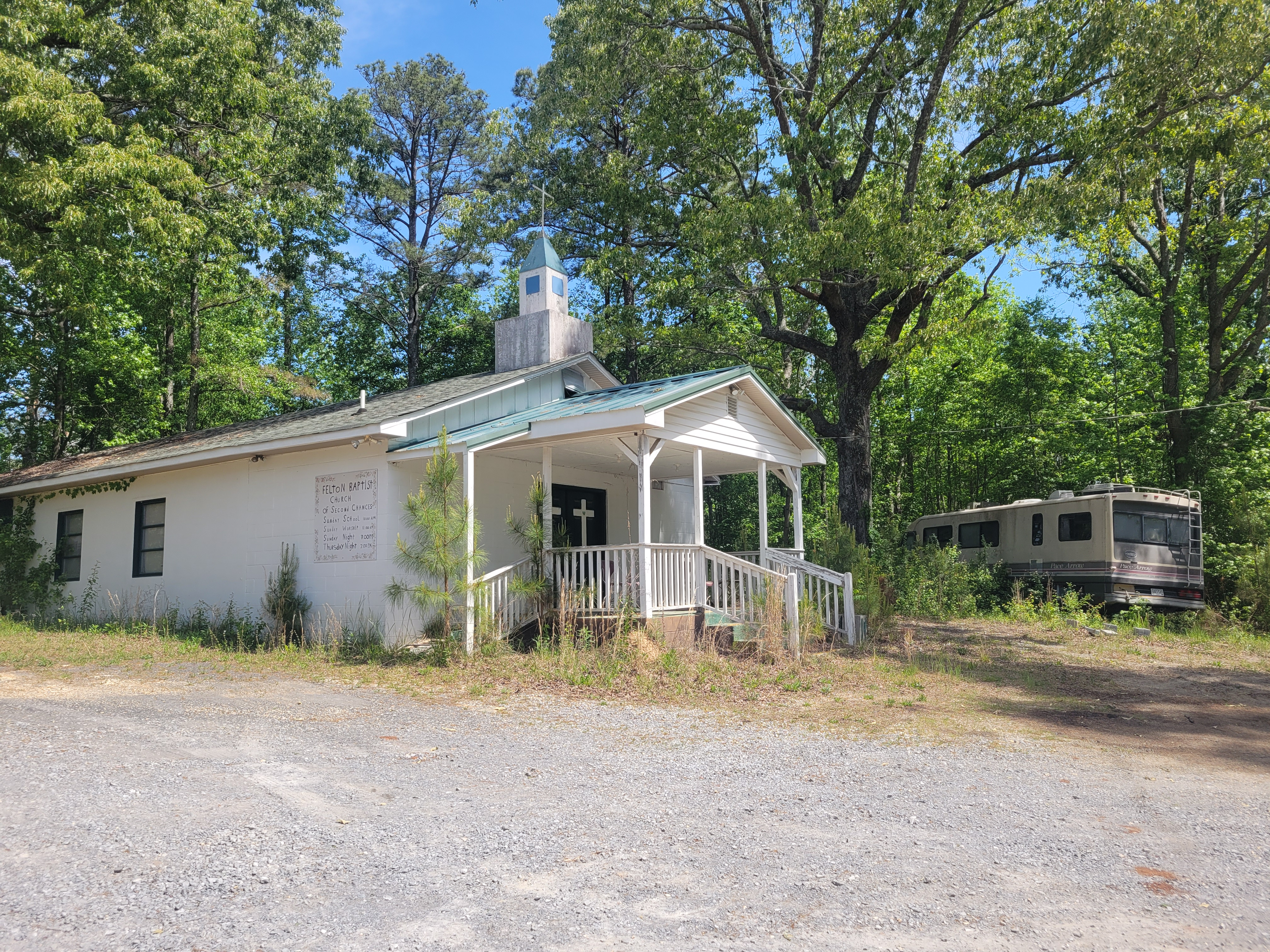
- Felton Baptist Church of Second Chances

- Location within Georgia Location within the United States
- Coordinates: 33°53′17″N 85°13′25″W
- Country: United States
- State: Georgia
- County: Haralson
- Elevation: 1,197 ft (365 m)
- Time zone: UTC-5 (Eastern (EST))
  - Summer (DST): UTC-4 (EDT)
- ZIP code: 30140
- Area codes: 770, 678, 470
- GNIS feature ID: 326274

Felton is an unincorporated community in Haralson County, Georgia, United States. The community is located along U.S. Route 27, 6.2 miles (10.0 km) north-northwest of Buchanan. Felton has a post office with ZIP code 30140.
