= Lane Army Airfield =

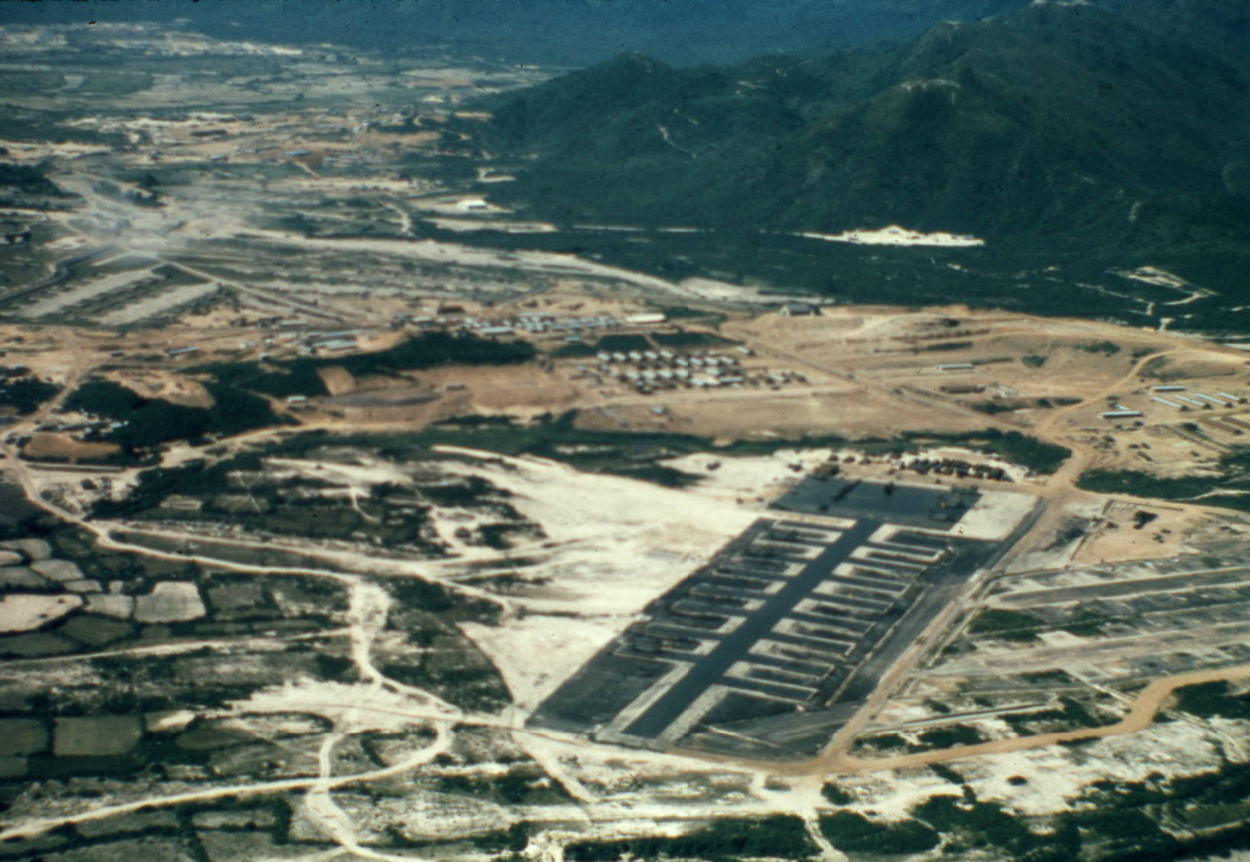
- Lane Army Airfield, 1 May 1967

Location
- Coordinates: 13.808°N 109.095°E

Site history
- Built: 1965
- In use: 1965-present
- Battles/wars: Vietnam War

Lane Army Airfield
- IATA: none; ICAO: none

Summary
- Elevation AMSL: 40 ft (12 m)

Lane Army Airfield (also known as Lane Army Heliport or An Son Airfield) is a former United States Army base west of Qui Nhơn in Bình Định Province, Vietnam.

== History ==
The base was originally established in late 1965 by the 70th Engineer Battalion approximately 14 km west of Qui Nhơn and southwest of the Highway 19 and Highway 1 intersection. The base was named after SP5 James Lane of the 8th Transportation Company who was killed in action on 16 July 1962. The base's first occupants were the 161st Aviation Company which was based there from 1965 until 1967.

Other units stationed at Lane at various times included:

- Troop H, 10th Cavalry Regiment (April 1972-February 1973)
- 7th Squadron, 17th Cavalry Regiment (1971-2)
- 61st Aviation Company (November 1967-March 1972)
- 128th Assault Helicopter Company
- 129th Assault Helicopter Company (October 1965-March 1973)
- 174th Assault Helicopter Company
- 196th Assault Support Helicopter Company (January 1967-December 1970)
- 498th Medical Company

On 5 March 1971 Boeing CH-47C Chinook #67-18518 of the 180th Assault Support Helicopter Company on approach to Lane collided with a Republic of Korea Army Cessna O-1D Bird Dog causing both aircraft to crash killing 5 passengers and crew on the CH-47 and the pilot of the O-1.

== Current use ==
The base appears to remain in use by the People's Army of Vietnam.
