= 17th Cavalry Regiment (United States) =

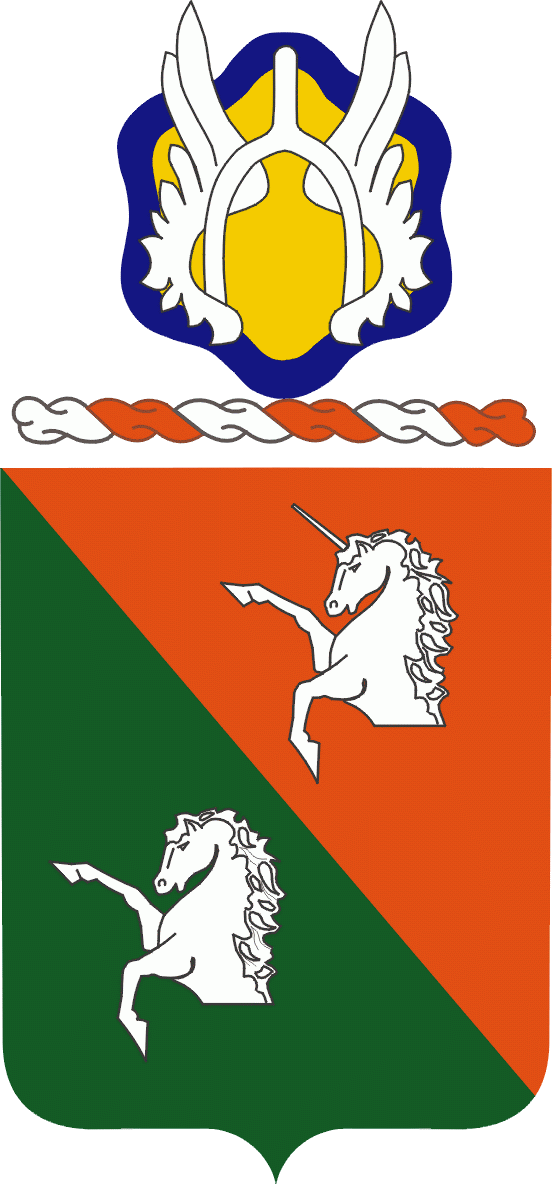
- 17th Cavalry Regiment coat of arms
- Active: 1916-1921; 1927-1941; 1957-
- Country: United States of America
- Branch: United States Army
- Type: Cavalry, aviation
- Part of: United States Army Aviation Branch
- Motto: "Out front"
- Colors: Yellow
- Engagements: World War II; Vietnam War; Operation Urgent Fury; Operation Just Cause; Operation Desert Storm; Operation Restore Hope; Operation Iraqi Freedom

Insignia
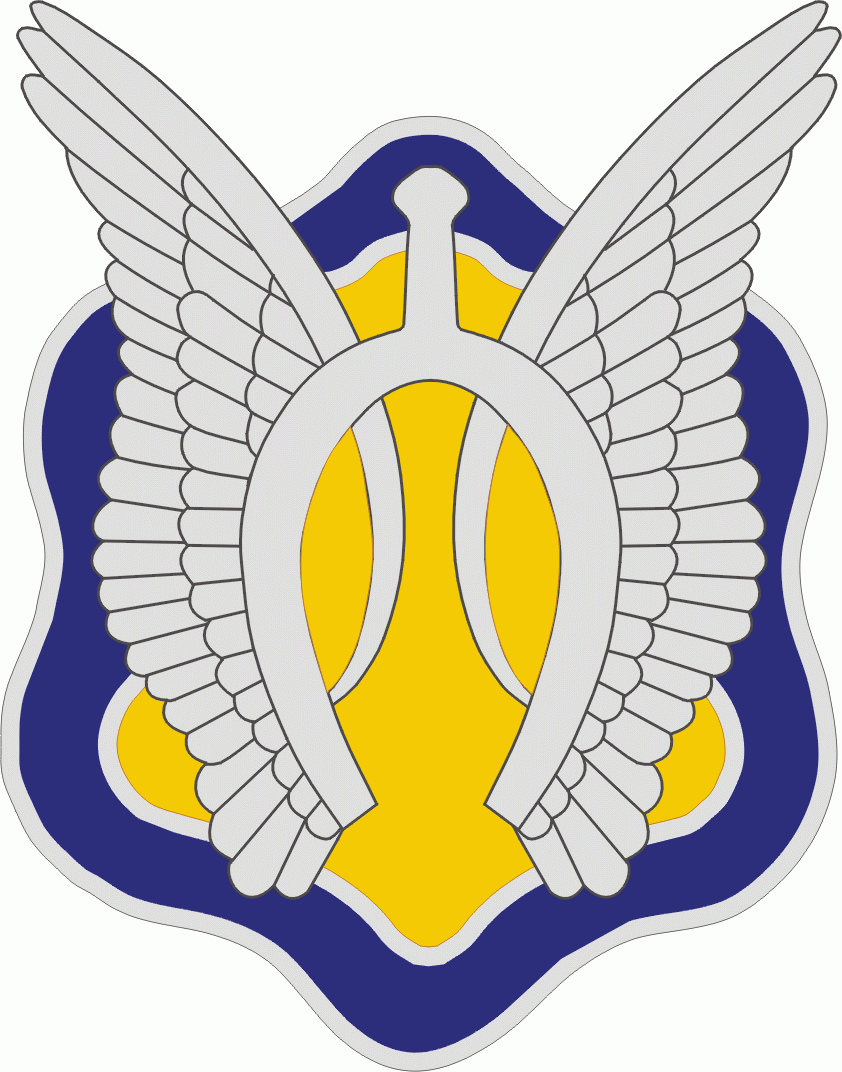
- Regimental distinctive insignia

- Beret flash worn by 1st Squadron, 17th Cavalry

- Former beret flash worn by 2nd Squadron, 17th Cavalry from 1974-1979

- Background trimming worn by 1st and 2nd Squadrons, 17th Cavalry

The 17th Cavalry Regiment is a United States Army Regimental System (USARS) parent regiment which is effectively part of the United States Army Aviation Branch.

It was established as a regiment of cavalry after the U.S. Pancho Villa Expedition into Mexico in mid-1916. The unit was constituted on 1 July 1916 in the Regular Army as the 17th Cavalry at Fort Bliss, Texas and originally inactivated 26 September 1921 at the Presidio of Monterey, California. Formerly a part of the 1950s Combat Arms Regimental System, it was reorganized as a part of the USARS in the 1980s. In the mid-2020s, the Regiment is found within the combat aviation brigades across the army, where the squadrons, now constituted as attack/reconnaissance helicopter squadrons, carry on its legacy, lineage, traditions, and fighting spirit.

== History ==
=== Formation ===
The 17th Cavalry Regiment was organized under the provisions of the National Defense Act of 1916 at Fort Bliss, Texas on 30 June 1916 and constituted on 1 July 1916. Brigadier General John J. Pershing had taken his columns into Mexico only a short time before and the need of cavalry troops was pressing. Thirty-two officers and seven hundred and ninety-one veterans from the 1st, 3rd, 6th, 8th and 14th Cavalry Regiments were transferred as the nucleus of the new regiment. Many of these were recalled from the Mexican Punitive Expedition and since all were experienced troopers, little time was spent in whipping the organization into shape. The regimental commander, Colonel Willard A. Holbrook, assumed command on 9 July 1916, on which date the men from the 8th joined the 17th Cavalry Regiment. Colonel Holbrook held command until he was promoted to the rank of major general.

In honor of the cavalry regiments that contributed officers, men and experience to the formation of the 17th Cavalry Regiment, the regimental shield shares much from the coats of arm of those units. Orange is from the 1st Cavalry and was the official color that has historically represented dragoons. The color green was taken from the 3d Cavalry. Their uniforms contained green facings in honor of the 3d Cavalry's first engagement at Vera Cruz, and its contribution throughout the campaign of 1847 to the capture of Mexico City. The regiment chose the unicorn from the 6th Cavalry Regiment, which represents the knightly virtues and, in the rampant position, a symbol of fighting aggressiveness, combined with speed and alacrity. The demi-horse, in honor of cavalry mounts, was taken from the shield of the 8th Cavalry Regiment. The diagonal line, being the traditional military symbol of cavalry, came from the 14th Cavalry.

The first mounted formation of the regiment was held on 4 August 1916 and consisted of all fifteen troops and the wagons of the supply troop.

=== Arizona ===
On 14 May 1917, over five weeks after the American entry into World War I, the regiment received orders for a change of station due to disturbances along the border of Arizona. By 17 May, the regiment loaded up on trains and traveled from El Paso to arrive at Douglas, Arizona, on the mid-afternoon of 18 May. The regiment established itself at Camp Harry J. Jones, Douglas, Arizona, with outposts near Naco, Arizona (30 miles west along the border), west of town near the C & A Copper Smelter, Forrest, Arizona, and Slaughter's Ranch (13 miles east).

Trouble began in the copper mining districts of Arizona as the Industrial Workers of the World union became unmanageable. On 5 July 1917 a provisional squadron, under the command of Lieutenant Colonel White, marched north to Globe, Arizona, for strike duty. Later that month, forest fires in Mormon Canyon (Turkey Creek) grew beyond the control of the forest rangers, prompting another call for assistance by the civil leaders; a detail of fifty men under Second Lieutenant Arthur S. Harrington was deployed to assist them. The regiment would remain in the Southwest until the end of World War I. After the Armistice with Germany was signed in November 1918, the regiment was under orders to move to Hawaii. Among the junior officers who served with the 17th Cavalry was First Lieutenant Lucian Truscott, later to become a four-star general officer.

=== Hawaii ===
On 5 April 1919, the 17th Cavalry set sail from San Francisco on the USAT Sherman, bound for Honolulu and Schofield Barracks. The massive demobilization following the end of World War I, would leave the 17th Cavalry manning the garrison at Fort Shafter and Schofield Barracks until the fall of 1920. Still, the problem remained of covering approximately one hundred miles of rugged coast line with one regiment of cavalry to effectively repel any attempted landing of troops from transports and hold them off until the arrival of reinforcements. With the exception of the sector in and around the city of Honolulu and Pearl Harbor, the entire coast line of the island was left to the 17th Cavalry Regiment. The regiment developed an intricate system of shielded lights and telephone lines for command and control as well as reporting, with camps placed in locations that provided cover and concealment from the air or sea.

Postwar reorganization of the Army resulted in a reduction of the number of cavalry regiments from seventeen to fourteen, including inactivation of the 17th Cavalry. Lack of funds, reduced personnel authorization, and serious doubts that "the mounted combat of large bodies of cavalry is probably a thing of the past" contributed to the decision as well as a new regimental organization that was designed to reduce overhead, increase firepower, and retain mobility. Many storied cavalry units came dangerously close to being lost because of organizational changes, but a new policy of retaining units on the rolls of the Army in an inactive status was established, preserving unit designations and histories for future use rather than disbanding or re-designating them.

The 17th Cavalry left Schofield Barracks by truck for Honolulu on 16 September and embarked on the USAT Buford for Monterey, California. On 26 September, the 17th Cavalry was inactivated and the officers and men were transferred to the 11th Cavalry. From 1921 to 1927, the 17th Cavalry's "Active Associate" unit that would provide the personnel to reactivate it in the event of war was the 11th Cavalry. With the abandonment of the Active Associate program in 1926–27, the 17th Cavalry was allotted to the Ninth Corps Area on 28 February 1927, and organized by June 1927 as a "Regular Army Inactive" unit with Organized Reserve personnel from the 2nd Squadron, 323rd Cavalry. The regimental headquarters was established at Portland, Oregon, with the 1st Squadron organized at Corvallis, Oregon, and the 2nd Squadron organized at Seattle, Washington. The regiment conducted summer training at Fort Lewis, Washington, 1930–40. It was reorganized and redesignated the 17th Cavalry Regiment (Horse and Mechanized) (Corps Reconnaissance) on 1 July 1940, and inactivated in January 1941 at Portland by relief of Reserve personnel.

=== Vietnam ===
Troop A, 17th Cavalry was reconstituted on 1 September 1957 in the Regular Army and consolidated with the 82d Airborne Reconnaissance Company and the consolidated unit designated as Troop A, 17th Cavalry, an element of the 82d Airborne Division at Fort Bragg, NC. It was reorganized and redesignated on 25 May 1964 as Headquarters and Headquarters Troop, 1st Squadron, 17th Cavalry (organic elements constituted 6 March 1964 and activated 25 May 1964). Troop B, 1st Squadron, 17th Cavalry was the ground reconnaissance element of the 3d Brigade, 82d Airborne Division in Vietnam. Troop A, 7th Squadron, 17th Air Cavalry Regiment arrived in Vietnam on 18 February 1968 and departed to Ft Bragg, NC, on 18 April 1972.

Troop B, 17th Cavalry was reconstituted on 25 April 1957 in the Regular Army and consolidated with the 101st Airborne Reconnaissance Troop and the consolidated unit designated as Troop B, 17th Cavalry, an element of the 101st Airborne Division. It was reorganized and redesignated on 3 February 1964 as Headquarters and Headquarters Troop, 2d Squadron, 17th Cavalry, and remained assigned to the 101st Airborne Division (organic elements concurrently constituted and activated as elements of the 101st Airborne Division) at Fort Campbell, KY. The 2d Squadron, 17th Cavalry was originally deployed to Vietnam on 12 December 1967 as the ground cavalry squadron of the 101st Airborne Division, but as the division changed to an airmobile mode the squadron was converted to an air cavalry status during the period December 1968 - June 1969. Troops A, B and C (airmobile aviation) thus joined the squadron in March 1969 to complete the conversion. The previous Troop A (ground reconnaissance) had been serving the 1st Brigade of the division since 29 July 1965. The entire squadron was involved in intense aerial combat during the Operation Lam Son 719 invasion of Laos, when the helicopters supported the Army of the Republic of Vietnam's drive and retreat directly. This action took place between February and April 1971. In 1970-71 the squadron raised provisional air cavalry Troops E and F. The squadron departed Vietnam on 8 February 1972.

In 1965 Troop A, 2d Squadron, 17th Cavalry, 1st Brigade, 101st Airborne Division was given a Valorous Unit Award for Operation Harrison Tuy Hoa Vietnam, Meritorious Unit Citation, and later after being employed for recon scout patrols in the Toumoroung battle to defend a Special Forces outpost and the Vietnamese company on the edge of complete destruction. Troop A deployed under the command of Captain Bill Carpenter, who called in napalm air strikes on his own position as it was being overrun. Departing from this battle, Troop A patrols were tasked to rescue and reinforce Lieutenant Colonel David Hackworth's Tiger Force (the battalion recon platoon of the 1st Battalion, 327th Infantry) of 45 soldiers who had been overrun and outnumbered 40 or more to 1. The 80 men of Troop A were at that time deployed in reconnaissance efforts along the Ho Chi Minh Trail and throughout the Dak To Province. Each of the 12 patrols rendezvoused with a chopper flight to fight their way in to rescue and re-enforce Tiger Force. The scout's radio frequency was changed to Tiger Force as it did every time the scouts were officially attached to another unit. Troop A was awarded the Presidential Unit Citation for heroism during this battle by President Lyndon B. Johnson. The unit was also awarded, as attached reinforcements under the command of Lieutenant Colonel David Hackworth, the South Vietnamese Presidential Citation. 8000 combat helicopter missions were flown during this three-week battle.

Troop C, 17th Cavalry was reconstituted 1 March 1957 in the Regular Army and consolidated with the 11th Airborne Reconnaissance Company and the consolidated unit designated as Troop C, 17th Cavalry, an element of the 11th Airborne Division (later designated as the 11th Air Assault Division). It was relieved 1 July 1958 from assignment to the 11th Airborne Division when the 11th was inactivated in southern Germany and its elements reflagged as the 24th Infantry Division and inactivated on 15 November 1958. Troop C was reactivated for a short period (16 March 1962 to 16 January 1963) at Fort Knox, KY, before the lineage was redesignated on 1 February 1963 as Headquarters and Headquarters Troop, 3d Squadron, 17th Cavalry, and remained assigned to the 11th Air Assault Division (Test)(organic elements concurrently constituted). Troop B, 3d Squadron, 17th Cavalry, was activated on 7 February 1963 at Fort Rucker, AL, while the rest of the squadron (less Troop B) was activated on 19 March 1964 at Fort Benning, GA. The squadron was relieved from assignment to the 11th Air Assault Division (Test) on 30 June 1965 and inactivated the next day. The assets of the 11th Air Assault Division and the 2d Infantry Division were merged and reflagged as the 1st Cavalry Division (Airmobile), and within several months the division was sent to Vietnam. The squadron was reactivated on 25 November 1966 at Fort Knox, KY, and was organized with Troops A, B, and C as air cavalry and Troop D as ground cavalry.

The 3d Squadron, 17th Cavalry arrived in Vietnam on 30 October 1967 and was assigned to the 12th Aviation Group, 1st Aviation Brigade, primarily stationed at Dĩ An. It was responsible for air cavalry support in the western part of III Corps Tactical Zone. On 20 July 1970 it was placed under the control of II Field Force, Vietnam. In January 1971 Troop C was transferred to the 7th Squadron, 1st Cavalry. Troops A, B and D departed Vietnam together in April 1972 and Troop C rejoined them for the redeployment. In late 1970 the squadron was placed under the operational control of the 1st Cavalry Division and, when combined with the division's 1st Squadron, 9th Cavalry, enabled the 1st Cavalry Division to form an ad hoc air cavalry brigade - a highly successful innovation. The squadron was inactivated on 19 June 1973 at Fort Lewis, WA.

Troop D, 17th Cavalry was initially in Vietnam as the ground reconnaissance element of the 199th Infantry Brigade (Light), arriving on 13 December 1966 and departing on 12 October 1970. The unit was raised as an air cavalry troop from the assets of Troop D, 3d Squadron, 5th Cavalry to support the 101st Airborne Division. This second tour lasted from 15 December 1971 to 20 March 1972. Finally, the unit was activated again on 30 April 1972 using the assets of Troop D, 1st Squadron, 1st Cavalry to serve the 11th Aviation Group at Da Nang. It departed Vietnam on 26 February 1973.

Troop E, 17th Cavalry was the ground reconnaissance element of the 173d Airborne Brigade, arriving in Vietnam from Okinawa on 6 May 1965. The troop was colocated with the brigade throughout its service in Vietnam and departed on 14 August 1971.

Troop F, 17th Cavalry was the ground reconnaissance element of the 196th Infantry Brigade (Light), arriving in Vietnam from Fort Devens, MA, on 26 August 1965. The troop was colocated with the brigade throughout its service in Vietnam and departed on 31 March 1972. Initially the unit was equipped with jeeps carrying mounted 106mm guns. Later Troop F was equipped with APCs, and in November 1969 it was outfitted, in addition to its APCs, with M551 Sheridans, M114 scout vehicles and APCs equipped with 106mm mounted guns (one per platoon), converting them into Armored Cavalry Assault Vehicles (ACAV).

The lineage of Troop G, 17th Cavalry, was perpetuated by HHT, 7th Squadron, 17th Cavalry which arrived in Vietnam from Fort Knox, KY, on 28 October 1967 and was attached to the 17th Aviation Group at Pleiku. It moved to Đắk Tô Base Camp in March 1968 and in May returned to Pleiku. In September 1969 the squadron was relocated to Kontum, moved to Dragon Mountain in November, and in January 1970 the unit returned to Pleiku. In March 1971 it went to Qui Nhon and in late 1971 it was posted to An Son. The following troops and companies served with the squadron in Vietnam:

- Troop A (Air Cav), October 1967 - July 1971, transferred to the 10th Aviation Battalion
- Troop B (Air Cav), October 1967 - July 1971, transferred to the 52d Aviation Battalion
- Troop C (Air Cav), July 1968 - April 1972, assets transferred to Troop H, 10th Cavalry
- Troop D (Ground), October 1967 - July 1971, transferred to the 52d Aviation Battalion
- 61st Aviation Company (Assault Helicopter), July 1971 - March 1972, departed Vietnam
- 129th Aviation Company (Assault Helicopter), July 1971 - April 1972, transferred to the 17th Aviation Group
- 180th Aviation Company (Assault Support Helicopter), March 1972 - April 1972, transferred to the 17th Aviation Group
- Troop H, 10th Cavalry (Air Cav), April 1972, transferred to the 17th Aviation Group
- Troop D, 1st Squadron, 10th Cavalry (Air Cav), July 1971 - February 1972, departed Vietnam

Troop A, 7th Squadron, 17th Air Cavalry, departed Vietnam on 18 April 1972 to Ft Bragg, NC.

Troop H, 17th Cavalry was initially the ground reconnaissance element of the 198th Infantry Brigade (Light), arriving in Da Nang aboard Military Sea Transports on 22 October 1967 from Fort Hood, TX, where it has been formed from units of the 1st and 2d Armored Divisions. Troop H departed Vietnam on 1 October 1971. It was re-raised in Vietnam from the assets of Troop B, 7th Squadron, 17th Cavalry and served a second tour in Vietnam from 30 April 1972 to 26 February 1973 under the 17th Aviation Group at Pleiku.

Troop K, 17th Cavalry arrived in Vietnam on 1 October 1970 as an air cavalry unit of the 17th Aviation Group in Nha Trang. It departed Vietnam in December 1970.

=== Post Vietnam ===
The 1st Squadron was assigned to the 82nd Airborne Division at Ft Bragg, NC, (1973). It was composed of four troops. Alpha Troop was an airborne ground unit, with recon jeeps. The jeeps were fitted with machine guns and TOWs. Bravo Troop was an air cavalry troop. It consisted of 9 AH-1D Cobra helicopters, 10 OH-58A scout helicopters and 8 UH-1H 'HUEYS". Five of the HUEYS were the lift section of the Aero Recon platoon, known as the 'Blues'. The remaining HUEYS were assigned to the commander, maintenance and supply. Bravo Troop also had a section of four UH-1M helicopters, with anti-tank capability. Charlie Troop and Delta Troop were similarly equipped, but did not have the 'Mike" models. The second squadron was assigned to the 101st Airborne, in Ft Campbell, KY.

On 2 June 1988 the squadron was assigned to the 10th Mountain Division (Light Infantry) and activated at Fort Drum, NY. On 16 November 1992 the lineage of the former 11th Airborne Reconnaissance Company was withdrawn from the 3d Squadron, 17th Cavalry and concurrently the lineage of the 10th Reconnaissance Company was consolidated with Headquarters and Headquarters Troop, 3d Squadron, 17th Cavalry. Troop E, 3d Squadron, 17th Cavalry, was constituted 16 December 1995 in the Regular Army and activated at Fort Wainwright, Alaska.

On 21 January 1988, the 4th squadron, 7th Cavalry Regiment was reflagged into the 5th Squadron, 17th Cavalry Regiment headquartered at Camp Garry Owen, South Korea south of the small Korean town of Yong Ju Gol. The 5th Squadron 17th Regiment Air Cavalry was one of the front line units stationed throughout the region in South Korea northwest of Seoul commonly referred to as the western corridor. The mission of the 5th squadron was to maintain readiness to deploy and conduct reconnaissance operations to enable the 3rd Brigade Combat Team, 2nd Infantry Division to conduct decisive full spectrum operations, and provide patrols and support for operations maintaining security of the DMZ (Demilitarized Zone) between North and South Korea. The 5th Squadron Headquarters (HHT) and two Armor Cavalry Alpha (A) and Bravo (B) Troops were stationed at Camp Garry Owen in 1988. The Air Cavalry Troops Charlie, Delta, Echo and Foxtrot (C-F) were stationed separately at Camp Stanley when the 5th Squadron was initiated until later that year when the Air Cavalry relocated to Camp Mobile. In 1992 the Armor Cavalry moved to Camp Pelham, later renamed Camp Garry Owen and the Air Cavalry was moved to Camp Stanton. On 5 April 1996 the 5th Squadron 17th Cavalry Regiment was reflagged as the 4th Squadron 7th Cavalry Regiment leaving the 5th Squadron inactive to present. The Squadron was reactivated on 2 June 1988, as the Cavalry Squadron of the 10th Mountain Division (Light Infantry) at Griffis AFB. Following a move to Fort Drum's Wheeler Sack Army Airfield, the Squadron deployed to Florida as part of the relief efforts following Hurricane Andrew in 1992. A few months later, the Squadron deployed to Eastern Africa as part of Operation "Restore Hope", conducting reconnaissance and security operations to assist in restoring order to famine stricken Somalia. Alpha Troop, 3-17 Cavalry deployed in support of Operation "Uphold Democracy" in Haiti. 3rd Squadron 17th Cavalry also served as an element of the 10th Mt. Division in Kosovo in 2001 and 2002 as a part of Operation Joint Guardian, where they performed multiple peacekeeping roles.

=== Iraq ===
The ground cavalry troop, A Troop ("Shadow"), 1-17 Cavalry, deployed to Iraq as part of TF 1-82 Aviation for the initial invasion of Iraq during Operation Iraqi Freedom (OIF) in 2003. The 1st Squadron deployed again to Iraq in 2003-2004 during OIF II. CPT Kimberly Hampton, commanding Darkhorse Troop, was killed in action on 2 January 2004. The 3-17 Cavalry deployed twice in support of OIF. In 2003, the Squadron deployed with the 3rd Stryker Brigade Combat Team, 2nd Infantry Division. 3-17 Cavalry earned a Meritorious Unit Commendation for operations in Samarra, Mosul, and Tal Afar. In 2005, 2d Squadron deployed with the 101st Combat Aviation Brigade to conduct operations in Multinational Division-North out of FOB Speicher during OIF 05-07. In 2007, 3d Squadron deployed as part of the Presidential Surge, under the operational control of the 3rd Combat Aviation Brigade in securing the “Southern Belts” of Baghdad. On 22 October 2008, the Squadron was released from the 10th Mountain Division (Light Infantry) and permanently assigned to the 3rd Combat Aviation Brigade, 3rd Infantry Division and moved from Fort Drum, New York to Hunter Army Airfield, Georgia.

In 2017, 2d Squadron deployed to Camp Taji in support of Operation Inherent Resolve, to be replaced in early 2018 by 7th Squadron, under the operational control of the 449th Combat Aviation Brigade, North Carolina Army National Guard.

=== Afghanistan ===
A reinforced 1st Platoon, from Troop A ("Shadow"), 1-17 Cavalry deployed with the 82d Aviation Brigade for Operation Enduring Freedom (OEF) II in 2002-2003. Apache Troop 3rd Squadron 17th Cavalry deployed in support operations with the 1st BCT 10th Mountain division during OEF IV from Aug 2003 - April 2004. The Troop performed security operations for the 10th Aviation Brigade Headquarters. In late 2007, TF 2-17 CAV deployed to Jalalabad Airfield as the aviation task force covering Nangarhar, Nuristan, Kunar, and Laghman provinces during OEF 07-09 as part of the 101st Combat Aviation Brigade, replaced by TF 7-17 CAV a year later from the 159th Combat Aviation Brigade. In 2012, the 2nd Squadron was deployed back to its previous base in Jalalabad, replacing the 1st Squadron that had deployed in 2011.

== Units ==
=== Active units ===
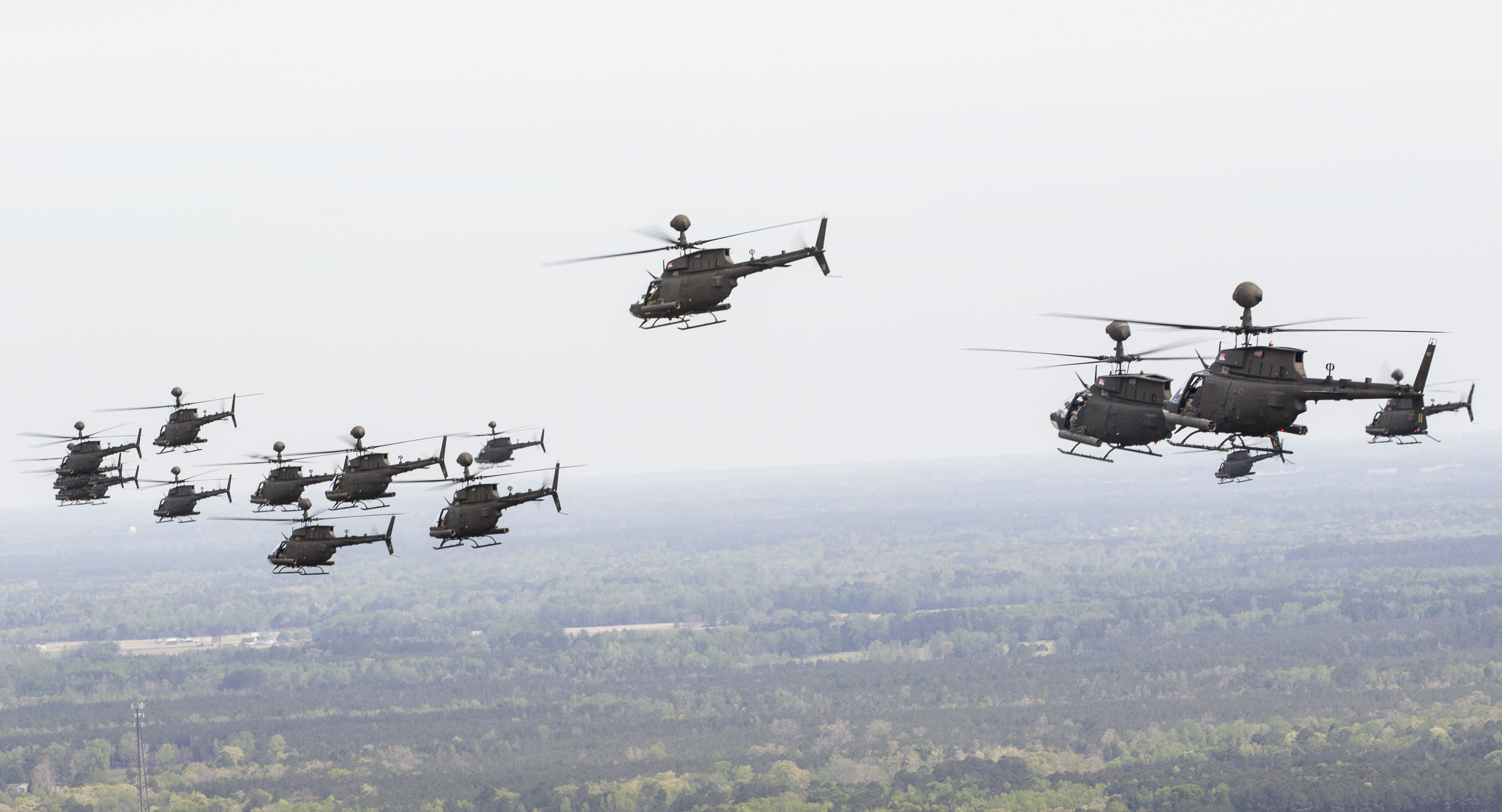
OH-58D Kiowa Warriors with the 1st Squadron, 17th Cavalry Regiment, 82nd Combat Aviation Brigade, conduct a flyover over the City of Fayetteville, N.C., April 15. 2016.

- 1st Squadron was the attack-reconnaissance squadron of the Combat Aviation Brigade, 82nd Airborne Division. The squadron was deactivated on 15 December 2025.
- 2nd Squadron is the attack-reconnaissance squadron of the Combat Aviation Brigade, 101st Airborne Division stationed at Fort Campbell, Kentucky
- 3rd Squadron was the attack-reconnaissance squadron of the Combat Aviation Brigade, 3rd Infantry Division. In October 2025 the unit was reflagged as 1st Battalion (Attack), 3rd Aviation Regiment.
- 5th Squadron was the attack-reconnaissance squadron of the Combat Aviation Brigade, 2nd Infantry Division. The squadron was deactivated on 12 December 2025.
- 6th Squadron was the attack-reconnaissance squadron of the Combat Aviation Brigade, 4th Infantry Division, stationed at Fort Carson, Colorado
- 7th Squadron was the attack-reconnaissance squadron of the Combat Aviation Brigade, 1st Cavalry Division. The squadron was deactivated on 16 December 2025.

=== Unit history ===
1st Squadron 17th Cavalry

After Vietnam, the squadron was equipped with ground recon jeeps, 27 Cobras, 30 OH-58A helicopters, and three aero rifle platoons. They had a LNO assigned to the Division Aviation Office, which was otherwise manned by officers from the Aviation Battalion.

- Call Sign: Saber

1-17 CAV was one of two OH-58D units in the Combat Aviation Brigade, 82nd Airborne Division. Upon return from OIF in 2006 the unit moved to Ft. Campbell, KY, and reflagged as 7-17 CAV. The other OH-58D unit in the Combat Aviation Brigade, 82nd Airborne Division reflagged from 1st Battalion, 82nd Aviation Regiment to 1-17 CAV (call sign: Horsemen) under the command of LTC Michael Pyott, prior to deployment to Iraq in 2006. LTC Mike Morgan returned the call sign to the original "Saber" in 2008.
2nd Squadron 17th Cavalry

- Call Sign: Out Front

3rd Squadron 17th Cavalry

- Call Sign: Light Horse

3rd Squadron traces its lineage to Troop C of the original regiment.
3rd Squadron had been stationed under the Combat Aviation Brigade, 10th Mountain Division (Light Infantry) at Fort Drum, New York ever since it was reconstituted in 1986. During the squadron's tenure at Fort Drum, its members cultivated a friendship with the Royal Canadian Dragoons. After returning from multiple deployments from Afghanistan and Iraq, the 3rd Squadron cased their colors and remaining troops were scattered around Ft. Drum and formed into 1-71, 2-71, and 3-71 RSTA Squadrons. Currently assigned to the Combat Aviation Brigade, 3rd Infantry Division. While the division is based at Fort Stewart, GA, the CAB is located at Hunter Army Airfield on the south side of Savannah, GA.
4th Squadron 17th Cavalry
Inactive. Originally created from Aviation Task Force 118 which replaced elements of the 160th Aviation Group (Airborne) in the Persian Gulf during Operation Prime Chance. Reflagged as 4th Squadron, 2nd Armored Cavalry Regiment and relocated to Fort Polk, Louisiana. 4th Squadron, 2nd Armored Cavalry Regiment reflagged as the 4th Squadron, 6th Cavalry Regiment when the 2nd Armored Cavalry Regiment was restructured and re-designated as the 2nd Cavalry Regiment.
5th Squadron 17th Cavalry

The 5th Squadron is assigned to the 2nd Combat Aviation Brigade, 2nd Infantry Division.

5th Squadron, 17th Regiment was last active in the Republic of Korea reflagged from the 4th Squadron, 7th Cavalry on 21 Jan 1988.

- Call Sign: Out Front.

The HHT, A-B Troops (Scout Armor Ground Cavalry) were located at Camp Garry Owen and Camp Pelham and C-F Troops (Air Cavalry) originally at Camp Stanley later moved to Camp Mobile; G Troop was the 2ID Long-range surveillance detachment. On 5 April 1996 the unit reflagged back to 4th Squadron, 7th Cavalry. On May 17, 2022, 5th Squadron was reactivated at Camp Humphreys, Korea as an Air Cavalry Squadron.

6th Squadron 17th Cavalry

- Call Sign: Out Front

6th Squadron, 17th Cavalry Regiment reflagged from Ft. Wainwright, Alaska and currently is an air cavalry unit located at Ft. Carson, Colorado as of 16 October 2015.
7th Squadron 17th Cavalry

- Call Sign: Pale Horse

Reflagged from 1-17 (Pale Horse) in 2006 after returning from OIF. Relocated to Fort Campbell, Kentucky as 7-17.

In 2010 Pale Horse became the first unit in history to win both the AAAA Aviation Unit of the Year and the Ellis D. Parker Aviation Unit of the Year.

Relocated from Fort Campbell, Kentucky to Fort Hood, Texas in 2015, as a part of the Combat Aviation Brigade, 1st Cavalry Division.

== Honors ==
=== Campaign participation credit ===
- 17th Cavalry Regiment
  - World War II: Northern France; Rhineland; Ardennes-Alsace; Central Europe
  - Vietnam: Defense; Counteroffensive; Counteroffensive, Phase II; Counteroffensive, Phase III; Tet Counteroffensive; Counteroffensive, Phase IV; Counteroffensive, Phase V; Counteroffensive, Phase VI; Tet 69/Counteroffensive; Summer-Fall 1969; Winter-Spring 1970; Sanctuary Counteroffensive; Counteroffensive, Phase VII; Consolidation I; Consolidation II; Cease-Fire
  - Armed Forces Expeditions: Dominican Republic; Grenada
  - Southwest Asia: Defense of Saudi Arabia; Liberation and Defense of Kuwait
- 1st Squadron
  - World War I: St. Mihiel; Meuse-Argonne; Lorraine
  - World War II: Northern France; * Rhineland; Ardennes-Alsace; * Central Europe
  - Armed Forces Expeditions: Dominican Republic; Grenada
  - Southwest Asia: Defense of Saudi Arabia; Liberation and Defense of Kuwait
  - Troop B additionally entitled to:
    - Vietnam: Tet Counteroffensive; Counteroffensive, Phase IV; Counteroffensive, Phase V; Counteroffensive, Phase VI; Tet 69/Counteroffensive; Summer-Fall 1969; Winter-Spring 1970
  - Troop D additionally entitled to:
    - Armed Forces Expeditions: Panama
- 2nd Squadron
  - World War II: Northern France; Rhineland; Ardennes-Alsace; Central Europe
  - Vietnam: Counteroffensive; Tet Counteroffensive; Counteroffensive, Phase IV; Counteroffensive, Phase V; Counteroffensive, Phase VI; Tet 69/Counteroffensive; Summer-Fall 1969; Winter-Spring 1970; Sanctuary Counteroffensive; Counteroffensive, Phase VII; Consolidation I; Consolidation II
  - Southwest Asia: Defense of Saudi Arabia; Liberation and Defense of Kuwait
  - Troop A additionally entitled to:
    - Vietnam: Defense; Counteroffensive; Counteroffensive, Phase II
- 3rd Squadron
  - World War II: Northern France; Rhineland; North Apennines; Ardennes-Alsace; Central Europe; Po Valley
  - Vietnam: Counteroffensive, Phase III; Tet Counteroffensive; Counteroffensive, Phase IV; Counteroffensive, Phase V; Counteroffensive, Phase VI; Tet 69/Counteroffensive; Summer-Fall 1969; Winter-Spring 1970; Sanctuary Counteroffensive; Counteroffensive, Phase VII; Consolidation I; Consolidation II; Cease-Fire

=== Decorations ===
- 17th Cavalry Regiment
  - Presidential Unit Citation (Army) for DAK TO
  - Valorous Unit Award for BEN CAT
  - Valorous Unit Award for SAIGON-LONG BINH
  - Valorous Unit Award for THUA THIEN - QUANG TRI
  - Valorous Unit Award for CAMBODIA
  - Meritorious Unit Commendation (Army) for VIETNAM 1966 -1967
  - Meritorious Unit Commendation (Army) for SOUTHWEST ASIA
- 1st Squadron
  - Meritorious Unit Commendation (Army) for SOUTHWEST ASIA
  - Troop B additionally entitled to:
    - Republic of Vietnam Cross of Gallantry with Palm for VIETNAM 1968–1969
    - Republic of Vietnam Civil Action Honor Medal, First Class for VIETNAM 1968
- 2nd Squadron
  - Valorous Unit Award for THUA THIEN-QUANG TRI
  - Meritorious Unit Commendation (Army) for SOUTHWEST ASIA
  - Republic of Vietnam Cross of Gallantry with Palm for VIETNAM 1968
  - Republic of Vietnam Cross of Gallantry with Palm for VIETNAM 1968–1969
  - Republic of Vietnam Cross of Gallantry with Palm for VIETNAM 1969–1971
  - Republic of Vietnam Cross of Gallantry with Palm for VIETNAM 1971
  - Republic of Vietnam Civil Action Honor Medal, First Class for VIETNAM 1968–1970
  - Troop A additionally entitled to:
    - Presidential Unit Citation (Army) for DAK TO
    - Presidential Unit Citation (Army) for DONG AP BIA MOUNTAIN
    - Valorous Unit Award for TUY HOA
    - Valorous Unit Award for THUA THIEN PROVINCE
    - Meritorious Unit Commendation (Army) for VIETNAM 1965–1966
    - Republic of Vietnam Cross of Gallantry with Palm for VIETNAM 1966–1967
- 3rd Squadron
  - Valorous Unit Award for CAMBODIA
  - Republic of Vietnam Cross of Gallantry with Palm for VIETNAM 1967–1968
  - Republic of Vietnam Cross of Gallantry with Palm for VIETNAM 1971
  - Republic of Vietnam Civil Action Honor Medal, First Class for VIETNAM 1969–1970
  - Headquarters Troops additionally entitled to:
    - Republic of Vietnam Cross of Gallantry with Palm for VIETNAM 1969–1970
    - Republic of Vietnam Cross of Gallantry with Palm for VIETNAM 1971–1972
  - Troop A additionally entitled to:
    - Valorous Unit Award for SAIGON-LONG BINH
    - Republic of Vietnam Cross of Gallantry with Palm for VIETNAM 1968
    - Republic of Vietnam Cross of Gallantry with Palm for VIETNAM 1970
    - Republic of Vietnam Cross of Gallantry with Palm for VIETNAM 1970–1971
    - Republic of Vietnam Civil Action Honor Medal, First Class for VIETNAM 1968
  - Troop B additionally entitled to:
    - Valorous Unit Award for TAY NINH PROVINCE
    - Republic of Vietnam Cross of Gallantry with Palm for VIETNAM 1969
    - Republic of Vietnam Cross of Gallantry with Palm for VIETNAM 1970–1971
    - Republic of Vietnam Cross of Gallantry with Palm for VIETNAM 1971
    - Republic of Vietnam Civil Action Honor Medal, First Class for VIETNAM 1969

== Heraldry ==
Distinctive unit insignia

- Description: A silver color metal and enamel device 1 1/8 inches (2.9 cm) in height overall consisting of a hurt wavy of six voided similarly or superimposed by a silver winged spur.
- Symbolism: The winged spur is emblematic of cavalry and speed. The blue ribbon alludes to service with the American Expeditionary Forces.
- Background: The distinctive unit insignia was approved on 28 June 1923. It was amended to revise the description and symbolism on 15 September 1987.

Coat of arms

- Blazon:
- Shield: Per bend Tenné and Vert, in sinister chief a demi-unicorn and in dexter base a demi-horse both rampant Argent.
- Crest: On a wreath of the colors Argent and Tenné superimposed on a hurt wavy of six voided similarly Or a winged spur Argent.
- Motto: FORWARD.
- Symbolism:
  - Shield: The shield is taken from the coat of arms of the parent organizations: The First, Third, Sixth, Eighth and Fourteenth Cavalry Regiments. The orange is representative of the uniform facings of the First Cavalry (the old First Dragoons), and the green alludes to the uniform facings of the Third Cavalry (the old Mounted Rifles). The demi-unicorn is taken from the shield of the Sixth Cavalry and the demi-horse from the Eighth Cavalry. The diagonal line is symbolic of the Fourteenth Cavalry.
  - Crest: The winged spur is emblematic of cavalry and speed. The blue ribbon alludes to service with the American Expeditionary Forces.
- Background: The coat of arms was approved on 19 June 1923. It was amended to change the symbolism on 23 June 1960. The coat of arms was amended to revise the symbolism on 15 September 1987.

== Traditions ==
Major General Holbrook, while he had commanded the regiment, had presented a cup to be awarded during a regimental competition among the officers of the 17th Cavalry. The competition became an annual event and continued to be held in Hawaii. The test consisted of a ten-mile cross-country ride containing two series of four jumps each, followed by two series of five jumps each and a fifteen-foot water jump. The winning riders' names were engraved on the cup, which was maintained by the regiment. Unfortunately, it cannot be found today.

== See also ==
Regimental Medal of Honor recipients

- Michael John Fitzmaurice
- Garfield M. Langhorn
- Joseph G. LaPointe Jr.
- Ray McKibben
- Robert Martin Patterson
